= Marine Air Control Squadron 6 =

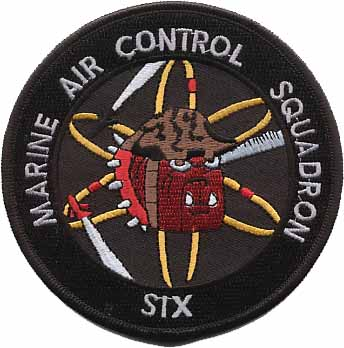
- MACS-6 Insignia
- Active: 10 Aug 1944 – 9 Dec 1998
- Country: United States of America
- Branch: United States Marine Corps
- Type: Aviation Command & Control
- Role: Aerial surveillance & Air traffic control
- Nicknames: Watchdogs; Bonnie Sue (callsign)

Marine Air Control Squadron 6 (MACS-6) was a United States Marine Corps aviation command and control squadron. The squadron provided aerial surveillance and early warning while operational from 1944 through 1998. They were last based at Marine Corps Air Station Cherry Point, North Carolina and fell under the command of Marine Air Control Group 28 (MACG-28) and the 2nd Marine Aircraft Wing (2nd MAW).

== History ==
Air Warning Squadron 17 was commissioned August 10, 1944 at MCAS Cherry Point, North Carolina. On September 11, 1944 a majority of the squadron moved to Marine Corps Outlying Field Oak Grove, North Carolina to begin training on air defense equipment while a smaller detachment was sent to Marine Corps Auxiliary Landing Field Bogue. The squadron was still located in North Carolina when the Second World War ended.

On August 1,1946 the squadron was re-designated as Marine Ground Control Intercept Squadron 6 (MGCIS-6). Throughout the postwar period and the Korean War the squadron remained at MCAS Cherry Point, except for recurrent exercises along the east coast of the United States. On February 15, 1954 the unit received its final designation as Marine Air Control Squadron 6 (MACS-6). Its mission was defined as follows: “To install, maintain, and operate ground facilities for the detection and interception of hostile aircraft and missiles and for the navigational direction of friendly aircraft in the accomplishment of support missions.”

After its re-designation, MACS-6 was frequently deployed to the Caribbean Ocean area, including Puerto Rico and the Panama Canal Zone, to participate in fleet and division/wing exercises. In June 1958, the squadron was alerted for a possible deployment to Lebanon. The easing of tensions there would nullify the requirement for the squadron’s deployment.

For the next four years the squadron was once again engaged in numerous combat exercises, primarily at Marine Corps Auxiliary Landing Field Bogue and Marine Corps Base Camp Lejeune in North Carolina. In the spring of 1962 the squadron was transferred to Marine Corps Air Station El Toro, California to await further orders for an overseas assignment. After a brief respite there the squadron received it orders to proceed to the Far East. On April 16, 1962, it sailed from the Port of Long Beach, California for Japan via Pearl Harbor and Okinawa. Two and a half weeks later they arrived at Naval Air Station Atsugi, Japan.

Following the end of its tour in Japan the squadron returned to the east coast of the United States in May 1963 however at a new location – Marine Corps Air Station Beaufort, South Carolina. They remained there until they received orders to proceed to Camp Schwab on Okinawa, Japan where they were fully established by 1 October 1965. The squadron remained there until the end of February 1968 when it returned to the United States arriving at MCAS Cherry Point, North Carolina on March 30, 1968.

The squadron deployed to various nations in and around Europe and the Mediterranean Sea supporting numerous North Atlantic Treaty Organization (NATO) exercises during the 1970s and 1980s.

Elements of the squadron participated in Operations Desert Shield and Desert Storm from August 1990 through April 1991.

== Unit awards ==
A unit citation or commendation is an award bestowed upon an organization for the action cited. Members of the unit who participated in said actions are allowed to wear on their uniforms the awarded unit citation. MACS-6 has been presented with the following awards:

Streamer	Award	Year(s)	Additional Info
	Meritorious Unit Commendation Streamer	1980-1981, 1985-1986	
	American Defense Service Streamer with one Bronze Star		World War II
	World War II Victory Streamer	1941–1945	Pacific War
	National Defense Service Streamer with two Bronze Stars	1950–1954, 1961–1974, 1990–1995	Korean War, Vietnam War, Gulf War

== See also ==
- United States Marine Corps Aviation
- Aviation combat element
- List of United States Marine Corps aviation support squadrons
