= 5th Light Antiaircraft Missile Battalion =

US Marine Corps unit

- Active: 1 Jul 1966 – 30 Jan 1969
- Country: United States of America
- Branch: United States Marine Corps
- Type: Air Defense
- Part of: Inactive
- Mascot(s): "Silver" – a red tailed hawk

Commanders
- Current commander: N/A

5th Light Antiaircraft Missile Battalion (5th LAAM Bn) was a United States Marine Corps air defense unit equipped with the medium range surface-to-air MIM-23 HAWK Missile System. 5th LAAM was commissioned at Marine Corps Air Station Yuma, Arizona during the Vietnam War to augment training on the West Coast after 2d LAAM Battalion deployed to Vietnam. The battalion was under the command of Marine Air Control Group 38 & the 3rd Marine Aircraft Wing. 5th LAAM Battalion was deactivated on 30 January 1969 after 2d LAAM Battalion returned from its time in Vietnam.

== Organization ==
- Headquarters and Services Battery
- Alpha Battery
- Bravo Battery

== History ==
5th LAAM Battalion was commissioned on 1 July 1966 at MCAS Yuma by authority of CMC Message 181748Z June 66. Initially formed with a cadre of only 13 personnel, the battalion spent its first few months administratively organizing and getting personnel numbers up to full strength. The battalion’s tactical equipment began to arrive in November 1966 and was mostly complete by February 1967.

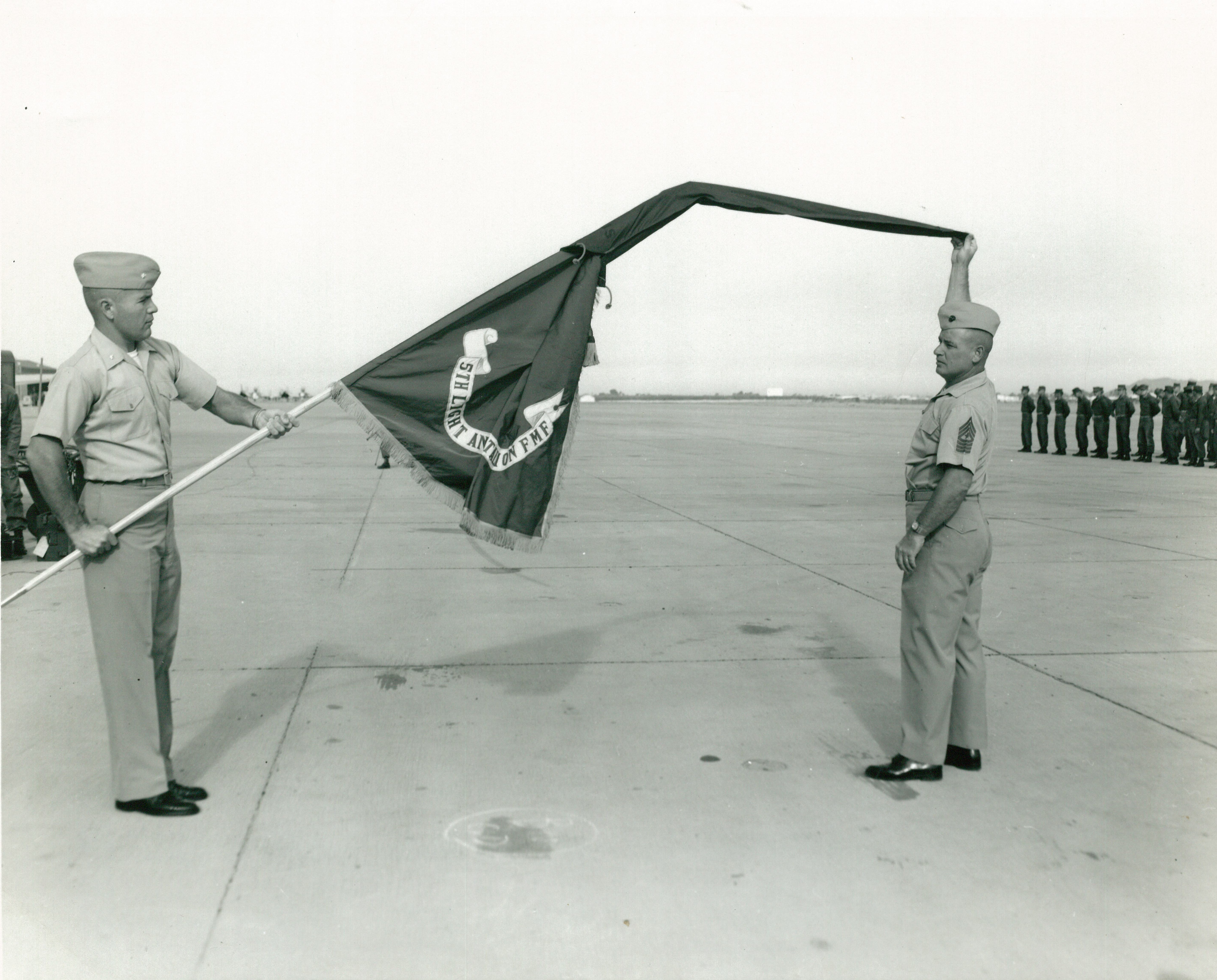
LtCol Malcolm Jolley, 5th LAAM Battalion Commanding Officer, holds the newly arrived battalion colors as the Sergeant Major unfurls them for the first time on 14 April 1967.

As 1967 began, the battalion began its first 90-day training period which culminated in their first HAWK Missile FIREX which was conducted 16–21 April 1967. Another 90-day training period in that summer culminated in another FIREX in September. This FIREX was notable because 5th LAAM was the only US based HAWK missile unit to train with F-4 Phantoms utilizing TDU-22B targets. As 1967 drew to a close, 5th LAAM participated in Exercise Blue Lotus from 28 November - 3 December. For this large-scale, amphibious exercise, the battalion played the role of an adversary unit and they also executed an airlift of the entire battalion. Five C-141 Starlifters from the 63d Military Airlift Wing flew all personnel and gear from MCAS Yuma to Naval Air Facility El Centro, California.

During the first half of 1968 the battalion conducted two HAWK FIREXs, served as an adversary unit for three First Fleet exercises and also had a battery take part in an Anti-Air Warfare Exercise. In December 1968, 5th LAAM worked hand-in-hand with Marine Air Control Squadron 1 and became the first Marine Corps HAWK unit to fire a missile via Automatic Datalink commands from the Marine Tactical Data System at the Tactical Air Operations Center.

On 28 December 1968, the battalion was informed by Headquarters Marine Corps that it would be decommissioned. The impetus for the battalion’s decommissioning was 2d LAAM Battalions return from Vietnam. 5th LAAM Battalion was decommissioned on 30 January 1969. Personnel from 5th LAAM were originally transferred to Sub Unit #1, H&S Battery, 2d LAAM Battalion and the units equipment was transferred to C & D Batteries, 2d LAAM Battalion.

== Commanding Officers ==
- Maj George B. Townsend (1 July 1966 – 30 August 1966)
- LtCol Malcolm S. Jolley (1 September 1966 – 8 November 1968)
- Maj Alan C. Getz (9 November 1968 – 30 January 1969)

== Unit awards ==
A unit citation or commendation is an award bestowed upon an organization for the action cited. Members of the unit who participated in said actions are allowed to wear on their uniforms the awarded unit citation. The 5th Light Antiaircraft Missile Battalion has been presented with the following awards:

Streamer	Award	Year(s)	Additional Info
	National Defense Service Streamer with one Bronze Star	1966-69	Vietnam War

== See also ==
- United States Marine Corps Aviation
- List of United States Marine Corps aviation support units
- History of ground based air defense in the United States Marine Corps
