= Air Warning Squadron 14 =

United States Marine Corps aviation command and control squadron

- Active: 1 June 1944 – 30 November 1945
- Country: United States
- Allegiance: United States of America
- Branch: United States Marine Corps
- Type: Aviation Command & Control
- Role: Aerial surveillance & early warning
- Size: Approx 300

Commanders
- Current commander: N/A

Air Warning Squadron 14 (AWS-14) was a United States Marine Corps aviation command and control squadron during World War II. The squadron's primary mission was to provide aerial surveillance and early warning of approaching enemy aircraft during amphibious assaults. Formed in June 1944, the squadron was one of a handful of air warning squadrons that was never able to deploy overseas during the war. The squadron was decommissioned shortly after the end of the war in November 1945. To date, no other Marine Corps squadron has carried the lineage and honors of AWS-14 to include the former reserve Marine Air Control Squadron 14 (MACS-14).

== Equipment ==
- AN/TTQ-1 – transportable filter and operations center.
- 2 x SCR-270s – long range early warning radar.
- 1 x SCR-527 – medium-range early warning radar used for ground-controlled interception (GCI).
- 3 x SCR-602s – Light-weight early warning radar to be utilized during the initial stages of an amphibious assault.

== Mission ==
Provides an early warning of air raids and tactical control of aircraft in defense of the assigned area.

== History ==
=== Organization and training ===
Air Warning Squadron 14 was commissioned on 1 June 1944 as part of Marine Air Warning Group 1 at Marine Corps Air Station Cherry Point, North Carolina. On 15 July 1944 the majority of the squadron convoyed to Marine Corps Outlying Field Oak Grove in Pollocksville, North Carolina while an SCR-270 crew was sent to Bogue Field. Air Warning Group 1 maintained its training equipment at the Pollocksville site and each new air warning squadron commissioned rotated through for its first familiarization on the gear. The squadron returned to MCAS Cherry Point on 10 September 1944 and continued training at the station until November.

=== Congaree and decommissioning ===
In November 1944 the squadron was transferred to Congaree Army Airfield, South Carolina when the base was made available to Navy and Marine Corps units. Training was immediately commenced in radar and control center operations and they worked closely with aircraft from Marine Aircraft Group 52 and army aircraft from nearby Chatham Field. During this period the squadron's Air Defense Control Center went by the callsign "Wilson."

On 8 October 1945 the squadron ceased operations at Congaree and began preparing their gear for departure. On 26 October it moved back to MCAS Cherry Point. The squadron was decommissioned on 30 November 1945 by the authority of 9th Marine Aircraft Wing order #57-145.

== Commanding officers ==
- Capt Edward R. Stainback – 1 June 1944 – 27 November 1944
- Capt Robert M. McCormick Jr. – 28 November 1944 – 1 March 1945
- Capt William E. Hooper 2 March 1945 – 30 March 1945
- Capt Robert M. McCormick Jr - 31 March 1945 – 4 October 1945
- 1stLt J.J. Hengstler - 5 October 1945 – 30 November 1945

== Unit awards ==
A unit citation or commendation is an award bestowed upon an organization for the action cited. Members of the unit who participated in said actions are allowed to wear on their uniforms the awarded unit citation. What follows is an incomplete list of the awards AWS-14 has been presented with:

Streamer	Award	Year(s)	Additional Info
	World War II Victory Streamer	1943–1945	World War II

== See also ==
- Aviation combat element
- United States Marine Corps Aviation
- List of United States Marine Corps aviation support units
