= Air Warning Squadron 4 =

- Active: 1 Nov 1943 – 31 Oct 1945
- Country: United States
- Allegiance: United States of America
- Branch: United States Marine Corps
- Type: Aviation Command & Control
- Role: Aerial surveillance & early warning
- Size: 267
- Engagements: World War II: Philippines campaign (1944–1945)

Commanders
- Current commander: N/A

Air Warning Squadron 4 (AWS-4) was a United States Marine Corps aviation command and control squadron during World War II. The squadron's primary mission was to provide aerial surveillance and early warning of approaching enemy aircraft during amphibious assaults. The squadron participated in the Philippines campaign (1944–1945) in support of the Eighth Army on Mindanao. AWS-4 was decommissioned shortly after the war in October 1945. To date, no other Marine Corps squadron has carried the lineage and honors of AWS-4 to include Marine Air Control Squadron 4 (MACS-4).

== Equipment ==
- AN/TTQ-1 - transportable filter and operations center.
- SCR-270 - long range early warning radar.
- SCR-527 - medium-range early warning radar used for ground-controlled interception (GCI).
- SCR-602 - Light-weight early warning radar to be utilized during the initial stages of an amphibious assault.

== History ==
=== Organization and training ===
Air Warning Squadron 4 was commissioned on 1 November 1943, as part of Marine Air Warning Group 1 at Marine Corps Air Station Cherry Point, North Carolina.

On 16 December 1943, AWS-4 received orders to prepare to ship out to the West Coast beginning the first week of January 1944. Arriving at Marine Corps Air Station Miramar, California on 5 January 1944, the squadron began additional training as part of Marine Air Warning Group 2.

=== Hawaii ===
The squadron embarked upon the USS Hornet (CV-12) on 29 February and departed San Diego. Arriving at Pearl Harbor, Territory of Hawaii on 4 March it established itself at Marine Corps Air Station Ewa. The squadron's gear did not arrive until April at which point it began rigorous training in day/night fighter direction and ground controlled interception as it awaited orders to deploy. AWS-4 was the first Marine Corps squadron to receive and operate the newly fielded AN/TTQ-1 Operations Center

=== Los Negros and the Philippines ===
In November 1944, AWS-4 arrived at Los Negros in the Admiralty Islands where it established its equipment and continued training. In February 1945 planning took place for the final portion of the Philippines Campaign. The Marine Corps was tasked to provide four Marine Aircraft Groups and two air warning squadrons in support of the Eighth United States Army. AWS-3 and AWS-4 were the two squadrons tapped to fulfill this mission. It was not until April 1945 that AWS-4 departed Los Negros bound for the Southern Philippines. The squadron landed on Mindanao and quickly established itself at Moret Field operating as the 76th Fighter Control Center. AWS-4 was tasked with providing direction finding for lost aircraft, early warning, additional air to ground communications links and additional fighter direction nets.

=== Return home and decommissioning ===
AWS-4 departed the Philippines in early August 1945 bound for Hawaii. Arriving at Marine Corps Air Station Ewa on 19 August, the squadron began turning in all of its equipment. Remaining personnel embarked on the USS Ticonderoga (CV-14) on 30 September for transportation back to the United States. The squadron arrived at Naval Air Station Alameda on 5 October with follow on transportation to Marine Corps Air Station Miramar. The squadron was decommissioned on 31 October 1945, on the authority of Chief of Naval Operations Dispatch 242216, October 1945 and Marine Fleet Air, West Coast General Order #144-45.

== Commanding officers ==
- 1stLt John D. Taylor - 1 November 1943 – 11 November 1943
- Capt John M. Von Almen - 12 November 1943 – 14 November 1944
- Capt Charles T. Porter 15 November 1944 – 14 August 1945
- Capt John C. Adams - 15 August 1945 – 20 August 1945
- Maj Freeman R. Cass. - 21 August 1945 – 26 October 1945
- WO R.E. Lesher - 27 October 1945 – 31 October 1945

== Unit awards ==
A unit citation or commendation is an award bestowed upon an organization for the action cited. Members of the unit who participated in said actions are allowed to wear on their uniforms the awarded unit citation. What follows is an incomplete list of the awards AWS-4 has been presented with:

Streamer	Award	Year(s)	Additional Info
	Navy Unit Commendation Streamer	1945	Mindanao
	Asiatic–Pacific Campaign Streamer with one Bronze Star	1945	Philippines campaign (1944–1945)
	World War II Victory Streamer	1943–1945	Pacific War

== See also ==
- Aviation combat element
- United States Marine Corps Aviation
- List of United States Marine Corps aviation support units
