= Marine Air Base Squadron 13 =

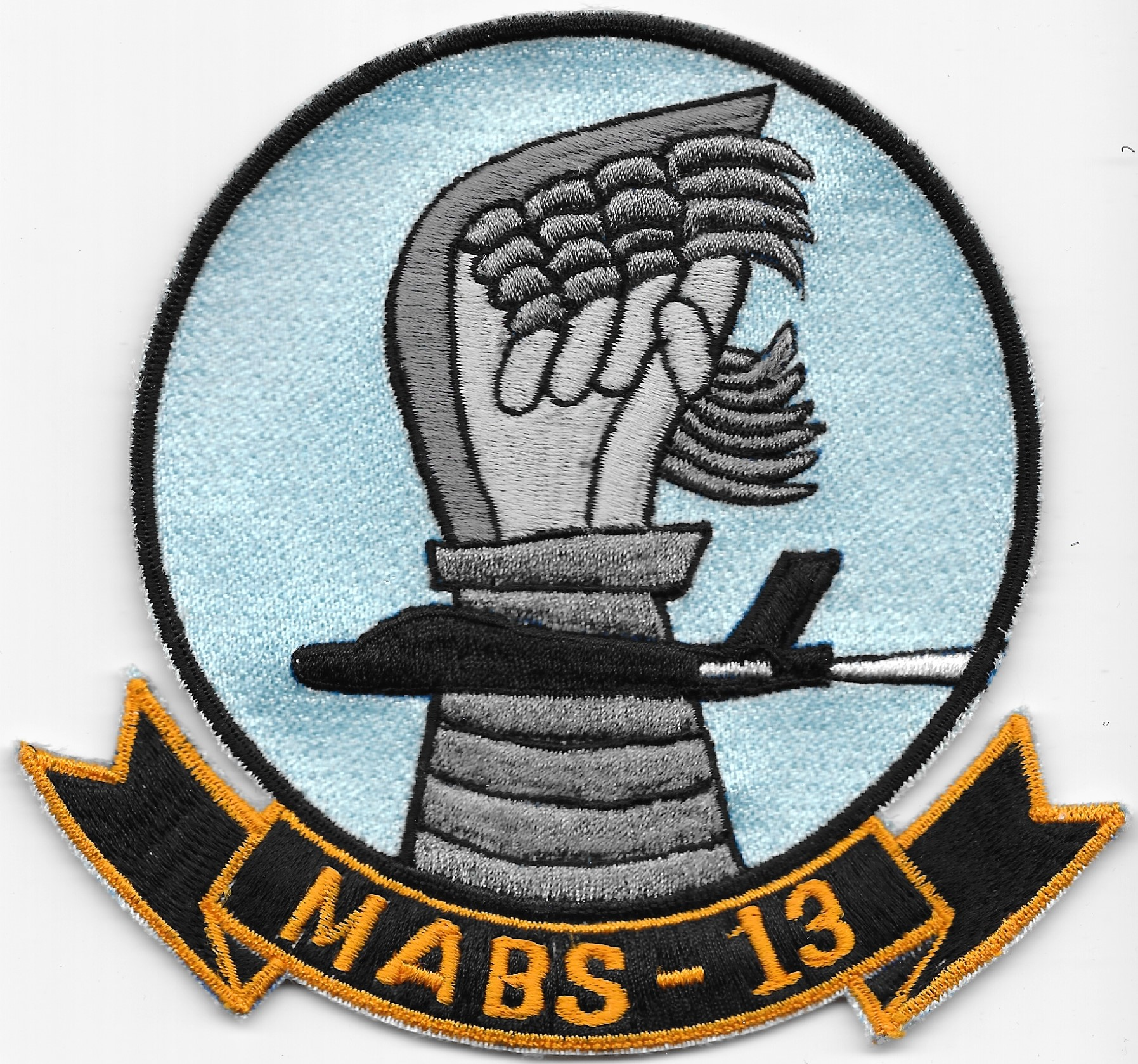
- MABS-13 insignia from the 1960s
- Active: 1 Aug 1942 – 30 Nov 1945; 1 Mar 1951 - Jun 1986
- Country: United States
- Allegiance: United States of America
- Branch: Marine Corps
- Type: Aviation ground support squadron
- Role: Engineering/Logistics
- Part of: N/A
- Motto(s): "We Thrive on Adversity"
- Engagements: World War II; Vietnam War

Marine Air Base Squadron 13 (MABS-13) was a unit of the United States Marine Corps that provided airfield services and base operations in support of Marine Aircraft Group 13. Originally commissioned overseas during World War II, MABS-13 supported combat operations during both World War II and the Vietnam War. The squadron was last based at Marine Corps Air Station El Toro, California and was decommissioned in June 1986 when the Marine Corps reorganized all of its aviation ground support units into combat formations that would train and operate the same in both peacetime and combat. Since that date, no other Marine Corps squadron has carried the lineage and honors of MABS-13.

== Mission ==
Provide necessary air base facilities and services (except airfield construction) for Marine Aircraft Group 13 when on an advanced base and supplement base facilities and services provided by a supporting air station or facility when based thereon.

== Subordinate sections ==
- Base Services
- Communications
- Launch and recovery
- Motor Transport
- Tactical Airfield Fuel Dispensing
- Utilities

== History ==
=== World War II ===
Service & Maintenance Squadron 13 was commissioned on 1 August 1942 in Samoa. The squadron's mission was to provide supply, personnel and maintenance support for Marine Aircraft Group 13 (MAG-13). In February 1944 the squadron was moved to Funafuti where it assisted with construction and maintenance activities on the airfield. On 22 March 1944, MAG-13 and SMS-13 moved again, this time to Majuro where it again began construction and maintenance activities at the base. The squadron also inspected, serviced, and prepared 19 Vought F4U Corsairs for shipment. On 15 November 1945, squadron personnel embarked on the USS Makassar Strait at Kwajalein to return to the United States. SMS-13 arrived in San Diego, California on 29 November 1945 and was decommissioned on 30 November 1945 by authority of Marine Corps dispatch 111921.

=== Reactivation & the 1950s ===
Service & Maintenance Squadron 13 was reactivated on 1 March 1951 at Marine Corps Air Station El Toro, California. On 1 July 1951 the squadron was redesignated as Marine Air Base Squadron 13. In February 1952, the squadron relocated to Marine Corps Air Station Kaneohe Bay, Hawaii. From 7-13 April 1956 MABS-13 participated in its first field exercise in Hawaii when it supported Operation Mauka on the island of Kauai. Later that year the squadron also supported Operations Candlepower which simulated a nuclear bomb blast. In September 1958 the squadron deployed to Naval Air Station Atsugi to backfill Marine Air Base Squadron 11 which had been sent to Taiwan during the Second Taiwan Strait Crisis. MABS-13 personnel returned to MCAS Kaneohe Bay in March 1959.

=== Vietnam War ===
In 1965 MABS-13 deployed to Marine Corps Air Station Iwakuni, Japan. In April 1966 the squadron was reassigned to the 9th Marine Amphibious Brigade. The squadron arrived at Chu Lai, South Vietnam on 9 September 1966. For the next four years MABS-13 supported fighter operations from the airfield until 15 September 1970 when Chu Lai was turned over to the United States Army. Squadron personnel and equipment departed South Vietnam in September 1970 via air and sealift with everything returning to Southern California by early December.

=== 1970s & 1980s ===
On 16 December 1970, Marine Air Base Squadron 33 was decommissioned and the personnel and equipment were redesignated as MABS-13 at Marine Corps Air Station El Toro, California. The squadron was responsible for operating the Short Airfield for Tactical Support (SATS) at MCAS El Toro, one of only three operational SATS.

== Unit awards ==
Since the beginning of World War II, the United States military has honored various units for extraordinary heroism or outstanding non-combat service. This information is compiled by the United States Marine Corps History Division and is certified by the Commandant of the Marine Corps. MABS-13 has been awarded the following unit awards:

Streamer	Award	Year(s)	Additional Info
A streamer with red, gold, and blue horizontal stripes with a bronze star in the center	Presidential Unit Citation Streamer	1966	Vietnam War
A green streamer with red, gold, and blue horizontal stripes along the top and bottom with one silver star in the center	Navy Unit Commendation Streamer w/ one bronze star.	1967-68, 1969-70	Vietnam War
	Asiatic-Pacific Campaign Streamer		
	World War II Victory Streamer	1942–1945	Pacific War
A red streamer with a horizontal gold stripe and three bronze stars in the center	National Defense Service Streamer with one Bronze Star.	1951–1954, 1961–1974	Korean War, Vietnam War
A yellow streamer with two green horizontal stripes on the outside and three horizontal red stripes and two silver stars in the center	Vietnam Service Streamer with two Silver Stars		
A gold streamer with red horizontal stripes on the outer portions and a green palm in the center	Vietnam Gallantry Cross with Palm Streamer	1965–1971	

== See also ==
- United States Marine Corps Aviation
- Organization of the United States Marine Corps
- List of United States Marine Corps aviation support units
