= List of United States Marine Corps aviation support units =

This is a list of United States Marine Corps aviation support squadrons and other units, sorted by type.

== Active ==
=== Marine Wing Headquarters Squadrons ===
The Marine Wing Headquarters Squadron (MWHS) provides administrative and supply support for a Marine Aircraft Wing Headquarters (MAW HQ). The MAW HQ is a separate organization that directs and coordinates the operations of the MAW. The MAW HQ contains the wing commander (commanding general) and assistant wing commander, their personal staffs (aides-de-camp, drivers, etc.), and the chief of staff, the general staff divisions (G-1 through G-6), and the special staff departments (public affairs officer, wing inspector, staff judge advocate, wing medical officer, and wing chaplain). The wing commander fights the MAW from his operational command post located in the Tactical Air Command Center (TACC) maintained by the Marine Air Control Group (MACG).

Squadron Name	Insignia	Nickname	Date Commissioned	Senior Command	Station
MWHS-1		America's Finest	7 July 1941	1st MAW	Camp Foster, Okinawa, Japan
MWHS-2		The Deuce; Snake Eyes	31 December 1955	2nd MAW	MCAS Cherry Point, NC
MWHS-3			10 November 1942	3rd MAW	MCAS Miramar, CA

=== Marine Aviation Logistics Squadrons ===
The Marine Aviation Logistics Squadron (MALS) provides direct support of intermediate aircraft maintenance, avionics, aviation supply, and aviation ordnance to the aircraft squadrons of a Marine Aircraft Group. A MALS is capable of supporting multiple types of aircraft, as well as providing detachments for the aviation combat elements of a MEB or MEU.

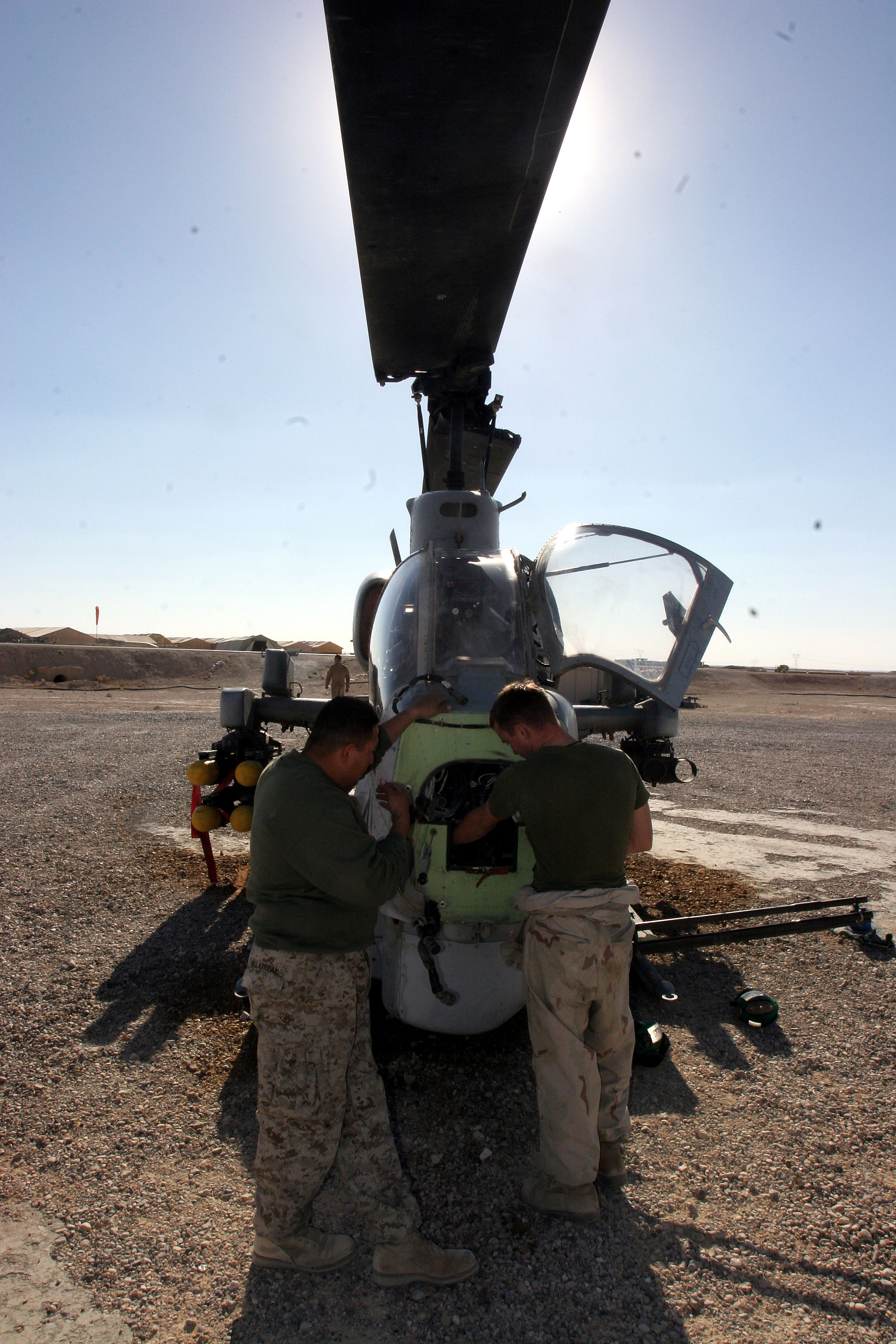
Marines repair weapons systems

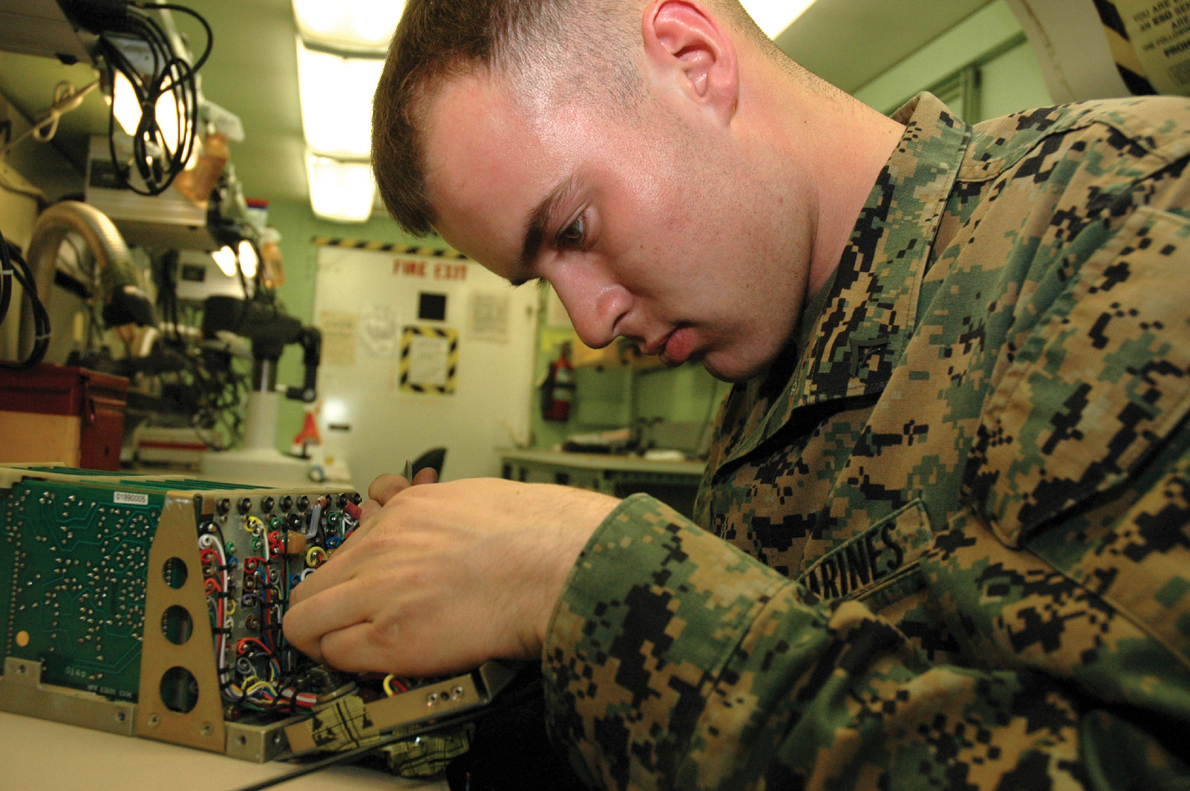
Marine repairs avionics

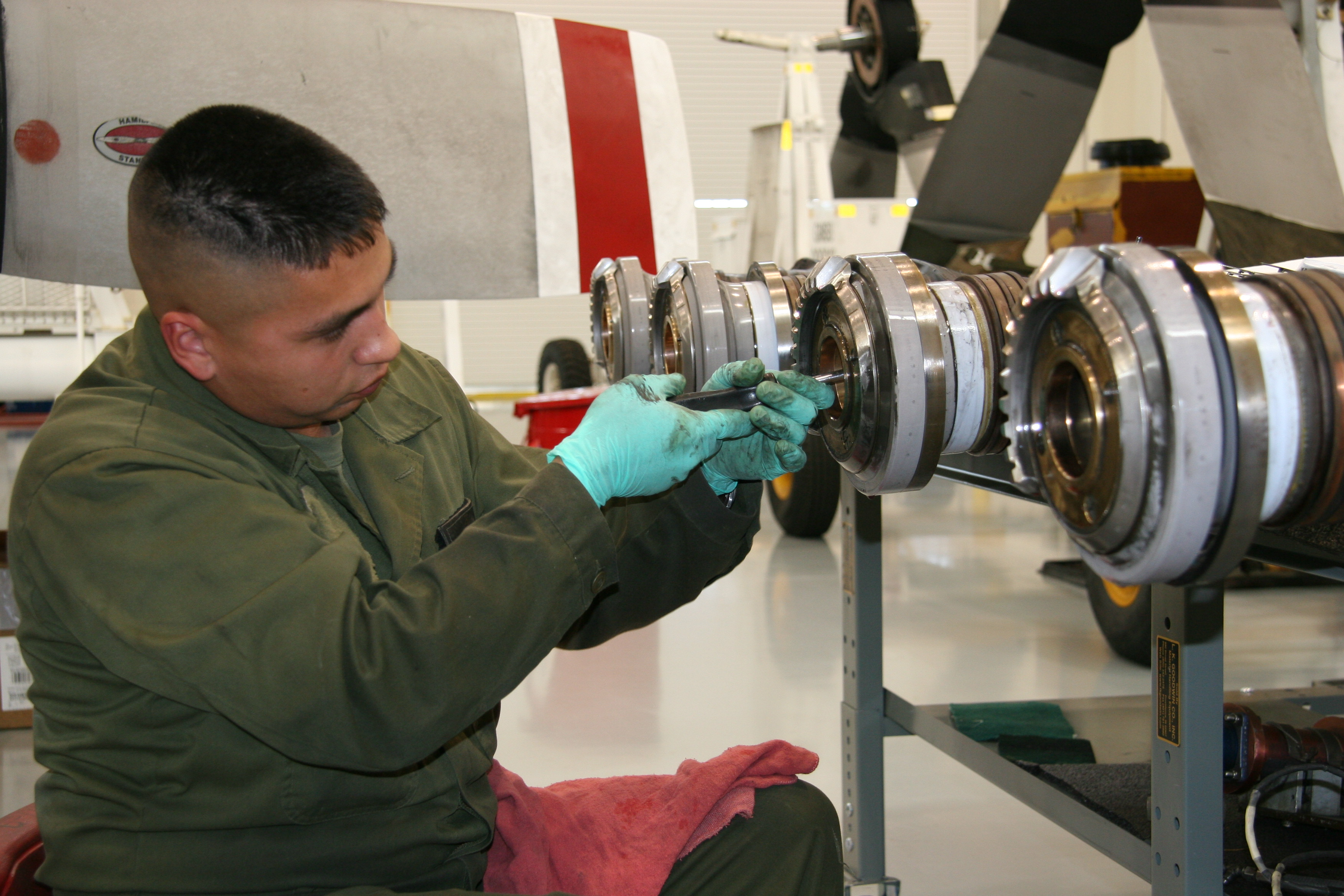
Marine repairs propellers

Squadron Name	Insignia	Nickname	Date Commissioned	Senior Command	Station
MALS-11		Devilfish	1 December 1921	MAG-11, 3rd MAW	MCAS Miramar, CA
MALS-12		Marauders	1 March 1942	MAG-12, 1st MAW	MCAS Iwakuni, Japan
MALS-13		Black Widows	1 March 1942	MAG-13, 3rd MAW	MCAS Yuma, AZ
MALS-14		Dragons	30 September 1988	MAG-14, 2nd MAW	MCAS Cherry Point, NC
MALS-16		Immortals	1 March 1952	MAG-16, 3rd MAW	MCAS Miramar, CA
MALS-24		Warriors	1 March 1942	MAG-24, 1st MAW	MCAF Kaneohe Bay, HI
MALS-26		Patriots	16 June 1952	MAG-26, 2nd MAW	MCAS New River, NC
MALS-29		Wolverines	1 May 1972	MAG-29, 2nd MAW	MCAS New River, NC
MALS-31		Stingers	1 February 1943	MAG-31, 2nd MAW	MCAS Beaufort, SC
MALS-36		Bladerunner	2 June 1952	MAG-36, 1st MAW	MCAS Futenma, Okinawa, Japan
MALS-39		Hellhounds	1 March 1942	MAG-39, 3rd MAW	MCAS Camp Pendleton, CA
MALS-41		Wranglers	1 January 1943	MAG-41, 4th MAW	NASJRB Fort Worth, TX
MALS-42		War Hammers	18 June 1992	MAG-42, 4th MAW	NAS Atlanta, GA
MALS-49		Magicians	1 July 1969	MAG-49, 4th MAW	Stewart ANGB, NY

=== Marine Air Control Squadrons ===
MACS are responsible for air traffic control and operate the Tactical Air Operations Center (TAOC), which directs antiair warfare (to include ground-based anti-aircraft weapons), early warning & intercept control, air surveillance, radar control, and airspace management.

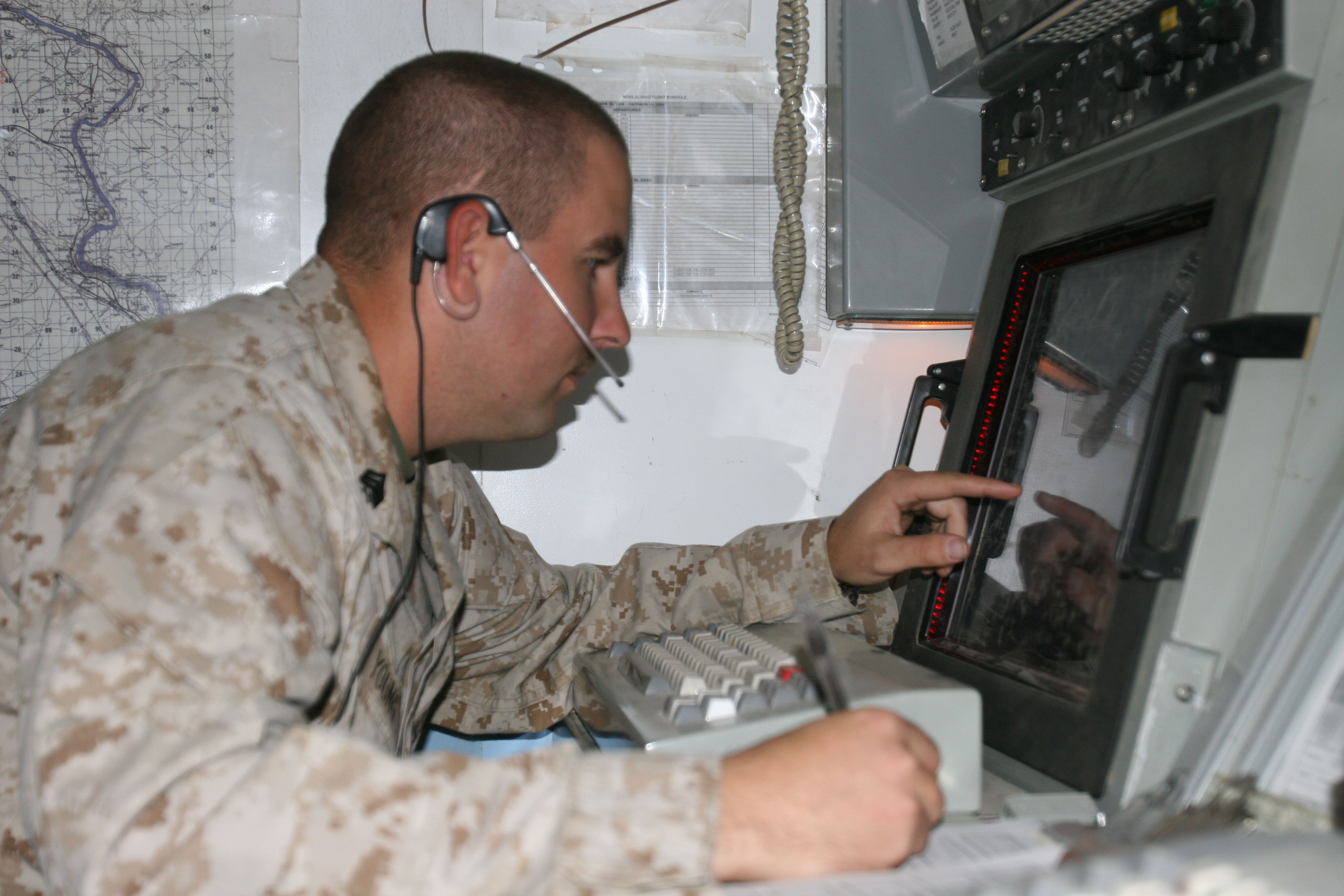
Air Traffic Controller at work

Squadron Name	Insignia	Nickname	Date Commissioned	Senior Command	Station
MACS-1		Falconers	1 September 1943	MACG-38, 3rd MAW	MCAS Yuma, AZ
MACS-2		Eyes of the MAGTF	1 April 1944	MACG-28, 2nd MAW	MCAS Cherry Point, NC
MACS-4		Vice Squad	5 May 1944	MACG-18, 1st MAW	MCAS Futenma, Okinawa, Japan
MACS-24		Earthquake	15 October 1949	MACG-48, 4th MAW	Virginia Beach, VA

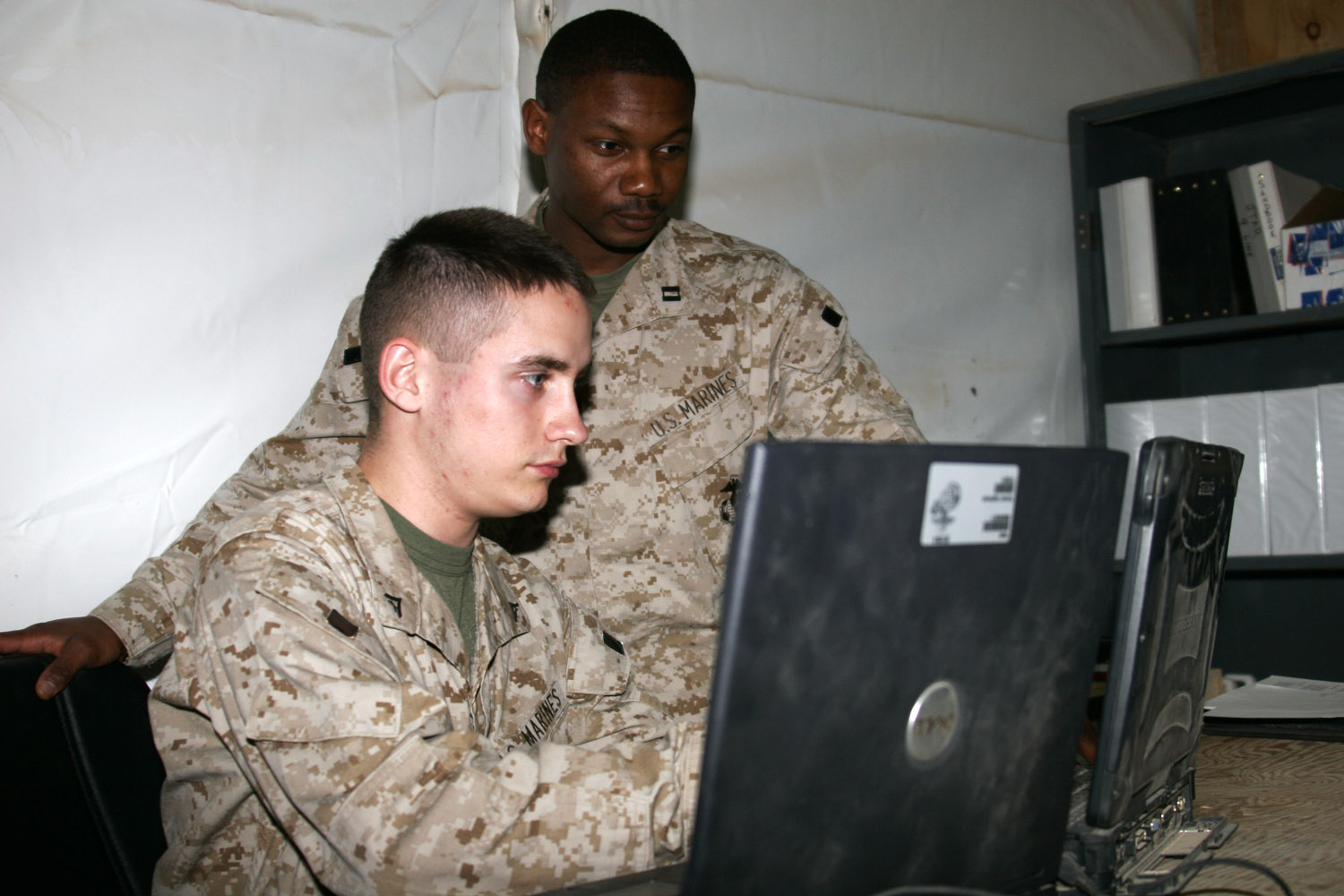
Marines maintain information networking

=== Marine Air Support Squadrons ===
MASSs provide the Direct Air Support Center (DASC) which controls and coordinates those tactical aircraft operations directly supporting ground forces. They are responsible for the processing of immediate requests (e.g. Close Air Support, CASEVAC, and Assault Support), integrate and deconflict indirect fire support (e.g., artillery and mortars) with aviation assets, manage terminal control assets, and procedurally controlling aircraft.

Squadron Name	Insignia	Nickname	Date Commissioned	Senior Command	Station
MASS-1		Atlantic Nomads	25 June 1943	MACG-28, 2nd MAW	MCAS Cherry Point, NC
MASS-2		Pacific Vagabonds	1 January 1943	MACG-18, 1st MAW	MCAS Futenma, Okinawa, Japan
MASS-3		Blacklist	3 August 1950	MACG-38, 3rd MAW	MCAS Camp Pendleton, CA
MASS-6		Lighthouse	15 May 1947	MACG-48, 4th MAW	MCAS Miramar, CA

=== Marine Tactical Air Command Squadrons ===
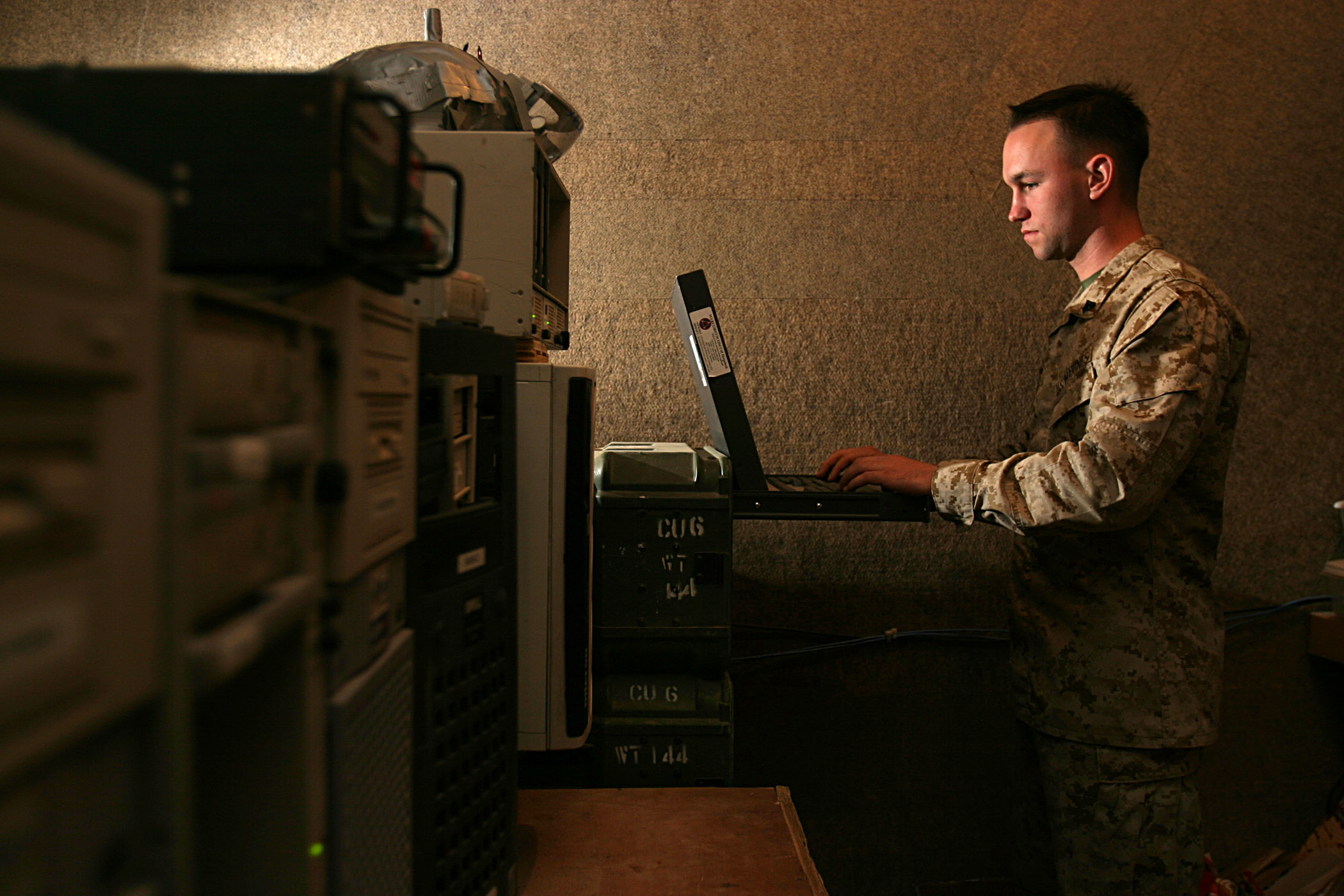
Marine interfaces the Global Command and Control System.

MTACS provide the ACE commander with command and control functions necessary for the aviation mission. They establish a Tactical Air Command Center (TACC), which is the operational command post for the Marine Aircraft Wing, from which the Wing Commander and his battle staff command the tactical air battle, including tactical air support provided to ground forces (directed from the DASC in the MASS) and tactical air defense (directed by the TAOC in the MACS). As part of Force Design 2030, all of the active duty MTACS have been decommissioned with their functionality moved to the Marine Air Control Group headquarters.

Squadron Name	Insignia	Nickname	Date Commissioned	Senior Command	Station
MTACS-48			1 September 1967	MACG-48, 4th MAW	NS Great Lakes, IL

=== Marine Wing Communications Squadrons ===
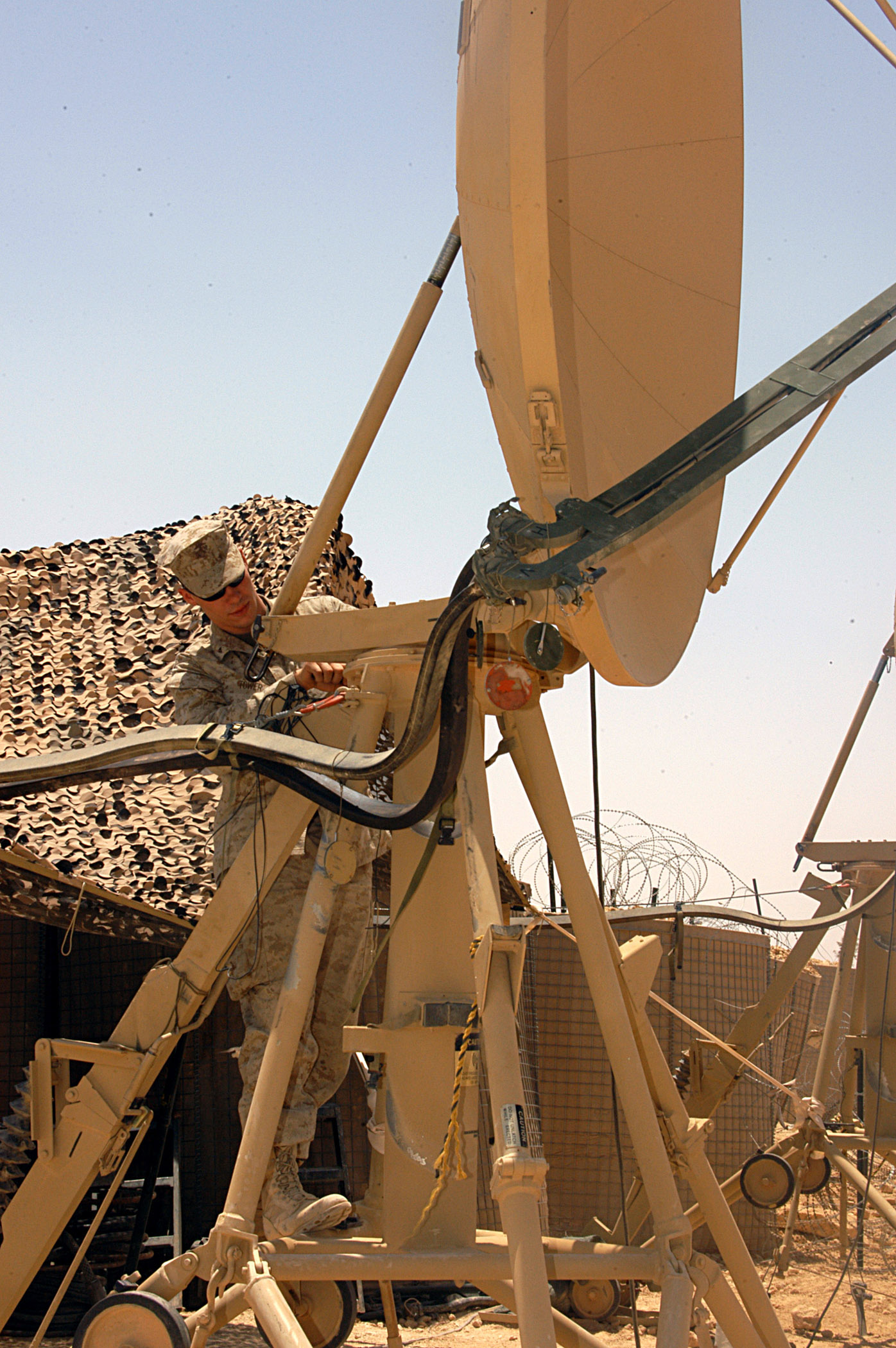
Marine adjusts antenna for AN/TRC-170

MWCSs provide all communication assets for the ACE, including radio, satellite, wire, and data technology.

Squadron Name	Insignia	Nickname	Date Commissioned	Senior Command	Station
MWCS-18		Warriors	1 September 1967	MACG-18, 1st MAW	MCAS Futenma, Okinawa, Japan
MWCS-28		Spartans	1 September 1967	MACG-28, 2nd MAW	MCAS Cherry Point, NC
MWCS-38		Red Lightning	1 September 1967	MACG-38, 3rd MAW	MCAS Miramar, CA
MWCS-48		Roar of the Corps	10 April 1952	MACG-48, 4th MAW	NS Great Lakes, IL

=== Littoral Anti-Air Battalions ===
The Marine Corps activated its first Littoral Anti-Air Battalion (LAAB) on 11 February 2022. LAABs are designed to provide ground based air defense, early warning, tactical air control, and Forward arming and refuelling points in support of Marine Corps littoral operations.

Battalion Name	Insignia	Nickname	Date Commissioned	Senior Command	Station
3rd LAAB			July 20, 1937	3d MLR, 3d MARDIV	Marine Corps Base Hawaii
12th LAAB			July 20, 1937	12th MLR, 3d MARDIV	Camp Hansen, Okinawa, Japan

=== Low Altitude Air Defense Battalions ===
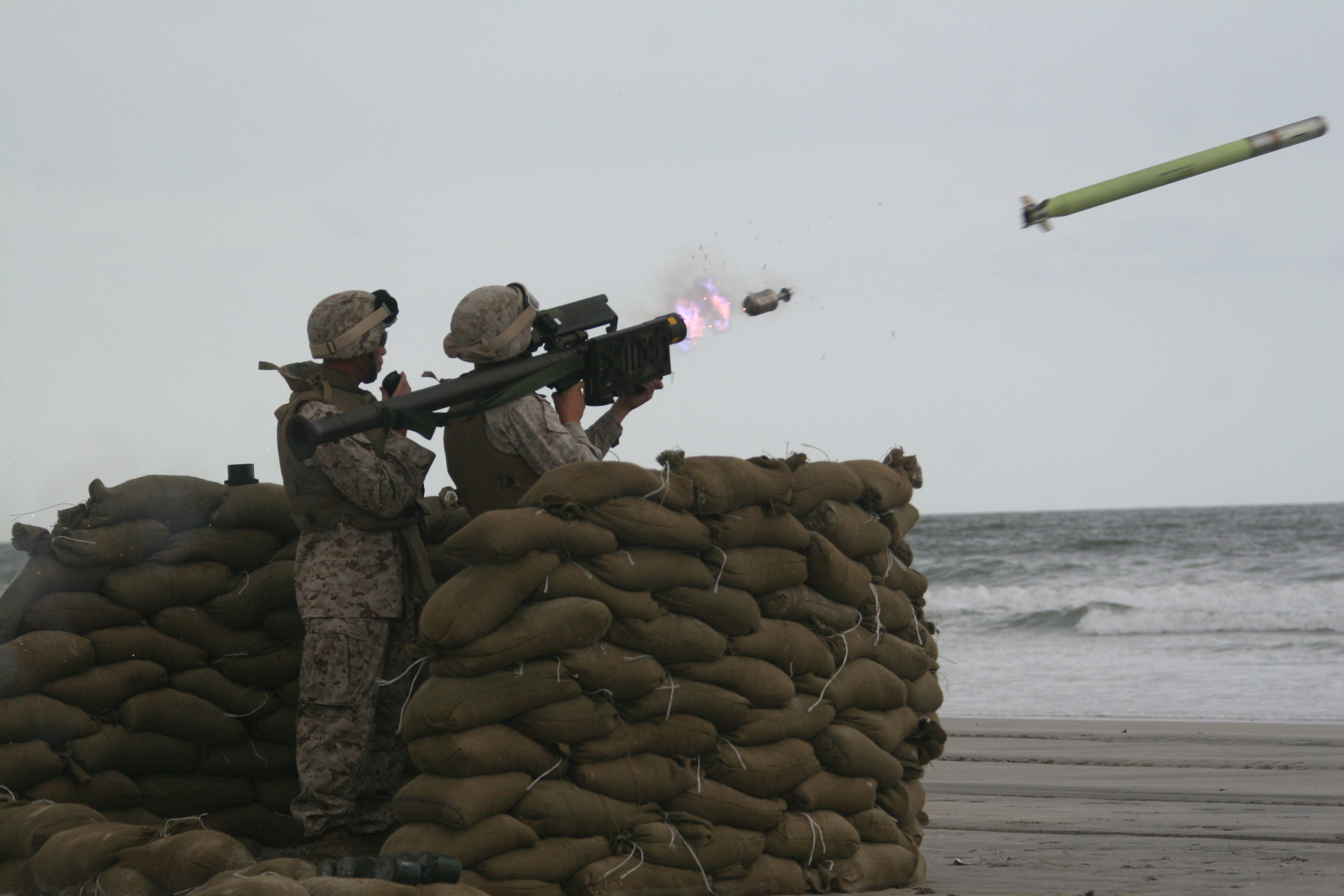
LAAD Marines fire a FIM-92 Stinger

LAAD Battalions are responsible for close air defense protection of assets within the area of operation, with a secondary mission of local ground security for ACE elements. They are armed with surface to air weapons, as well as early warning and detection equipment. Currently, LAAD battalions are equipped with the FIM-92 Stinger, a man-portable surface-to-air missile, and the M2 .50 cal machinegun. The M1097 Avenger missile-equipped HMMWV has been retired by Marine forces.

Battalion Name	Insignia	Nickname	Date Commissioned	Senior Command	Station
1st LAAD Bn		Death From Below	20 June 1982	MACG-18, 1st MAW	MCAS Kaneohe Bay, HI
2nd LAAD Bn		Death from Below	26 February 1969	MACG-28, 2nd MAW	MCAS Cherry Point, NC
3rd LAAD Bn		Feel the Sting	20 June 1982	MACG-38, 3rd MAW	MCAS Camp Pendleton, CA

=== Marine Wing Support Squadrons ===
The MWSS provides all essential aviation ground support to the MAG to operate an airfield. This support includes: (1) airfield services (aviation terminal operations, airfield expeditionary systems/ air field lighting, and aircraft crash rescue and firefighting/ emergency services), 2) communications (less air traffic control services), (3) motor transport, (4) engineer services (construction, maintenance, and utilities), 4) bulk fuel delivery and containment, (5) aircraft refueling, (6) non-aviation (i.e., "ground") supply, (7) non-aviation equipment maintenance, (8) local security, (9) food service, and (10) medical services (provided by U.S. Navy personnel).

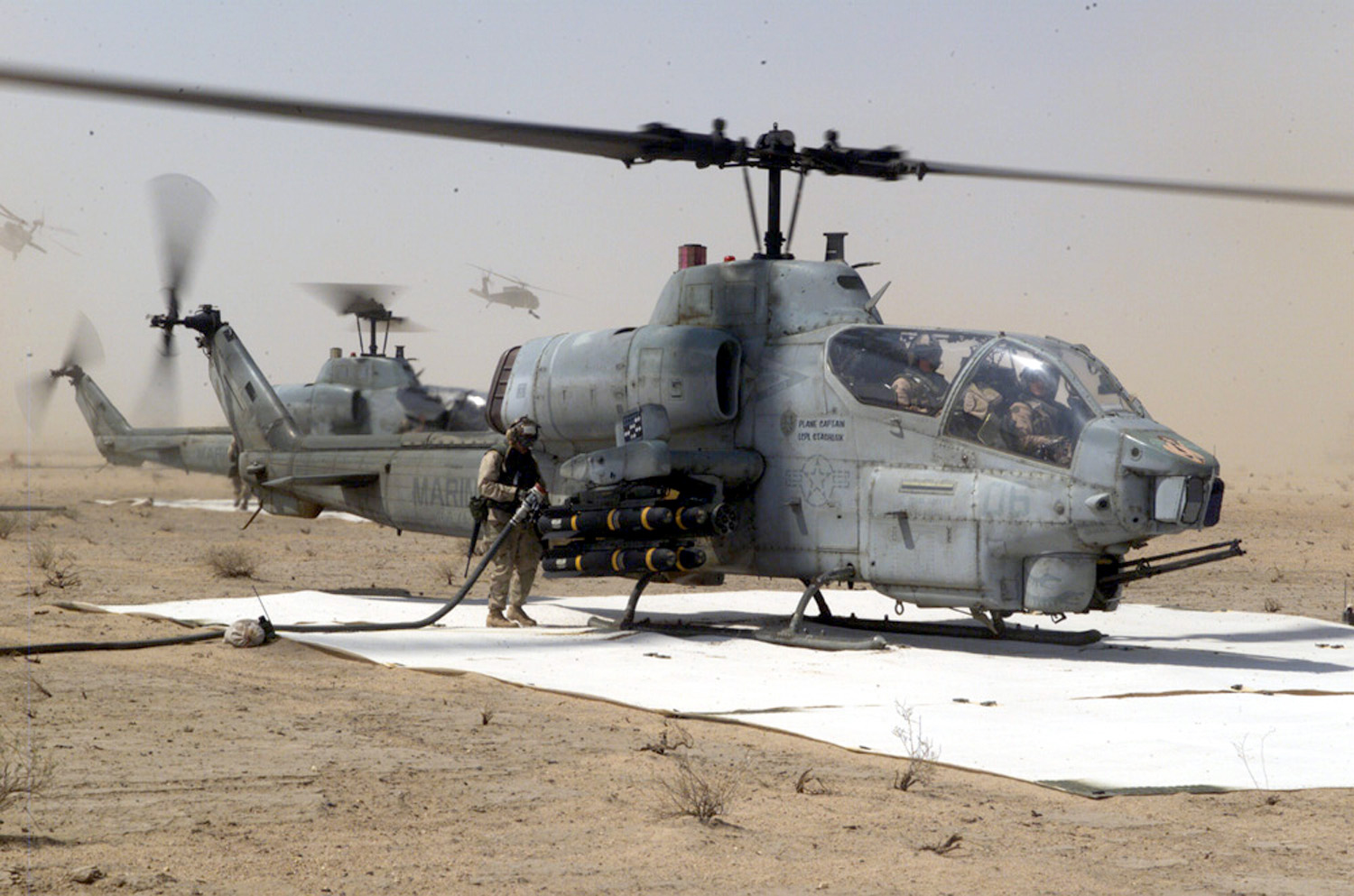
Marines refuel an AH-1W helicopter

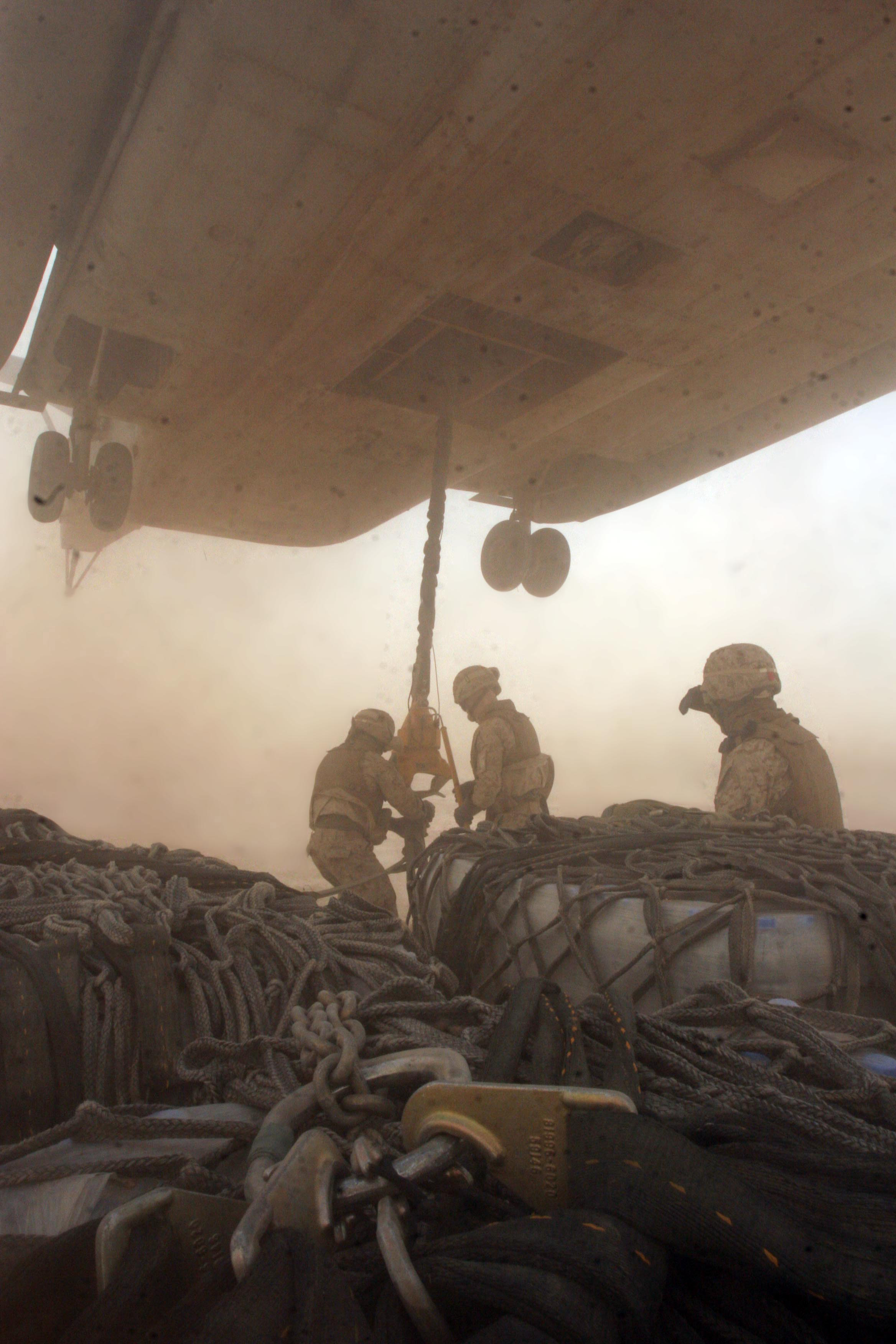
Marines perform a vertical replenishment

Squadron Name	Insignia	Nickname	Date Commissioned	Senior Command	Station
MWSS-171		America's Squadron	16 April 1979	MAG-12, 1st MAW	MCAS Iwakuni, Japan
MWSS-172		Firebirds	16 June 1986	MAG-36, 1st MAW	MCAS Futenma, Okinawa, Japan
MWSS-174		Gryphons	1988	MAG-24, 1st MAW	MCAS Kaneohe Bay, Hawaii
MWSS-271		Workhorse of the Wing	6 June 1986	MAG-14, 2nd MAW	MCAS Cherry Point, NC
MWSS-272		Untouchables	26 February 1969	MAG-26, 2nd MAW	MCAS New River, NC
MWSS-273		Sweathogs	13 June 1986	MAG-31, 2nd MAW	MCAS Beaufort, SC
MWSS-371		Sand Sharks	2 June 1986	MAG-13, 3rd MAW	MCAS Yuma, AZ
MWSS-372		Diamondbacks	1 July 1977	MAG-39, 3rd MAW	MCAS Camp Pendleton, CA
MWSS-373		Ace Support	1 April 1967	MAG-11, 3rd MAW	MCAS Miramar, CA
MWSS-471		Red Wolves		MAG-41, 4th MAW	Minneapolis, MN
MWSS-472		AGS-Dragons	1 October 1988	MAG-49, 4th MAW	NAS JRB Willow Grove, PA
MWSS-473		Gargoyle	1 July 1963	MAG-41, 4th MAW	MCAS Miramar, CA

=== Headquarters and Headquarters Squadrons ===
A H&HS usually consists of the headquarters group (the station commanding general/commanding officer and staff), the squadron headquarters (commanding officer and staff), public affairs and journalism, facilities planning & maintenance, billeting and family housing offices, station motor pool, air traffic control, meteorology, fuels, ordnance, other aviation support, Aircraft Rescue and Firefighting, Provost Marshal section, station Judge Advocate's Office, station Chaplain, Navy medical facility, and Marine Corps Community Service, which usually hosts services such as a Marine Corps Exchamge (MCX) (i.e., post exchange), commissary, gas station, barber shop, dry cleaner, library, theater, golf course, bowling center, fitness, recreation, hobby, craft and auto repair center(s), swimming pool, officer, SNCO, NCO clubs, family services, Single Marine Program, and other personal services vendors.

Squadron Name	Insignia	Nickname
Headquarters and Headquarters Squadron, Marine Corps Air Station Beaufort		Swamp Foxes
Headquarters and Headquarters Squadron, Marine Corps Air Station Cherry Point		Rams
Headquarters and Headquarters Squadron, Marine Corps Air Station New River		
Headquarters and Headquarters Squadron, Marine Corps Air Station Camp Pendleton		Stampede
Headquarters and Headquarters Squadron, Marine Corps Air Station Miramar		Grizzly
Headquarters and Headquarters Squadron, Marine Corps Air Station Yuma		Guardians
Headquarters and Headquarters Squadron, Marine Corps Air Station Iwakuni		Torii
Headquarters and Headquarters Squadron, Marine Corps Air Station Futenma		Magic

=== Combat Logistics Companies ===
Combat Logistics Companies, while subordinate to a Marine Logistics Group provide intermediate ground logistics support to aviation units, to include supply and maintenance beyond organic capabilities. All Marine air stations not in proximity to a Marine Logistics Group have a tenant company.

== Decommissioned ==
Squadrons/Detachments are listed by their last designation.

=== GCI & Early Warning Detachments (1941-1943) ===
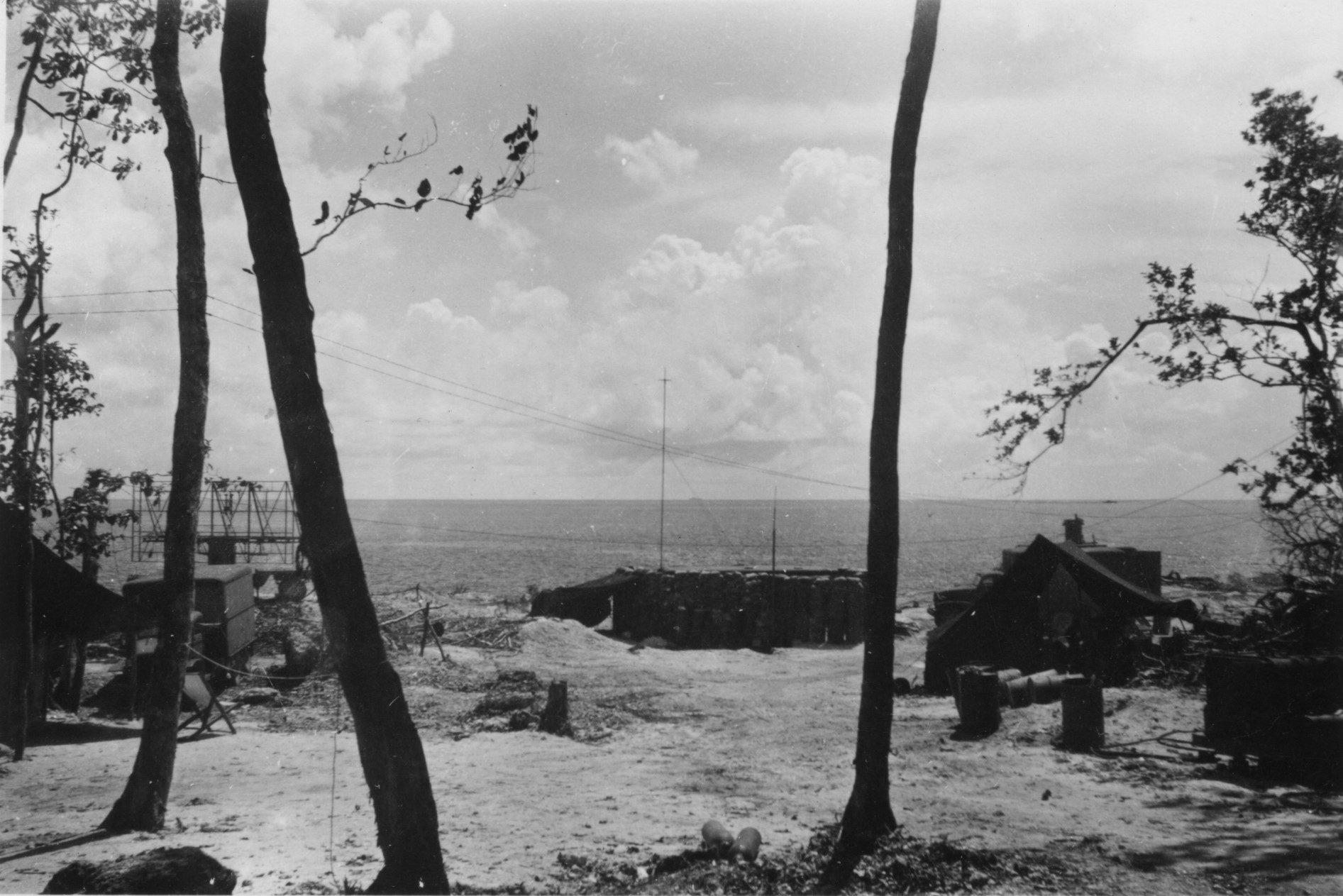
VMF(N)-531 GCI Detachment's SCR-527 on Stirling Island in early 1944

Detachment Name	Date Began	Date ended
Marine Detachment, Air Warning Service, Philippines (1941-42)	November 1941	8 April 1942
Marine Corps Early Warning Detachment, Guadalcanal (1942-43)	June 1942	February 1943
VMF(N)-531 GCI Detachment (Vella Levella / Stirling Island)	16 November 1942	3 September 1944

=== Air Warning Squadrons ===
The Marine Corps' air warning squadrons were established during World War II and were tasked with providing early warning of enemy aircraft and ground control intercept against enemy aircraft during the initial phases of any amphibious landing. The first AWS was commissioned in September 1943 with a total of 19 being stood up during the war. On 1 August 1946 all remaining AWS were redesignated as Marine Ground Control Intercept Squadrons.

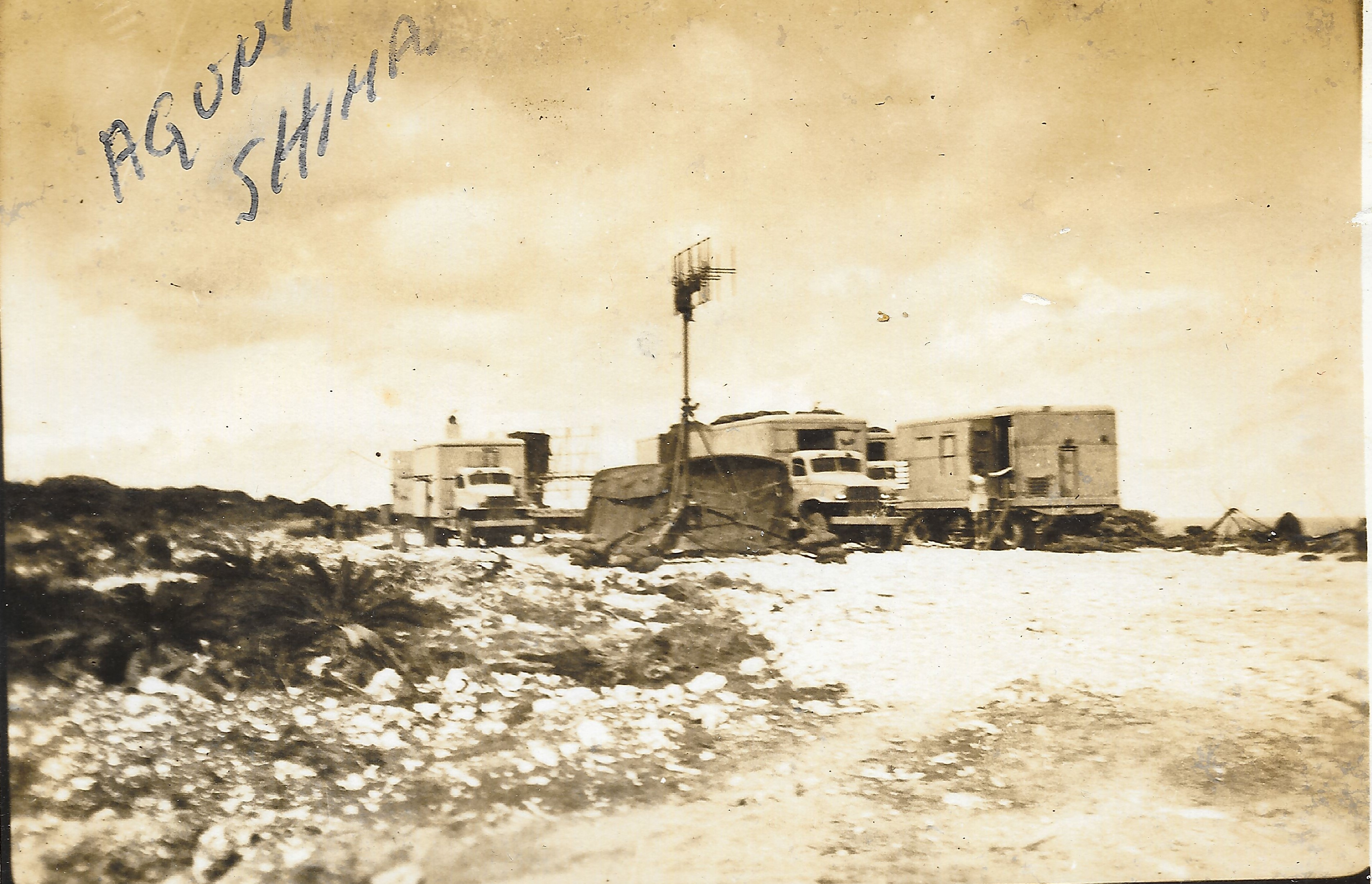
Radar vans from Air Warning Squadron 8 on Aguni Shima during the Battle of Okinawa.

Squadron Name	Date Commissioned	Date Decommissioned
Air Warning Squadron 2	1 September 1943	15 February 1946
Air Warning Squadron 3	12 October 1943	15 October 1945
Air Warning Squadron 4	12 October 1943	31 October 1945
Air Warning Squadron 6	1 January 1944	28 February 1946
Air Warning Squadron 8	1 March 1944	12 March 1946
Air Warning Squadron 9	1 April 1944	8 December 1945
Air Warning Squadron 14	1 June 1944	30 November 1945

=== Assault Air Warning Squadrons ===
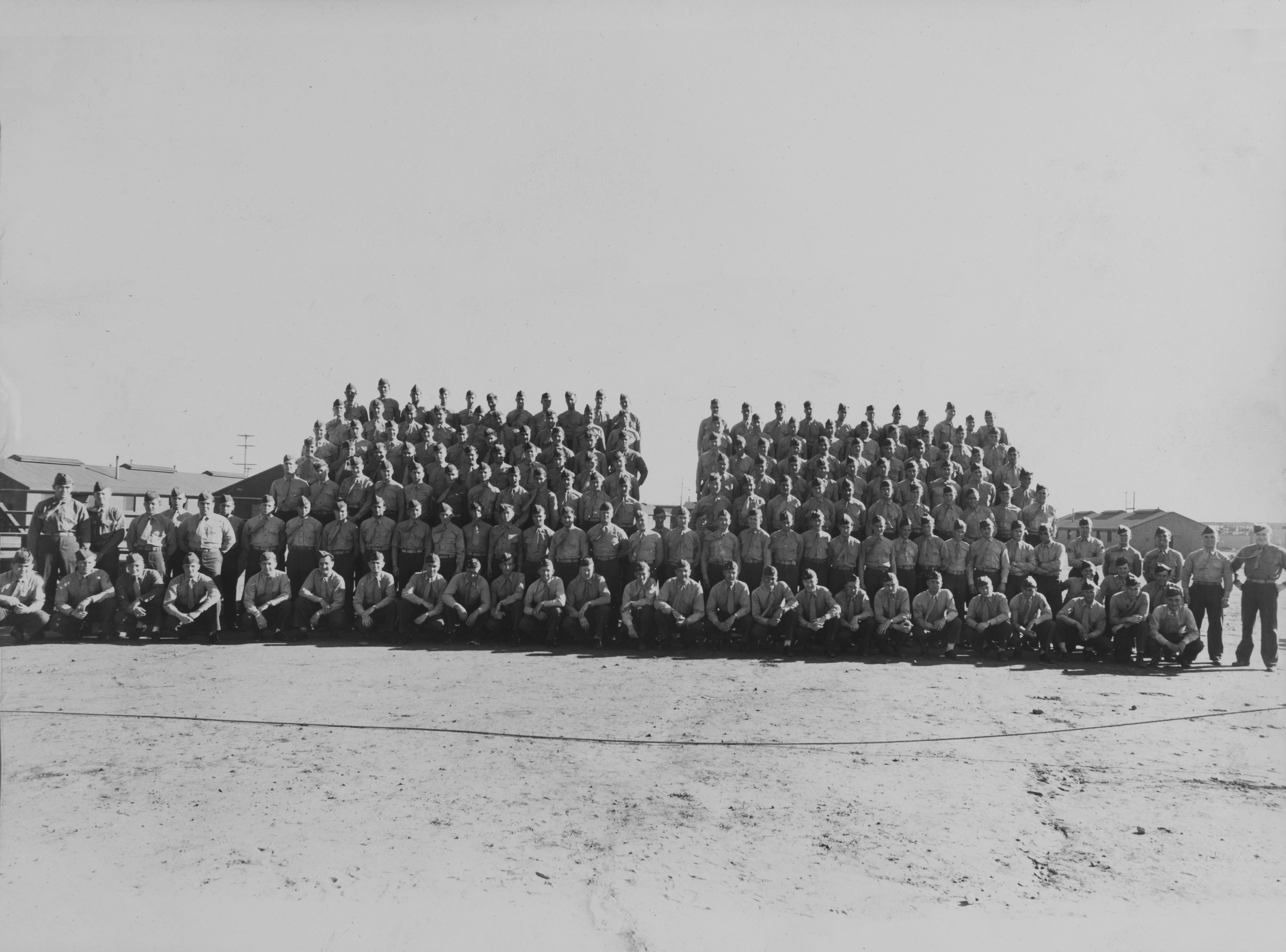
Squadron photo of AWS(AT)-5 taken at MCAD Miramar in March 1944.

Assault Air Warning Squadrons were United States Marine Corps aviation command and control units formed during World War II to provide early warning, aerial surveillance, and ground controlled interception during the early phases of an amphibious landing. These squadrons were supposed to be fielded lightweight radars and control center gear in order to operate for a limited duration at the beginning of any operation until larger air warning squadrons came ashore. They were originally formed as Air Warning Squadron (Air Transportable) however their designators changed in July/August 1944 due to the inability to field an air transportable radar. Four of these squadrons were commissioned during the war with one, AWS(AT)-5, taking part in the Battle of Saipan. All four squadrons were decommissioned in November 1944.

Squadron Name	Date Commissioned	Date Decommissioned
Assault Air Warning Squadron 5	1 December 1943	10 November 1944
Assault Air Warning Squadron 10	1 January 1944	10 November 1944
Assault Air Warning Squadron 15	1 February 1944.	10 November 1944
Assault Air Warning Squadron 20	1 March 1944	10 November 1944

=== Aircraft Engineering Squadrons ===
Aircraft Engineering Squadrons were responsible for training aircraft maintenance and service personnel. The squadrons were originally formed during World War II and were in existence into the early 1950s.

Squadron Name	Date Commissioned	Date Decommissioned
Aircraft Engineering Squadron 11		
Aircraft Engineering Squadron 12		
Aircraft Engineering Squadron 13		
Aircraft Engineering Squadron 21		
Aircraft Engineering Squadron 22		
Aircraft Engineering Squadron 23		
Aircraft Engineering Squadron 24		
Aircraft Engineering Squadron 31	1 April 1942	
Aircraft Engineering Squadron 41		
Aircraft Engineering Squadron 42	12 May 1942	
Aircraft Engineering Squadron 43	7 July 1942	
Aircraft Engineering Squadron 44	5 August 1943	31 May 1946
Aircraft Engineering Squadron 45	5 August 1943	

=== Landing Force Air Support Control Units ===
Squadron Name	Date Commissioned	Date Decommissioned
Landing Force Air Support Control Unit 1	November 1944	10 September 1945
Landing Force Air Support Control Unit 2	January 1945	11 September 1945
Landing Force Air Support Control Unit 3	January 1945	6 March 1946
Landing Force Air Support Control Unit 4	February 1945	19 November 1945

=== Light Anti-Aircraft Missile battalions ===
Squadron Name	Insignia	Nickname	Date Commissioned	Date Decommissioned
2d Light Antiaircraft Missile Battalion		Blackhawks	1 August 1960	1 September 1994
4th Light Anti-Aircraft Missile Battalion			1 December 1961	1 October 1997
5th Light Antiaircraft Missile Battalion			1 July 1966	31 January 1969

=== Low Altitude Air Defense Battalions ===
Squadron Name	Insignia	Nickname	Date Commissioned	Date Decommissioned
4th Low Altitude Air Defense Battalion			1 October 1972	March 2005

=== Marine Air Base Squadrons ===
Squadron Name	Insignia	Nickname	Date Commissioned	Date Decommissioned
MABS-11			1 December 1951	
MABS-12			1 December 1951	
MABS-13			1 August 1942	June 1986
MABS-14			1 December 1951	
MABS-15			1 December 1951	1 October 1988
MABS-16			1 March 1952	
MABS-17			1 July 1953	
MABS-24			1 March 1942	
MABS-26			16 June 1952	5 June 1986
MABS-27			1 July 1953	31 March 1967
MABS-29				
MABS-31			17 March 1952	13 June 1986
MABS-32			8 May 1952	6 June 1986
MABS-33			1 December 1951	6 June 1986
MABS-35				1 July 1953
MABS-36			2 June 1952	6 June 1986
MABS-42				
MABS-43			1 May 1967	
MABS-46			1 September 1962	1 October 1988 re-designated MWSS-472
MABS-49				
MABS-56			31 January 1967	15 July 1972

=== Headquarters & Maintenance Squadrons & Marine Aviation Logistics Squadrons ===
Squadron Name	Insignia	Nickname	Date Commissioned	Date Decommissioned
H&MS-15			15 February 1954	1 October 1988
H&MS-16				
H&MS-17				
H&MS-20				
H&MS-25			1 June 1951	31 January 1956
H&MS-27				
H&MS-30			20 January 1966	31 March 1972
MALS-32			1 February 1943	1993
H&MS-33			1 February 1943	15 December 1970
H&MS-35				19 June 1959
H&MS-37			1 July 1953	
MALS-40				
MALS-46				2009
H&MS-56			31 January 1967	15 July 1971

=== Marine Aircraft and Maintenance Squadrons ===
Squadron Name	Insignia	Nickname	Date Commissioned	Date Decommissioned
MAMS-27				31 March 1967
MAMS-37				1 April 1967

=== Marine Air Control Squadrons ===
Squadron Name	Insignia	Nickname	Date Commissioned	Date Decommissioned	
MACS-3			1 May 1944	1 July 1970	
MACS-5			1 June 1944	11 June 1993	
MACS-6		Watch Dogs	10 August 1944	9 December 1998	
MACS-7		The Guiding Hand	1 February 1944.	30 September 1998	
MACS-8			1 September 1944	15 June 1971	
MACS-9			31 May 1952	30 June 1971	
MACS-15 (NAS Atlanta, GA)			1 November 1946		
MACS-16 (NAS Minneapolis, MN)			1 December 1946	31 August 1962	
MACS-17 (NASJRB Willow Grove, PA)			1 February 1947	31 December 1973	
MACS-18 (NAS Los Alamitos, CA)			1 February 1946	30 June 1962	
MACS-19 (NAS Groose Ile, MI)			1 April 1947	31 August 1962	
MACS-20 (NASJRB Dallas, TX)			16 May 1947	14 March 1969	
MACS-21 (NAS South Weymouth, MA)			15 May 1947	1 April 1967	MASS-6 carries the lineage of MACS-21
MACS-22 (NAS Glenview, IL)			30 June 1947	3 April 1967	
MACS-23 (Aurora, CO)			16 October 1949	16 September 2012	
MACS-25 (NAS Columbus, OH)				31 August 1962	Moved to Oakland, CA on March 21, 1959.

=== Marine Air Support Squadrons ===
Squadron Name	Insignia	Nickname	Date Commissioned	Date Decommissioned
MASS-4			1 July 1962	28 February 1989
MASS-5			1 August 1966	28 November 1969

=== Marine Air Traffic Control Units ===
Marine Air Traffic Control Units (MATCU) were air traffic control (ATC) detachments that provided continuous, all-weather, radar and non-radar, approach, departure, enroute, and tower ATC services at both garrison Marine Corps Air Stations and tactical airfields when deployed. MATCUs possessed Tactical air navigation systems (TACAN) and Ground-controlled approach (GCA) equipment which assisted Marine Corps, joint and coalition aircraft in conducting landings during inclement weather. During the Vietnam War, numerous MATCUs served throughout the I Corps Tactical region of South Vietnam supporting the III Marine Amphibious Force. Beginning in the mid-1970s, the Marine Corps decided to consolidate regionally aligned MATCUs into Marine Air Traffic Control Squadrons. The last reserve MATCU was decommissioned in 1980.

Squadron Name	Locations	Insignia	Date Commissioned	Date Decommissioned	Notes
MATCU-60	MCAS New River (1952); MCAAF Edenton (1952–53); NAS Atsugi(1953-1976); MCAS Iwakuni (1976-1978)		1 January 1952	1 October 1978	Commissioned 1 January 1952 as MATCU-7 under MGCIS-7. Redesignated as MATCU-31 under MAG-31 on 1 April 1952. Redesignated as MATCU-11 under MAG-11 on 2 August 1953. Redesignated again as MATCU-60 on 8 February 1954.
MATCU-61	MCAS Cherry Point (1953–76)		11 September 1953	23 April 1976	Commissioned 8 September 1953 as MATCU-14 under MABS-14. Redesignated as MATCU-61 on 1 October 1953.
MATCU-62	MCAS Santa Ana (1951–52); MCAS El Toro (1952-55); MCAS Kaneohe Bay (1955–66); South Vietnam (1966-70); MCAS Iwakuni (1970–72); RTAB Nam Phong (1972-73); MCAS Iwakuni (1972–78)		23 August 1951	1 October 1978	Commissioned 23 August 1951 as MATCU-4 under MGCIS-4. Redesignated as MATCU-15 under MAG-15 on 1 April 1952. Redesignated again as MATCU-62 on 10 February 1954.
MATCU-63	MCAS Cherry Point (1953-1957); MCAS Beaufort (1957- 1976)		8 September 1953	23 April 1976	Commissioned 8 September 1953 as MATCU-24 under MAG-24. Redesignated as MATCU-63 on 30 September 1953.
MATCU-64	MCAS Miami (1953-1958); MCAS New River (1958-1976)		8 September 1953	23 April 1976	Commissioned 8 September 1953 at MATCU-32 under MABS-32. Redesignated to MATCU-64 on 1 October 1953.
MATCU-65	Korea (1954–56); MCAS Mojave (1956–58); MCAS Yuma (1958–76)		7 February 1954	27 April 1976	MATCU-65 inherited personnel and equipment from GCA Unit 41M and MATCU-33 but did not assume either unit's lineage.
MATCU-66	MCAS El Toro (1947–50); Korean War (1950); Itami AFB (1951–53); NAS Atsugi (1953-62); RTAB Udorn (1962); NAS Atsugi (1962–65); MCAS Iwakuni (1965–66); MCAF Futenma (1966-78); Det A - Quang Tri (1968)		6 March 1947	1 October 1978	GCA Unit 37M was designated as such on 6 March 1947 and became operational at MCAS EL Toro on 10 March 1947. The first of its kind in the Marine Corps. The unit was redesignated as MATCU-66 on 1 January 1955.
MATCU-67	MCAS Futenma (1959 - 1965); Chu Lai (1965–70); MCAS Santa Ana (1970–76)		15 December 1959	27 April 1976	
MATCU-68	MCAS El Toro (Unk - 1965); South Vietnam (1965-1971); MCAS Futenma (1971-1972); MCAF Quantico (1972–76)			23 April 1976	
MATCU-69	MCAS Beaufort			23 April 1976	
MATCU-70	MCAS El Toro (1965–66); MCAS Kaneohe Bay (1966–78)		1 June 1965	1 October 1978	
MATCU-71	NAS Twin Cities (1962 - 1967); NAS Memphis (1967 - 1977); MCAS El Toro (1977 - 1980)		1962	31 May 1980	MATCU-71 was formed in 1962 when Marine Air Control Squadron 16 was decommissioned at NAS Twin Cities.
MATCU-72	NAS Alameda		1 September 1962	31 May 1980	
MATCU-73	Naval Air Station South Weymouth; Naval Air Station New York; Naval Air Station Willow Grove (1967-1980)		1 June 1950	31 May 1980	
MATCU-74	MCAS Tustin		15 January 1968	27 April 1976	
MATCU-75	Marine Corps Air Station Camp Pendleton		31 December 1968	27 April 1976	
MATCU-76	Naval Air Station South Weymouth		1 May 1967		
MATCU-77	Marine Corps Air Station El Toro		30 June 1969	30 September 1971	
MATCU-78	Marine Corps Air Station New River; Marine Corps Air Station Quantico		30 June 1969	15 January 1972	

=== Marine Air Traffic Control Squadrons ===
The Marine Air Traffic Control Squadrons (MATCS) were formed through the consolidation of regionally aligned Marine Air Traffic Control Units, underneath each Marine Air Wing. The first MATCS was commissioned in 1976 with the last one commissioning in the reserves in 1980. The MATCS provided all-weather, air traffic control services at expeditionary airfields and remote area landing sites in support of Fleet Marine Force operations as part of the Marine Air Command and Control System (MACCS).

Squadron Name	Insignia	Nickname	Date Commissioned	Date Decommissioned	
MATCS-18			1 October 1978	30 September 1994	
MATCS-28		Intrepid Sentinels	23 April 1976	22 July 1994	
MATCS-38			27 April 1976	30 September 1994	
MATCS-48			1 June 1980	30 September 1994	Det A decommissioned on 6 June 1992, Det B became MACS-24 Det A, Det C became MACS-24 Det B

=== Marine Tactical Air Control Squadrons ===
Squadron Name	Insignia	Nickname	Date Commissioned	Date Decommissioned
MTACS-18		TACC of Excellence	1 September 1967	9 June 2021
MTACS-28		Olympians	1 October 1947	18 November 2022
MTACS-38		Fire Chickens	1 September 1967	19 November 2021

=== Marine Wing Support Squadrons ===
Squadron Name	Insignia	Nickname	Date Commissioned	Date Decommissioned
MWSS-173		Gryphons		4 March 1993
MWSS-274		Ironmen	2 June 1986	21 May 2021
MWSS-374		Rhinos	1 April 1999	31 March 2022

=== Wing Equipment Repair Squadrons ===
Squadron Name	Insignia	Nickname	Date Commissioned	Date Decommissioned	
WERS-17			1 July 1953		MABS-17 was redesignated as WERS-17 on 1 September 1966
WERS-27					
WERS-37			1 July 1953		MABS-37 was redesignated as WERS-37 on 1 April 1967
WERS-47			1 May 1967		

== See also ==
- United States Marine Corps aviation
- List of United States Marine Corps aircraft groups
- List of decommissioned United States Marine Corps aircraft squadrons
- List of United States Marine Corps battalions
- List of United States Marine Corps installations
