= MATCS-38 =

US Marine Corps unit

Marine Air Traffic Control Squadron 38
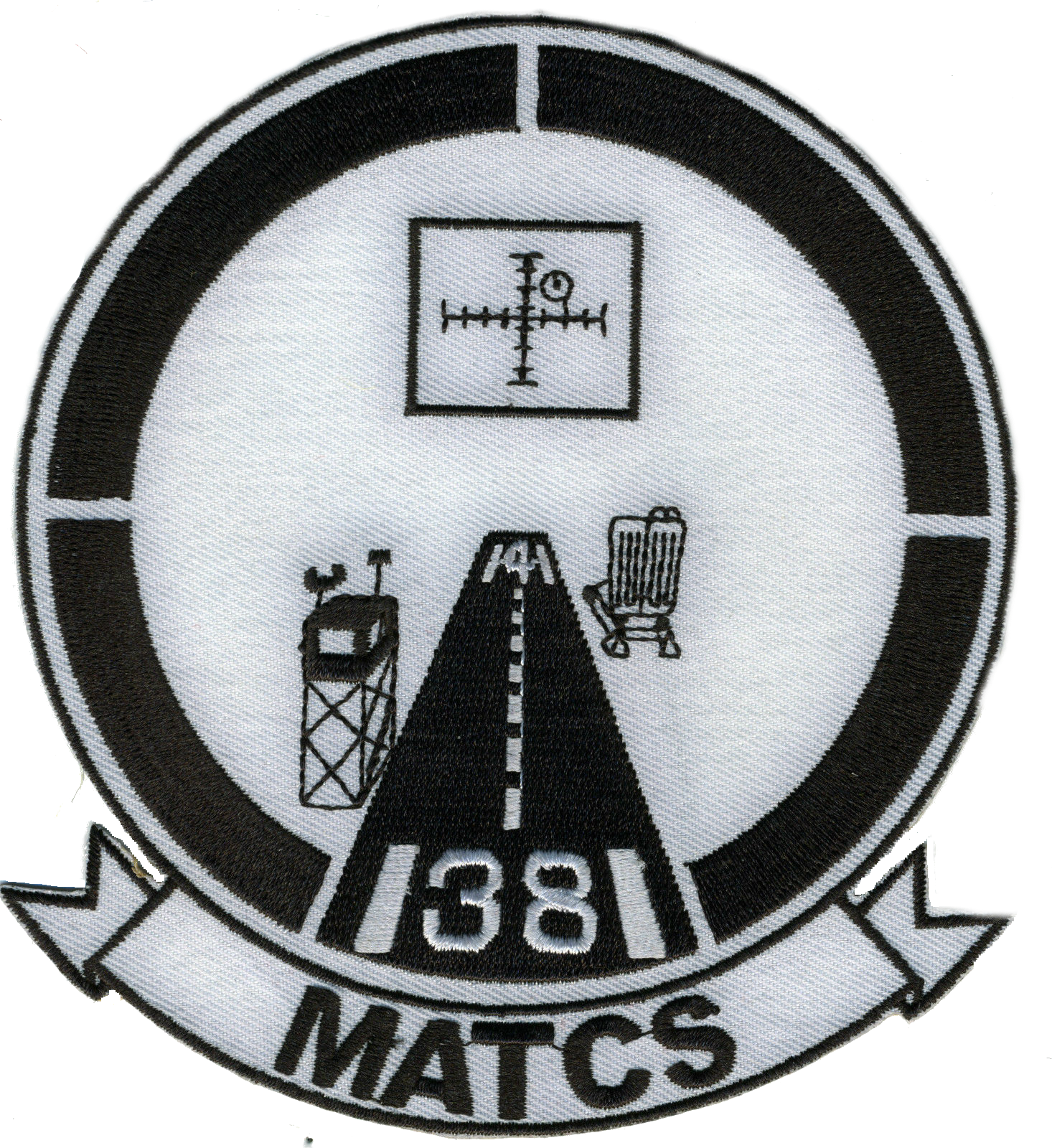
- MATCS-38 insignia
- Active: 27 Apr 1976 – 30 Sep 1994
- Country: United States of America
- Branch: United States Marine Corps
- Type: Air traffic control
- Size: 230 personnel
- Part of: Inactive
- Engagements: The Gulf War; Operation Restore Hope

Commanders
- Current commander: N/A

Marine Air Traffic Control Squadron 38 (MATCS-38) was a United States Marine Corps aviation command and control squadron responsible for providing continuous, all-weather air traffic control services for the 3rd Marine Aircraft Wing throughout the West Coast of the United States. MATCS-38 was formed by consolidating four, regionally aligned Marine Air Traffic Control Units under one flag to better integrate them with the Marine Air Command and Control System. The squadron was headquartered at Marine Corps Air Station Tustin, California and fell under the command of Marine Air Control Group 38. MATCS-38 was decommissioned in September 1994 and its air traffic control function were transferred to Marine Air Control Squadron 1. Since its decommissioning, no other squadron has carried the lineage and honors of MATCS-38.

== Organization ==
- Headquarters – MCAS Tustin, CA
- Detachment A – Twenty-nine Palms, CA
- Detachment B – MCAS Tustin, CA
- Detachment C – MCAS Camp Pendleton, CA
- Detachment D – MCAS El Toro, CA

== Mission ==
Provide all-weather air traffic control service at four expeditionary airfields and eight remote landing sites in support of the Fleet Marine Force. In additional to supporting 3d MAW, the squadron was additionally tasked with providing air traffic control personnel to MCAS El Toro, MCAS Camp Pendleton, and MCAS Yuma in support of the Fleet Assistance Program on a permanent basis. During combat operations, the squadron was designed to be able to provide full IFR services at four main airbases while also providing four mobile teams to support four smaller air sites.

== History ==
=== Commissioning and early years ===
MATCS-38 was commissioned on 26 April 1976, at Marine Corps Air Station Santa Ana, California. The squadron was formed as the Marine Corps unified regional air traffic control services that existed as part of each Marine Air Wing. Up to that point, each Marine Aircraft Group was assigned its own Marine Air Traffic Control Unit (MATCU). MATCUs 65, 67, 74, and 75 were decommissioned the same day that MATCS-38 was stood up.

=== The 1980s ===
In August 1982, MATCS-38 Marines assembled an expeditionary Marine Corps air traffic control tower at Naval Air Facility El Centro for navy controllers to use while their permanent tower was being refurbished from September to November of that year. In March 1983, the squadron was the first Fleet Marine Force unit to receive the new AN/TSQ-120 Air Traffic Control Central. This transportable tower facility replaced the aging AN/TSA-28 and provided 360-degree views of inbound aircraft and visual control over ground vehicles near the runway. During the 1984 Summer Olympics in Los Angeles, California, MATCS-38 established an expeditionary tower and control van at Camarillo Airport to support increased private plane traffic in the Los Angeles area for the event. For the squadron's 1986 Marine Corps Combat Readiness Evaluation it accomplished the largest field deployment of a Marine Corps Air Traffic Control Detachment ever up to that point. While supporting exercises near MCAS Yuma, the squadron established an expeditionary airfield near Holtville, California and controlled airspace that was by designated by Los Angeles Center. In late July 1986, the squadron reorganized into a four detachment unit while also fielding the AN/TPN-22 precision approach radar for ground-controlled approach to replace the AN/TPN-8 which had been in use since the 1960s.

=== The Gulf War, Somalia, and Decommissioning ===
On 19 August 1990, MATCS-38 deployed Detachment B & C to Southwest Asia in support of Operation Desert Shield to provide air traffic control services. Among the airfields supported were Shaikh Isa Air Base in Bahrain and King Abdulaziz Naval Base and Jubail Airport in Saudi Arabia. During the course of the Gulf War MATCS-38 supplied ATC services at six Expeditionary Airfields and another six remote landing sites while directing more than 300,000 air operations without incident. Desert Storm also marked the first time MMT’s (MATC Mobile Teams) were used to support combat operations. Two MMT’s were fielded. One to Kuwait International Airport during Desert Storm and one remained in-country as a contingency after combat operations ceased during the drawdown.

The squadron's Detachment D deployed to Mogadishu, Somalia on 16 December 1992, to provide air traffic control services at Mogadishu International Airport as part of Operation Restore Hope. From 16 December until 8 May 1993, MATCS-38 Detachment D controlled more than 32,000 aircraft operations. 24 Marines from MATCS-38 were among the last 33 Marines to depart Somalia arriving back at MCAS El Toro on 5 May 1993 In 1993 the squadron was awarded the Edward S. Fris Award by the Marine Corp Aviation Association for being the top aviation command and control unit in the Marine Corps. That same year the squadron was also recognized and awarded by the National Air Traffic Controllers Association. This was first time that a military unit had been recognized by the association.

As part of the post-Cold War downsizing of the United States Military, Marine Air Traffic Control Units were designated to be decommissioned with their personnel, equipment, and functions consolidated under local Marine Air Control Squadrons. MATCS-38 was officially decommissioned on 30 September 1994, at MCAS El Toro, California.

== Unit awards ==
A unit citation or commendation is an award bestowed upon an organization for the action cited. Members of the unit who participated in said actions are allowed to wear on their uniforms the awarded unit citation. Marine Air Traffic Control Squadron 38 has been presented with the following awards:

Streamer	Award	Year(s)	Additional Info
A green streamer with red, gold, and blue horizontal stripes along the top and bottom with one silver star in the center	Navy Unit Commendation Streamer	1990–1991	Gulf War
A green streamer with red, gold, and blue horizontal stripes along the top and bottom with one silver star in the center	Meritorious Unit Commendation Streamer	1986–1987	
	National Defense Service Streamer with one Bronze Star	1990–1991	Gulf War

== See also ==
- United States Marine Corps Aviation
- List of United States Marine Corps aviation support units
- History of ground based air defense in the United States Marine Corps
