= Marine Air Control Squadron 23 =

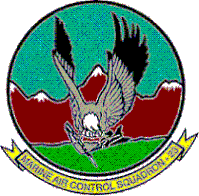
- MACS-23 Insignia
- Active: 16 October 1949 – 16 September 2012
- Country: United States
- Allegiance: United States of America
- Branch: United States Marine Corps
- Type: Aviation Command & Control
- Role: Aerial surveillance & Air traffic control
- Engagements: Operation Desert Storm; Operation Iraqi Freedom

Marine Air Control Squadron 23 (MACS-23) is a former reserve United States Marine Corps aviation command and control squadron. The squadron provided aerial surveillance and air traffic control for the Marine Forces Reserve. They were based Buckley Air Force Base, Aurora, Colorado and fell under Marine Air Control Group 48 and the 4th Marine Aircraft Wing.

== Mission ==
Detect, identify and control the intercept of hostile aircraft and missiles, and provide navigational assistance to friendly aircraft.

== History ==
=== 1949 to 1989 ===
The squadron was activated on 16 October 1949 as Marine Ground Control Intercept Squadron 23 (MGCIS-23). They were part of the Marine Air Reserve Training Command and were based out of Naval Air Station Denver, Colorado. They were re-designated Marine Air Control Squadron 23 on 1 March 1954. In January 1961 they were again re-designated Marine Air Control Squadron, Sub Unit #1. In 1966, they were reassigned to Marine Aircraft Group 42 and a year later to Marine Air Control Group 48.

=== 1990 to present ===
The squadron participated in support of Operation Desert Storm in Southwest Asia from October 1990 through April 1991. On 30 June 1992 they were re-designated Marine Air Control Squadron 24, Detachment A. Two years later they again changed names this time becoming Marine Air Control Squadron 24, Tactical Air Operations Center Detachment. On 8 March 1997 the squadron took its current name.

The squadron also deployed in support of Operation Iraqi Freedom from July 2008 until January 2009 to Al Asad, where they successfully performed the unit's primary mission. The detachment, of less than 100 Marines, received high praise from senior officers at the group level. It was the first and only time the unit had brought its colors into a combat zone as MACS-23.

The squadron was officially deactivated on 16 September 2012.

== Awards ==
- Meritorious Unit Commendation with 2 Bronze Stars

1985–1986
1990–1991
1994–1995

== See also ==
- United States Marine Corps Aviation
- Aviation combat element
- List of United States Marine Corps aviation support squadrons
