= Air Warning Squadron 3 =

- Active: 12 October 1943 – 15 October 1945
- Country: United States
- Allegiance: United States of America
- Branch: United States Marine Corps
- Type: Aviation Command & Control
- Role: Aerial surveillance & early warning
- Size: 267
- Engagements: World War II: Philippines campaign (1944–1945)

Commanders
- Current commander: N/A

Air Warning Squadron 3 (AWS-3) was a United States Marine Corps aviation command and control squadron during World War II. The squadron's primary mission was to provide aerial surveillance and early warning of approaching enemy aircraft during amphibious assaults. The squadron participated in the Philippines campaign (1944–1945) in support of the Eighth Army on Mindanao. AWS-3 was decommissioned shortly after the war in October 1945 at Marine Corps Air Station Miramar, California. To date, no other Marine Corps squadron has carried the lineage and honors of AWS-3 to include the former Marine Air Control Squadron 3 (MACS-3).

== History ==
=== Organization and training ===
Air Warning Squadron 3 was commissioned on 12 October 1943 as part of Marine Air Warning Group 1 at Marine Corps Air Station Cherry Point, North Carolina. The squadron immediately transferred to Marine Corps Auxiliary Airfield Oak Grove to organize crews and conduct additional training on radar. It returned to MCAS Cherry Point at the end of November for follow-on tasking.

On 6 December the squadron loaded personnel and equipment onto trains for movement to the West Coast. AWS-3 arrived at Marine Corps Air Station Miramar, California on 12 December 1943 and fell under the command of Marine Air Warning Group 2. It received additional personnel on the west coast bringing it to its full Table of organization and equipment strength of 14 officers, 258 enlisted Marines and 6 Navy Corpsmen. AWS-3 departed San Diego, CA on 25 February 1944.

=== Espiritu Santo and Bougainville ===
The squadron arrived at Espiritu Santo between 15–22 March 1944. Upon arrival the squadron conducted additional training on radar and communications equipment while also refining ground-controlled interception tactics with numerous Marine Fighter Squadrons based out of the airfield. They also worked with VMF(N)-534 to refine controlling night fighters. AWS-3 ceased operations on Espiritu Santo on 26 August and began preparing for follow on movement.

On 19 November 1944 the squadron arrived on Bougainville to await further assignment. Far East Air Force planners wanted to use Marine Corps aviation to support the Eighth Army's assault on Mindanao in the Southern Philippines. To assist them with this mission the Marines were able to secure the use of Air Warning Squadrons 3 and 4. On 3 March 1945 the squadron embarked on naval shipping bound for the Philippines.

=== Recapture of the Philippines ===
AWS-3 arrived at Mindoro in the Philippines on 20 March 1945. They were initially co-located with Marine Aircraft Group 32 (MAG-32) while awaiting follow on tasking.

On 17 April 1945, AWS-3 was the first Marine unit ashore at Parang and immediately established an SCR-602 radar and reliable communications with the afloat air direction center. The squadron did not meet any resistance during the landing as the Japanese had retreated inland. By 27 April, the squadron was operating six SCR-270 long range early warning radars on Mindanao. The squadron was headquartered at Malabang Airfield with additional radar locations at Cotabato, Fort Pikit, Bubuan Island and Davao City. The squadron worked in support of the 5th and 13th US Air Forces and operated as the 77th Fighter Control Center. The squadron did not detect any enemy aircraft in May 1945 however it did provide valuable service providing safety of flight and homing for distressed and lost aircraft. The squadron secured operations on 1 August and began preparation to reembark on naval shipping.

=== Return home and decommissioning ===
AWS-3 departed the Philippines on 15 August bound for Hawaii. It arrived at Marine Corps Air Station Ewa on 18 August. After turning in all squadron equipment, remaining personnel embarked on the USS Long Island (CVE-1) on 27 September for transportation back to the United States. The squadron arrived at Naval Air Station Alameda on 3 October with follow on transportation to Marine Corps Air Station Miramar. The squadron was decommissioned on 15 October 1945 on the authority of Marine Corps Dispatch 111921 and Marine Fleet Air, West Coast General Order #130-45.

== Notable former members ==
- Macdonald Carey - Film and television actor

== Commanding officers ==
- Capt Harold W Swope - 12 October 1943 – 1 July 1943
- Capt Freeman R. Cass - 2 July 1945 – 27 July 1945
- Capt Edward L. Schappert 28 July 1945 – 10 August 1945
- Capt Edward J Norstrand - 11 August 1945 – 20 August 1945
- Maj John W. Huey Jr. - 21 August 1945 – 11 October 1945
- 1stLt E.C. Wright - 12 October 1945 – 15 October 1945

== Unit awards ==
A unit citation or commendation is an award bestowed upon an organization for the action cited. Members of the unit who participated in said actions are allowed to wear on their uniforms the awarded unit citation. What follows is an incomplete list of the awards AWS-3 has been presented with:

Streamer	Award	Year(s)	Additional Info
	Navy Unit Commendation Streamer	1945	Mindanao
	Asiatic–Pacific Campaign Streamer with one Bronze Star	1945	Philippines campaign (1944–1945)
	World War II Victory Streamer	1943–1945	Pacific War

== See also ==
- Aviation combat element
- United States Marine Corps Aviation
- List of United States Marine Corps aviation support units
