= Marine Air Control Squadron 9 =

Squadron in U.S. Marine Corps

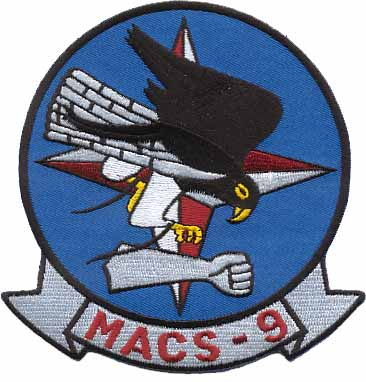
- MACS-9 Insignia
- Active: 31 May 1952 – 30 June 1971
- Country: United States of America
- Branch: United States Marine Corps
- Type: Aviation Command & Control
- Role: Aerial surveillance & ground-controlled interception
- Engagements: Vietnam War

Marine Air Control Squadron 9 (MACS-9) was a United States Marine Corps aviation command and control squadron. The squadron provided aerial surveillance and ground-controlled interception and saw action the Vietnam War. They were last based at Marine Corps Air Station Beaufort, South Carolina and fell under the command of Marine Air Control Group 28 (MACG-28) and the 2nd Marine Aircraft Wing (2nd MAW).

== History ==
=== Early years ===
Marine Ground Control Intercept Squadron 9 (MGCIS-9) was commissioned on May 31, 1952 at Marine Corps Air Station Miami, Florida. During the squadron’s time at MCAS Miami, it participated in numerous training exercises in Puerto Rico and throughout the Caribbean Ocean. The unit acquired its current designation as Marine Air Control Squadron 9 on February 15, 1954. A year and a half later, MACS-9 was ordered to the West Coast and by September 1955, it had settled at Marine Corps Air Station Santa Ana, California. In September 1960, the squadron began the first of three deployments to Japan where it was based out of Marine Corps Air Station Iwakuni for the first two and Naval Air Station Atsugi for the last one. In January 1962, MACS-9 aided VMF-451 with in-flight refueling during the squadron's trans-Pacific flight (the first oceanic crossing attempted and completed by a Marine Corps squadron). In June 1962, a MACS-9 controller directed the first tactical intercept by VMF-314 using their new fighter interceptor, the F4H-1 Phantom.

=== Vietnam Era and beyond ===
MACS-9 received orders to prepare for deployment to Vietnam in the spring of 1965. In early July, the squadron set sail from Yokosuka, Japan aboard the USS Terrell County (LST-1157). It arrived at Chu Lai on July 9, 1965. MACS-9 was not in Vietnam for very long as the squadron was replaced by MACS-7 on September 14, 1965. The squadron moved back to Okinawa with another follow on movement to its new home at MCAS Beaufort, arriving on October 1, 1965. For the next few years MACS-9 maintained a vigorous training program for the detection of hostile aircraft and missiles however the squadron was decommissioned on June 30, 1971.

== Unit awards ==
A unit citation or commendation is an award bestowed upon an organization for the action cited. Members of the unit who participated in said actions are allowed to wear on their uniforms the awarded unit citation. MACS-9 has been presented with the following awards:

Streamer	Award	Year(s)	Additional Info
National Defense Service Streamer with one Bronze Star	1950–1954, 1961–1974	Korean War, Vietnam War	

== See also ==
- United States Marine Corps Aviation
- Aviation combat element
- List of United States Marine Corps aviation support squadrons
