= Marine Air Control Squadron 8 =

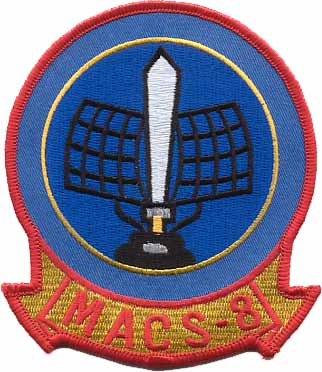
- MACS-8 Insignia
- Active: 1 Sep 1944 – 30 Apr 1947; 23 Apr 1952 – 15 Jun 1971
- Country: United States of America
- Branch: United States Marine Corps
- Type: Aviation Command & Control
- Role: Aerial surveillance & ground-controlled interception

Marine Air Control Squadron 8 (MACS-8) was a United States Marine Corps aviation command and control squadron. The squadron provided aerial surveillance and ground-controlled interception (GCI). Originally formed in World War II as Air Warning Squadron 18 (AWS-18), the squadron served as a training and replacement unit until it was decommissioned in April 1947 as part of the post war drawdown of forces. Reactivated in 1952 during the Korean War the squadron took part in numerous Far East deployments during the 1960s. Transferred to Japan in 1969, the squadron was decommissioned in 1971 as the last Marine Corps units were departing South Vietnam. They were last based at Marine Corps Air Station Futenma, Okinawa, Japan and fell under the command of Marine Air Control Group 18 (MACG-18) and the 1st Marine Aircraft Wing (1st MAW).

== History ==
=== World War II ===
Air Warning Squadron 18 (AWS-18) was commissioned on 1 September 1944 at Marine Corps Air Station Cherry Point, North Carolina. Three weeks later the majority of the squadron departed for Marine Corps Auxiliary Landing Field Bogue, NC except for a small detachment that was sent to Marine Corps Auxiliary Airfield Atlantic, NC. During this time the squadron trained in day and night radar operations and fighter control. By December 1944, AWS-18 was serving as a training and replacement squadron underneath Marine Air Warning Group 1. AWS-18 returned to MCAS Cherry Point in August 1945. On 1 August 1946, the squadron was re-designated Marine Ground Control Intercept Squadron 8. The squadron was decommissioned on 30 April 1947 as part of the larger post-war drawdown of the Marine Corps.

=== 1950s ===
The squadron was reactivated on 23 April 1952 as Marine Ground Control Intercept Squadron 8 (MGCIS-8) at Marine Corps Air Station Miami, Florida. During the squadron's time at MCAS Miami it participated in numerous training exercises in Puerto Rico and elsewhere in the Caribbean Ocean area. The unit acquired its current designation as MACS-8 on 15 February 1954.

In October 1957, MACS-8 departed MCAS Miami for Page Field at Marine Corps Recruit Depot Parris Island, South Carolina.

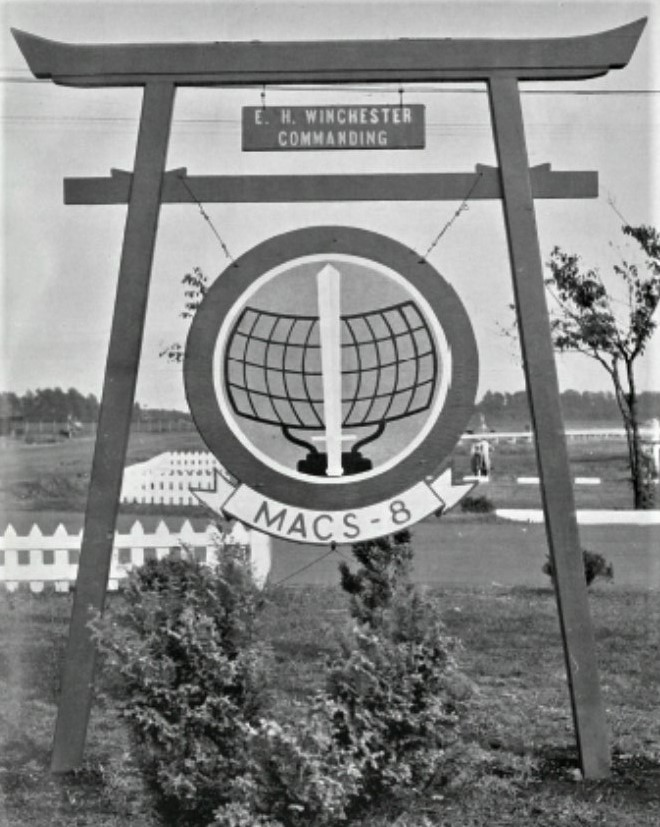
MACS-8 Torii while deployed to NAS Atsugi in early 1961

=== 1960s and decommissioning ===
In February 1960 MACS-8 departed for Naval Air Station Cubi Point, Philippines relieving Marine Air Control Squadron 1 (MACS-1) as the deployed air control squadron in the Far East. In May 1960 the squadron moved again to Naval Air Station Atsugi in mainland Japan. During the course of their fifteen-month deployment to the Far East, MACS-8 controllers conducted more than 10,000 ground control intercept controls. In May 1962, the squadron returned to the United States and took over operations at Marine Corps Air Station New River, NC.

MACS-8 remained at MCAS New River until May 1964 when they once again deployed to NAS Atsugi to work with Marine Corps fighter squadrons of Marine Aircraft Group 11 (MAG-11). In January 1965, the squadron moved south to a hilltop outside Camp Schwab in Okinawa. In May 1965 they returned to MCAS Cherry Point and remained there until October 1966. MACS-8 left MCAS Cherry Point and joined Marine Aircraft Group 15 (MAG-15) at Marine Corps Air Station Iwakuni on 27 February 1968.

When Marine Air Control Squadron 4 (MACS-4) returned to MCAS Futenma from South Vietnam in 1971, they fell in on MACS-8's equipment and MACS-8 was decommissioned on 15 Jun 1971.

== Unit awards ==
A unit citation or commendation is an award bestowed upon an organization for the action cited. Members of the unit who participated in said actions are allowed to wear on their uniforms the awarded unit citation. MACS-8 has been presented with the following awards:

Streamer	Award	Year(s)	Additional Info
	National Defense Service Streamer with one Bronze Star	1952–1954, 1961–1971	Korean War, Vietnam War

== See also ==
- Aviation combat element
- United States Marine Corps Aviation
- List of United States Marine Corps aviation support squadrons
