= 4th Low Altitude Air Defense Battalion =

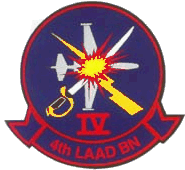
- 4th LAAD Insignia
- Active: 1 October 1972 – March 2005
- Country: United States of America
- Branch: United States Marine Corps
- Role: Air defense
- Part of: Inactive
- Garrison/HQ: Pasadena, California
- Nickname(s): 4th LAAD
- Motto(s): "Death From Below"
- Engagements: Operation Desert Storm; Operation Iraqi Freedom

4th Low Altitude Air Defense Battalion (4th LAAD) was a reserve air defense unit of the United States Marine Corps. They were part of Marine Air Control Group 48 (MACG-48) and the 4th Marine Aircraft Wing (4th MAW) and were based out in Pasadena, California.

== Mission ==
Provide close-in air defense protection for Marine Air Ground Task Force assets, key installations and vital area within the area of operations including protection of units operating in forward combat areas or engaged in special independent operations.

== History ==
The 4th Low Altitude Air Defense Battalion traces its origin back to 1 October 1972, when the 4th Forward Area Air Defense (FAAD) Battery was activated as a combat support unit under the 4th Marine Aircraft Wing. From 1972 to 1988, 4th FAAD Battery consisted of (4) Firing Platoons and a Headquarters and Service platoon. FAAD teams employed the Red Eye shoulder-launched surface-to-air missile and used the M1A1 Jeep for missile transport and tactical mobility. In 1988, 4th FAAD Battery transitioned from the Red Eye and Jeep to the Stinger surface-to-air missile and the Humvee.

On 1 July 1989, 4th FAAD Battery was re-designated as the 4th Low Altitude Air Defense Battalion and was assigned to Marine Air Control Group 48, 4th Marine Aircraft Wing. The re-designation increased the size of the unit from four platoons to a Battalion headquarters, one Firing Battery and a Headquarters and Service Battery. At that time, 4th FAAD Detachment Alpha in Marietta, Georgia, was also re-designated as 4th LAAD Battalion, Detachment Alpha and increased in size from three platoons to a Firing Battery and a Headquarters and Service Detachment.

Several significant events have occurred in the unit following the re-designation. In November 1990, a platoon of 45 Stinger gunners and communication operators deployed to Southwest Asia in support of Operation Desert Shield and Operation Desert Storm. The platoon was assigned to the 5th Marine Expeditionary Brigade to augment the active duty LAAD forces. In 1995, the Avenger weapon system was fielded to the unit. The avenger is a HMMWV-based Stinger platform that provides enhanced night engagement capabilities and the ability to shoot on the move.

In the summer of 2004 the 4th LAAD Battalion was activated as a provisional security unit in support of Operation Iraqi Freedom. For the first time, both elements of the battalion were combined into a single unit, and were augmented with an active duty unit (Battery K, 3rd Battalion, 10th Marines) and fellow reserve unit (Battery P, 5th Battalion 14th Marines) to form a provisional security battalion. Deployed to Al Asad Airbase, located in Iraq's Al Anbar province, the battalion's mission was ensuring the security of the base through checkpoints, towers, and various internal and external patrolling. The battalion was tasked with other roles such as security escorts for humanitarian missions and reconstruction efforts in the area and providing security for various visiting officials, including the Secretary of Defense, the Chairman of the Joint Chiefs of Staff and the Commandant of the Marine Corps. 4th LAAD Battalion also participated in support of Iraq's January 2005 legislative elections. For their efforts in Iraq, the battalion received a Navy Unit Commendation.

After redeployment to the United States in March 2005, 4th LAAD Battalion was soon disbanded.

== See also ==
- Organization of the United States Marine Corps
- List of United States Marine Corps aviation support squadrons
