= Marine Tactical Air Command Squadron 38 =

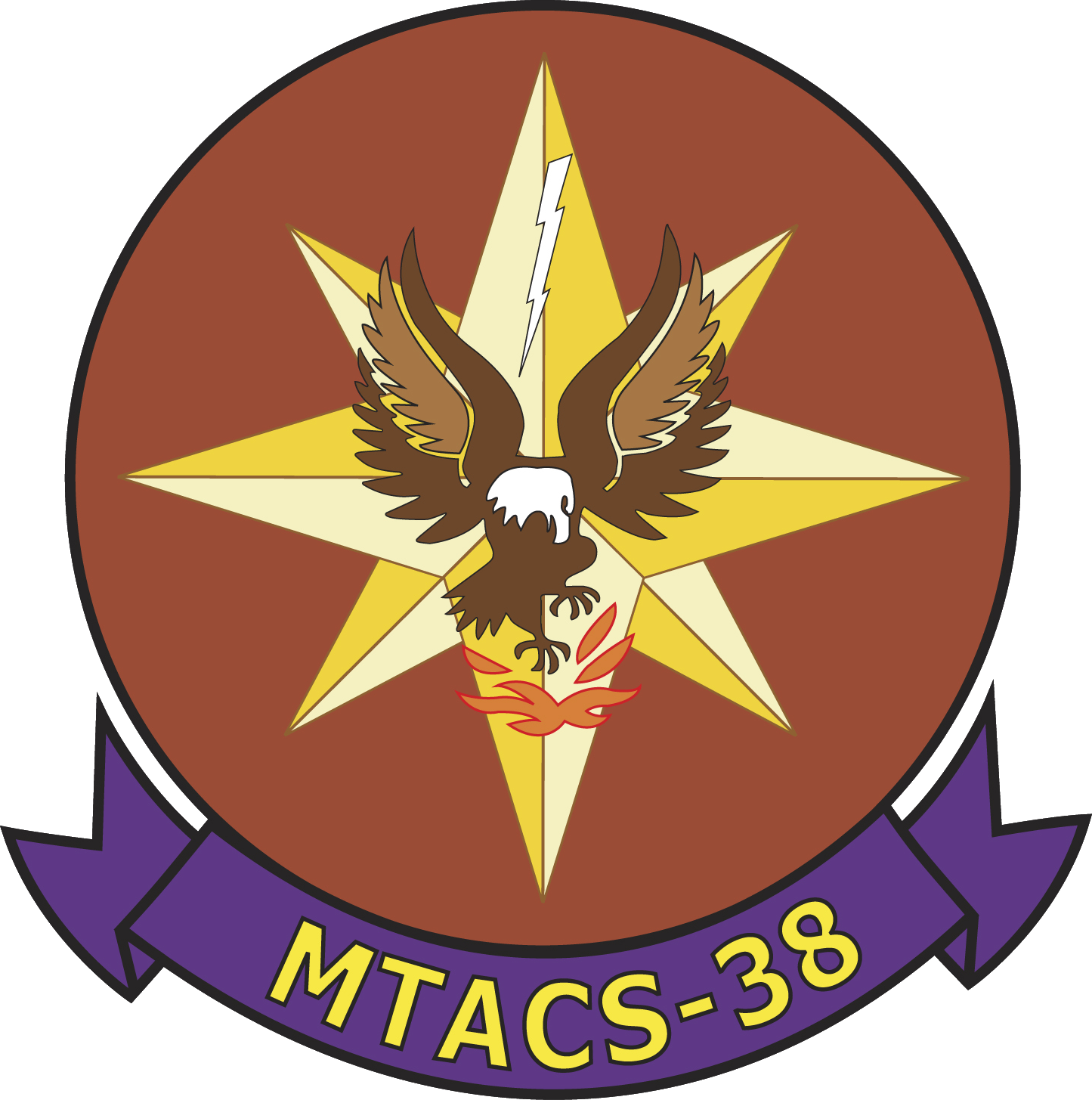
- MTACS-38
- Active: 1 September 1967 – 19 November 2021
- Country: United States of America
- Branch: United States Marine Corps
- Type: Aviation Command and Control
- Role: Provide TACC for the ACE Commander
- Part of: Marine Air Control Group 38; 3rd Marine Aircraft Wing
- Garrison/HQ: Marine Corps Air Station Miramar
- Engagements: Operation Desert Storm; Operation Restore Hope; Operation Iraqi Freedom * 2003 invasion of Iraq; Operation Enduring Freedom

Marine Tactical Air Command Squadron 38 (MTACS-38) was a United States Marine Corps aviation command and control unit that provided the Tactical Air Command Center (TACC) for the 3rd Marine Aircraft Wing (3rd MAW). The TACC is the senior agency in the Marine Air Command and Control System (MACCS) and serves as the operational command post for the commander of the aviation combat element and their staff. The squadron was based at Marine Corps Air Station Miramar, California and fell under the command of Marine Air Control Group 38 and the 3rd Marine Aircraft Wing.

== Mission ==
To function as the senior Marine Air-Ground Task Force air command and control agency integrating the six functions of Marine aviation within the 3rd Marine Aircraft Wing and providing the facilities, equipment and personnel for the aviation combat element commander and battle staff to plan, supervise, coordinate and execute air operations.

== History ==
=== Early years ===
Headquarters and Headquarters Squadron 38 was commissioned on 1 September 1967 at Marine Corps Air Station El Toro, California. The squadron deployed to Saudi Arabia in August 1990 in support of Operation Desert Shield which would transition to Operation Desert Storm in January 1991. The squadron returned to MCAS El Toro in March 1991. Elements of the squadron deployed to Somalia in December 1992 to support Operation Restore Hope. They remained there until February 1993. On 1 May 1993 the squadron was re-designated as ‘'Marine Tactical Air Command Squadron 38'’.

=== Operation Iraqi Freedom ===
In early 2003, MTACS-38 deployed to Kuwait where they established the TACC at Ahmad al-Jaber Air Base. From there they supported the 2003 invasion of Iraq by managing the assets of the 3rd Marine Aircraft Wing which was in support of I Marine Expeditionary Force. MTACS-38 subsequently deployed for tours up to a year long in Iraq in 2004, 2006, and 2008 to Al Asad Air Base in Al Anbar Province .

=== Operation Enduring Freedom ===
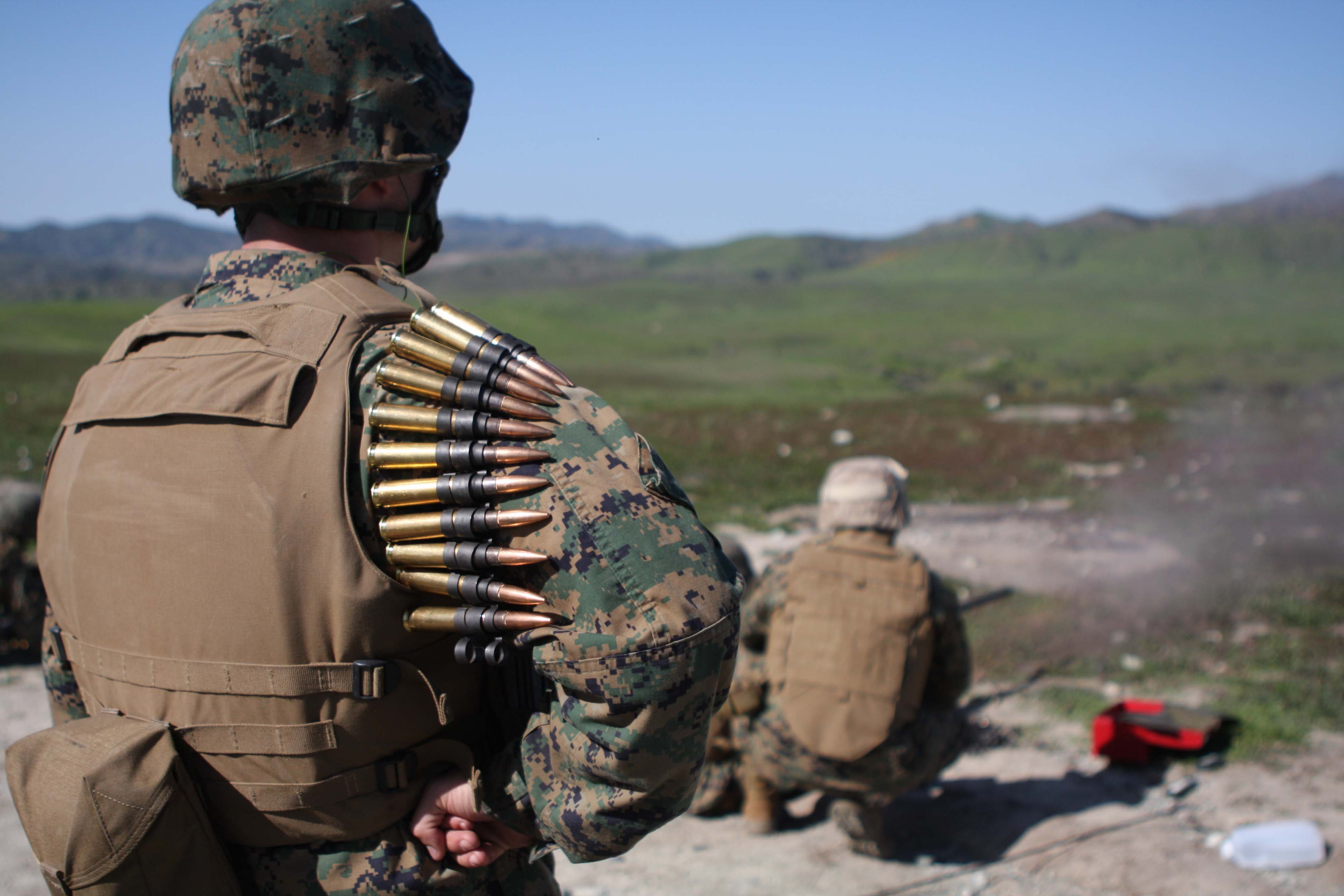
Lance Cpl. Steven R. Weinberg, an operations clerk with Marine Tactical Air Command Squadron 38 waits his turn to fire a M240B machine gun during the squadron's pre-deploymaent exercise, 2010, 17 Feb.. More than 100 Marines will deploy for the squadron throughout the year in support of Operation Enduring Freedom.

In April 2010, MTACS-38 deployed to Afghanistan for the first time in support of Operation Enduring Freedom. They supported combat operations in support of I MEF for a year while based at Camp Leatherneck. They were relieved by MTACS-28 in March 2011.

In February 2012, MTACS-38 once again deployed to Camp Leatherneck, Afghanistan in support of Operation Enduring Freedom. They were relieved by MTACS-28 in February 2013.

In January 2014, MTACS-38 deployed for the third and final time to Camp Leatherneck, Afghanistan in support of Operation Enduring Freedom. During that time the Marines of MTACS-38 assisted with the teardown in preparation for withdrawal. MTACS-38 left Afghanistan for the last time in November 2014.

=== Decommissioning ===
As part of the Commandant of the Marine Corps' Force Design 2030 initiative, MTACS-38 was decommissioned on 19 November 2021 at a ceremony at MCAS Miramar, CA. The squadron's mission of providing the Tactical Air Command Center now resides with the MACG-38 headquarters.

== See also ==
- United States Marine Corps Aviation
- Organization of the United States Marine Corps
- List of United States Marine Corps aviation support squadrons
