= 2nd Light Antiaircraft Missile Battalion =

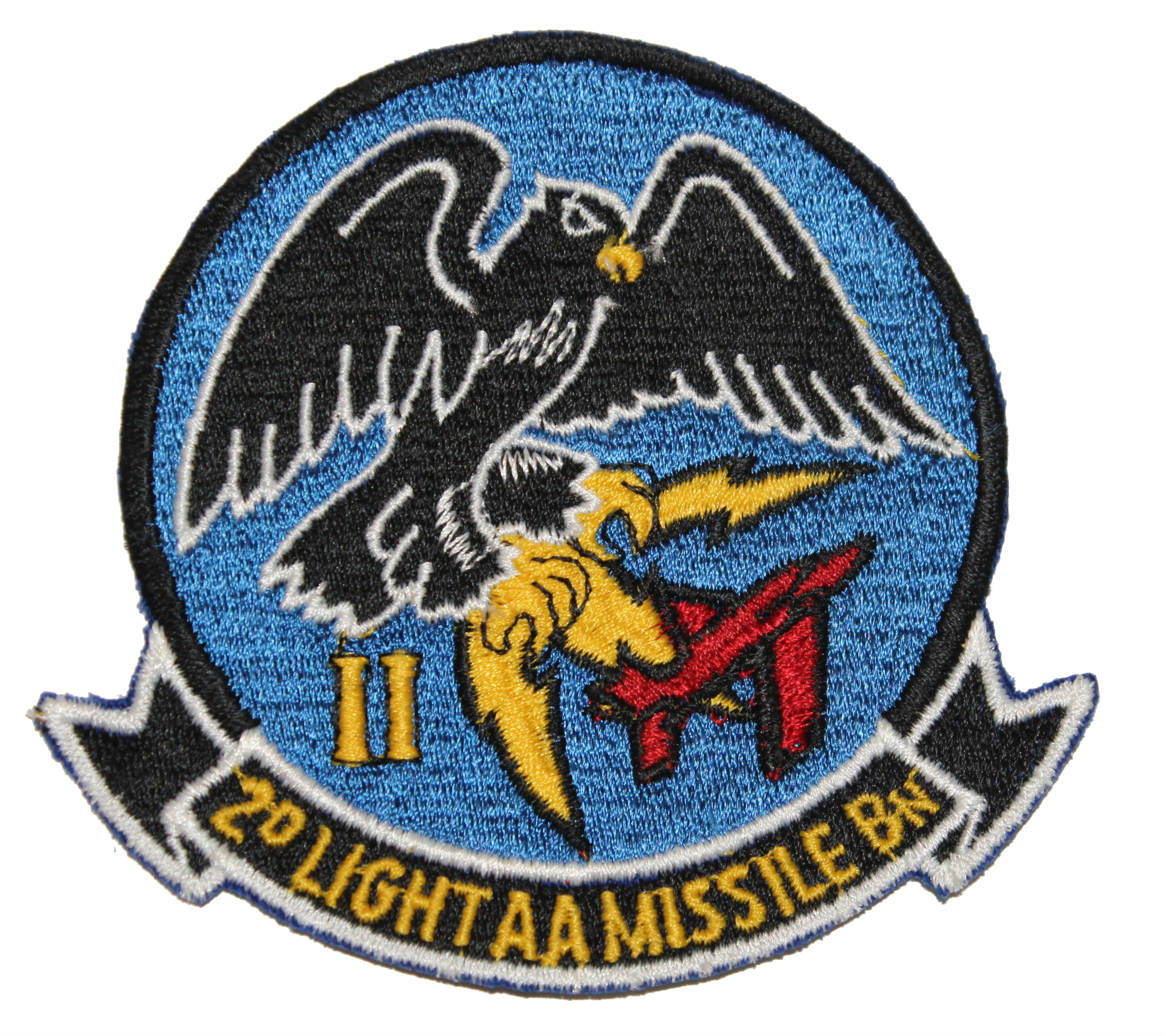
- 2nd LAAM Battalion insignia
- Active: 1 Aug 1960 – 1 Sep 1994
- Country: United States of America
- Branch: United States Marine Corps
- Type: Air Defense
- Part of: Inactive
- Nickname(s): Blackhawks
- Engagements: Vietnam War; Gulf War

Commanders
- Current commander: N/A

2nd Light Antiaircraft Missile Battalion (2d LAAM Bn) was a United States Marine Corps air defense unit equipped with the medium range surface-to-air MIM-23 HAWK Missile System. 2nd LAAM was based at Chu Lai during the Vietnam War and was responsible for providing air defense for the Marine Corps in the northern part of the I Corps sector. After Vietnam, the battalion was based at Marine Corps Air Station Yuma, Arizona and fell under the command of Marine Air Control Group 38 (MACG-38) and the 3rd Marine Aircraft Wing (3rd MAW). 2nd LAAM Battalion's last combat tour saw it providing air defense for the Marine Corps area of operations during Operation Desert Shield/Desert Storm. 2nd LAAM Battalion was deactivated on 1 September 1994 as part of the post-Cold War draw down of forces and because the Marine Corps had made the decision to divest itself of its medium-range air defense. The battalions personnel and equipment were transferred to 1st Light Antiaircraft Missile Battalion (1st LAAM).

== History ==
The 2nd Light Antiaircraft Missile Battalion was activated at Marine Corps Training Center 29 Palms, California on 1 August 1960. At the time of activation the battalion consisted of just a Headquarters and Service Battery as the personnel that would form the firing batteries were still undergoing conversion training on the HAWK missile at Fort Bliss, Texas. At the completion of their training in January 1961 the Marines at Fort Bliss joined the battalion at MCB 29 Palms and helped fill out the four firing batteries that were formed between 5–8 February 1961. On 14 September 1960, "D" Battery, 2nd LAAM became the first HAWK battery to be tactically airlifted from its home installation to its firing point. Three Marine Corps Lockheed Martin KC-130s made a total of 13 trips over 10 hours to complete the movement from 29 Palms out to San Clemente Island. The battalion was reassigned from Force Troops to Air, Fleet Marine FOrce, Pacific on 10 May 1962.

In September 1965 the battalion deployed to Chu Lai, Republic of Vietnam. 2nd LAAM remained in Vietnam until October 1968 when it returned to MCB 29 Palms. Upon its return, the battalion fell under the command of Marine Air Control Group 38 and the 3rd Marine Aircraft Wing. On 1 April 1971 the battalion relocated to Marine Corps Air Station Yuma, Arizona.

=== Gulf War ===
In August 1990, 2nd LAAM Battalion flew in four firing units in two missile batteries to cover the large Marine Corps Area of Operations during Operation Desert Shield. Initially Battery A/2, was established in firing positions north of Shaikh Isa Air Base in Bahrain while Battery B/2 established a firing unit north of King Abdul Aziz Naval Base near Jubail, Saudi Arabia. The command and control of these HAWK batteries ran through the Tactical Air Operations Center run by Marine Air Control Squadron 1 (MACS-1) which was integrated into the Saudi Arabian Royal Air Force Easter Sector Command Center in Dhahran. In early September 1990, these Marine Corps HAWK units were the only Medium Altitude Air Defense in Saudi Arabia. As the buildup continued, 2nd LAAM took part in force on force engagements against friendly aircraft in Saudi Arabia.

== Unit awards ==
A unit citation or commendation is an award bestowed upon an organization for the action cited. Members of the unit who participated in said actions are allowed to wear on their uniforms the awarded unit citation. The 2nd Light Antiaircraft Missile Battalion has been presented with the following awards:

Streamer	Award	Year(s)	Additional Info
	Presidential Unit Citation Streamer	1965-67	Vietnam
	National Defense Service Streamer with one Bronze Star	1961–1974, 1990–1995	Vietnam War, Gulf War
	Southwest Asia Service Streamer with two Bronze Stars	September 1990 – February 1991	Desert Shield, Desert Storm
	Vietnam Service Streamer with one Silver and two Bronze Star		
	Vietnam Gallantry Cross with Palm Streamer		

== See also ==
- United States Marine Corps Aviation
- List of United States Marine Corps aviation support units
- History of ground based air defense in the United States Marine Corps
