= Marine Corps Outlying Field Oak Grove =

- IATA: none; ICAO: none; FAA LID: 13NC

Summary
- Airport type: Military
- Owner: U.S. Navy
- Location: Pollocksville, North Carolina
- Built: 1942
- Elevation AMSL: 25 ft / 8 m
- Coordinates: 35°1′28.57″N 77°15′19.48″W
- Interactive map of Marine Corps Outlying Field Oak Grove

Runways
Direction	Length		Surface
Direction	ft	m	Surface
5/23	4,200	1,280	Asphalt
9/27	4,100	1,250	Asphalt
1/19	4,000	1,219	Asphalt

Marine Corps Outlying Field Oak Grove is an auxiliary airport of the United States Marine Corps located near Pollocksville, North Carolina. It was opened on 4 May 1943 during World War II as an outlying field of Marine Corps Air Station Cherry Point. During the war numerous fighter squadrons to include VMF-321 and VMF-323 trained at Oak Grove prior to deploying. After the war, Oak Grove and Marine Corps Auxiliary Airfield Kinston were the MCAS Cherry Point outlying fields to remain open. On 15 June 1947 Oak Grove became a permanent OLF of Cherry Point and today is used for helicopter, tilt-rotor and AV-8B Harrier training.

== Bibliography ==
- Shettle, M. L. (2001). United States Marine Corps Air Stations of World War II. Bowersville, Georgia: Schaertel Publishing Co. ISBN 0-9643388-2-3.
