= Marine Air Command and Control System =

Agencies of the US Marine Corps

The Marine Air Command and Control System (MACCS) is the aviation command and control agencies of the United States Marine Corps that provide the Aviation Combat Element (ACE) commander with the means to monitor, supervise, and influence aviation operations in support of the Marine Air-Ground Task Force. The command and control agencies of the MACCS are provided by the squadrons and battalions of the Marine Air Control Groups that are present within each Marine Air Wing. The capabilities resident within the MACCS allow the MAGTF commander to safely conduct aviation operations, facilitate timely maneuver and prosecution of fires and ultimately retain full control of their entire area of operations. MACCS agencies are also responsible for coordinating Marine Corps aviation operations with joint, multinational and civil aviation.

The three principal objectives of the MACCS are to enhance unity of effort, integrate the elements of the command and control system, and disseminate common situational awareness. The MACCS focuses the other five functions of Marine Aviation (Antiair Warfare, Offensive Air Support, Assault Support, Electronic Warfare and Air Reconnaissance) and gives the ACE commander the ability to real-time allocate resources and control aircraft in support of the MAGTF commander.

== Control of aircraft and missiles ==
Control of aircraft and missiles is used to integrate the other five functions by providing the means for the Marine Air-Ground Task Force commander to exercise command and control authority over Marine Aviation assets. It involves the coordinated employment of facilities, equipment, communications, procedures, and personnel to plan, direct, and control the aviation combat element's efforts.

== Current agencies and missions ==
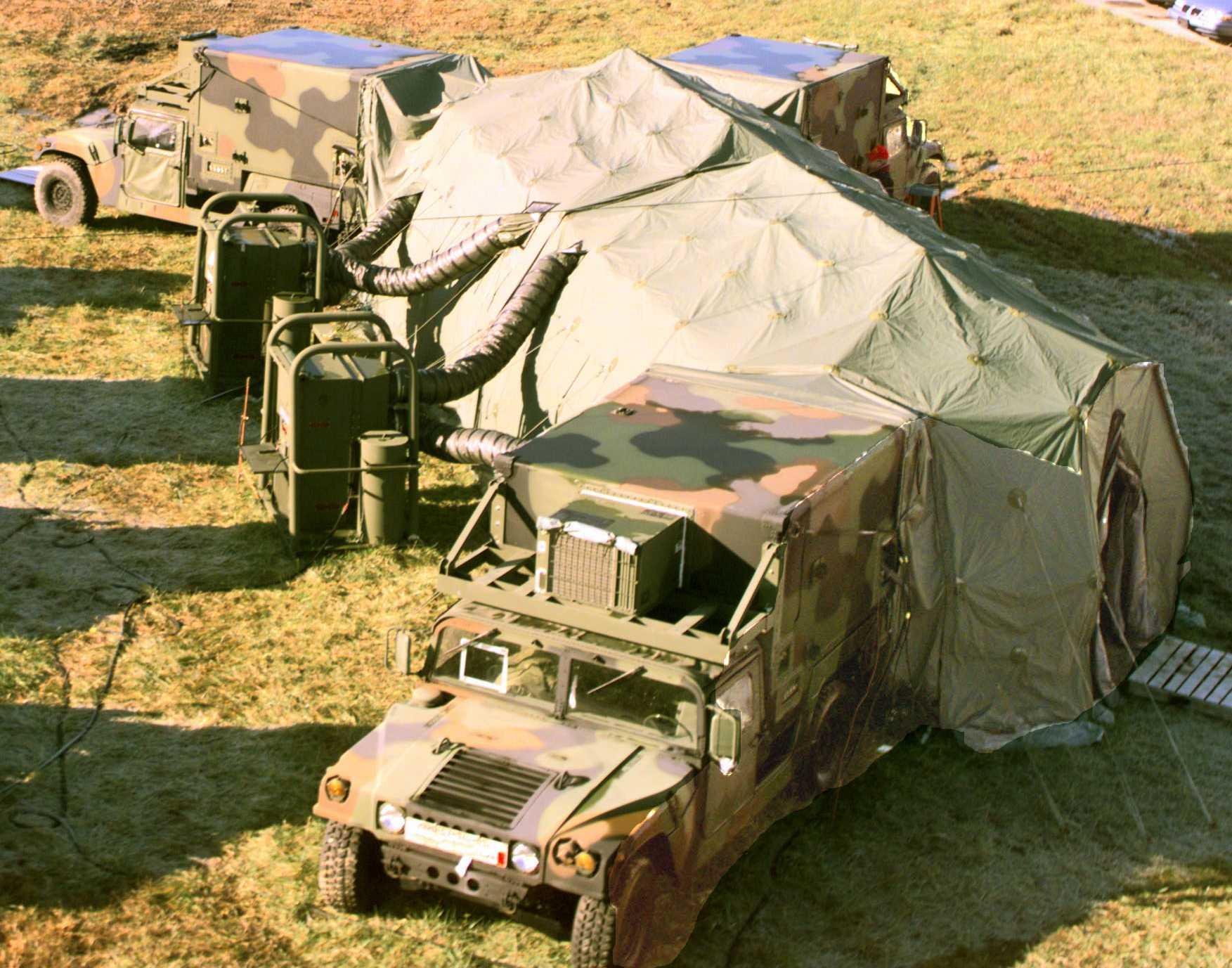
Overhead shot of an older DASC setup.

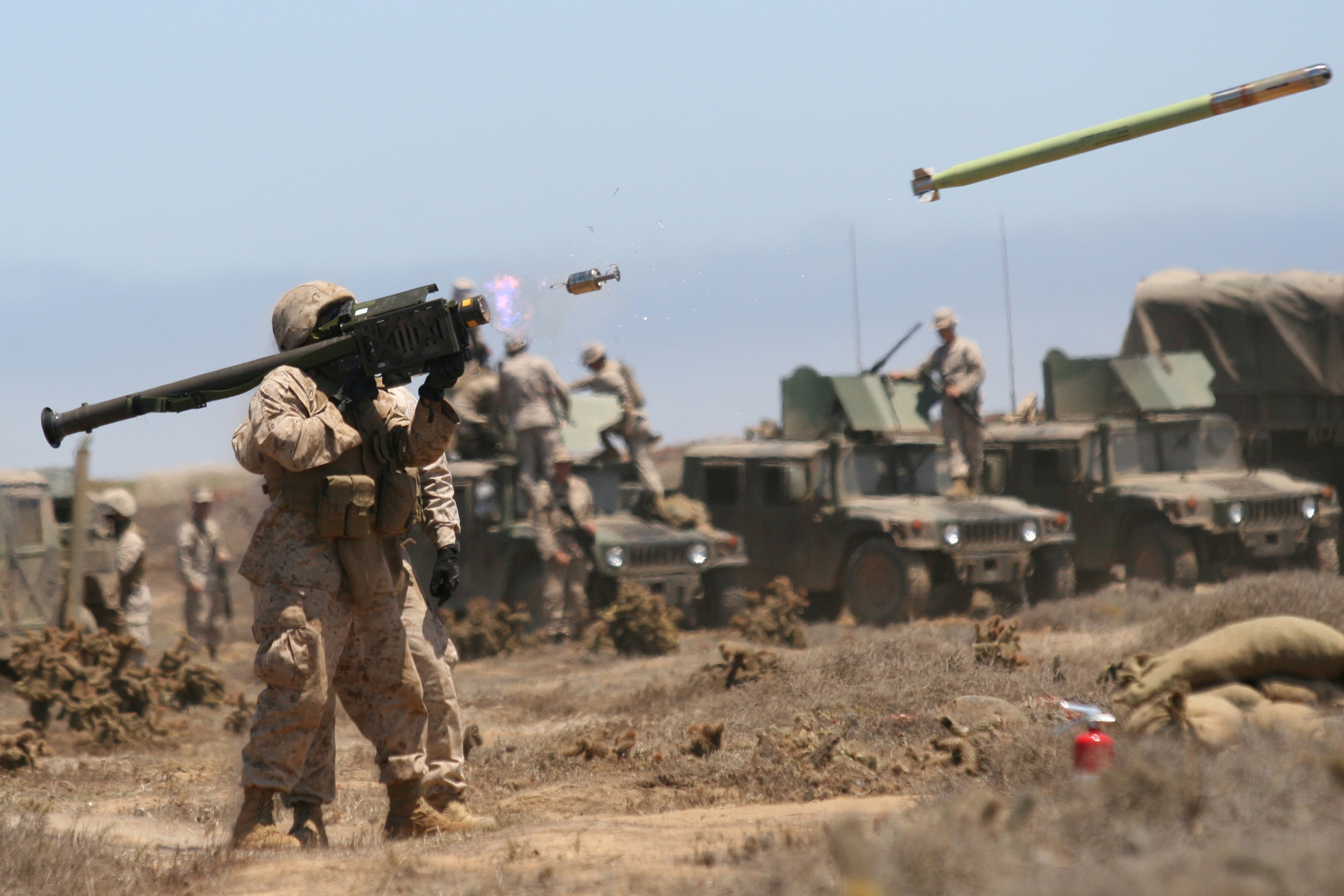
A U.S. Marine fires an FIM-92A Stinger missile during a July 2009 training exercise in California.

- Air Traffic Control (ATC) - provides continuous all-weather air traffic control services to an independent and geographically separated main air base or air facility. Each active duty Marine Air Control Squadron has three air traffic control detachments.
- Direct Air Support Center (DASC) - controls and coordinates tactical aircraft operations directly supporting ground forces. It is responsible for the processing of immediate requests (e.g. Close Air Support, CASEVAC, and Assault Support), integrating and deconflicting indirect fire support (e.g., artillery and mortars) with aviation assets, manage terminal control assets, and procedurally controlling aircraft. The DASC's parent unit is the Marine Air Support Squadron (MASS).
- Tactical Air Command Center (TACC) - agency from which air operations and air defense warning functions are directed. It is the senior agency of the MACCS and also serves as the operational command post of the ACE commander. The TACC's parent unit used to be the Marine Tactical Air Command Squadron which wa responsible for setting up the physical infrastructure of the TACC and providing command and control Marines to staff the current operations cell. The active duty MTACS were decommissioned during 2021-2022 with the responsibility for the TACC moving to the Marine Air Control Group headquarters. Additional personnel for the TACC are staffed from the Marine Wing Headquarters Squadron and augments from across the Wing as required.
- Tactical Air Operations Center (TAOC) - agency responsible for real time surveillance, direction, positive control, and navigational assistance for friendly aircraft. The TAOC performs real-time direction and control of all anti-air warfare operations, to include crewed interceptors and surface-to-air weapons. The TAOC's parent unit is the Marine Air Control Squadron (MACS).
- Ground Based Air Defense - The LAAD Battalions provide close-in, low altitude, surface-to-air weapons fires in defense of Marine Air-Ground Task Force (MAGTF) assets. These battalions defend forward combat areas, maneuver forces, vital areas, installations and/or units engaged in special/independent operations. They also provide a task organized, ground security force in defense of MAGTF air sites when not engaged in air defense operations.

== Current MACCS organization ==
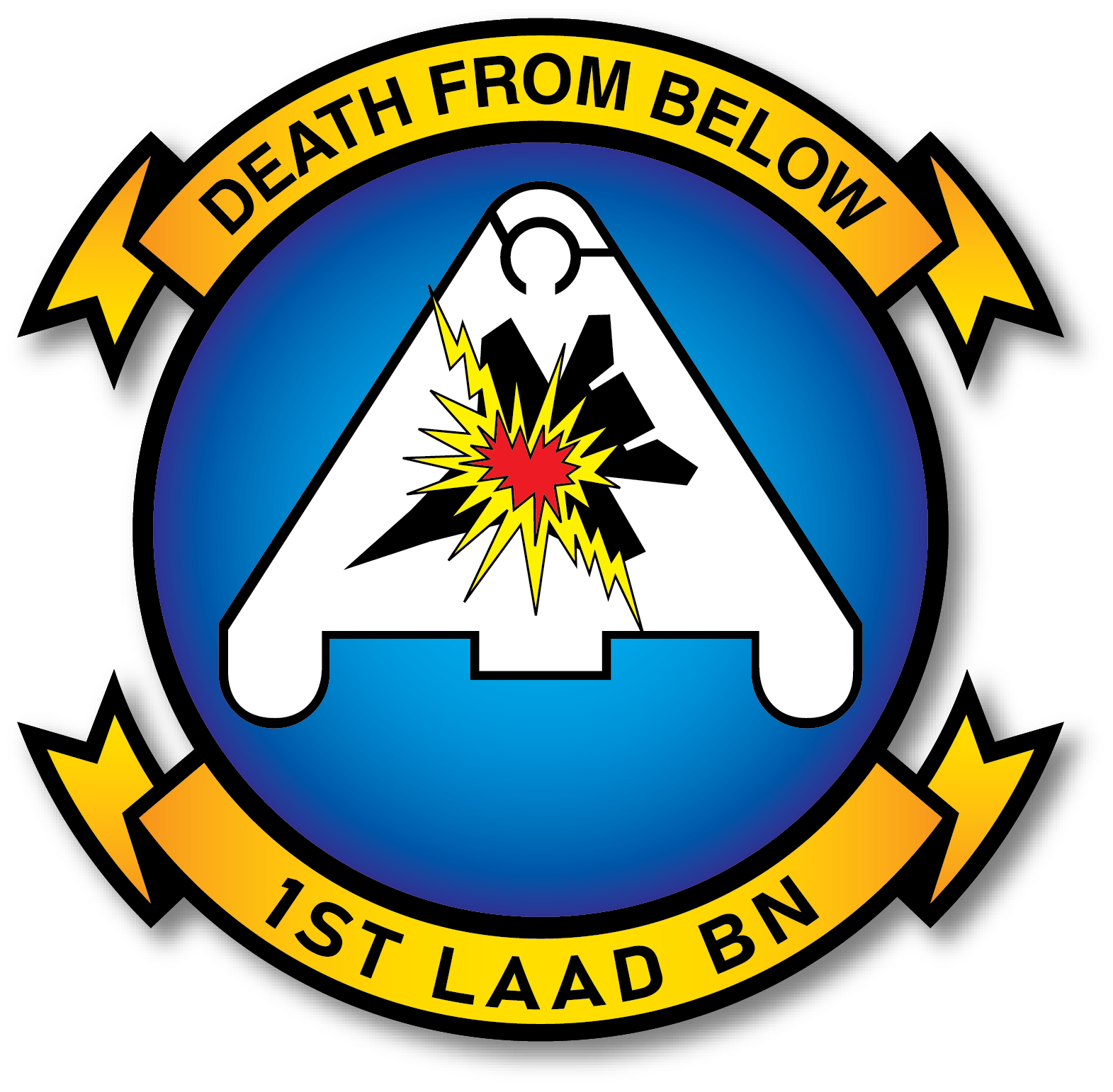
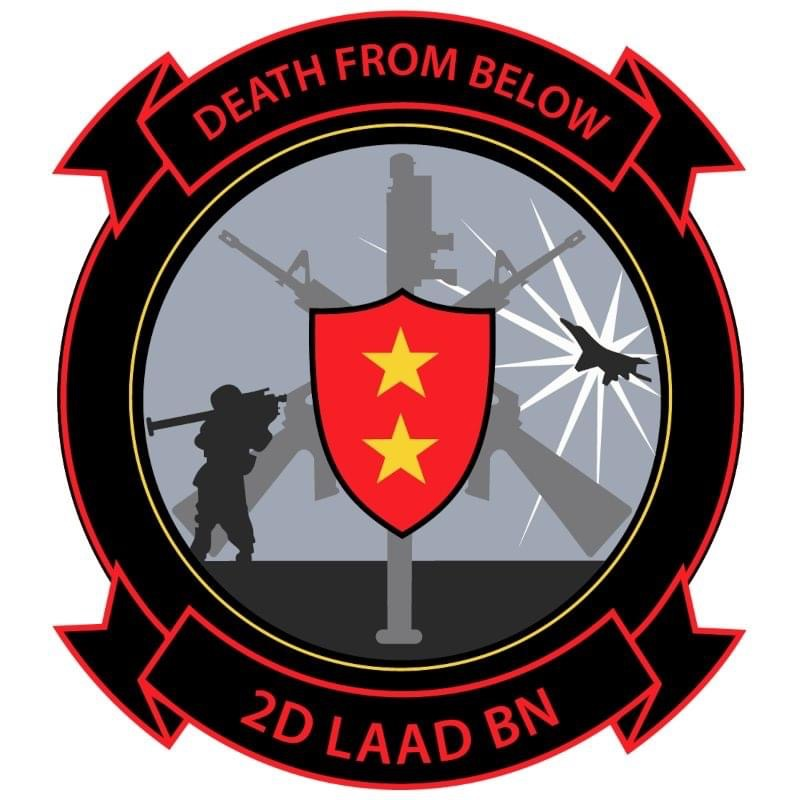
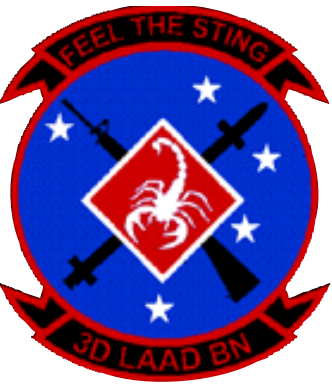
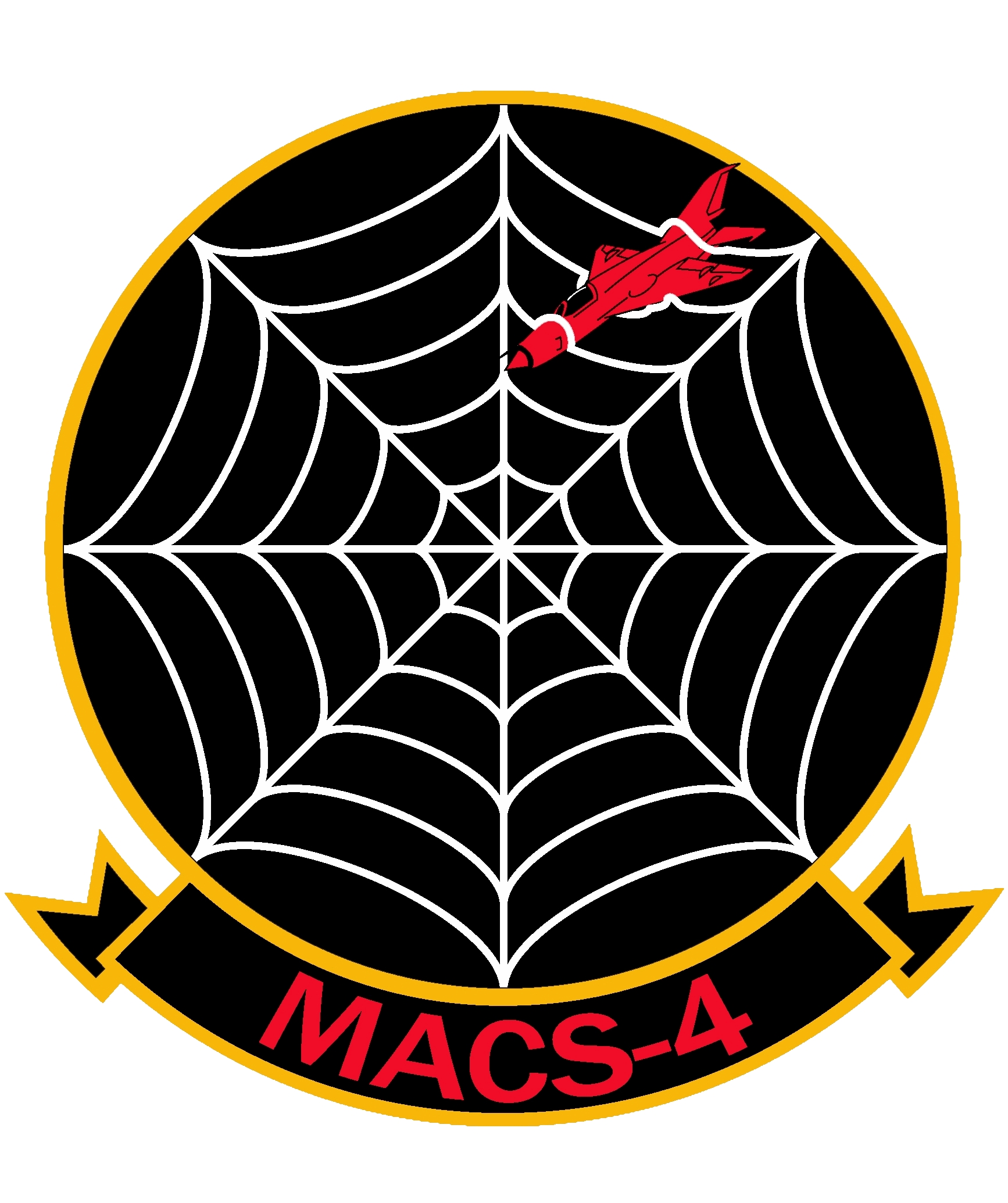
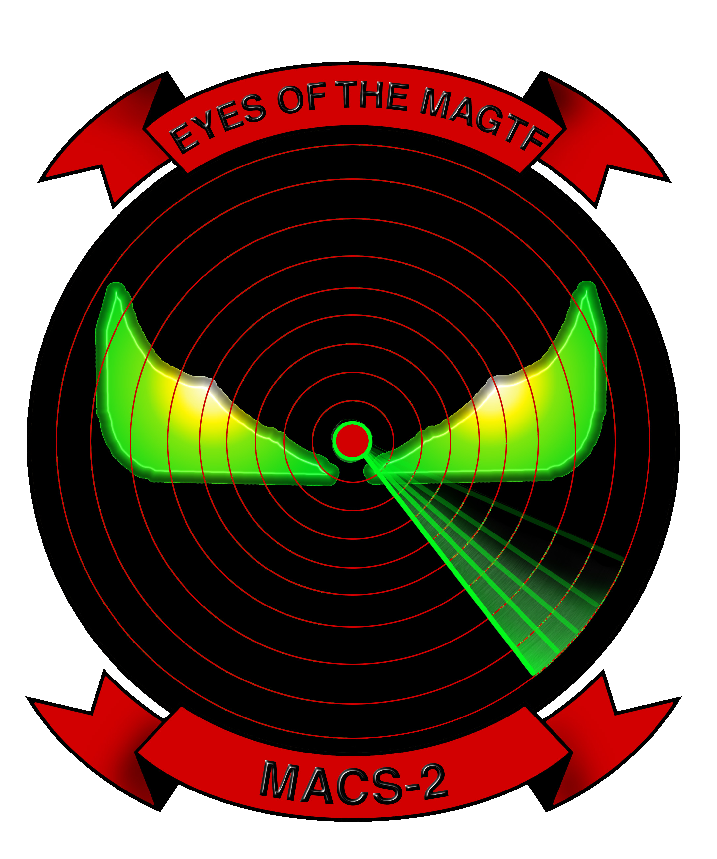
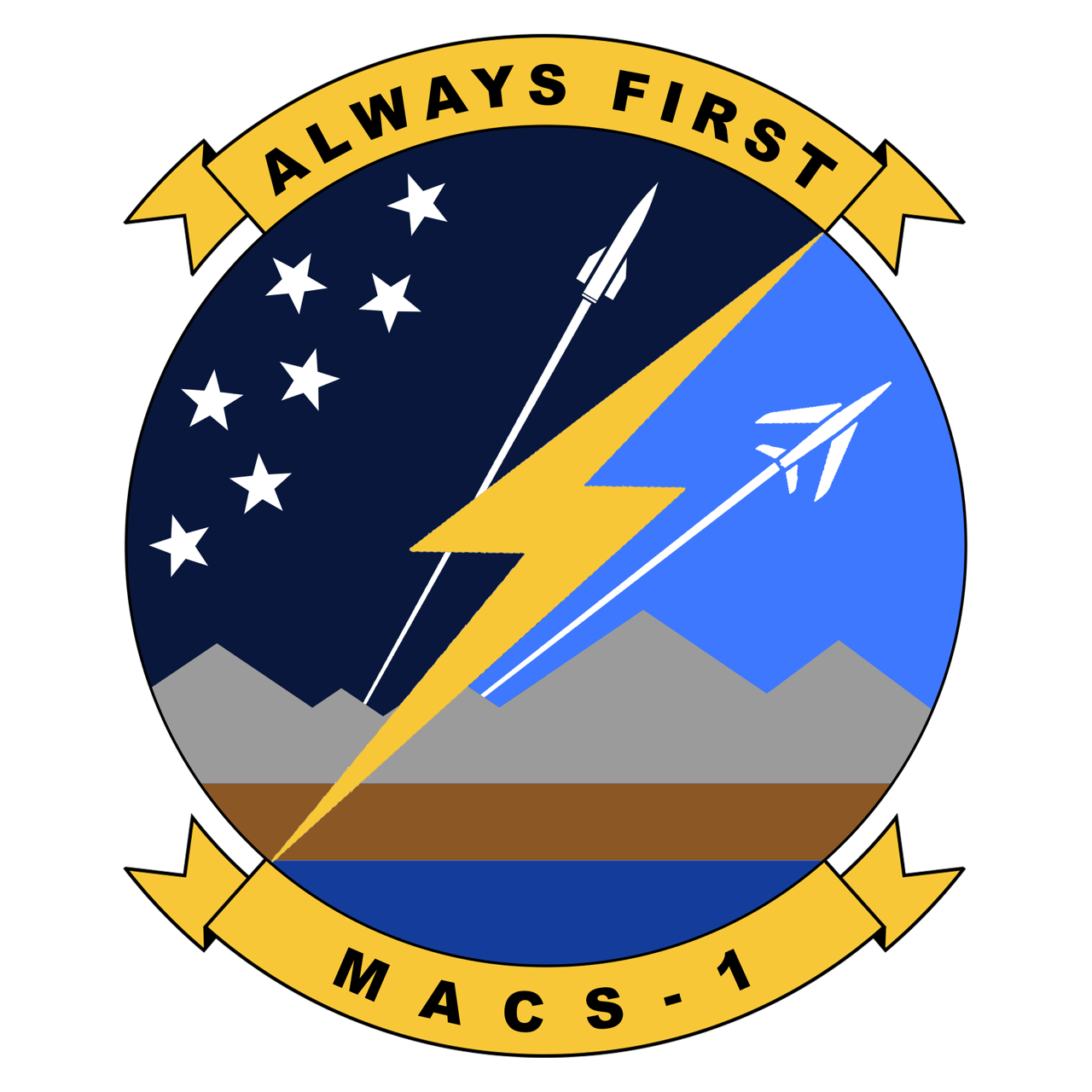
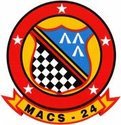
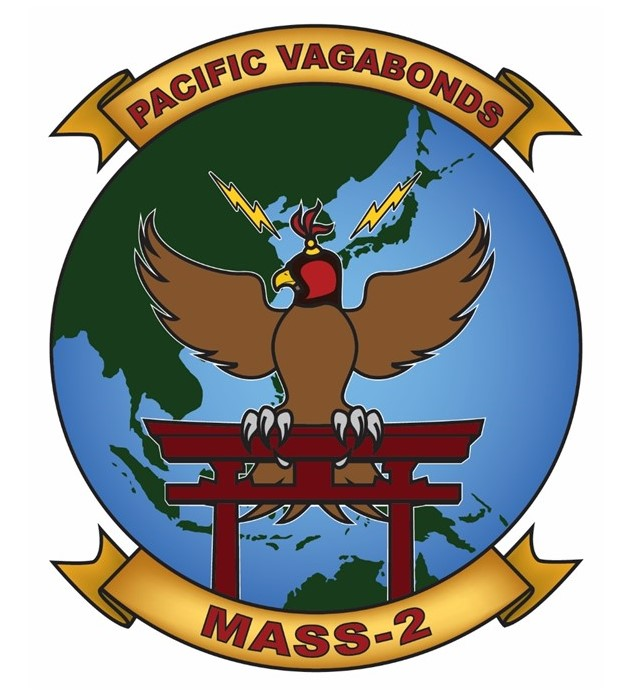
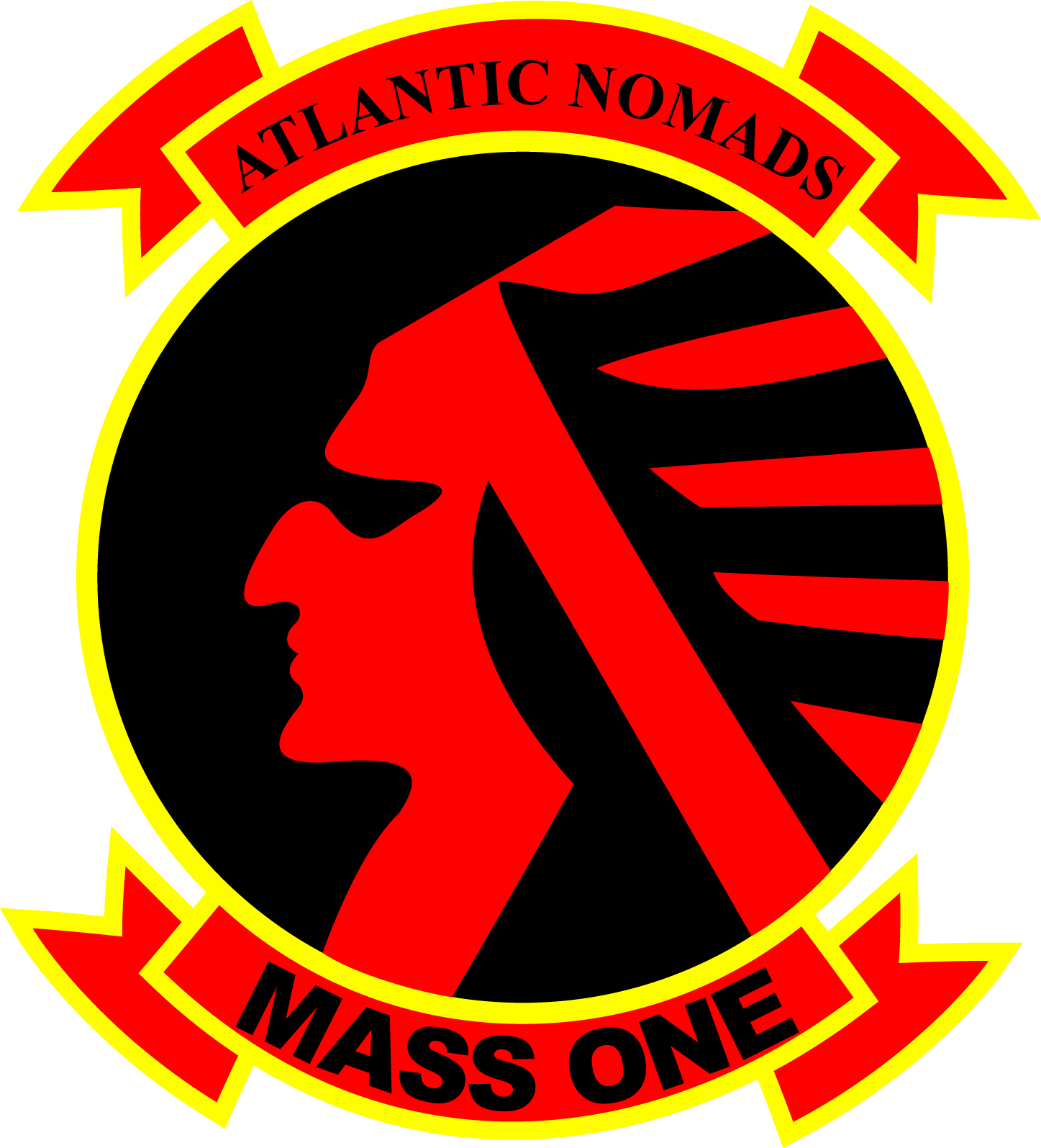
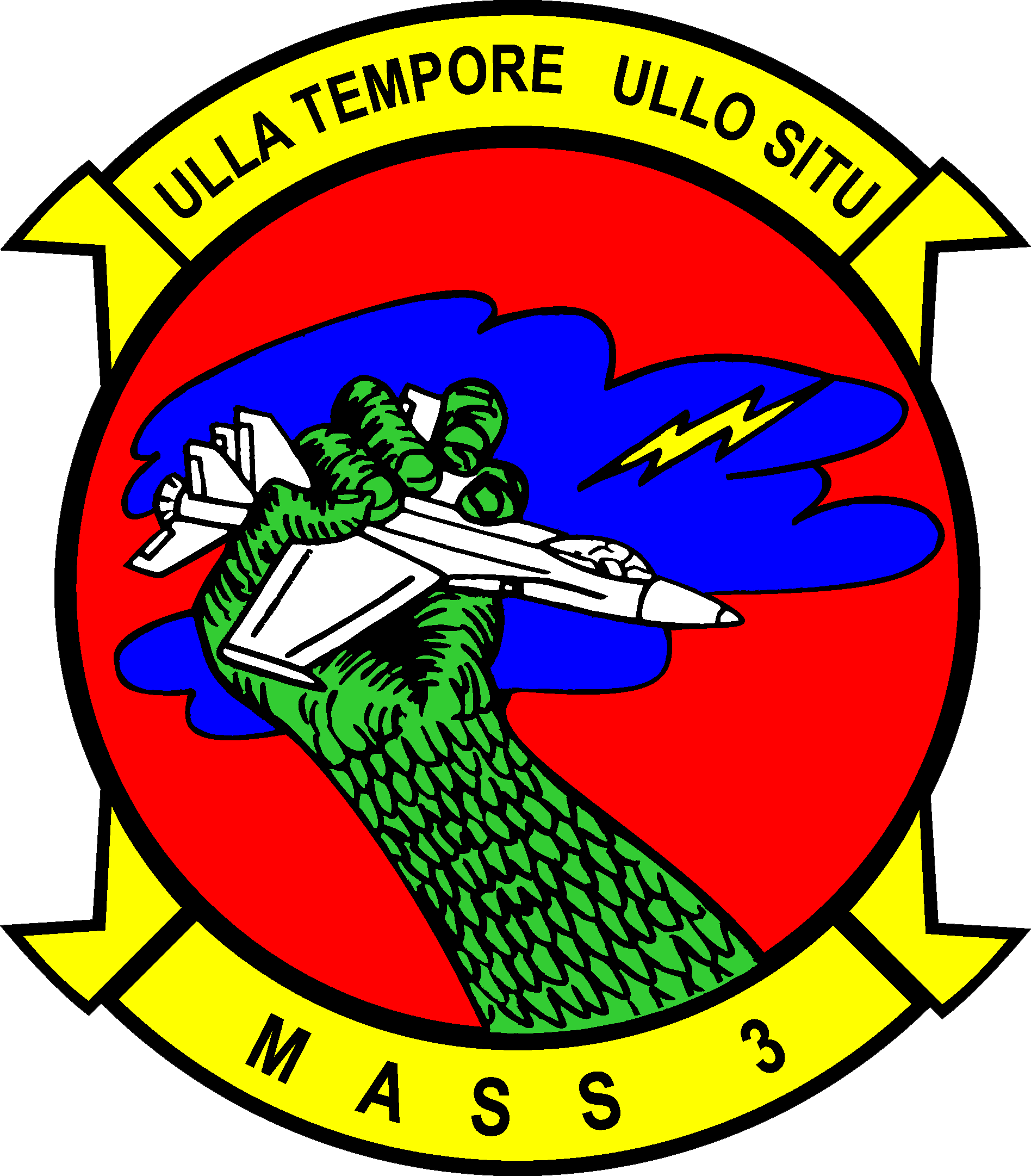
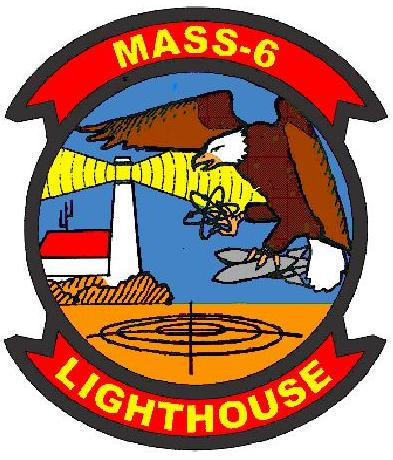
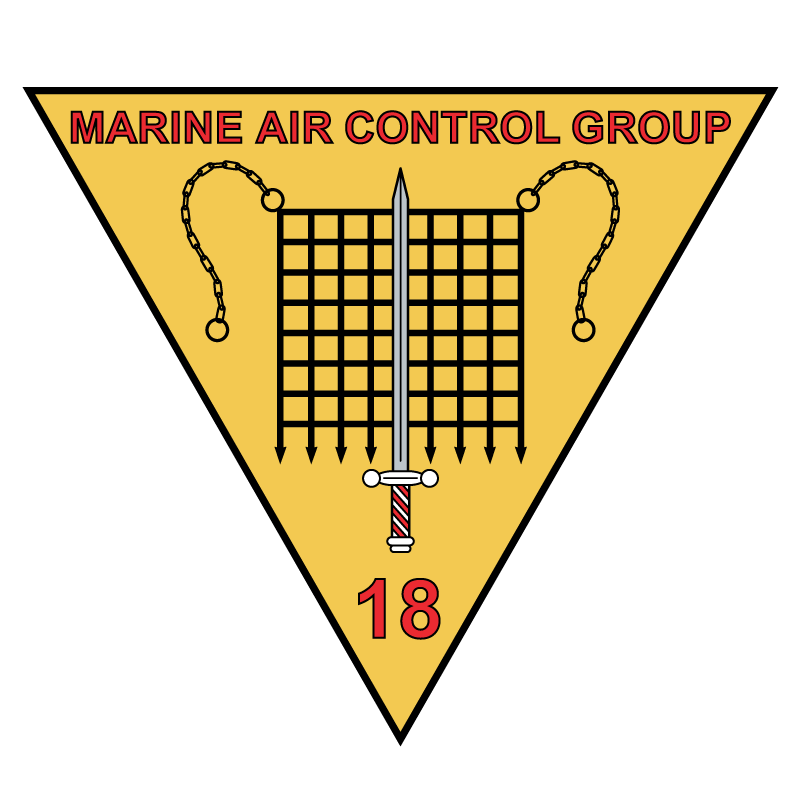
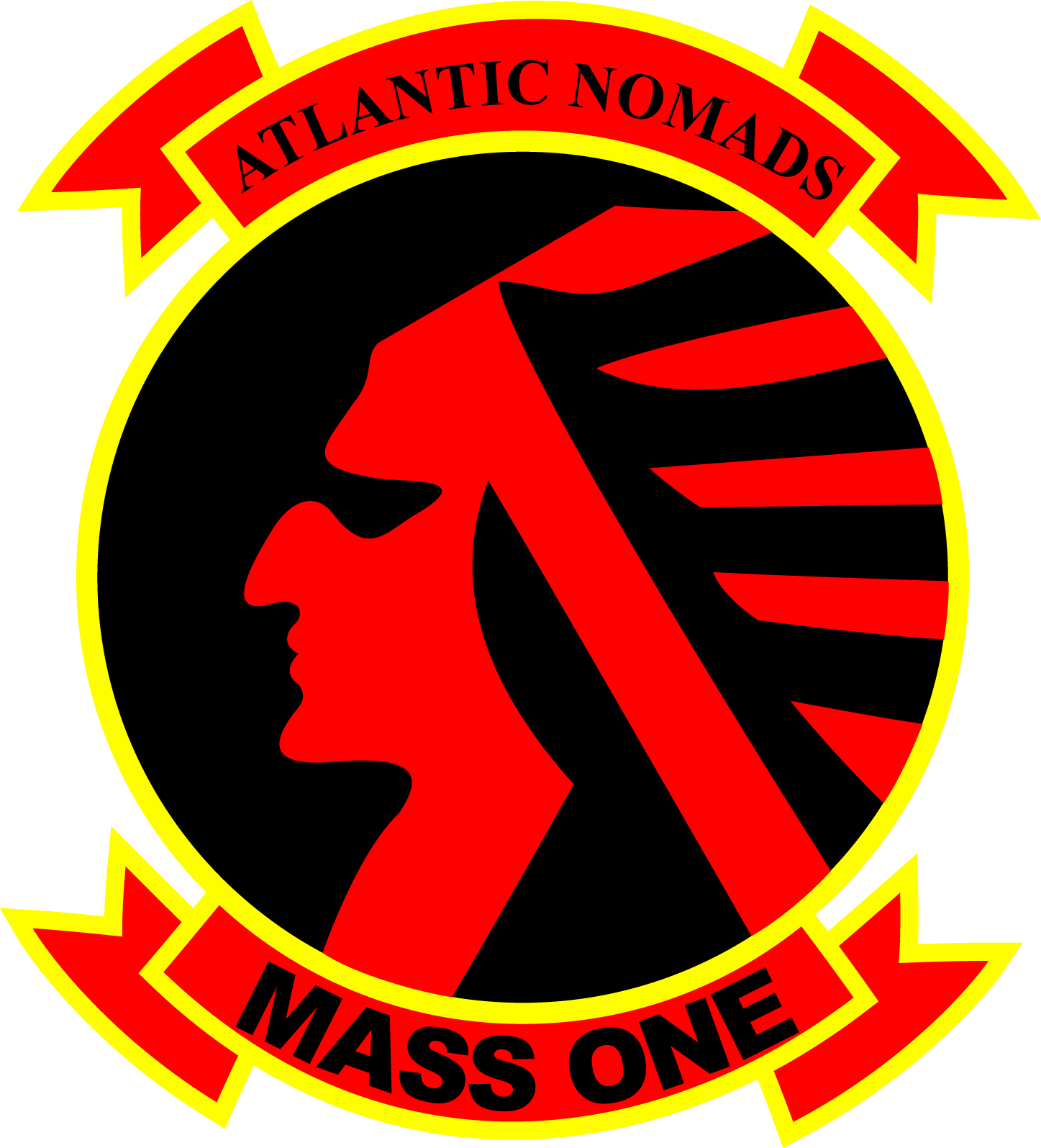
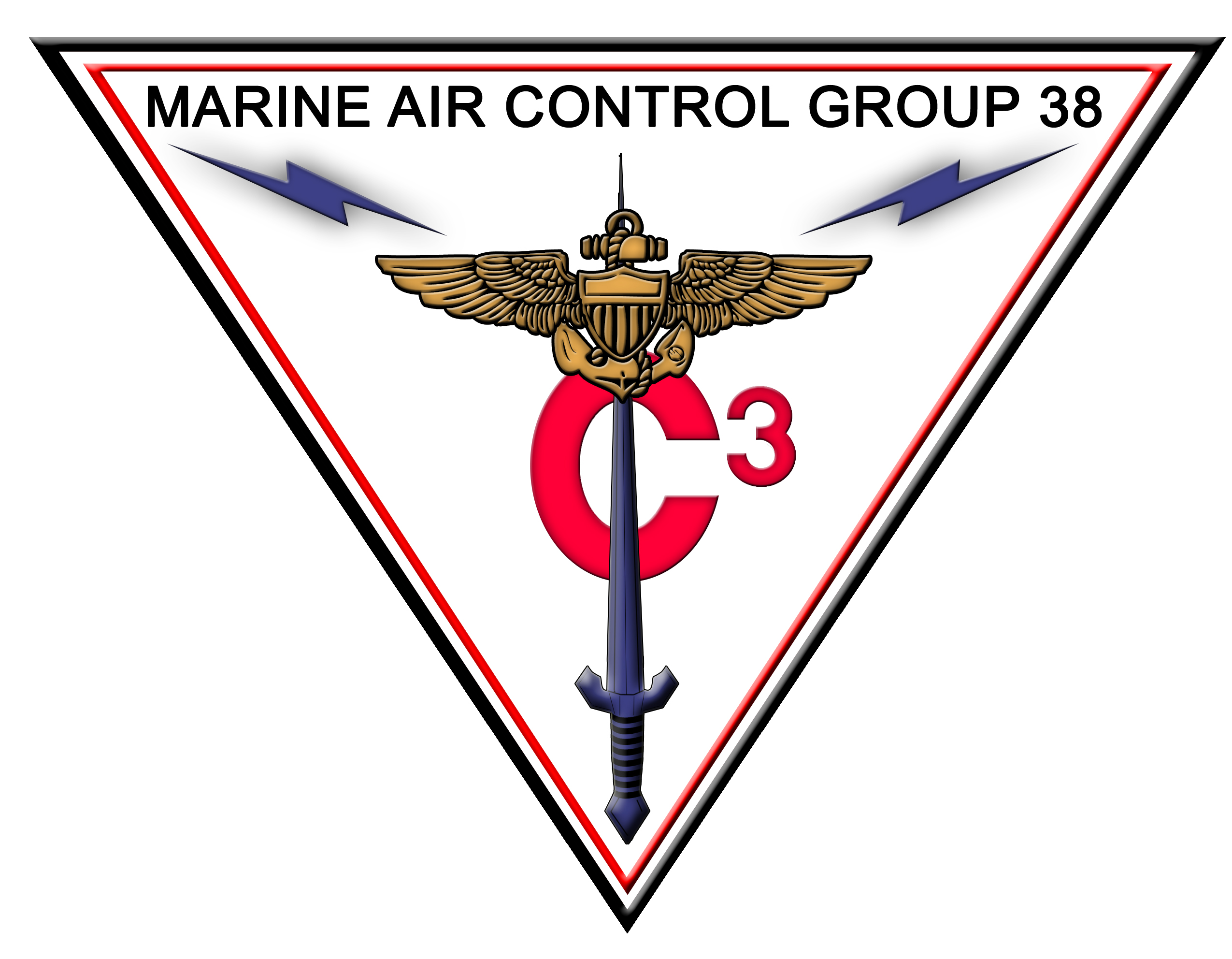
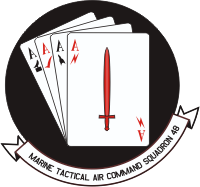
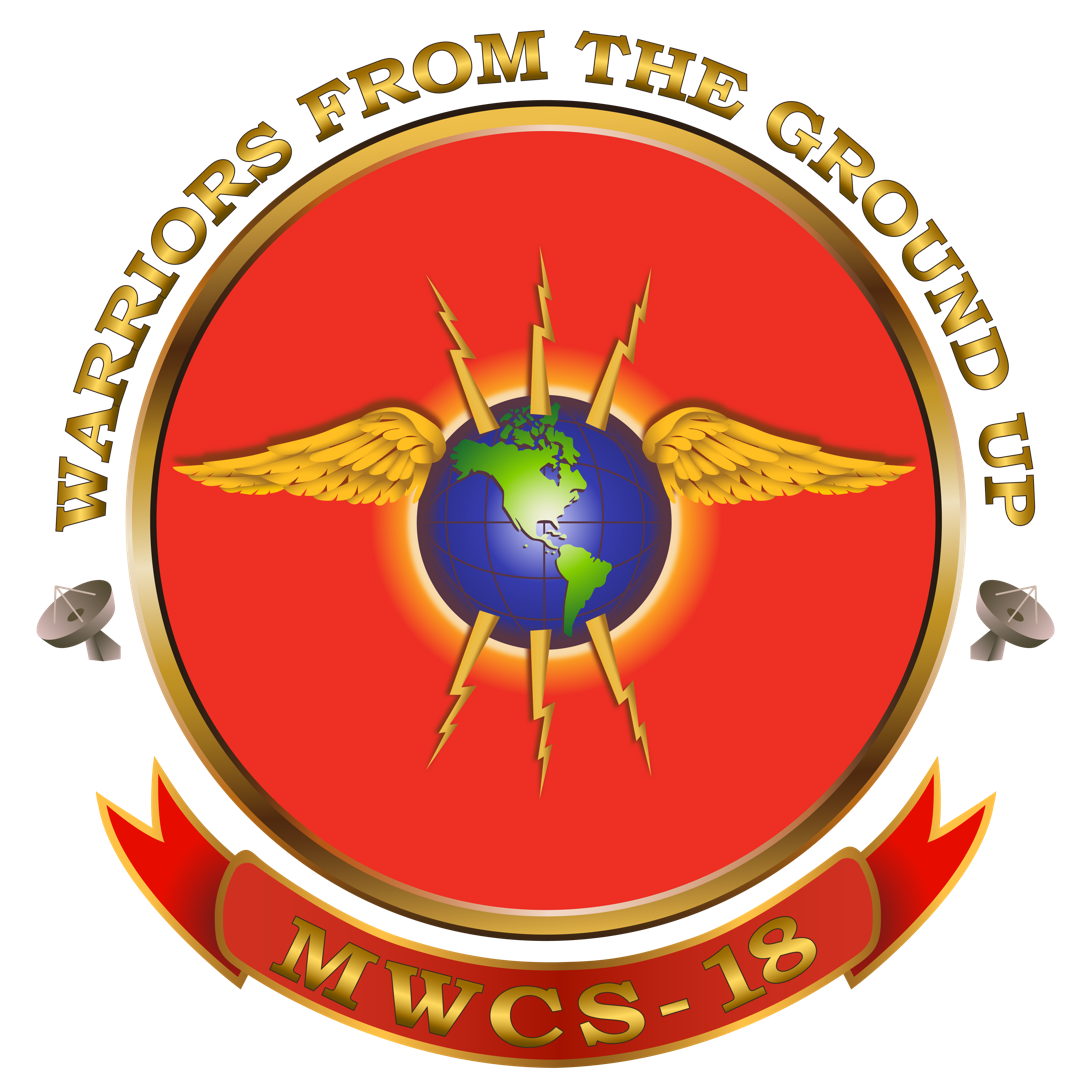
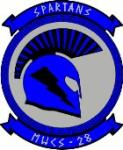
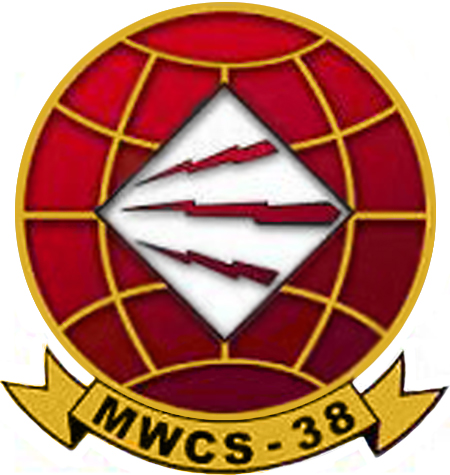
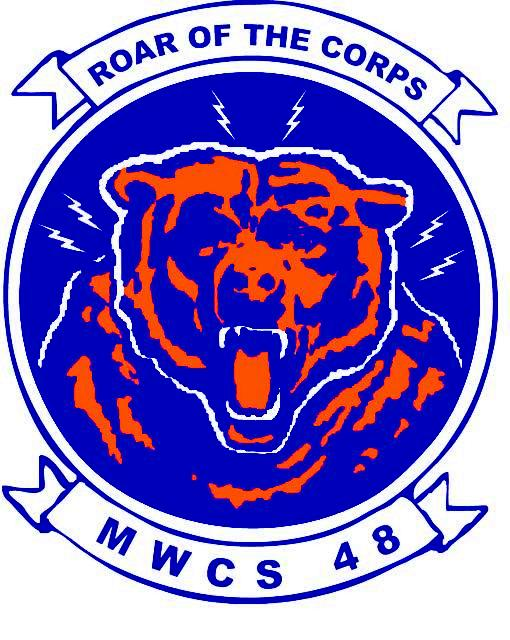
Agencies & Missions	MACG-18	MACG-28	MACG-38	MACG-48
Anti-aircraft warfare Surface-to-air missile MANPADS	1st LAAD Battalion	2d LAAD Battalion	3d LAAD Battalion
TAOC & ATC Dets; Early Warning; Ground-controlled interception Air traffic control Meteorology	Marine Air Control Squadron 4	Marine Air Control Squadron 2	Marine Air Control Squadron 1	Marine Air Control Squadron 24
DASC; Coordinate Close Air Support; Coordinate CASEVAC; Procedural control	Marine Air Support Squadron 2	Marine Air Support Squadron 1	Marine Air Support Squadron 3	Marine Air Support Squadron 6
TACC; ACE Headquarters	Marine Air Control Group 18 TACC Company	Marine Air Support Squadron 1 TACC Company	Marine Air Control Group 38 TACC Company	Marine Tactical Air Command Squadron 48
Long-haul communications Network operations center	Marine Wing Communications Squadron 18	Marine Wing Communications Squadron 28	Marine Wing Communications Squadron 38	Marine Wing Communications Squadron 48

== See also ==
- VMF(N)-531 GCI Detachment
- Marine Corps Early Warning Detachment, Guadalcanal (1942-43)
- Marine Detachment, Air Warning Service, Philippines (1941-42)
- List of United States Marine Corps aviation support squadrons
