= Marine Corps Early Warning Detachment, Guadalcanal (1942–43) =

Guadalcanal Radar Detachment
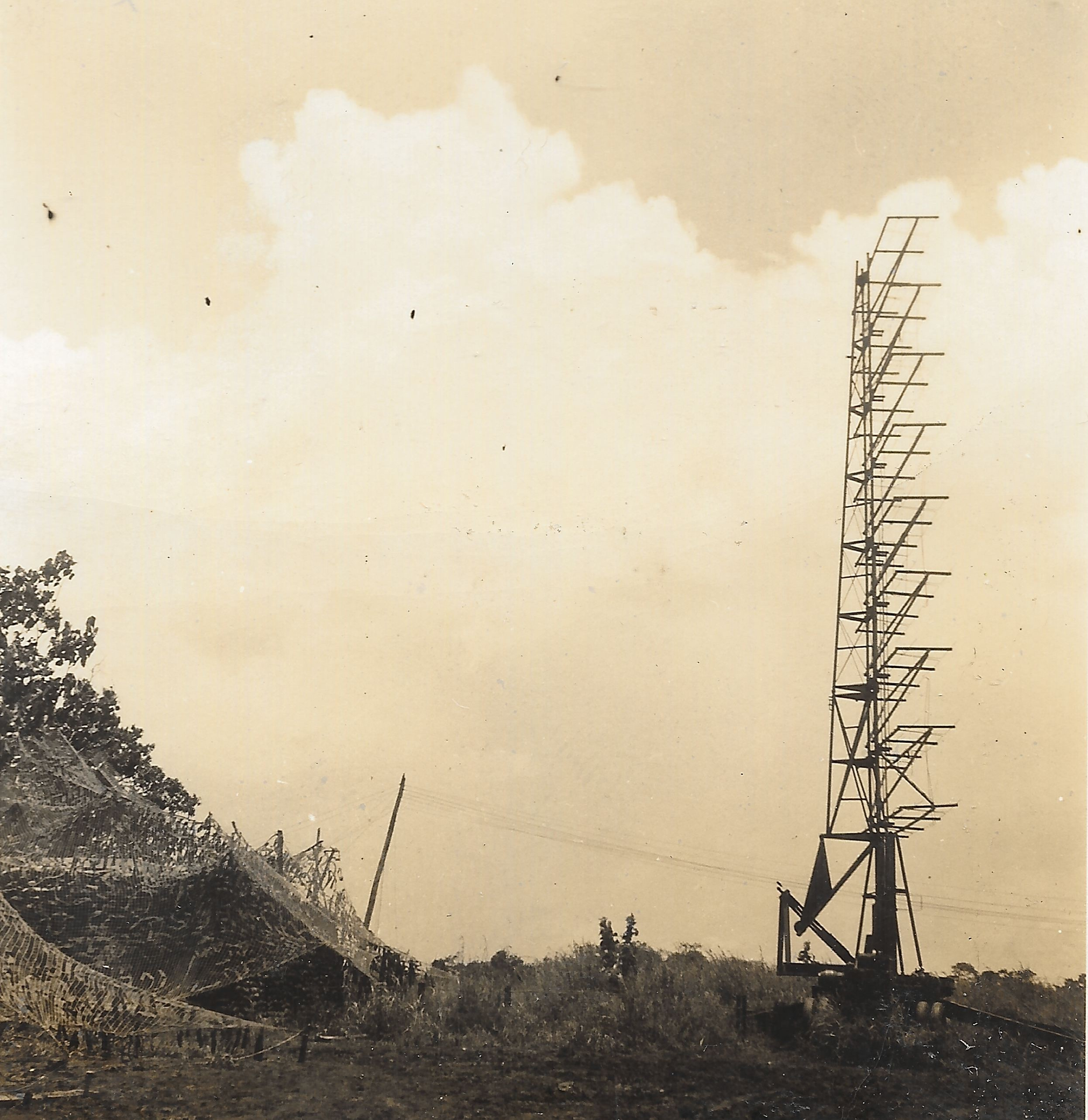
- SCR-270B utilized by the Guadalcanal Early Warning Detachment in late 1942.
- Active: June, 1942 - March 1943
- Country: United States
- Allegiance: United States of America
- Branch: United States Marine Corps
- Role: Early warning
- Part of: N/A
- Engagements: World War II; Battle of Guadalcanal

Commanders
- Notable commanders: LtCol Walter L. J. Bayler

The Marine Corps Early Warning Detachment, Guadalcanal (1942–43) was a ground based early-warning radar detachment that provided long range detection and rudimentary fighter direction against Japanese air raids during the Battle of Guadalcanal. Initially deployed as part of the headquarters of Marine Aircraft Group 23, this detachment established an SCR-270 long range radar that allowed the Cactus Air Force to husband its critically short fighter assets during the early stages of the battle when control of the island was still very much in doubt. The detachment arrived on Guadalcanal on 28 August 1942, began operating in mid-September, and did not depart until early March 1943. Combat lessons learned from this detachment had a great deal of influence on the Marine Corps' development of its own organic, large scale air warning program which began in early 1943.

== History ==
=== Background ===
Dermott H. MacDonnell enlisted into the Marine Corps in Boston, Massachusetts on 9 April 1942, and immediately attained the rank of Staff Sergeant based on previous technical experience. He was immediately sent to Marine Corps Base Quantico, Virginia to attend the Marine Corps' newly established radar school. Two months later he led a detachment of nine Marines attached to Marine Aircraft Group 12 (MAG-12) at Camp Kearney in San Diego, California for a few weeks of training on radar problems in the California desert. The detachment departed San Diego at the end of July and arrived in Oahu, Hawaii on 3 August joining Marine Aircraft Group 23 (MAG-23). The Marines immediately boarded another ship headed west for Efate with follow on orders to Guadalcanal.

In December 1941, then Major Walter L. J. Bayler became the "Last Man off Wake Island" because it was imperative that the Marine Corps remove him before the fall of Wake because he was one of the few Marine Corps officers that had experience establishing air-ground communications networks and he also had knowledge of the United States' still top secret radar program. Bayler was later sent to Midway to establish radar posts and fighter direction networks to support the 6th Defense Battalion prior to the Battle of Midway. Bayler flew into Guadalcanal himself, piloting a Grumman J2F Duck on 29 August 1942. Serving as the communications officer for Marine Aircraft Group 23, his mission once again was to establish air-to-ground communications facilities.

On 7 August 1942, the First Marine Division landed on Tulagi and Guadalcanal at Lunga Point, capturing the partially completed Japanese airfield and marking the first counter-offensive taken by the Allies in the Pacific Theater. Air interdiction and combat air patrol over the newly established beachhead were provided by aircraft from the aircraft carriers USS Enterprise (CV-6), USS Saratoga (CV-3) and USS Wasp (CV-7). Three naval aviators from the Wasp were detailed to the Tulagi Task Force flag ship USS Neville (APA-9) to serve as fighter directors while two naval aviators from the Enterprise controlled from the Guadalcanal Task Force flag ship USS McCawley (APA-4).

When the Navy's carriers departed early in the campaign, it became readily apparent that the Marine Corps had failed to properly plan for land based fighter direction. This left the nascent beachhead exposed to enemy air attacks for nearly six weeks after the initial landing. More construction work began on Henderson immediately, mainly using captured Japanese equipment. On 12 August, the airfield was renamed Henderson Field, for Major Lofton R. Henderson, who was killed during the Battle of Midway and who was the first Marine Corps pilot killed during the battle. By 18 August, Henderson Field was ready for operation. On 3 September, the commander of the 1st Marine Aircraft Wing, U.S. Marine Brigadier General Roy S. Geiger, arrived with his staff and took command of all air operations at Henderson Field. Air battles between the Allied aircraft at Henderson and Japanese bombers and fighters from Rabaul continued almost daily.

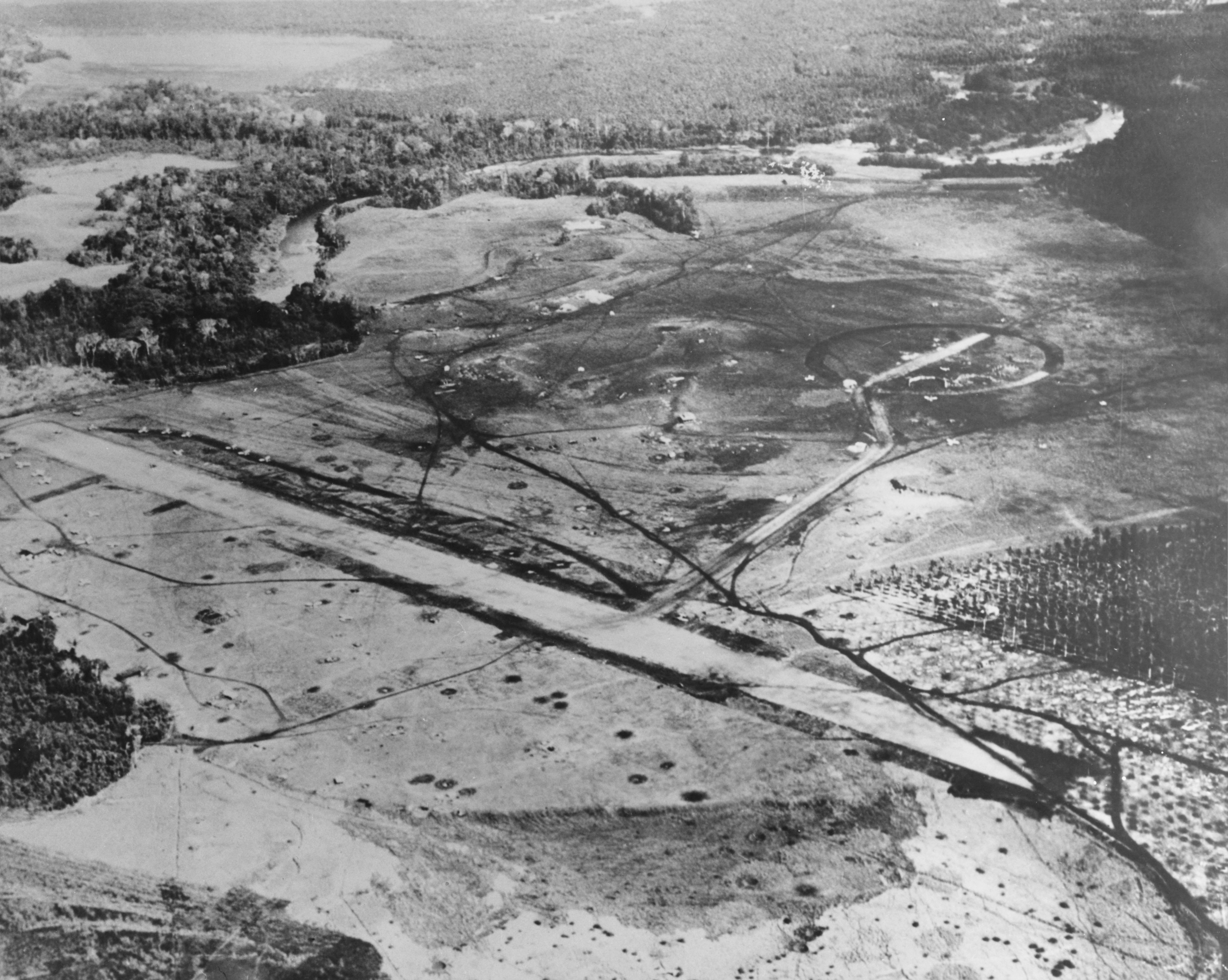
Henderson Field in late August 1942.

After the initial landings, the Japanese began immediately sending bombers and fighters south from the main airbases at Rabaul, Buka & Buin. On the morning of 7 August, the Imperial Japanese Navy's 5th Air Attack Force's air strength consisted of 39 fighters, 32 medium bombers, 16 dive bombers, and 17 seaplanes, including the 15 seaplane aircraft at Tulagi that were destroyed in the initial Allied air strikes during the landings on Tulagi and Guadalcanal. Air battles between Allied aircraft at Henderson and Japanese bombers and fighters from Rabaul continued almost daily for the opening months of the campaign. The eight-hour round-trip flight from Rabaul to Guadalcanal, about 1,120 miles (1,800 km), seriously hampered Japanese efforts to establish air superiority over Henderson Field.

On 20 August, the first Marine pilots landed their aircraft at Henderson Field. As part of MAG-23, flying from the escort aircraft carrier USS Long Island, these first aircraft included 18 x F4F Wildcat fighter planes of VMF-223 led by Major John L. Smith and 12 x SBD Dauntless dive bombers of VMSB-232 led by Lt. Colonel Richard Mangrum. These aircraft were operational the next day and conducted combat missions.

=== Operation ashore on Guadalcanal ===
Newly promoted Master Technical Sergeant MacDonnell and his detachment arrived on Guadalcanal on 28 August. The detachment's gear was unable to get ashore that day as the ships quickly steamed off for the safety of Tulagi harbor based on reports of an incoming Japanese air raid. This delayed the setting up of radar equipment as it was unloaded at Tulagi and had to be ferried back over to Guadalcanal via Landing craft tank. On 2 September, the 3rd Defense Battalion began operating its SCR-270 early-warning radar (callsign Radar One) at Henderson Field, which, along with reports from the coastwatchers, provided the first early warning of incoming Japanese warplanes. The radars of the 3d Defense Battalion were meant to cue air defense artillery and were not able to provide fighter direction to friendly aircraft to assist with aerial intercepts. A few days later two additional SCR-268 fire-control radars also became operational to provide more accurate data for the battalion's 90mm anti-aircraft weapons.

"In short, improvisation under wretched conditions was the key to Cactus operations."

— Lt Lewis C. Mattison, Fighter Director, 1st Marine Aircraft Wing.

The detachment selected a site for their radar on top of a hill a mile south of Henderson Field and began operations on 20 September. The radars on Guadalcanal were not part of a larger air defense network in the Solomon Islands. The individual radars provided information via landline to the firing batteries of the 3d Defense Battalion and to the 1st Marine Aircraft Wing's fighter directors led by LtCol Bayler. At the outset of the campaign, Maj Joseph N. Renner, the MAG-23 Operations Officer, also provided ad-hoc fighter control when able. Because the Marine Corps had no doctrine for conducting fighter direction in concert with anti-aircraft artillery the actions of these two radars units and the fighter controllers were not integrated or operationally aligned. Upon receiving radar reports of an incoming Japanese air raid, the fighter director was driven, in a special communications truck outfitted with a salvaged radio from a wrecked Grumman F4F Wildcat, to a control center about a mile away that had been dug into the side of a hill. From there the fighter director controlled the intercept. They had also worked out a series of flag signals to alert all of the Marines in the vicinity of the 1st MAW headquarters building about the status of Japanese air activity. No flag flying from the top of the headquarters meant "all clear," or Condition Green. When a Japanese raid was inbound, a white flag was flown to signify Condition Yellow along with the sounding of a siren. When the raid was two minutes out, a black flag was raised for Condition Red, meaning everyone should find shelter quickly.

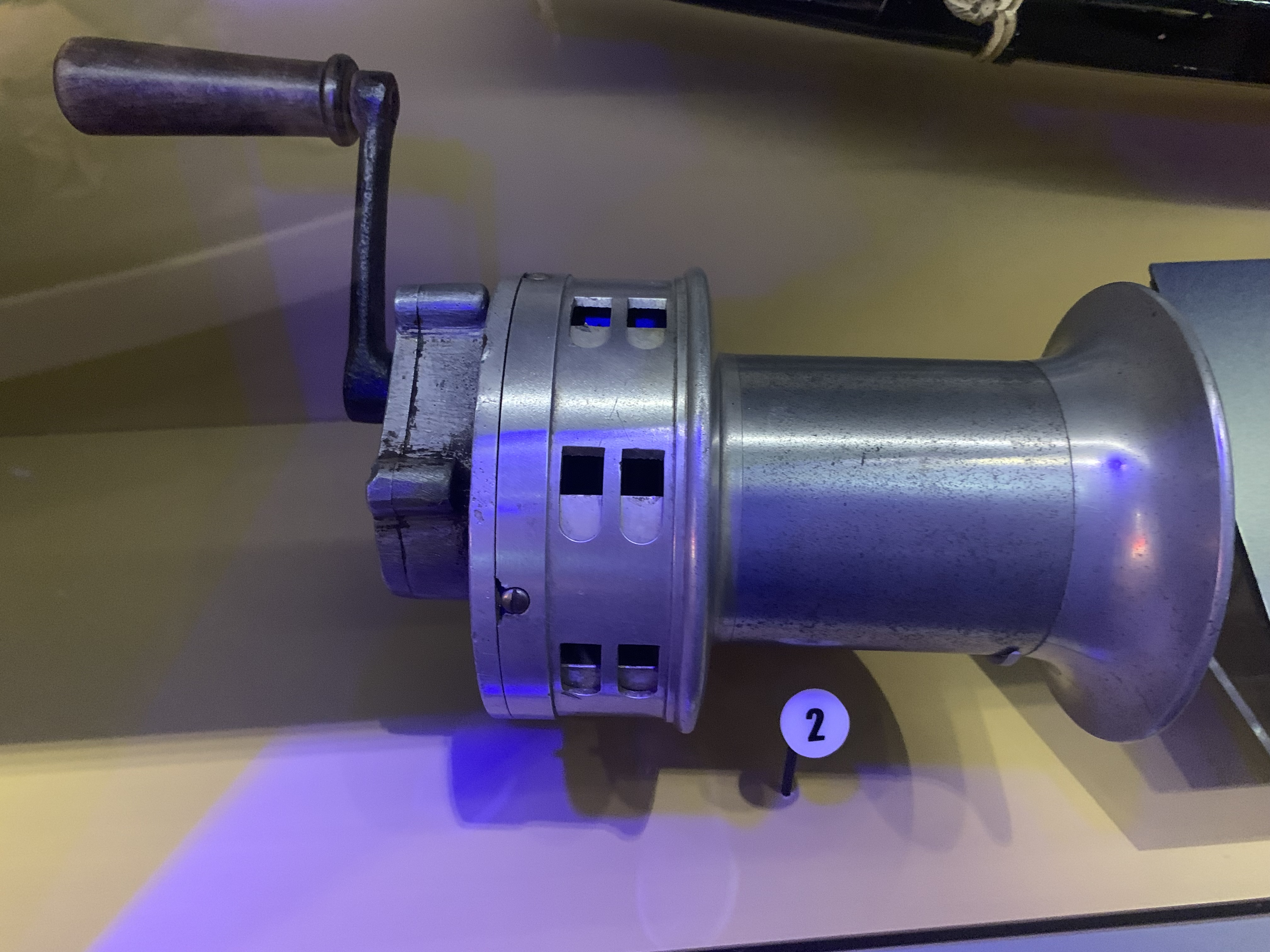
Japanese siren utilized by the 1st Marine Aircraft Wing during the Battle of Guadalcanal. This siren is on display at the National Museum of the Marine Corps.

During the course of the battle, the men and equipment of the radar detachment were constantly exposed to enemy small arms fire, artillery shelling, naval gunfire, and aerial bombardment. MTSgt MacDonnell's efforts keeping the SCR-270 operational during this time was key to the air defense of Guadalcanal. MTSgt MacDonnell also was a radar operator who pioneered new tactics and techniques for the SCR-270. Knowing that the radar array could tilt backwards 10 degrees, MacDonnell determined that by taking a reading at both perpendicular and tilted backwards an approximate altitude could be derived. He also became adept at deciphering the returns on the radar's oscilloscope to determine the number and mixture of aircraft headed towards Guadalcanal. Applying radars returns against his knowledge of the aircraft formations of the Tainan Air Group he noticed radar echoes that jiggled, which coupled with airspeed, highlighted the location of the Mitsubishi A6M Zeros in the formations.

Additional fighter controllers arrived on 8 October 1942, when Navy Lieutenant Lewis C Mattison led a detachment of four controllers having recently graduated from the Navy's Fighter Director School at Pearl Harbor. In 1 November MAW Control Center migrated to a dugout in the side of a hill that offered better protection against enemy fires, improved air-ground communications, and enhanced coordination between fighter directors and ground based air defense units.

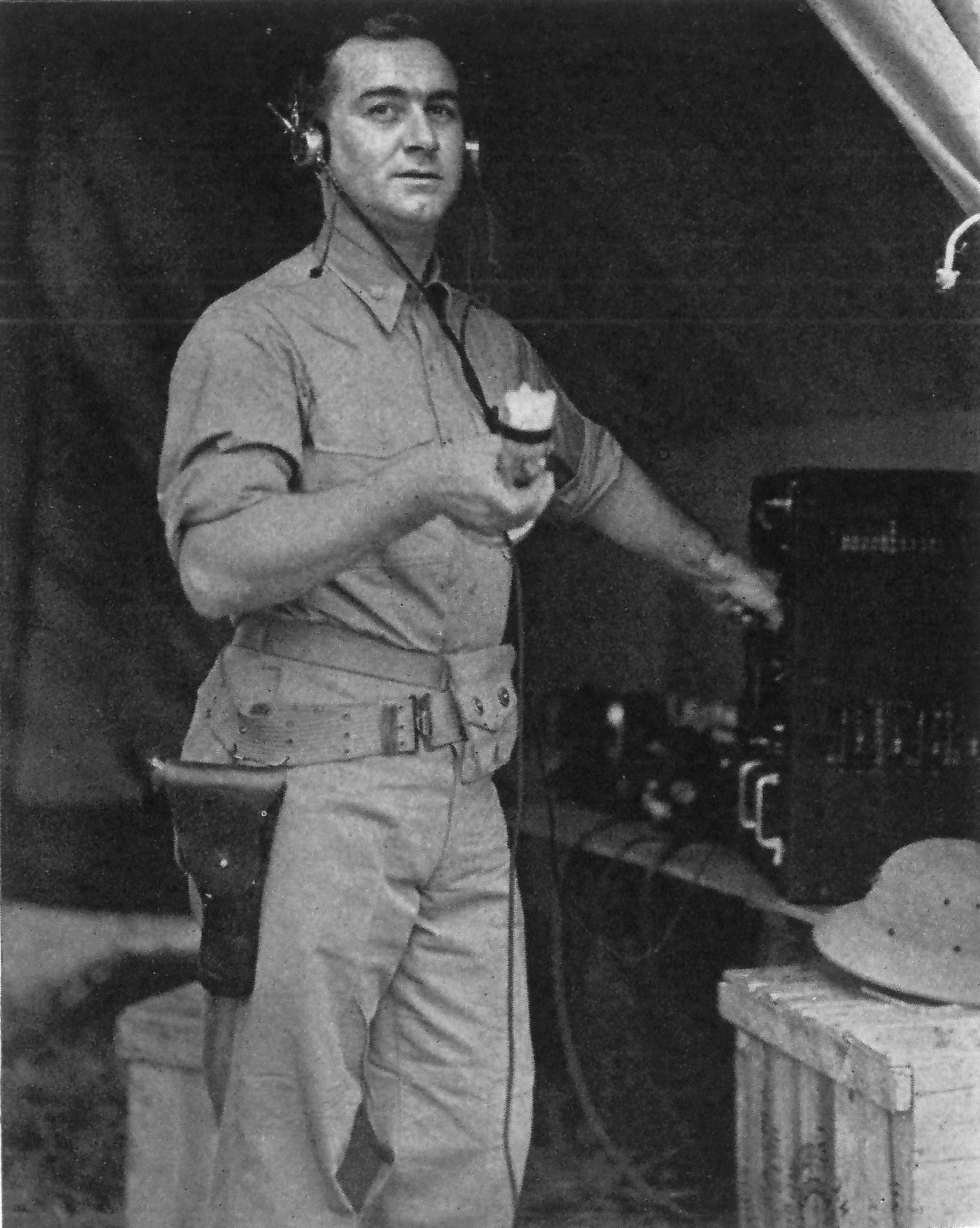
LtCol Bayler controlling fighter aircraft during the Battle of Guadalcanal.

The Marine radar detachment on Guadalcanal was relieved by a radar crew from the Royal New Zealand Air Force in March 1943. At the time there was a shortage of American radars available for the Pacific so Admiral William Halsey asked the New Zealand government if they could assist. The Marine Corps attached three officers and a senior NCO to this detachment, led by Major Ethridge C. Best, to assist with training and to provide liaison with American fighter units.

== Legacy ==
The Japanese inability to retake Guadalcanal is largely to do with air operations conducted by the Cactus Air Force. The early warning radars and fighter direction provided by the Guadalcanal Radar Detachment were critical to that effort by allowing the Cactus Air Force to husband its critically short fighter planes during the most desperate days of the battle when supply lines were tenuous at best. Instead of maintaining a permanent combat air patrol overhead, fighters were held on the ground until Japanese aircraft were inbound from the Northern Solomon Islands. Difficult coordination between the 1st MAW's Fighter Direction Center and the 3d Defense Battalion highlighted to Marine leadership that tactics, techniques and procedures needed to be developed for fighter aircraft operating in the vicinity of friendly anti-aircraft artillery. This detachment was never part of the early lore of the Cactus Air Force immediately after the battle because radar was still a top secret technology thus its contributions were never properly added as the first stories from Guadalcanal were being written.

The development of the Marine Corps' night fighter program was further hastened by reports from the Cactus Air Force on Guadalcanal that enemy night raids were having debilitating effects on the Marines on the ground. The Japanese sent solitary aircraft, nicknamed Washing Machine Charlie, on night-time missions over Guadalcanal to bomb airfield and installations, drop flares over Allied positions to assist Japanese naval or ground forces operating on or near the island, and harass troops and disrupt their sleep. Marine Night Fighting Squadron 531 (VMF(N)-531) was commissioned on 16 November 1942, with its own stand alone GCI Detachment to specifically combat against these night hecklers. VMF(N)-531, with its GCI Detachment, deployed overseas in August 1943 and eventually controlled the first successful night interception in the Pacific working with an F4U-2 Corsair from the U.S. Navy's VF(N)-75.

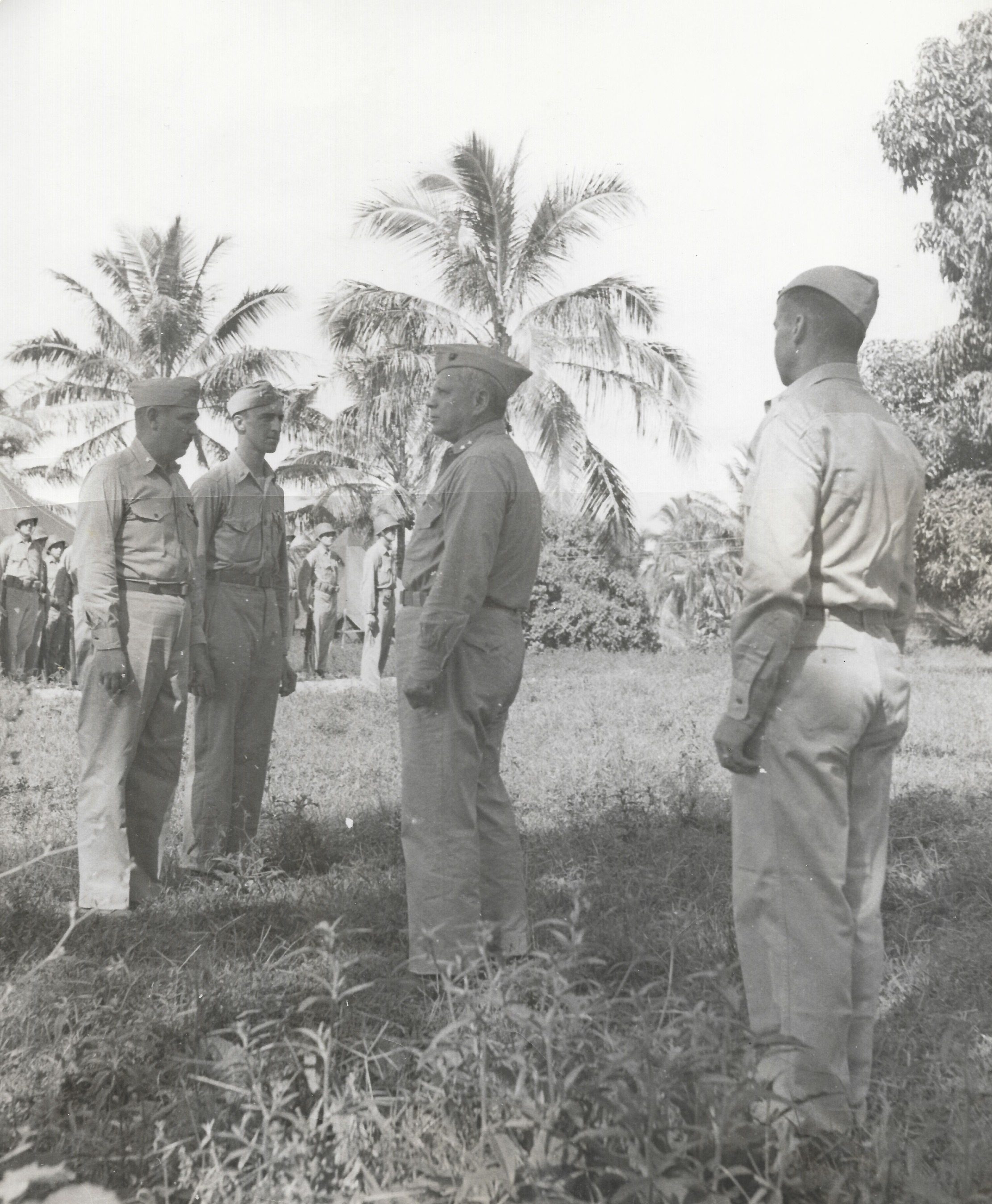
MajGen Roy Geiger (2nd from right), Commanding General 1st Marine Aircraft Wing (1st MAW), awarding the Navy Cross to Colonel Al Cooley (far left) and the Silver Star to Master Technical Sergeant Dermott H. MacDonnell on Guadalcanal in early 1943.

LtCol Bayler received a Legion of Merit for his actions during the Battle of Guadalcanal. He returned to the United States in February 1943 just as the Commandant of the Marine Corps was convening a "Radar Policy Board." The board was tasked with making recommendations regarding the establishment of a program for radar early warning, radar fire control, and radar fighter direction for Marine Corps units during amphibious operations. Board recommendations included the organization of air warning squadrons and groups requiring nearly 12,000 officers and Marines, placing organic fighter direction with night fighter squadrons and the creation of an Air Defense Section within the Division of Aviation at Headquarters Marine Corps. The report, "Standard Operating Procedures for Radar Air and Surface Warning and Radar Fire Control in the Marine Corps," was published on 17 March 1943, and later endorsed by the Commandant of the Marine Corps on 4 May 1943. On 1 July 1943 newly promoted Colonel Bayler became the first Commanding Officer of the 1st Marine Air Warning Group. He remained in this role for the next 9 months overseeing the establishment of the first thirteen air warning Squadrons. During this time he also helped co-author a book with Cecil Carnes on his early experiences in the war titled Last Man Off Wake Island.

Dermott H. MacDonnell remained on Guadalcanal until March 8, 1943, and was awarded the Silver Star and a field commission for his actions maintaining the SCR-270 radar during the campaign. Lieutenant MacDonnell returned to Marine Corps Air Station Cherry Point as a radar instructor with 1st MAWG. After his tour as an instructor, he was assigned to Air Warning Squadron 6 and participated in the Battle of Okinawa as a fighter controller. He remained in the Marine Corps and later served as a company commander of the 1st Marine Division's Reconnaissance Company during the Korean War.

== Gallery ==
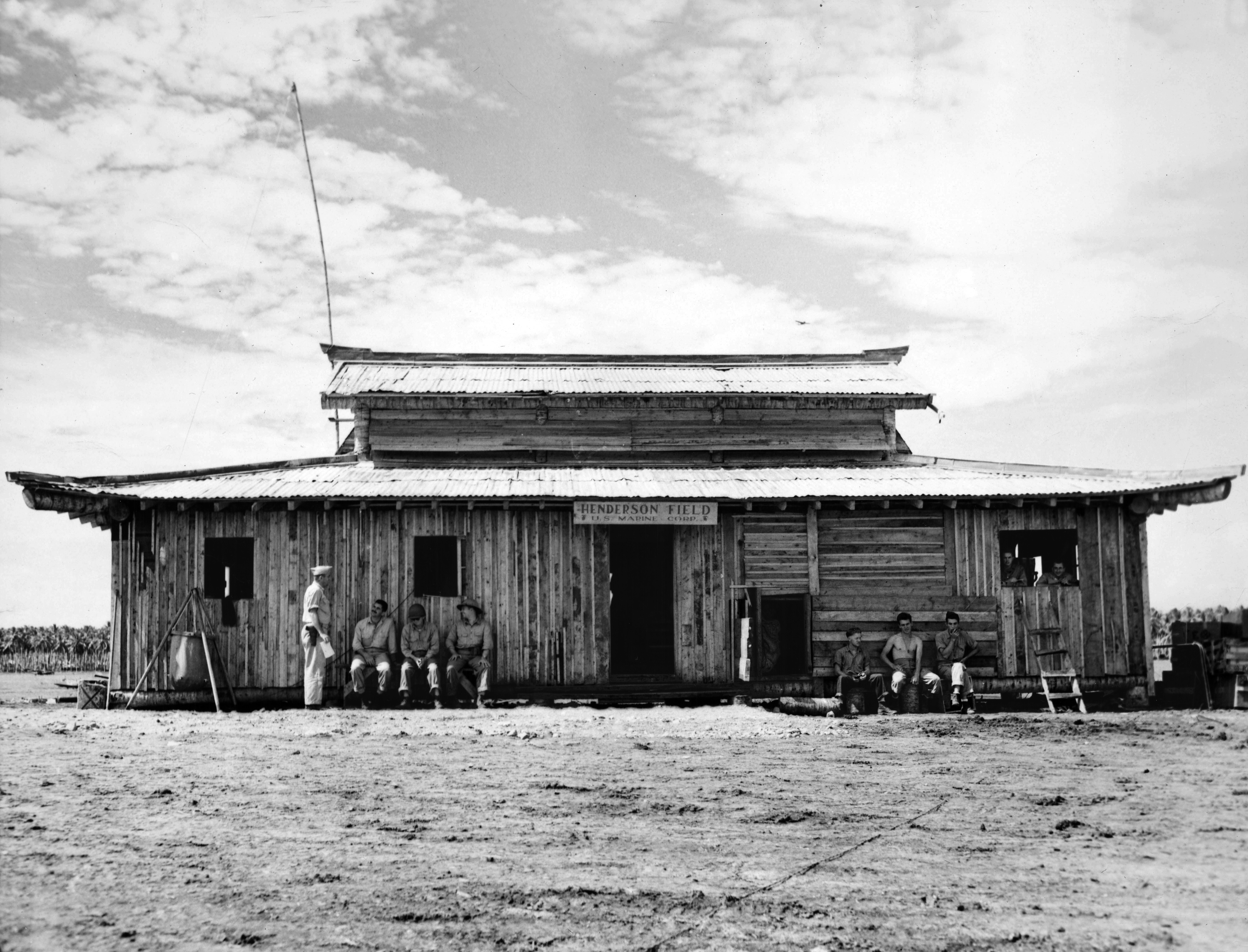
The Pagoda where LtCol Bayler maintained his watch prior to enemy air raids.

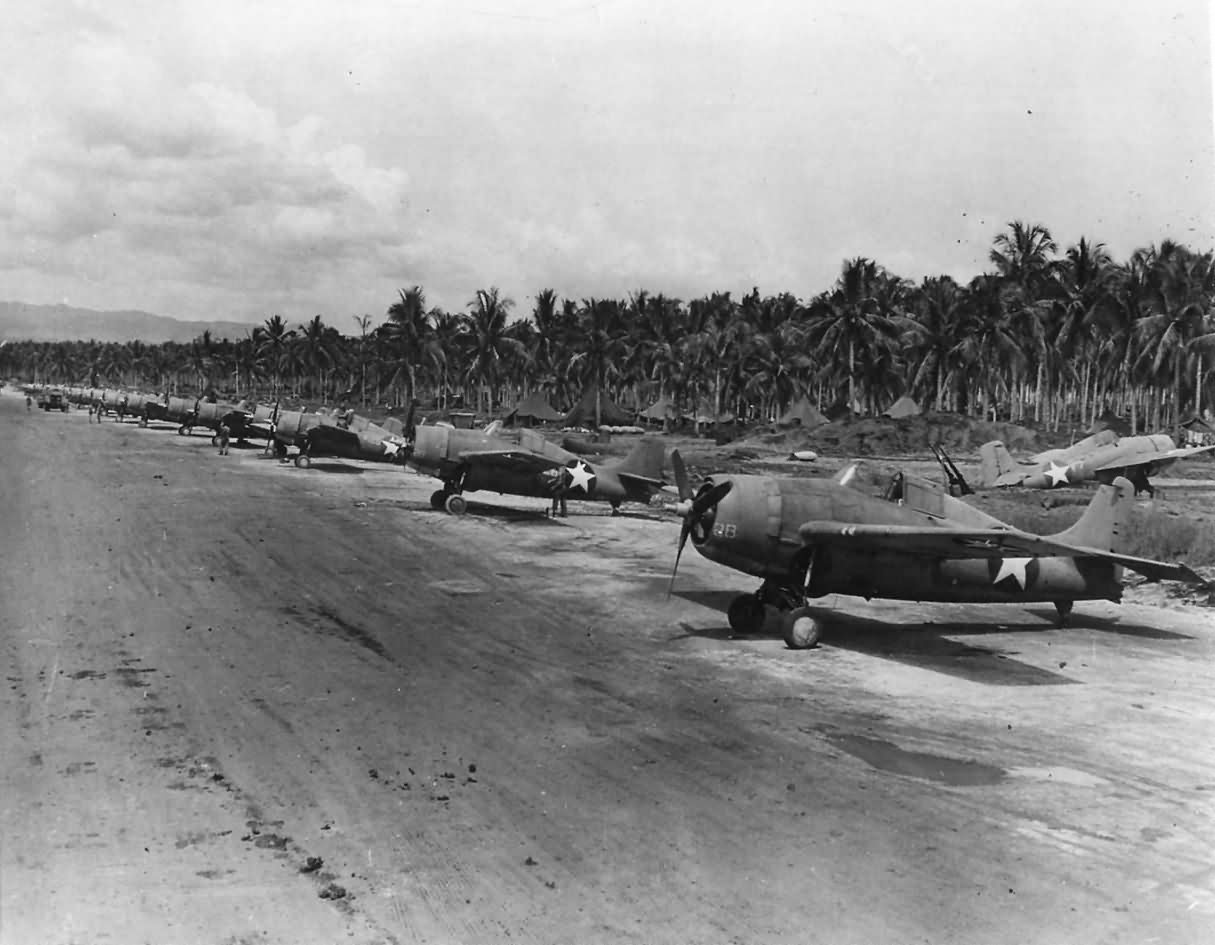
F4F-4 Wildcats on Guadalcanal

== See also ==
- United States Marine Corps Aviation
- Marine Air Command and Control System
- VMF(N)-531 GCI Detachment
- Marine Detachment, Air Warning Service, Philippines (1941-42)
