= Marine Detachment, Air Warning Service, Philippines =

- Active: Nov 1941 – 8 April 1942
- Country: United States
- Branch: United States Marine Corps
- Role: Early warning
- Part of: 3rd Battalion, 4th Marines
- Nicknames: "The Rogues of Bataan" "Radio Bataan"
- Engagements: World War II; Philippines campaign (1941–1942)

Commanders
- Notable commanders: CWO John Brainard

The Marine Detachment, Air Warning Service, Philippines (active 1941–42) was a United States Marine Corps ground based early-warning radar detachment that provided long range detection and rudimentary fighter direction against Japanese air raids during the Japanese invasion of the Philippines in the early days of World War II. It was the first Marine Corps early warning detachment to participate in combat operations.

Initially organized at the Cavite Naval Base in November 1941 as a top secret unit within the headquarters of the 1st Separate Marine Battalion, the detachment operated an SCR-270 long range radar on the Bataan Peninsula for the duration of the Battle of Bataan. The detachment's operations allowed the very small number of American aircraft still flying in the Philippines to avoid contact with Japanese aircraft operating in the area. This radar unit gained a reputation for its member's ability to forage for supplies and equipment during the battle. This became necessary because as a Marine unit working away from its higher headquarters the unit never had a defined support plan or the correct supply requisition forms. This extra-curricular activity earned them the sobriquet "Rogues of Bataan."

Following the fall of Bataan, a majority of the detachment immediately became prisoners of war (POW) and took part in the Bataan Death March. A few members of the detachment were able to make it to Corregidor, however, they became POWs after the Battle of Corregidor. These men spent the remainder of the war as prisoners of war in the Philippines and later mainland Japan. Thirty-six personnel were known to have served in this detachment. Of them, 12 died in captivity while prisoners of war.

== History ==
=== Background ===
==== Air Warning Service ====
The "Warning Service" of the Philippine Department was established by September 1940. Functioning as an office of the Intelligence Section (G-2) of the department headquarters, the Warning Service operated an interim "Information and Operation Center" at Nielson Field that included an electrically lighted map to plot sightings that indicated origins of reports with twinkling lights. In lieu of working detection equipment and trained personnel, the Warning Service maintained a primitive system of 509 observation posts manned by 860 civilian watchers, unschooled in aircraft identification, who would report airplane movements by five radio, two telegraph, and ten telephone networks manned by members of all three U.S. military services, the Philippine Army and constabulary, the Philippine postal system, and civilian companies in the provinces. Interpreters were required for the many dialects used by the observers. Message processing encountered significant delays between the time of observation and time of report. (Note: Edmunds stated that in a pre-war exercise, 46 minutes elapsed before sightings were reported, plotted, and orders relayed to interceptors to take off to "protect" Clark Field.)

In January 1941, the War Department approved a request for radars and air warning units from MajGen George Grunert, commander of the Philippine Department. On 4 May 1941, the Warning Service was shifted to the new Philippine Department Air Force {PDAF} and renamed as the "Air Warning Service". A newly trained 194-man Signal Corps air warning company arrived by transport on 1 August to operate two SCR-271C fixed-location long range radars planned for deployment on Luzon, each with an approximate range of 150 mi (240 km). On 15 November the AWS was integrated into the new 5th Interceptor Command, plans for the fixed-location radar sites were only five percent complete and no date to begin construction had been set.

" The first SCR-270 allotted to the Philippines arrived two months later, about 1 October. At once the men uncrated and assembled it... Fortunately, this first set gave so little trouble that Lt. C. J. Wimer and a detachment of thirty men shortly were able to take the radar to Iba, an airstrip on the coast about a hundred miles to the northwest of Clark Field. By the end of October the Iba radar was in operation...Within the next two weeks three more SCR-270 sets arrived at Manila, as well as two SCR-271's in crates...Within a few days Lieutenant Rodgers set out by boat for Paracale, Camerines Norte Province, Luzon, about 125 miles southeast of Manila on the coast of the Philippine Sea. He took with him one of the better mobile sets and one of the crated SCR-271's, planning to use the mobile set until the permanent site for the fixed radar could be made ready. Rodgers and his men got their 270 set up, and started preliminary test operation by 1 December...Doling out the remaining radars in the closing days of November Colonel Campbell sent Lieutenant Weden of the Signal Company Aircraft Warning to a site some forty-five miles south of Manila on Tagaytay Ridge. Weden drew the damaged set. Any hope that it might work better in this location soon faded; the set could not be made to operate satisfactorily, although it was still useful for training. About 3 December another Signal Corps officer, Lt. Robert H. Arnold, rushed the last remaining SCR-270 to Burgos Point on the extreme northern tip of Luzon. Arnold arrived at his location on the night of 7 December. A few days earlier, the Marine Corps unit at Cavite had informed Colonel Campbell that it had just received a radar set, but that no one knew how to operate it. This was an SCR-268 radar, a short-range searchlight-control set developed for the Coast Artillery and not intended as an aircraft warning set, although it was sometimes used as such. A Signal Corps crew hurried to Cavite and helped the marines take the set to Nasugbu, below Corregidor, and on the southwest coast of Luzon." https://archive.org/details/TheSignalCorpsTheTest/page/n25/mode/2up

The Marine Corps radar detachment in the Philippines was formed in November 1941 at Cavite Naval Base as part of the communications section for Headquarters Company, 1st Separate Marine Battalion. The detachment originally had 29 men and was led by Chief Warrant Officer John Brainard with Master Technical Sergeant Clarence L. Bjork as the senior enlisted Marine. The Marine Corps also took possession of three radars that November – two SCR-268 Fire-control radars and one SCR-270B mobile long range radar. Because radar was still top secret at this time the Marines worked behind a guarded enclosure next to the supply department that no observers could see inside.

=== Combat operations ===
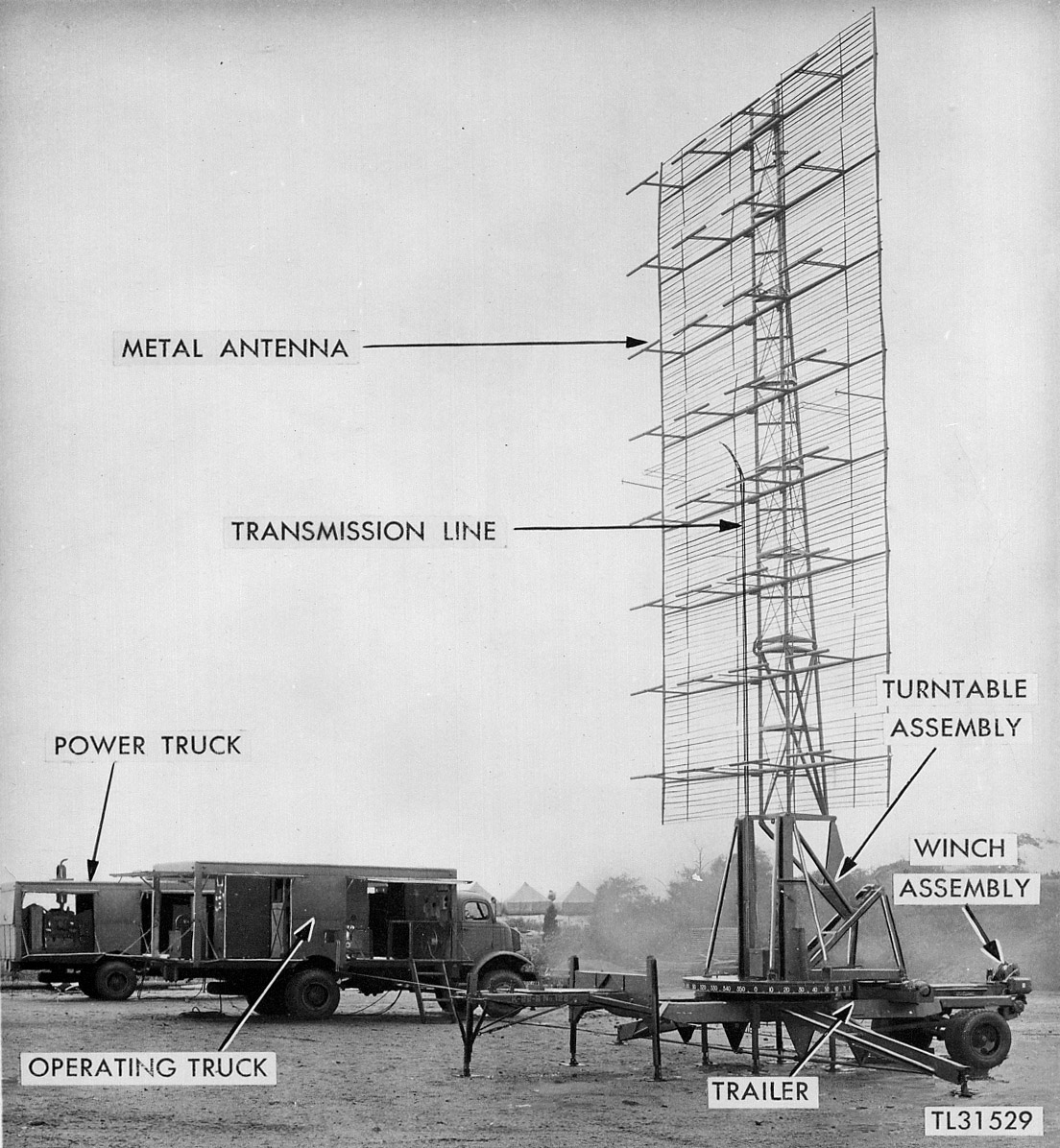
Photo depicts a representation of the SCR-270 radar that was used by the Marine's Air Warning Detachment in the Philippines from December 1941 through April 1942.

The Marine Corps' SCR-270 was ordered into the field on 4 December. The detachment established its position on Wawa Beach outside of Nasugbu in Batangas Province about 100 miles to the south. Commencing operations on 8 December, the detachment was placed under the operational control of the 5th Interceptor Command. On 10 December, Private First Class Irvin Scott, the only school trained radar operator in the detachment, observed a large blip on his radar screen approaching Manila Bay. Poor communications meant that only Corregidor could be reached to report the incoming raid. With no knowledge of the detachment's mission or of radar capabilities, the detachment's reports went unheralded. A few hours later, Cavite Naval Base was hit by a large number of Japanese bombers and killing hundreds of Marines and Filipino workers and rendering the base no longer usable.

As the first word of the Japanese attack on Pearl Harbor was received by commercial radio between 0300 and 0330 hours local. Within 30 minutes radar at Iba Airfield, Luzon plotted a formation of airplanes 75-miles (120-km) offshore, heading for Corregidor Island. P-40's were sent out to intercept but made no contact. By 1130 hours, the fighters sent into the air earlier landed for refueling, and radar disclosed another flight of Japanese aircraft 70-miles (112-km) West of Lingayen Gulf, headed south. Fighters from Iba Field made another fruitless search over the South China Sea. The P-40's sent on patrol of the South China Sea returned to Iba with fuel running low at the beginning of a Japanese attack on the airfield. The P-40's failed to prevent bombing but did manage to contest the low-level strafing of the sort which proved so destructive at Clark Field soon after. The radar set at Iba, however, was destroyed in the attack and the 3rd PS decimated.

Visually exposed on a beach and recognizing the increased threat posed by a possible Japanese amphibious landing near their beach position caused them to move the radar inland to a new position atop Palico Hill. This new position offered much greater camouflage. A few days later, three surviving soldiers from the SCR-270 at Iba that was destroyed were dropped off to become part of the radar crew. On 23 December, the detachment was ordered to leave its current position and consolidate with other US Forces on the Bataan Peninsula. Soldiers from the 12th Quartermaster Regiment assisted the Marines in getting their overloaded radar and communications vehicles back over the Tagaytay Ridge. Split up from each other during the course of the convoy, the detachment's vehicles drove through Manila and San Fernando, Pampanga and eventually regrouped in Orani on Christmas Day.

On 26 December, after establishing the radar in a mango grove just west of Limay, they detachment recommenced operations. During this time the detachment was constantly exposed to enemy artillery and air attacks by both fighter and bombers.

From very early on, the Marine radar detachment garnered a reputation for being able to creatively acquire supplies and equipment. They had to become good at scrounging because they detached from their parent Marine command and had never been able to properly obtain the proper supply requisition paperwork. After observing the detachment's ability to live off the land, a new lieutenant sent from the 4th Marine Regiment to provide some additional discipline nicknamed them "The Rouges of Bataan." In early January, members of the detachment discovered an abandoned British ship off the coast near their position and discovered that it was loaded with cases of Johnnie Walker Scotch whisky. The Marines commandeered the ship's radio and all of the scotch which they took back to their position and distributed equally among the detachment. The stolen liquor eventually became known to senior military officers in the local area. Despite the ongoing battle and being surrounded by the Japanese, two of the detachment's Marines were court-martialed by the US Army and reduced in rank.

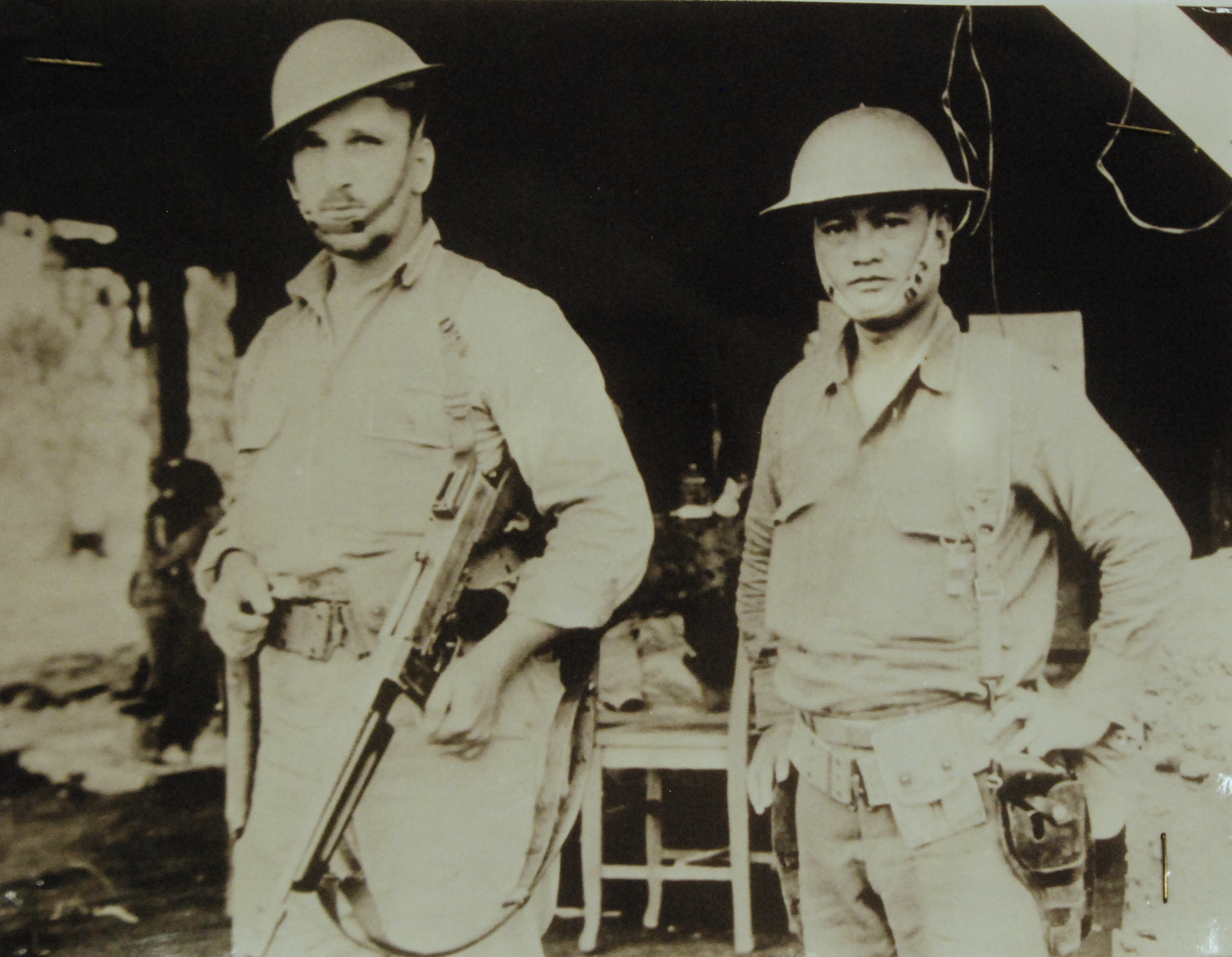
Capt Arthur Wermuth (left) and Filipino aide.

On the evening of 15 January 1942, PFC Robert J. Brown was one of five Marines from the detachment who were permitted to take part in patrols against the Japanese 65th Brigade, planned by US Army Captain Arthur Wermuth, the "One Many Army" of Bataan. After setting a Japanese building on fire, the patrol was ambushed, and PFC Brown was killed while providing cover fire as another wounded Marine was dragged to safety. For his heroic actions he was awarded the Distinguished Service Cross. He was the first, and one of only 31 Marines, to be awarded the Distinguished Service Cross during World War II.

In March 1942, short on gasoline and only operating periodically, the detachment packed up gear and moved to a hidden spot in the jungle on high ground about a mile from Bataan Airfield. The detachment served as part of an early warning system and was linked to headquarters of the 5th Interceptor Command at Mariveles. Takeoffs and landings by the Bataan Field Flying Detachment required towing of P-40s off the runways to and from hidden revetments, and the aircraft were vulnerable to strafing during this time. The ad hoc system facilitated coordination of field operations, and while imperfect, no aircraft were lost during takeoffs or landings. By the first week in April, the radar detachment's usefulness had run its course. There were no more aircraft to provide early warning for as the only aircraft flying were D17 Beechcraft ferrying personnel and equipment to the southern Philippines. The Japanese were very near the detachment's position and the Marines also were suffering from dysentery, dyspepsia, malaria, and malnutrition.

On the afternoon of 8 April, the detachment received orders to break down their radar site and prepare to move to Mariveles to stage for transit to Corregidor. En route to Marivales they encountered an SCR-268 radar detachment from the Army's 200th Coast Artillery in the vicinity of Cabcaben Airfield. They aided the Army personnel in destroying the radar and burning the manuals before they fell into enemy hands. The Marines arrived at Mariveles at 0900 on 9 April to await further orders. During this time, while under constant attack by Japanese aerial interdiction, the detachment successfully burned the radar antenna and pushed the radar vans into Manila Bay. On 9 April, remaining members of the detachment were surrendered alongside other remaining US forces on Bataan.

== Legacy ==
This small detachment of Marines, Sailors, and Soldiers was the first Marine Corps early warning detachment to serve in combat. Because the surviving members of the detachment all became prisoners of war, none of their experiences or after action items filtered back to the Marine Corps to help inform the service as it began to stand up its own formal air warning program.

A total of 36 Marines and soldiers served in this detachment during the course of its existence. 19 of these Marines survived the war. 18 were liberated in Japanese POW camps while one was liberated in Bilibid Prison in Manila. 13 of these Marines did not survive the war. One was killed in action during the Battle of Bataan, 6 died in POW camps in the Philippines, 3 died in POW camps in Japan and four were killed when their prisoner of war ships were sunk by American submarines. The detachment OIC, CWO John Brainard, was killed on 24 October 1944, when the Arisan Maru was torpedoed by the USS Shark (SS-314).

== See also ==
- United States Marine Corps Aviation
- Marine Air Command and Control System
- Marine Corps Early Warning Detachment, Guadalcanal (1942-43)
