= Marine Air Control Group 18 =

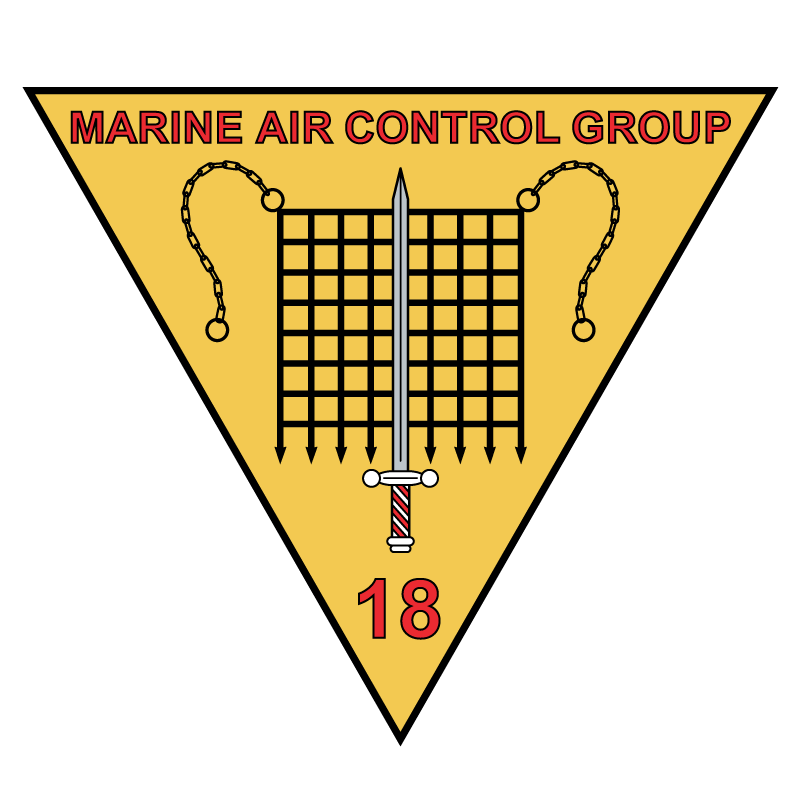
- MACG-18 Insignia
- Active: 8 Jan 1944 – 1 Aug 1945; 1 Sep 1967 - present
- Country: United States
- Allegiance: United States of America
- Branch: United States Marine Corps
- Role: Aviation command & control
- Part of: 1st Marine Aircraft Wing; III Marine Expeditionary Force
- Garrison/HQ: Marine Corps Air Station Futenma
- Nickname: "Pacific Gatekeepers"
- Engagements: Vietnam War Operation Enduring Freedom

Commanders
- Current commander: Colonel Justin M. Sanders
- Notable commanders: Robert O. Bisson; Lorna M. Mahlock

Marine Air Control Group 18 (MACG-18) is a United States Marine Corps aviation command and control unit based at Marine Corps Air Station Futenma that is currently composed of 4 squadrons and 1 HQ support detachment. The Marine Air Control Group as a whole provides the 1st Marine Aircraft Wings tactical headquarters, positive and procedural control, air traffic control, short range air defense and air defense control to aircraft for the III Marine Expeditionary Force.

== Mission ==
Provide the 1st Marine Aircraft Wing Command, Control, and Communications support for the prosecution of all six functions of Marine Aviation.

== Subordinate units ==
- 1st LAAD Battalion
- Marine Air Control Squadron 4
- Marine Air Support Squadron 2
- Marine Wing Communications Squadron 18
- Personnel Support Detachment 18

== History ==
=== World War II ===
Marine Air Warning Group 2 was commissioned on 8 January 1944 at Marine Corps Air Depot Miramar, California. The Group's mission was to make available Air Warning Squadrons for combat and to store and maintain air warning equipment until assigned to air warning squadrons going overseas. Most of the leadership in the air warning squadrons was new to the Marine Corps with most time spent learning the details of their highly technical equipment. Thus the majority of the responsibility for embarking squadrons on their way to combat fell on the Group Headquarters. Squadrons received their gear and final training while attached to MACG-2. This usually took place during a six week field evolution during which they also practiced landing operations. Eleven air warning squadrons trained and deployed from MAWG-2. The group was decommissioned on 1 August 1945.

=== 1967-present ===
The group was reformed on 1 September 1967 in Danang, Vietnam as Marine Air Control Group 18 at the height of US participation in the Vietnam War. At that time the Group's component units were already involved in combat. Its Hawk battalion was among the first US Marine units to land in Vietnam. From its formation, MACG-18 and subordinated units, with attachments scattered throughout the I Corps Tactical Zone, participated in every major campaign conducted in the northern area of South Vietnam until its departure from Vietnam. In recognition of their accomplishments during the Vietnam War, MACG-18 and its units were awarded four Presidential Unit Citations, three Navy Unit Commendations and a Meritorious Unit Commendation. The Group moved from Vietnam to Marine Corps Air Station Iwakuni, Japan in 1971, and then to the Marine Corps Air Station Futenma, Okinawa, Japan, in 1975. Since the end of the war in Vietnam, MACG-18 has assumed a major role in joint, combined and Marine air-ground training and contingency operation in the Western Pacific.

== Unit awards ==
A unit citation or commendation is an award bestowed upon an organization for the action cited. Members of the unit who participated in said actions are allowed to wear on their uniforms the awarded unit citation. MACG-18 has been presented with the following awards:

Streamer	Award	Year(s)	Additional Info
	Presidential Unit Citation Streamer	1967	Vietnam
	Navy Unit Commendation Streamer	1967-1968	Vietnam
	Meritorious Unit Commendation Streamer with four Bronze Stars	1982-1984, 1985-1987, 1997-1999, 2000-2002, 2004-2005	
	American Campaign Streamer		
	World War II Victory Streamer	1941–1945	Pacific War
	National Defense Service Streamer with two Bronze Stars	1961–1974, 1990–1995, 2001–present	Vietnam War, Gulf War, war on terrorism
	Vietnam Service Streamer with two Silver Stars		
A blue streamer with yellow, red, and white horizontal stripes	Global War on Terrorism Service Streamer	2001–present	
	Vietnam Gallantry Cross with Palm Streamer	1965–1971	
	Vietnam Meritorious Unit Citation Civil Actions Streamer	1965–1971	

== See also ==
- List of United States Marine Corps aircraft groups
- List of United States Marine Corps aircraft squadrons
