= VMF(N)-531 GCI Detachment =

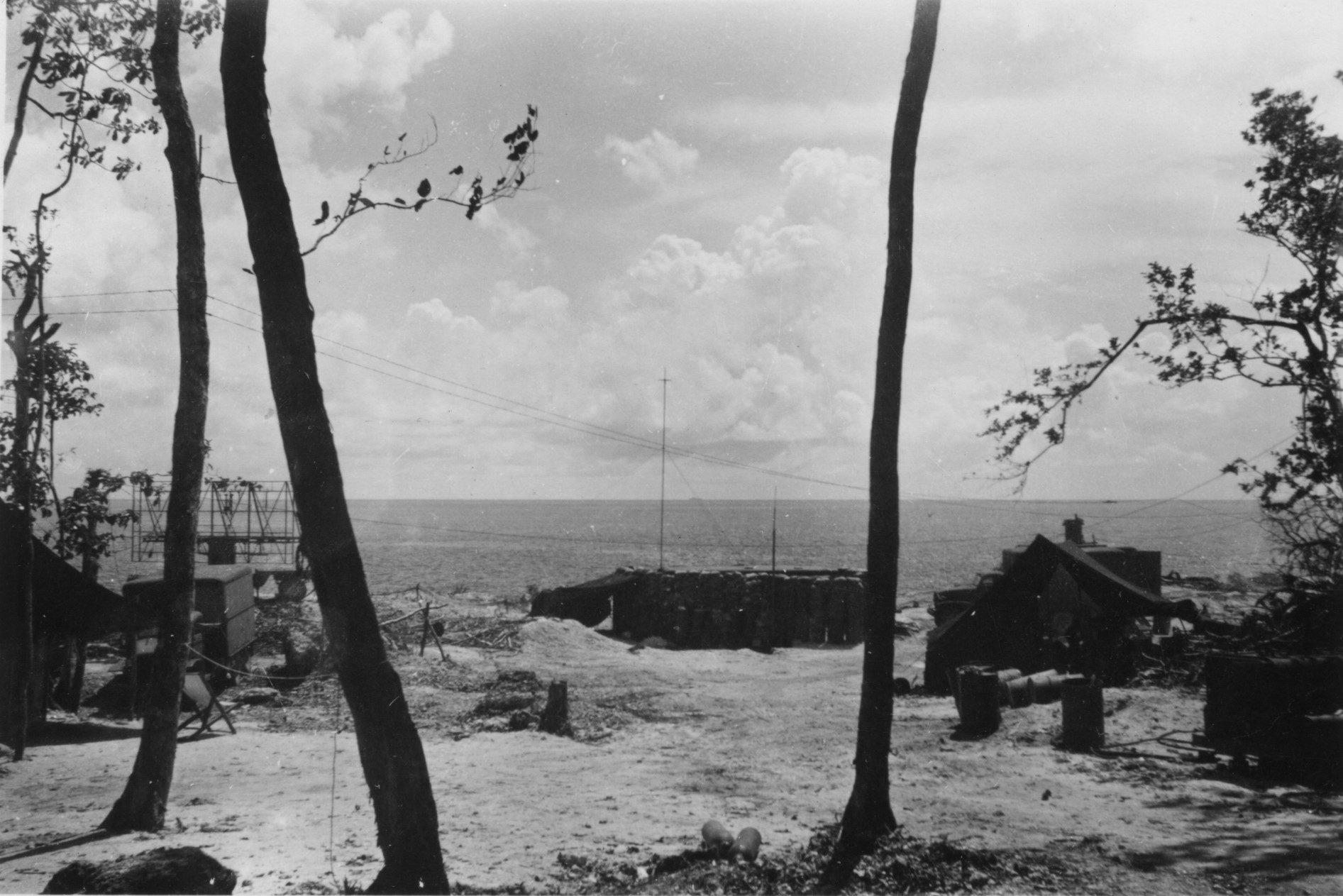
- VMF(N)-531 GCI Detachment's SCR-527 on Stirling Island in early 1944
- Active: 16 Nov 1942 – 3 Sep 1944
- Country: United States
- Allegiance: United States of America
- Branch: United States Marine Corps
- Role: Ground-controlled interception Early warning
- Part of: N/A
- Engagements: World War II

Commanders
- Notable commanders: LtCol Robert O. Bisson

The VMF(N)-531 GCI Detachment was a short-lived aviation command and control unit that was part of the United States Marine Corps's first night fighter squadron, VMF(N)-531. This detachment was the Marine Corps' first dedicated GCI detachment utilized in a combat zone. In the early phases of World War II the Marine Corps did not have stand-alone early warning and ground-controlled intercept (GCI) units so these capabilities were initially placed in the headquarters of each Marine Aircraft Group and with individual night fighter squadrons. The detachment was deployed in the South Pacific from August 1943 through August 1944 and was responsible for the interception of numerous Japanese aircraft. Lessons learned from this deployment were instrumental in establishing tactics and procedures for the Marine Corps' newly established Air Warning Program. Upon returning from its first and only deployment, the detachment was dissolved and its members went on to serve as instructors at the 1st Marine Air Warning Group, which was responsible for training new squadrons. Many of them later served in leadership roles in these Air Warning Squadrons as they supported follow on combat operations.

== History ==
=== Background ===
On 20 January 1942, then Captain Ralph E. Davison, was serving as the Assistant Chief of the U.S. Navy Bureau of Aeronautics when he committed the Marines to developing a night fighter program when he wrote, "The job of the Marines was to seize a beachhead and hold it until replaced by the Army. To do this successfully night fighters would be an absolute necessity." Initial Marine Corps projections envisioned the first night fighter units coming online at the beginning of 1945. This timeline was quickly accelerated by nearly two years when the Commandant was persuaded to move this up to the first half of 1943. The timeline for the night fighter program moved even faster when reports from the Cactus Air Force operating during the Battle of Guadalcanal highlighted the psychological effects that night nuisance raids were having on the combat efficiency of the Marines.

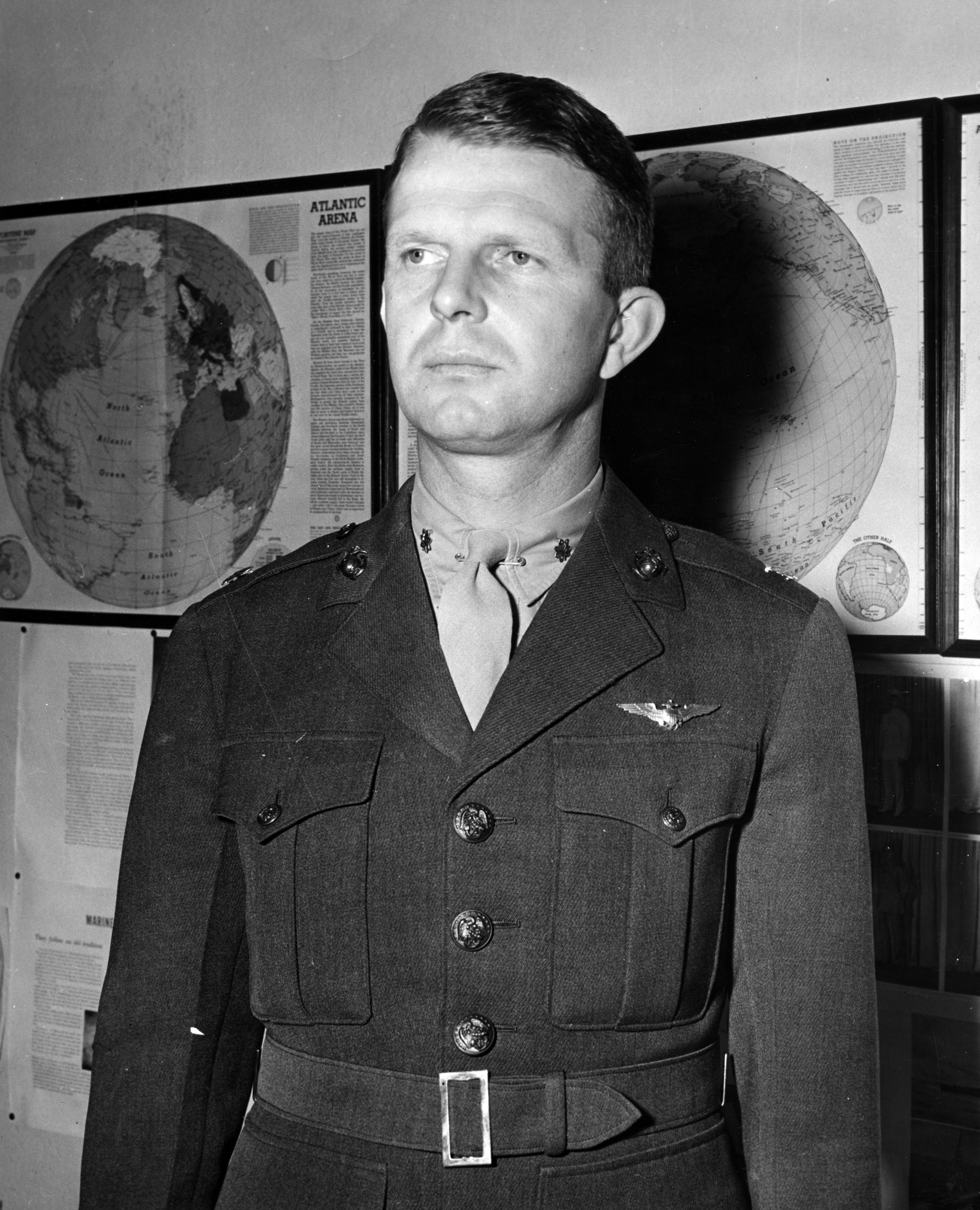
Edward Dyer while working at Headquarters Marine Corps Aviation during World War II.

Before the United States entered World War II, the Marine Corps began sending small contingents of Marines over to England to receive training on new technologies such as radar, night fighters, Identification friend or foe (IFF) and Plan position indicator (PPI) while also observing the tactics and techniques of the British air defense system in action against the Luftwaffe. These Marines were tasked with learning as much as possible and determining what could be brought back and utilized by the Marine Corps in the coming war. Among those first Marines sent to England were Captain Edward C. Dyer and Major Frank Schwable. Dyer had been tasked to learn about the Royal Air Force's radars and methods of fighter direction. His report to the Commandant of the Marine Corps upon his return led to Schwable's travelling to England to learn everything he could on the organization and operation of night fighters.

After Dyer and Schwable returned from their training mission in England in May 1942 they began working with Headquarters Marine Corps Aviation and the Navy's Bureau of Aeronautics to build the Marine Corps night fighter program. The aggressive timeline that the Marines were driving limited the aircraft available to select for the service's first night fighter. The Marine Corps ended up selecting the Lockheed PV-1 Ventura. At the end of July 1943, Major Dyer again wrote to the Director of Aviation asking for the night fighter timeline to be moved up even sooner so that personnel and equipment would begin arriving at Marine Corps Air Station Cherry Point in October 1942.

=== Formation and early training ===
Marine Night Fighter Squadron 531 (VMF(N)-531) was commissioned on 16 November 1942, at Marine Corps Air Station Cherry Point, North Carolina. As -531 struggled to organize administratively, accept aircraft, and begin training as a first of its kind unit in the Marine Corps, it also had to contend with an establishing a tactical ground element responsible for GCI which existed in no other Marine Corps squadron. The unit's formation was hampered by slow aircraft delivery, poor VHF radios, uncalibrated radars and an inconsistent electrical system on the aircraft. Good news arrived on 19 December 1942, when Lt William D. Felder arrived from the Army Air Forces School of Applied Tactics at Camp Murphy, Florida as the squadron's first schoolhouse trained GCI controller. The next day the first set of non-portable GCI equipment arrived at MCAS Cherry Point marking the beginning of "Project 88." Project 88 was the nickname given to the Marine Corps's program to train its own GCI controllers and operators at MCAS Cherry Point. The name "88" was derived from the SCR-588 that was used for training. The SCR-588 was an immobile, Americanized version of the British Chain Home Low radars that VMF(N)-531 personnel trained on prior to receiving deployable radars.

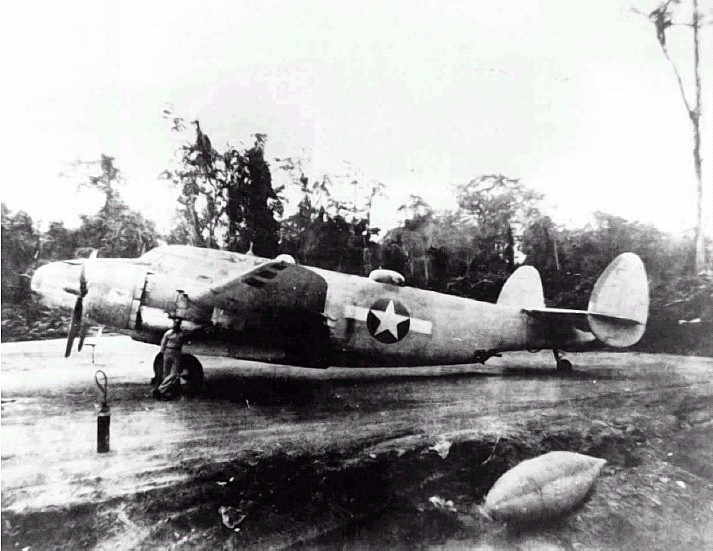
A Lockheed PV-1 Ventura night fighter from VMF(N)-531 in the Southwest Pacific in 1943.

In February 1943 the squadron sent nine pilots, including Marion M. Magruder, to England to learn night fighting from the Royal Air Force. The nascent GCI section was able to conduct its first actual intercept on 27 February. February 1943 also saw Major Robert O. Bisson, recently trained in electrical engineering and radar at the United States Army's Signal Corps School at Fort Monmouth and Harvard University, arrive to lead the newly formed GCI Detachment. In March 1943, Bisson and four enlisted men were sent on temporary duty to General Electric in Syracuse, New York, to receive instruction on the SCR-527 early warning radar. This newly fielded radar is what VMF(N)-531 took into combat later that year. For the remainder of its time at MCAS Cherry Point, the detachment continued to train despite being plagued by poor equipment and facilities.

On 7 May 1943, the GCI Det separated from the squadron's main body and departed MCAS Cherry Point headed west for San Diego. At Marine Corps Air Depot Miramar the detachment received a new SCR-527 radar plus additional personnel. On 14 June, the detachment convoyed out to Marine Corps Air Station El Centro for six weeks of training on radar problems in the California desert. After returning to San Diego, the 32 man radar detachment departed California on 31 July on board the USS Hammondsport (AKV-2).

=== Deployment to the South Pacific ===
The detachment arrived at Espiritu Santo in September 1943. After initial staging and acclimatization, the detachment departed Espiritu Santo on 9 October onboard LST-395 bound for Vella Lavella. While on the way, they picked up the remainder of the radar detachment on Guadalcanal. The detachment's gear was initially set up near Liapari Point however the position was untenable for controlling due to local terrain interference. It was not until 18 October that the squadron's pilots were able to work with their own GCI section during night patrols. On 25 October the GCI Detachment moved again, this time to Pakoi Bay in the northwest part of Vella Lavella and again began nighttime GCI controls using the callsign "Moon." A few days later on 31 October, two controllers from the GCI detachment controlled the first dedicated kill by a night fighter in the Pacific. They led an intercept by an F4U-2 Corsiar from the U.S. Navy's VF(N)-75. The squadron's first successful ground controlled intercept of a Japanese aircraft utilizing the squadron's own aircraft occurred on 6 December 1943, when Captain Owen M. Hines vectored one of the squadron's PV-1s against a Japanese boat plane near Motupina Point on Bougainville.

On 18 January 1944, the radars were repositioned to Stirling Island in the Treasury Islands. From there they also sent out a smaller radar detachment of 16 personnel to Green Island on 27 January to support the Allied landings.

Personnel from VMF(N)-531, to include the GCI detachment rotated back to the United States in four different echelons between May and August 1944. The final echelon of the squadrons arrived back in San Francisco, California on 3 September 1944, where the squadron was disbanded that same day by verbal orders received from Headquarters Marine Corps.

== Legacy & Leadership ==
VMF(N)-531's GCI Detachment was the first dedicated GCI unit to deploy in support of the Fleet Marine Force. Earlier Marine Corps radar detachments in Iceland, the Philippines, and Guadalcanal had been utilized primarily for early warning. Lessons learned from this detachment helped inform the Marine Corps new Air Warning Program as it was standing up in 1943/44. These lessons learned also led to the recommendation that all early warning and GCI radars be consolidated in the new air warning squadrons. Attaching them to the individual squadrons limited that unit's tactical mobility and did not account for when more than one squadron would be operating in an area at the same time. There was an early recognition that radar units needed to operate as part of a larger system to ensure robust coverage, defense in depth, joint integration, and standardized tactics, techniques and procedures.

During the course of its 1943-44 deployment, the VMF(N)-531 GCI Detachment pioneered the use of the SCR-527 over water. The radar was built for detecting aircraft over land and it was originally believed that tidal variations and waves made the radar sub-optimal for tracking in this environment. After a great deal of experimentation the detachment created calibration tables that accounted for tidal variation that proved the radar had excellent performance over water. The detachment also established the need for GCI Detachments to land during D-Day of any future amphibious operation in order to provide necessary nighttime protection for newly established beachheads. The Green Island detachment had gone ashore on D-Day and the next evening controlled night fighters that broke up two Japanese air raids.

The OIC of this detachment, LtCol Robert O. Bisson later served as the Commanding Officer of Marine Aircraft Group 43, the headquarters responsible for overseeing all land based radar units during the Battle of Okinawa. The squadron's first GCI, controller, Captain William D. Felder, became the first commanding officer of Air Warning Squadron 1 (AWS) which was the first AWS deployed overseas at Engebi in February 1944.

== See also ==
- United States Marine Corps Aviation
- Marine Air Command and Control System
