= Marine Wing Communications Squadron 18 =

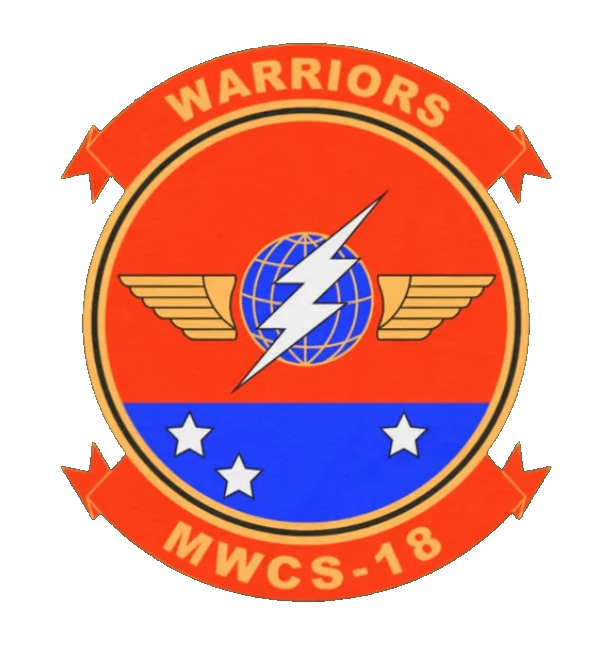
- MWCS-18 Insignia
- Active: 1 September 1967 – present
- Country: United States
- Allegiance: United States of America
- Branch: United States Marine Corps
- Type: Aviation Command & Control
- Role: Communications
- Part of: Marine Air Control Group 18; 1st Marine Aircraft Wing
- Garrison/HQ: MCB Camp Foster
- Nickname(s): MWCS-18
- Motto(s): "Warriors from the Ground Up"
- Engagements: Vietnam War; Operation Enduring Freedom

Commanders
- Current commander: LtCol Benjamin Tuck

Marine Wing Communications Squadron 18 (MWCS-18) is a United States Marine Corps communications squadron. The squadron provides expeditionary communications for the aviation combat element of the III Marine Expeditionary Force. They are based at MCB Camp Foster and fall under the command of Marine Air Control Group 18 and the 1st Marine Aircraft Wing. Although a subordinate squadron of MACG-18, MWCS-18 is considered a 1st MAW asset and therefore serves to augment the entire 1st Marine Air Wing with communications support.

== Mission ==
Provide expeditionary communications for the deployed Aviation Combat Element (ACE) and Command Element (CE) of the Marine Expeditionary Force (MEF) and its supporting Marine Air Command and Control System (MACCS) including the phased deployment of task-organized elements thereof.

== Components ==
~Alpha Company

- Wire – Telephone Switching and Cabling
- Terrestrial- Ground Communications i.e. AN/TRC-170/MRC-142
- Cyber- Cyber Network Operations
- Transmissions- Radio and Satellite Communications
- HQ- Administration, Training and Operations

~Bravo Company

- Network/Data Communications - Provides tactical, automated switching, and telephone services for the aviation combat element within 1st MAW, and Tactical Air Command Center (TACC)
- Transmissions - Radio and Satellite Communications
- Headquarters - Administration, Training and Operations

~Headquarters and Support

- Supply- Issues supplies*'S' Shops- Maintain Operations
- EM- Electronic Maintenance Platoon
- MT/UT- Motor Transport i.e. vehicular maintenance/Utilities (i.e. power, heating, and cooling)

== Tasks ==
- Provide for the effective command of subordinate elements.
- Assist in the systems planning and engineering of ACE communications; and install, operate, and maintain expeditionary communications for command and control of the MEF ACE.
- Provide operational System Control Centers, as required, to coordinate communication functions internally and externally to the ACE.
- Provide collaboration and repair facility for all ground common Test Measurement Diagnostic Equipment (TMDE) in the Marine Aircraft Wing (MAW).
- Provide maintenance support for Ground Common Communications Equipment in the MAW.
- Provide the digital backbone communications support for the ACE Command Element (CE), forward operating bases, and Marine Air Command and Control System (MACCS) agencies for up to two airfields per detachment.
- Provide tactical, automated switching, and telephone services for the ACE CE, and Tactical Air Command Center (TACC).
- Provide electronic message distribution for the ACE CE, primary MACCS agencies, and tenant units.
- Provide external, single-channel radio and radio retransmission communications support for ACE operations, as required.
- Provide deployed Wide Area Network, and deployed Local Area Network server support for the ACE CE, and primary MACCS agencies.
- Provide the Support Cryptographic Site (SCS), for all Ground Common and MACCS assigned Communication Security Equipment within the ACE.
- Plan and coordinate individual and unit training, as required to qualify subordinate detachments for tactical deployment and combat operations.

== History ==
Marine Wing Communication Squadron 18 (MWCS-18) was activated 1 September 1967 at Danang, Republic of Vietnam, as Marine Wing Communications Squadron 1 (MWCS-1), Marine Wing Headquarters Group 1, 1st Marine Aircraft Wing. The squadron was redesignated as Marine Wing Communications Squadron 38 on July 1, 1971.

== Gallery ==
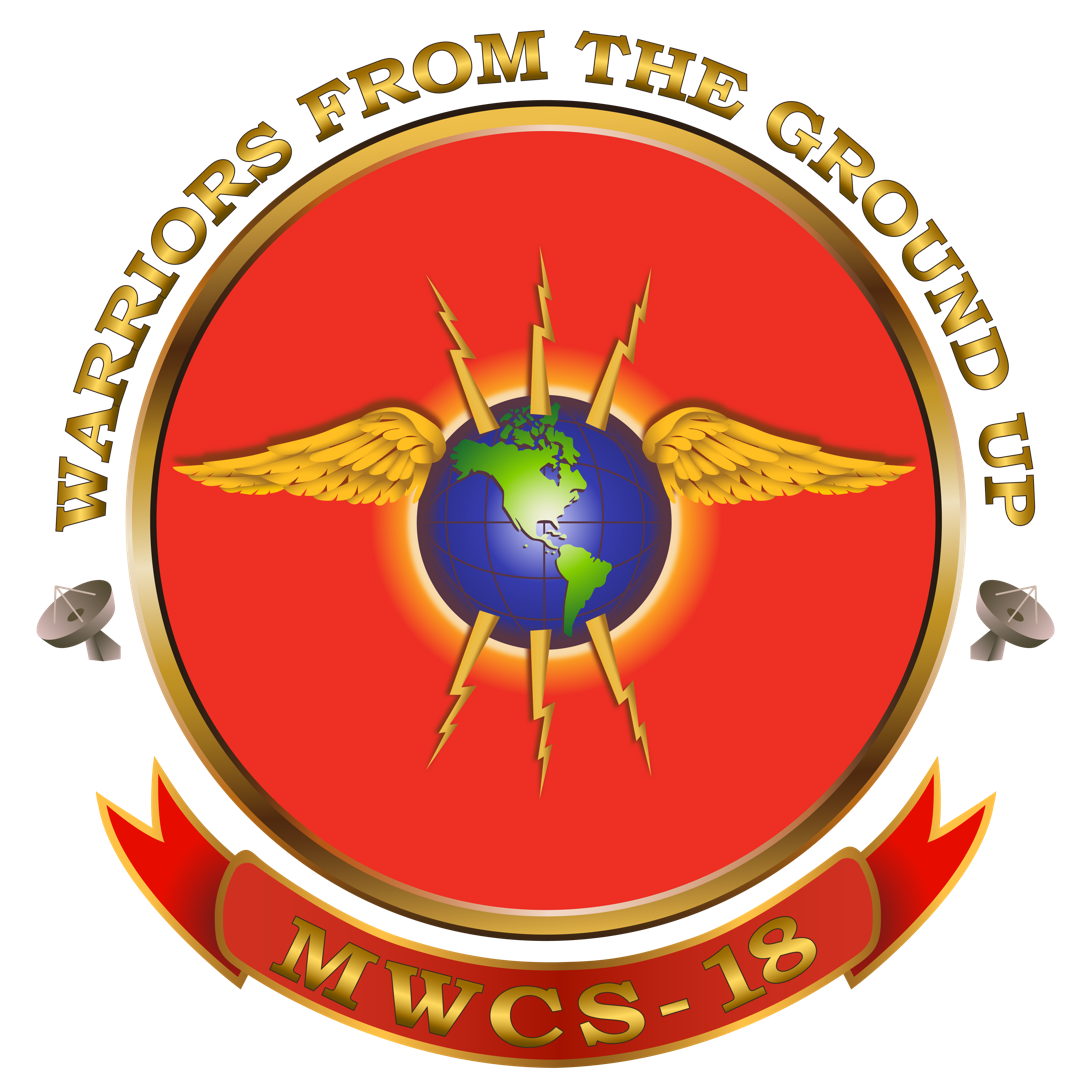
Old MWCS-18 logo

== See also ==
- United States Marine Corps Aviation
- Organization of the United States Marine Corps
- List of United States Marine Corps aviation support units
