= 1st Low Altitude Air Defense Battalion =

1st Low Altitude Aircraft Battalion
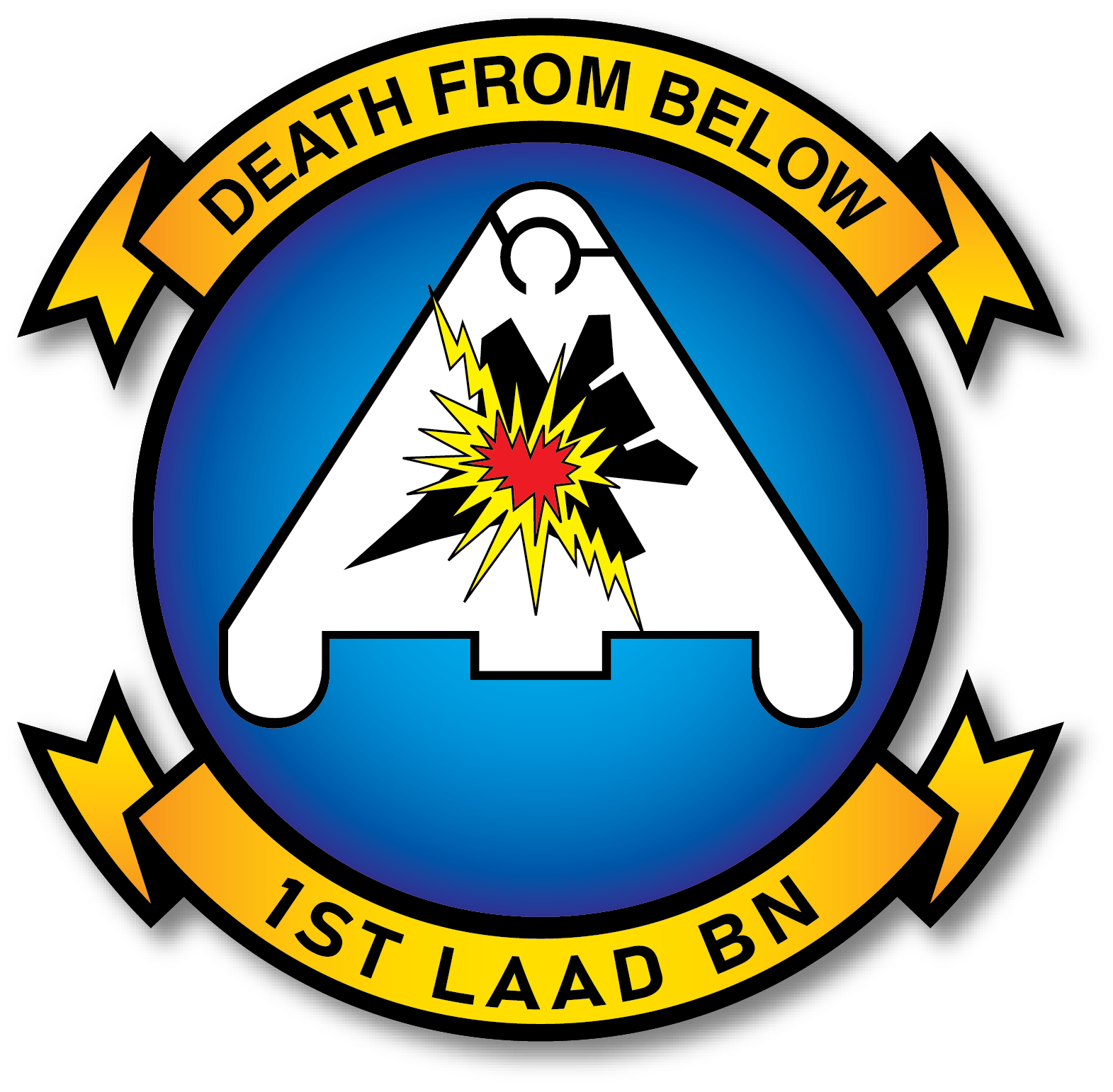
- 1st LAAD Battalion Insignia
- Active: 1 July 1982 — 28 September 2007; 31 August 2023 — present
- Country: United States of America
- Branch: United States Marine Corps
- Type: Low-Altitude Air Defense
- Role: Air defense
- Part of: Marine Air Control Group 18; 1st Marine Aircraft Wing
- Garrison/HQ: Marine Corps Air Station Kaneohe Bay
- Motto: "Death from Below"
- Engagements: Operation Desert Storm; Operation Iraqi Freedom

Commanders
- Current commander: LtCol Douglas Columbus

The 1st Low Altitude Air Defense Battalion is an air defense unit of the United States Marine Corps. It is part of Marine Air Control Group 18 (MACG-18) and the 1st Marine Aircraft Wing (1st MAW) and is based at Marine Corps Air Station Kaneohe Bay, Hawaii. The battery was decommissioned on 28 September 2007 and reactivated on 31 August 2023.

== Mission ==
To provide close-in, low altitude, surface-to-air weapons fires in defense of Marine Air-Ground Task Force (MAGTF) assets defending forward combat areas, maneuver forces, vital areas, installations, and/or units engaged in special/independent operations.

== History ==
=== 1982 through 2007 ===
1st Stinger Battery was initially activated on 1 July 1982, at Marine Corps Air Station, Futenma, Okinawa, Japan as 1st Forward Area Air Defense (FAAD) Battery, Marine Air Control Group 18, 1st Marine Aircraft Wing. Employing the Redeye missile and the newly fielded Stinger missile, the battery participated in numerous exercises throughout the Pacific Rim.

On 1 October 1986, the Battery was redesignated as 1st Low Altitude Air Defense (LAAD) Battalion. The battalion consisted of two firing batteries and a headquarters and service battery. During Operation Desert Storm, 1st LAAD Battalion deployed a Platoon (-) in the defense of Al Jabal Airfield.

On 14 May 1993, 1st LAAD Battalion was reduced in size and redesignated as 1st Stinger Battery. The Battery consists of two firing platoons and a headquarters and service platoon. In January 1996, the Battery fielded the Avenger Weapon System, increasing its firepower and targeting capabilities. Over the next several months, the Avengers and man-portable air defense system (MANPADS) vehicles will be phased-out and replaced with the Advanced-MANPADS.

1st Stinger Battery was the only Marine ground-based air defense unit within the III Marine Expeditionary Force. The Battery maintained an aggressive training program and operational tempo as its Marines supported exercises within the Western Pacific and operations with the 31st Marine Expeditionary Unit. On 7 December 2006, Headquarters Marine Corps released a message stating that 1st Stinger would be deactivated during 2007. In early February 2007, 1st Stinger battery Marines deployed for the first time in support of Operation Iraqi Freedom. The battery's mission was to provide airbase security while in Iraq for the next seven months. The battery returned to Okinawa in August 2007 and on 28 September 2007, 1st Stinger Battery was decommissioned at a ceremony at MCAS Futenma.

=== Unit Deployment Program ===
Beginning in the Summer of 2013, Marine Corps low altitude air defense returned to III Marine Expeditionary Force in the form of rotations of LAAD Marines from the remaining CONUS Battalions, 2nd LAAD Battalion and 3rd LAAD Battalion, as part of the resumption of the Unit Deployment Program. Attached to Marine Air Support Squadron 2, LAAD UDP Detachments support III MEF operational requirements for exercises and operations within the PACOM AOR as III MEF's only organic ground based air defense asset in theater.

=== Reactivation ===
1st LAAD Battalion was reactivated on 31 August 2023 in order to increase the Marine Corps air defense footprint in the Pacific as part of the Marine Corps' Force Design 2030 initiative.

== See also ==
- List of United States Marine Corps aviation support units
- History of ground based air defense in the United States Marine Corps
