= List of United States Marine Corps air support squadrons =

This is a list of the current and decommissioned air support squadrons in the United States Marine Corps that provide the Marine Direct Air Support Center for the Marine Air-Ground Task Force.

== Current ==
| Official Name | Insignia | Headquarters | Ref |
|---|---|---|---|
| Marine Air Support Squadron 1 | | Marine Corps Air Station Cherry Point, North Carolina | |
| Marine Air Support Squadron 2 | | Marine Corps Air Station Futenma, Okinawa, Japan | |
| Marine Air Support Squadron 3 | | Marine Corps Base Camp Pendleton, California | |
| Marine Air Support Squadron 6 | | Westover Air Reserve Base, Massachusetts | |

== Decommissioned ==
| Official Name | Insignia | Headquarters | Ref |
|---|---|---|---|
| Marine Air Support Squadron 4 | | Naval Air Station Los Alamitos, California | |
| Marine Air Support Squadron 5 | | Marine Corps Air Station El Toro, California | |
