= Marine Air Support Squadron 3 =

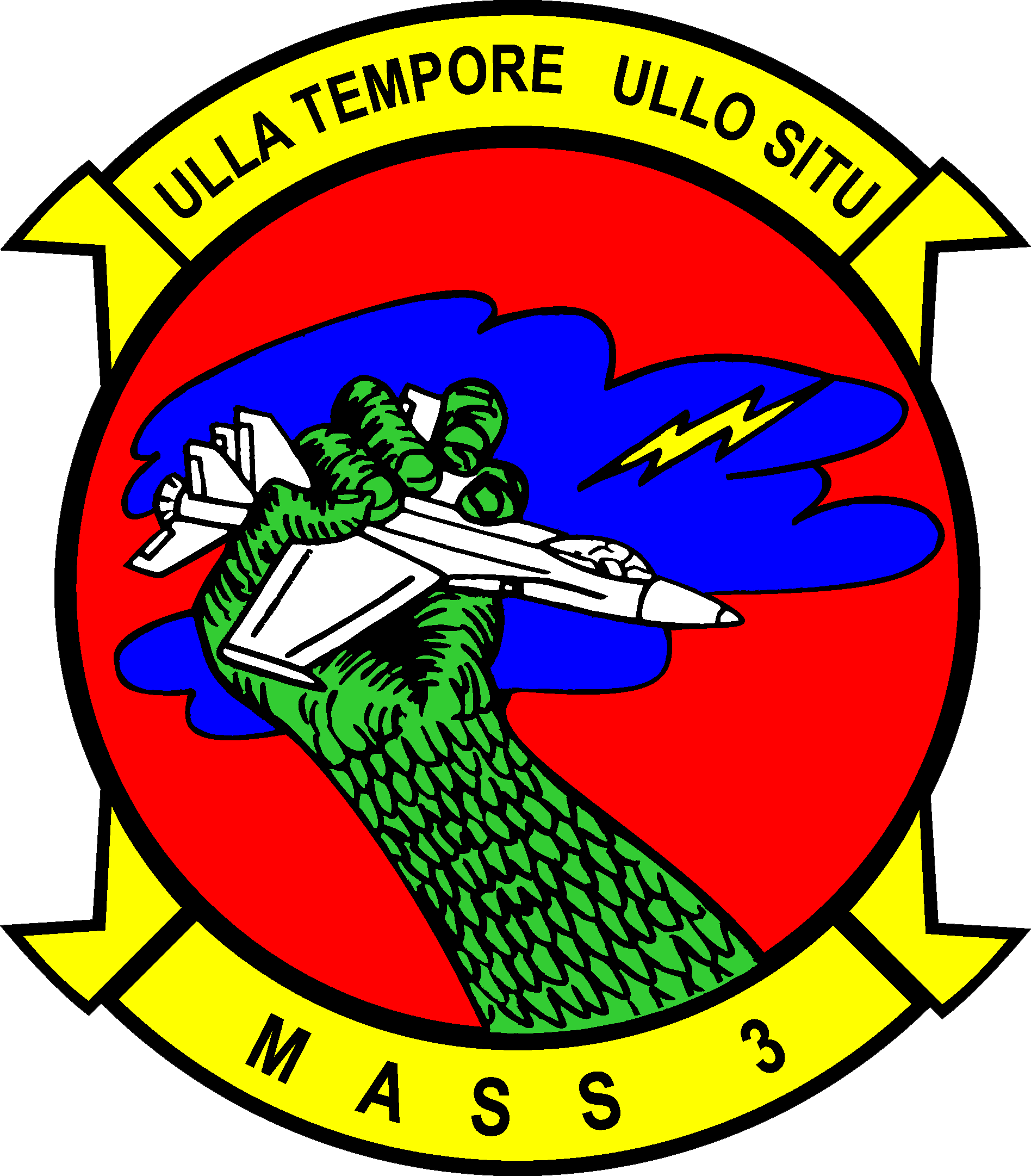
- MASS-3 insignia
- Active: 3 August 1950–present
- Country: United States of America
- Branch: United States Marine Corps
- Type: Aviation command and control
- Role: Provide the DASC
- Part of: Marine Air Control Group 38; 3rd Marine Aircraft Wing
- Garrison/HQ: Marine Corps Base Camp Pendleton
- Nicknames: "Blacklist" "Landshark" (Vietnam)
- Mottos: Ulla Tempore, Ullo Situ "Any time, Any place"
- Engagements: Vietnam War * Battle of Khe Sahn; Operation Desert Storm; Operation Iraqi Freedom * 2003 invasion of Iraq; Operation Enduring Freedom

Commanders
- Current commander: LtCol Corey Belton

Marine Air Support Squadron 3 (MASS-3), is a United States Marine Corps aviation command and control unit that provides the Direct Air Support Center (DASC) for the 1st Marine Expeditionary Force. They are based out of the 32 Area on Marine Corps Base Camp Pendleton, California and fall under the command of Marine Air Control Group 38 and the 3rd Marine Aircraft Wing.

== Mission ==
Provide Direct Air Support Center (DASC) and DASC-Airborne capabilities for control and coordination of aircraft operating in direct support of Marine Air-Ground Task Force (MAGTF) Operations."

Role of DASC: Process immediate air support requests, integrate aircraft with supporting arms, manage terminal control assets and procedurally control aircraft.

== History ==
=== Early years ===
Marine Tactical Air Control Squadron 3 (MTACS-3) was commissioned on 3 August 1950 under Marine Air Control Group 2 and the 1st Marine Aircraft Wing. On 28 March 1951 the squadron moved under the command of Marine Air Control Group 3 (MACG-3). From 22 to 24 May 1951, communications Marines from MTACS-3 assisted in the search for a missing Orange County girl. The squadron coordinated with Marine helicopter squadrons that were also participating in the search. In 1952 the squadron took part in SATEX, AMLEX-1, AIRLEX-1, PHIBEX-1 and Div FEX 1.

The original Marine Air Support Squadron was composed of a Direct Air Support Center, and two Air Support Radar Teams (ASRTs). A third Air Support Radar Team was added in 1961. The squadron utilized the AN/TSQ-122 Direct Air Support Central. The AN/TSQ-122 was a large control system housed in a rigid fiberglass modular structure. To provide an echelon capability, the MASS squadron also operated and maintained the AN/UYQ-3 air/mobile DASC. The AN/UYQ-3 operated in a modified KC-130 aircraft, as well as on the back of a 2.5 short tons (2.3 t) truck. Together, the Marine Air Support Squadron was capable of supporting the full range of MAGTFs, up to and including a Marine Amphibious Force (MAF).

They received their current designation of Marine Air Support Squadron 3 on 15 February 1954. In October 1962, MASS-3 deployed to the Caribbean during the Cuban Missile Crisis but in December of that year were relocated to Marine Corps Air Station El Toro.

=== Vietnam War ===
See "History" under Direct Air Support Center.

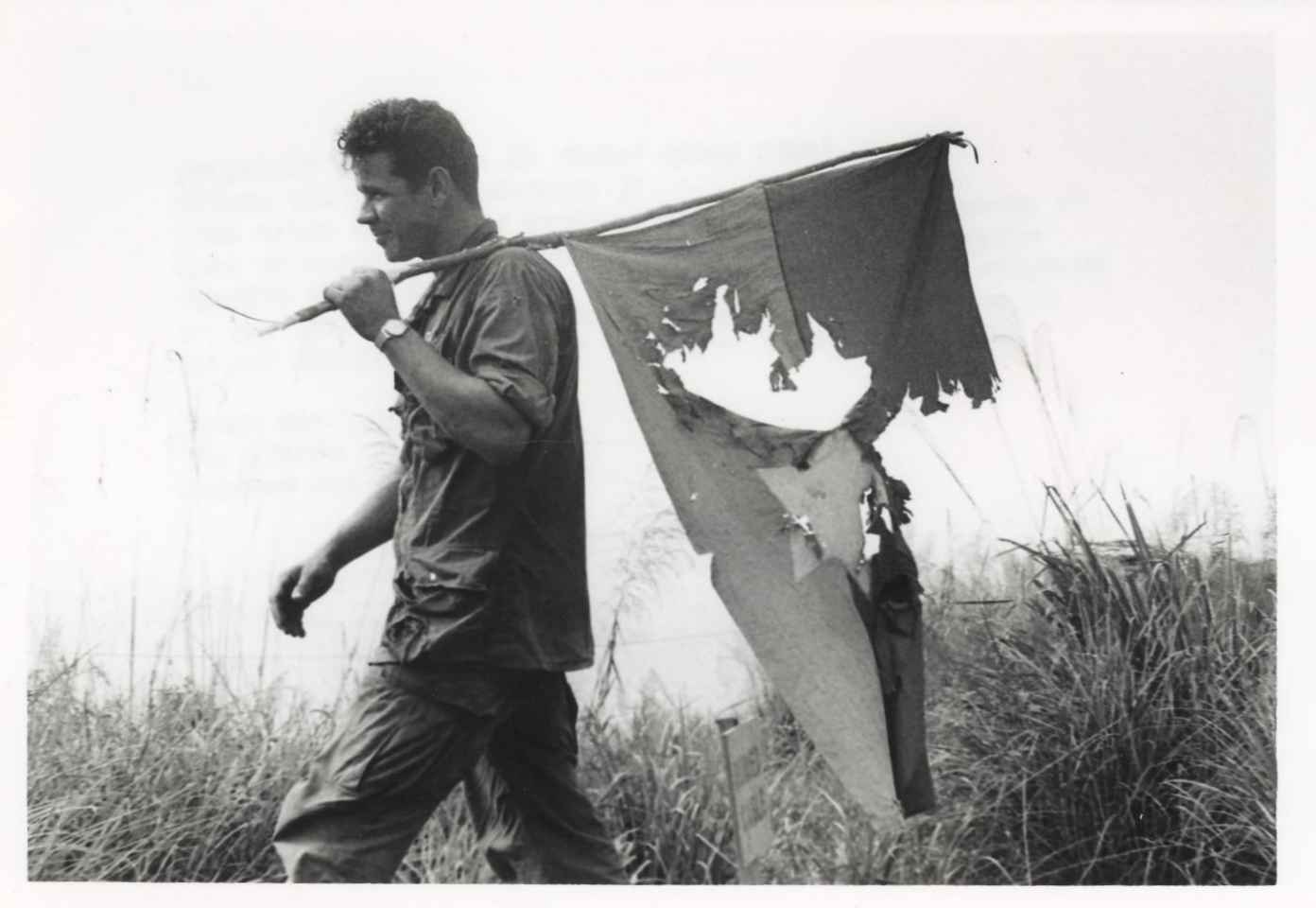
Sergeant Howard J. Johnson, with MASS-3 Det A, strolls along with what's left of an enemy flag he captured when an estimated 40 enemy attacked his unit's position four miles west of Da Nang.

MASS-3 entered Vietnam on 10 November 1966 when they disembarked from the USS Jennings County (LST-846) at Chu Lai. They remained in country until June 1971. On 16 and 17 January 1968, Air Support Radar Team B (ASRT-B) from MASS-3 displaced from Chu Lai to Khe Sanh to handle ground controlled radar bombing missions. On 20 January the DASC was brought into Khe Sahn as well.

During their time in Vietnam, MASS-3 Air Support Radar Teams controlled more than 38,010 AN/TPQ-10 missions, directing more than 121,000 short tons (110,000 t) of ordnance on 56,753 targets. They operated from Chu Lai and Da Nang during this time.

=== The 1980s and 1990s ===
In May 1980, MASS-3 again relocated, this time to Marine Corps Base Camp Pendleton. During this time the squadron undertook an extensive schedule of joint service and multi-national exercises in addition to the regular complement of Marine Corps exercises. Some of these exercises included Bright Star (Egypt), Freedom Banner (South Korea), Blue Flag (Nevada), Display Determination (Turkey) and Gallant Eagle (California). During this time MASS-3 also acquired new equipment and refined employment techniques. In December 1984, MASS-3 took delivery of the AN/TPB-1D, an upgraded radar guidance system used to direct close air support aircraft to deliver ordnance both day and night in all-weather conditions. In April 1988, the squadron received the AN/TSQ-155 Improved DASC and its associated radio van, the OE-334.

Iraq's August 1990 invasion of Kuwait set off hostilities throughout Southwest Asia. Because of this on 21 August 1990 the first elements of MASS-3 began arriving into Saudi Arabia. The squadron commenced operations coordinating joint and coalition air support on 28 August at the Jubail Naval Airfield. MASS-3 provided a Corps-level DASC co-located with the I Marine Expeditionary Force and two Air Support Elements (ASE) to support the 1st and 2nd Marine Divisions. During the course of Operations Desert Shield/Desert Storm, MASS-3's DASC and ASE were operational for 4450 hours controlling 7359 fixed wing and 3065 rotary wing missions. They also processed 995 tactical air requests, 141 assault support requests and 180 MEDEVACs. The squadron's participation in combat operations culminated on 7 March 1991 when the DASC and ASEs safely returned to Jubail Naval Airfield. The squadron returned to MCB Camp Pendleton on 17 March 1991 and immediately commenced its normally training schedule.

=== Operation Iraqi Freedom ===
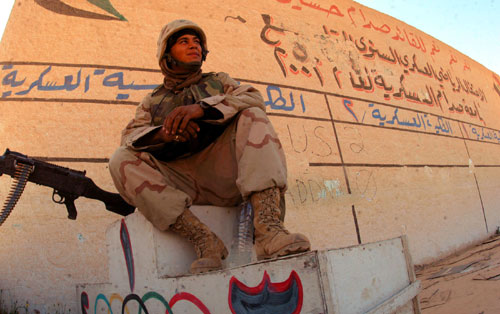
IRAQ – Lance Cpl. John A. Marcogliese of MASS-3 stands guard at one of several Olympic stadiums in Baghdad during the 2003 invasion of Iraq.

MASS 3 began sending units to Kuwait in October 2002 as part of the troop build-up for what would become Operation Iraqi Freedom. MASS-3 provided air support for the 1st Marine Division from the Kuwaiti border to Tikrit and had units remain in country until the division redeployed in October 2003.

MASS-3 returned to Iraq in January 2004 again providing air support for the 1st Marine Division during operations throughout Al Anbar Province. The squadron's initial lay down had the main DASC established at Camp Blue Diamond in Ramadi and an Air Support Element tasked to support 3rd Battalion, 7th Marines in the vicinity of Al-Qa'im. Air Support Liaison Teams were also attached to Regimental Combat Teams 1 and 7. Later in 2004 the squadron sent a detachment of Marines to serve as liaisons on board the E-8 Joint STARS flying in support of I MEF operations. In November 2004, the squadron formed an additional Air Support Liaison Team to co-locate with the 1st Marine Division at Camp Fallujah in order to provide additional support for the Second Battle of Fallujah. During the battle the squadron coordinated 875 CASEVACSs, 491 MEDEVACS, 1856 joint tactical air requests. The squadron was replaced by Marine Air Support Squadron 1 returning to MCB Camp Pendleton in February 2005.

=== Operation Enduring Freedom ===
In April 2010, MASS-3 deployed to Afghanistan for the first time in support of Operation Enduring Freedom. They supported combat operations in support of I MEF for a year while aboard Camp Leatherneck. Subordinate elements included an Air Support Element (ASE) at Camp Dwyer and an Air Support Liaison Team (ASLT) at Main Operating Base Lashkar Gah.

== Gallery ==
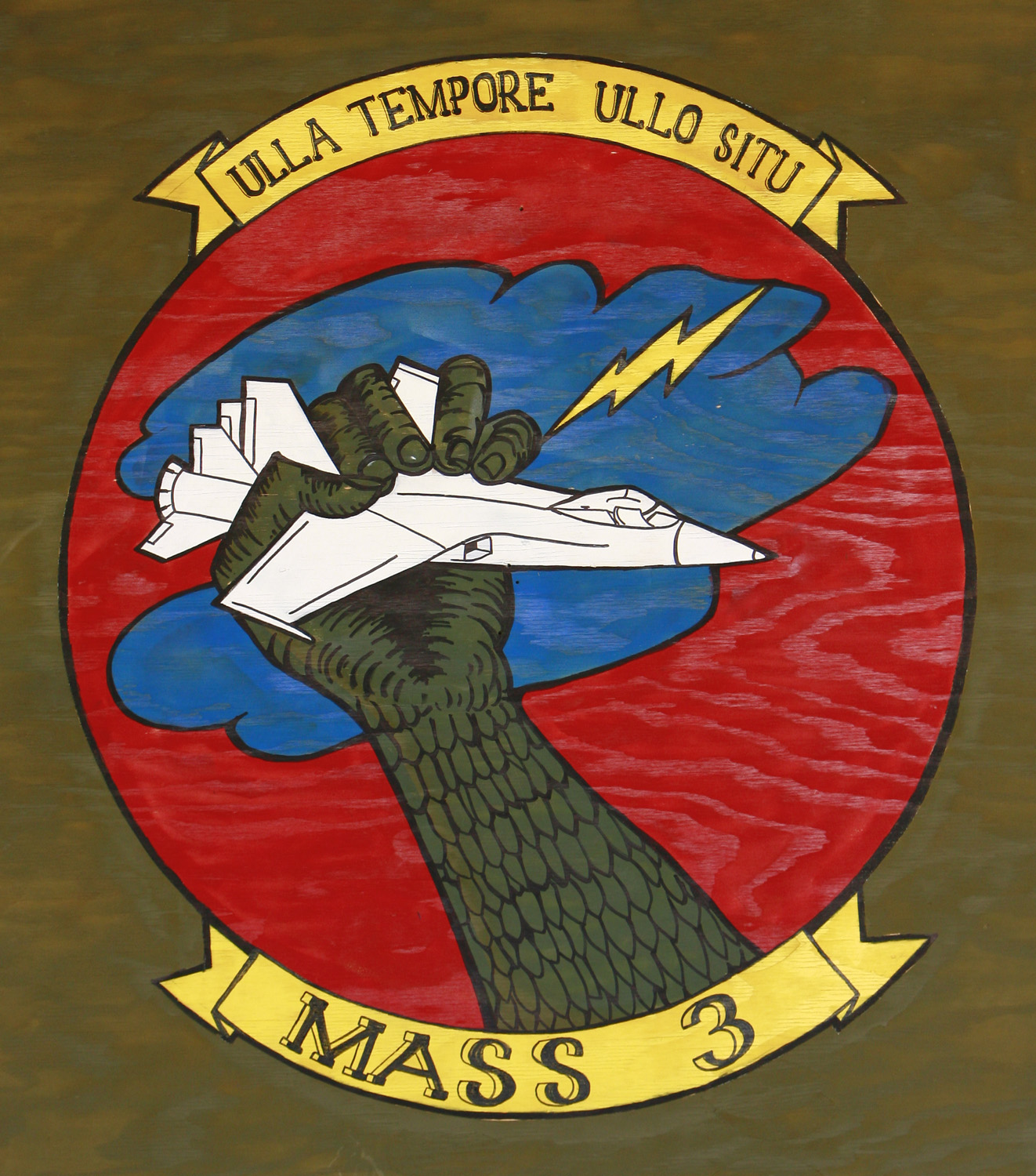
MASS-3 logo from Iraq 2006

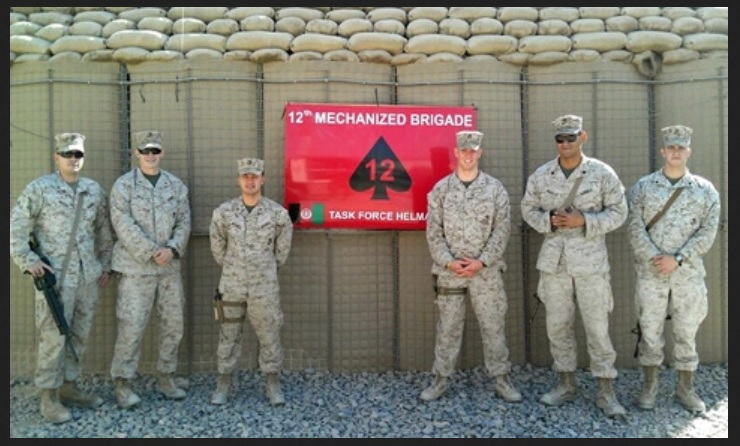
Marines from MASS-3, Air Support Liaison Team, deployed to MOB Lashkar Gah in support of the UK's Operation Herrick XVI

== Unit awards ==
Since the beginning of World War II, the United States military has honored various units for extraordinary heroism or outstanding non-combat service. This information is compiled by the United States Marine Corps History Division and is certified by the Commandant of the Marine Corps.

Streamer	Award	Year(s)	Additional Info
A streamer with red, gold, and blue horizontal stripes with a bronze star in the center	Presidential Unit Citation Streamer with one Bronze Star	1965–1967, 2003	Vietnam, Iraq
A green streamer with red, gold, and blue horizontal stripes along the top and bottom with one silver star in the center	Navy Unit Commendation Streamer with one Silver Star and two Bronze Stars	1967-1968, 1990–1991, 2004–2005, 2010–2011	Vietnam, Southwest Asia, Iraq, Afghanistan
A green streamer with red, gold, and blue horizontal stripes and four stars in the center	Meritorious Unit Commendation Streamer with four Bronze Stars	1968–1971, 1971, 1985–87, 1988–1989, 1998–1999	Vietnam, Vietnam,
A red streamer with a horizontal gold stripe and three bronze stars in the center	National Defense Service Streamer with three Bronze Stars	1951–1954, 1961–1974, 1990–1995, 2001–present	Korean War, Vietnam War, Gulf War, war on terrorism
A multicolored streamer with (from outer to inner) green, yellow, brown, black, light blue, dark blue, white, and red horizontal stripes	Armed Forces Expeditionary Streamer		
A yellow streamer with two green horizontal stripes on the outside and three horizontal red stripes and two silver stars and one bronze star in the center	Vietnam Service Streamer with two Silver Stars and one bronze star		
A multicolored streamer with (from outer to inner) black, yellow, blue, white, red, yellow, and green horizontal stripes, with a grey horizontal stripe and two bronze stars in the center	Southwest Asia Service Streamer with two Bronze Stars		
A multicolored streamer with (from outer to inner) green, red, black (the three colors of the Afghan flag), white, red, and white again horizontal stripes with a blue horizontal stripe in the center	Afghanistan Campaign Streamer with three bronze stars	2010, 2011–2012	Consolidation III, Transition I
A multicolored streamer with (from outer to inner) red, white, green, white again, black (the colors of the Iraqi flag) horizontal stripes with a yellow horizontal stripe in the center	Iraq Campaign Streamer with three bronze stars		
	Global War on Terrorism Expeditionary Streamer	2001–present	
A blue streamer with yellow, red, and white horizontal stripes	Global War on Terrorism Service Streamer	2001–present	
A gold streamer with red horizontal stripes on the outer portions and a green palm in the center	Vietnam Gallantry Cross with Palm Streamer	1965–1971	
A green streamer with red horizontal stripes	Vietnam Meritorious Unit Citation Civil Actions Streamer	1965–1971	

== See also ==
- List of United States Marine Corps aviation support squadrons
- Organization of the United States Marine Corps
