= AN/TPQ-10 Radar Course Directing Central =

Ground based bombing system used by US Marines

AN/TPQ-10
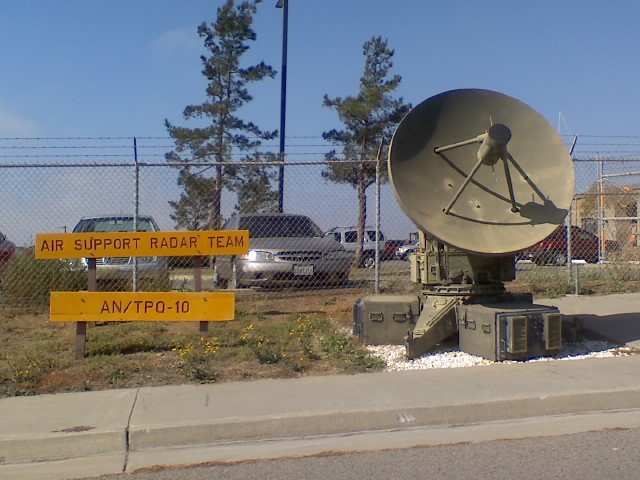
- Country of origin: United States
- Introduced: 1960/61
- Azimuth: 360°
- Power: 250 kW

The General Electric AN/TPQ-10 Course Directing Central was a light-weight, two-unit, helicopter transportable, ground based bombing system developed for use by the United States Marine Corps to provide highly accurate, day/night all weather close air support. This self-contained system was designed to guide an aircraft, equipped with the proper control equipment, to a release point for accurate all-weather delivery of ordnance and supplies to a preselected target. The AN/TPQ-10 and its operators were known as an ‘’Air Support Radar Team’’ (ASRT) and were employed by the Marine Air Support Squadrons within the Aviation Combat Element.

The system was originally fielded in the early 1960s to replace the MPQ-14 Course Directing Central radar which was first utilized during the Korean War. The AN/TPQ-10 saw extensive use during the Vietnam War supporting Marine Forces in the I Corps Tactical Zone from 1965 through 1971, most famously to great effect during the Battle of Khe Sanh in early 1968. It remained a mainstay of Marine Corps close air support tactics until it was phased out of the inventory in the early 1990s after the Gulf War. Improved avionics in military aircraft and the emerging use of satellite based navigation systems had quickly made the AN/TPQ-10 redundant and obsolete.

In accordance with the Joint Electronics Type Designation System (JETDS), the "AN/TPQ-10" designation represents the 10th design of an Army-Navy electronic device for ground transportable special combination radar system. The JETDS system also now is used to name all Department of Defense electronic systems.

== Development and production of radar controlled bombing equipment ==
The Marine Corps experimented with radar controlled bombing as early as December 1944 when an SCR-584 radar from the 8th Antiaircraft Artillery Battalion on Kauai was utilized to direct simulated bombing missions with SB2C and SBD dive bombers. Early results from these tests were positive. The Marine Corps tried again in combat in May 1945 when poor weather during the Battle of Okinawa led Marines to attempt new methods of striking targets from the air. Landing Force Air Support Control Unit III (LFASCU III), working in support of the United States 10th Army, attempted to direct bombing runs in the vicinity of Shuri Castle utilizing an SCR-584 that was co-located with them for the original purpose of directing night fighters. These early attempts proved unsuccessful; however, the seeds of ground based radar control of close air support were planted.

In November 1945, the Commandant of the Marine Corps directed the Commanding General of the 9th Marine Aircraft Wing to evaluate the AN/MPQ Close Cooperation Control Unit for use in close air support operations. Testing was conducted by Marine Air Control Group 1 (MACG-1) under the command of Colonel Robert o. Bisson from 12 April to 6 September 1946. For this testing they utilized an AN/MPQ-2 radar borrowed from the United States Army Air Corps and a F4U Corsair fitted with an AN/APN-19 radar beacon. Testing of this radar for close air support continued at MACG-1 through 1949.

While testing continued on the east coast, Major Marion Dalby led a team of 14 Marines comprising the Marine Corps Liaison Unit of the Naval Air Missile Test Center at Naval Air Station Point Mugu, California. They were tasked to utilize an SCR-584 radar to direct KGW-1 Loon Missiles fired from submarines. They were testing emerging amphibious concepts such as command guiding submarine fired missiles against mapped beach fortifications in support of Marines after they had come ashore during an amphibious assault. Because Loon Missiles were so hard to come by during training, the Marines devised a plan to where more easily available aircraft would replicate the missile's controlled phase of flight and a bomb carried on the plane would replicate the missile's free fall stage of flight. To do this, they designed a small computer that could be carried ashore from a ship and a device that allowed the automatic pilot in an F4U Corsair to accept radio commands from the ground based control system as if it were coming from the plane itself. The computer system told the pilot where to fly and when to drop the bomb. It was during this testing that Major Dalby and his Marines realized that the technology that they developed would have a much more practical application guiding close air support aircraft onto targets. Follow on testing and development of the new computer system in concert with naval engineers at NAS Point Magu and switching the radar to an SCR-784 (amphibious, trailer-mounted version of the SCR-584) had it ready for operational testing.

In April 1950, Dalby and his team travelled to Marine Corps Base Camp Pendleton, California to put on a demonstration of their new radar directed bombing device for senior Marine Corps leadership. The tests were very successful and among those that witnessed the first demonstration were then Colonel Victor H. “Brute” Krulak. Years later, Krulak devoted an entire chapter in his book ‘’First to Fight: An Inside View of the U.S. Marine Corps’’ to the development of this radar by Dalby and his team. This new system would be designated as the AN\TPQ-2 Close Air Support System and would be ready for deployment to Korea in July 1951.

The AN/MPQ-14 controlled close air support sorties in Korea from August 1951 until the cessation of hostilities in July 1953. The 1st Marine Air Support Radar Team (1st MASRT), nicknamed "Devastate Charlie", was attached to Marine Tactical Air Control Squadron 2 (MTACS-2) and operated in support of the 1st Marine Division.

In light of the advancement in the development of equipment, the Marine Corps wanted to improve the accuracy and increase the mobility of the AN/MPQ-14A. A contract was signed with General Electric to develop a system similar in function to the AN/MPQ-14A but having longer range, multiple target capability, greater versatility, better transportability, and less weight. The AN/TPQ-10 was the system developed under this contract. The AN/TPQ-10 was produced by General Electric's Heavy Military Electronics Department in Syracuse, New York.

== Operational history ==
The first operational deployment of the ASRT was in October 1962 when elements of Marine Air Support Squadron 1 were deployed to the Guantanamo Bay Naval Base in Cuba as part of the Marine Expeditionary Brigade formed during the Cuban Missile Crisis. The ASRT was sent to South Vietnam in April 1965 when Marine Air Support Squadron 2 deployed from Okinawa, Japan to support the 9th Marine Expeditionary Brigade after they landed near Da Nang. The first AN/TPQ-10 was set-up 250 feet off the runway at Da Nang Air Base and conducted its first mission on the evening of 31 April 1965 when it provided direction for a C-130 on a flare dispensing mission. At 2150L on 10 May 1965, CWO2 James Harold Davis controlled a division of F-4 Phantoms against targets southwest of Da Nang known as Happy Valley. These were the first ever operational course directed bombing runs in a combat zone utilizing the AN/TPQ-10.

During the Battle of Khe Sanh in 1968, ASRT B from MASS-2 controlled more than 5,000 air strikes. The ASRT was critical to the successful defense of the base.

The AN/TPQ-10 was utilized for additional mission sets as the Vietnam War progressed. They provided course direction for aircraft that were resupplying forward positions via aerial resupply. In emergency situations they also provided ground-controlled approach services at airfields when Air Traffic Control's precision approach radars were not available.

== See also ==
- List of radars
- AN/MPQ-2
- Reeves AN/TPQ-2 Close Air Support System
- Reeves AN/MSQ-77 Bomb Directing Central
- List of military electronics of the United States
