= Marine Air Support Squadron 5 =

U.S. Marine Corps military unit

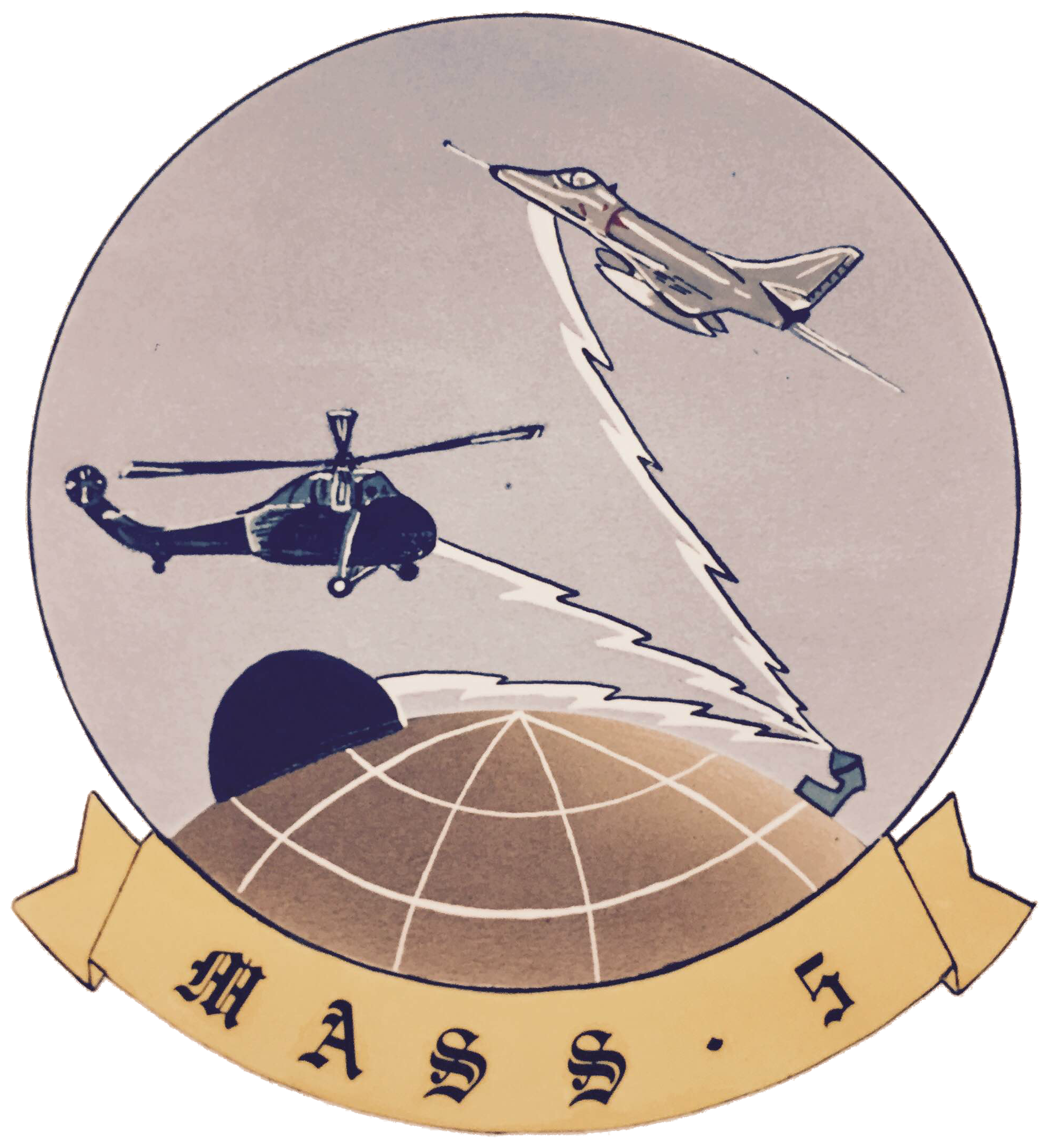
- MASS-5 insignia
- Active: 1 August 1966 – 28 November 1969
- Country: United States
- Branch: USMC
- Type: Aviation command and control
- Role: Provide the DASC
- Part of: Inactive
- Garrison/HQ: Marine Corps Air Station El Toro

Marine Air Support Squadron 5 (MASS-5) was a United States Marine Corps aviation command and control unit that provided the Direct Air Support Center (DASC) capability for the I Marine Expeditionary Force from 1966 through 1969. MASS-5 was headquartered at Marine Corps Air Station El Toro, California, and was part of Marine Air Control Group 38 and the 3rd Marine Aircraft Wing.

== Mission ==
The squadron was responsible for the planning, receiving, coordination and processing of requests for direct or close air support. It provided this through the DASC. The DASC is the principal Marine air command and control system agency, responsible for the direction of air operations directly supporting ground forces. It functions in a decentralized mode of operation, but is directly supervised by the Marine or Navy Tactical Air Command Center. During amphibious or expeditionary operations, the DASC is normally the first air command & control agency ashore and usually lands in the same serial (i.e., scheduled wave or on-call wave) as the Ground Combat Element's senior Fire Support Coordination Center.

== History ==
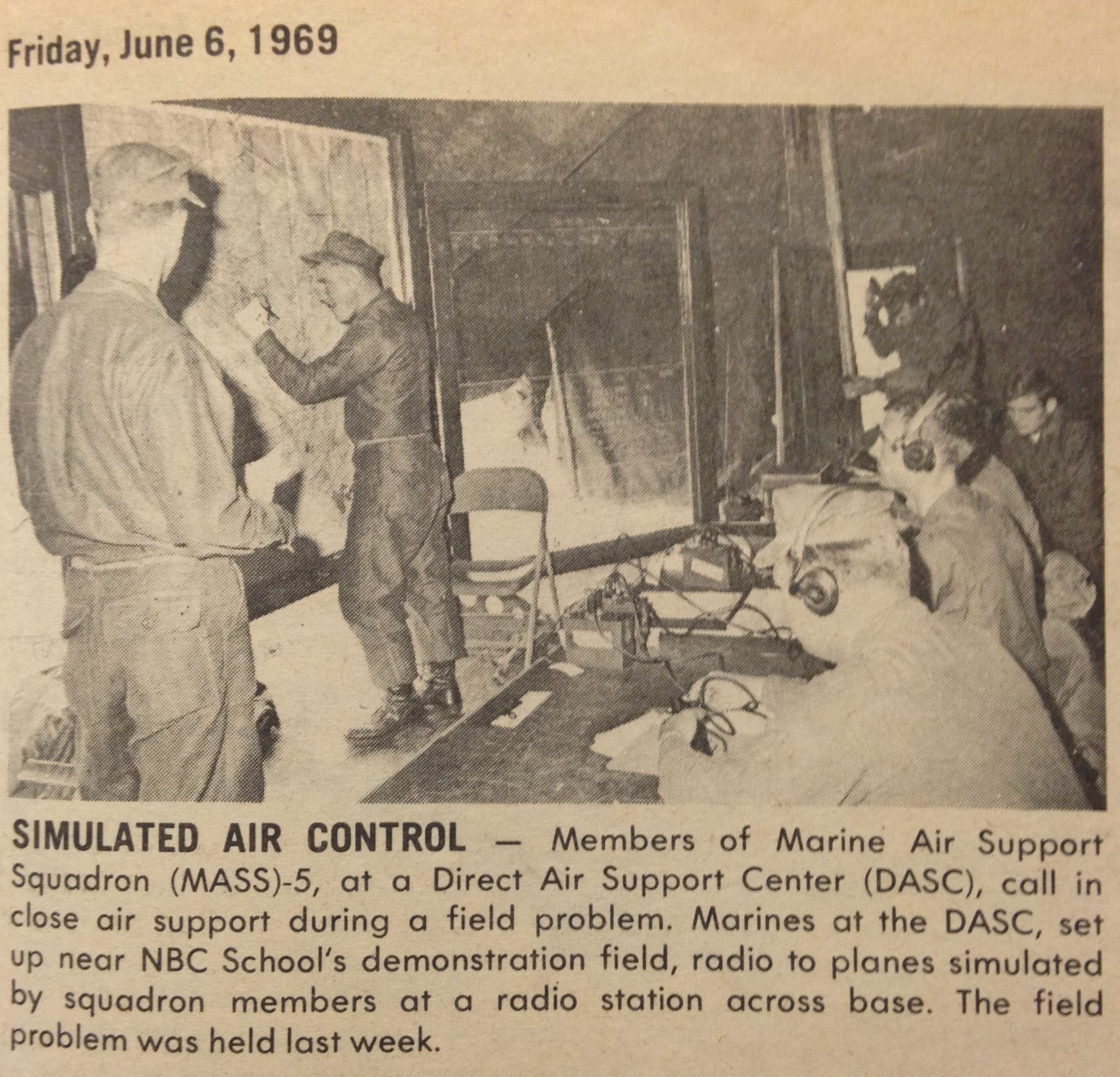
MASS-5 Marines operating inside the Direct Air Support Center

MASS-5 was commissioned on 15 August 1966 at MCAS El Toro with the majority of its original members coming from the ranks of Marine Air Support Squadron 3 (MASS-3). MASS-5 supported training operations for west coast United States Marine Corps exercises while MASS-3 was deployed to the Republic of Vietnam supporting combat operations. The first exercise that MASS-5 supported was "Exercise Snowdrift" in January 1967. During the time they were active they supported numerous exercises at Marine Corps Base Camp Pendleton, Marine Corps Air Ground Combat Center Twentynine Palms, MCAS El Toro and the Chocolate Mountain Aerial Gunnery Range. As regular forces return from Vietnam there was not a need for two Marine Air Support Squadrons on the west coast. MASS-5 was decommissioned on November 28, 1969, at a ceremony conducted at MCAS El Toro. Remaining Marines from the unit were used to form Sub-Unit 1 of Headquarters and Headquarters Squadron 38 (H&HS-38).

== Unit awards ==
A unit citation or commendation is an award bestowed upon an organization for the action cited. Members of the unit who participated in said actions are allowed to wear on their uniforms the awarded unit citation. MASS-5 was presented with the following awards:

Ribbon	Unit Award
	National Defense Service Medal

== See also ==
- United States Marine Corps Aviation
- List of United States Marine Corps aviation support units
