= Direct Air Support Center =

Marine aviation command center

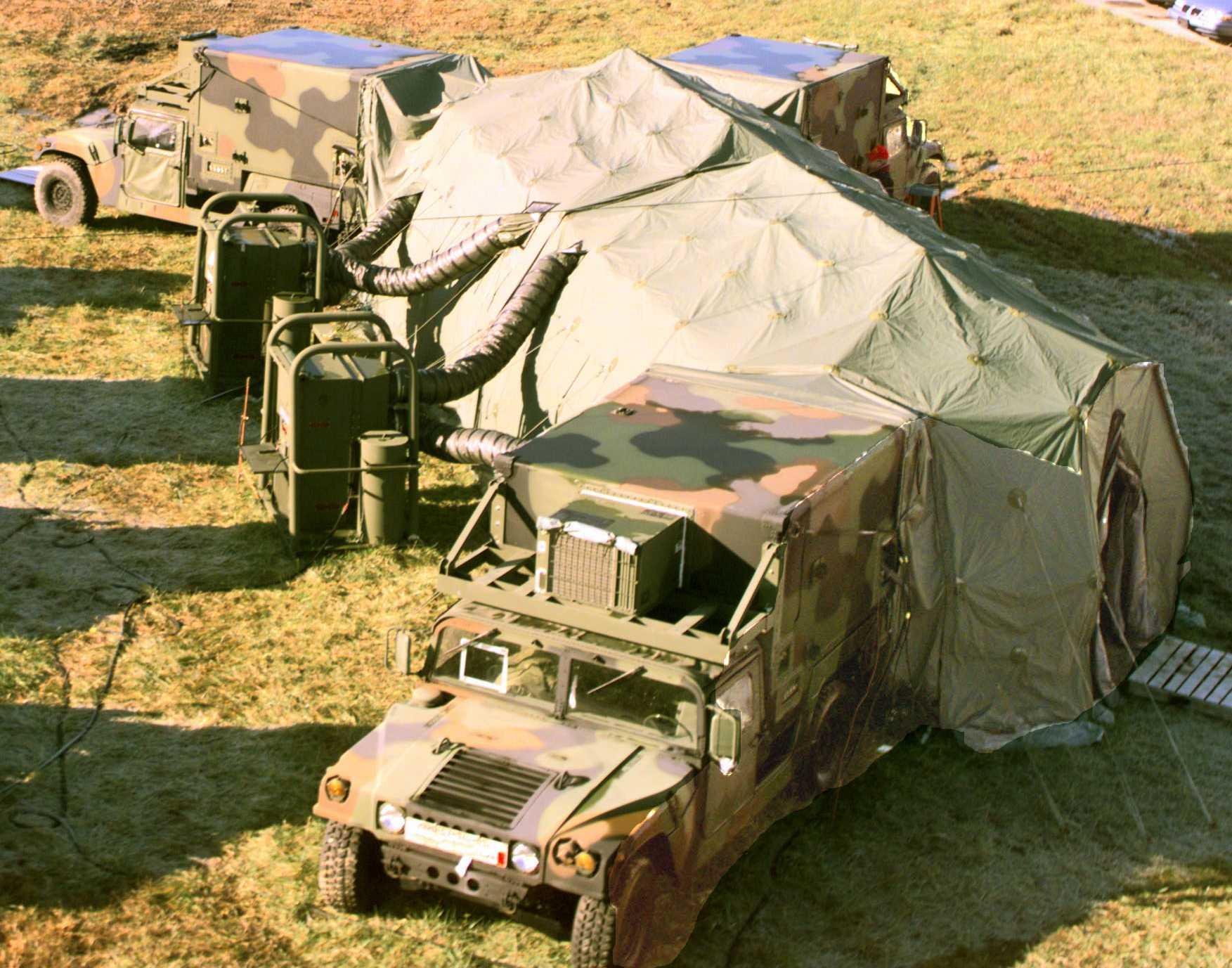
Overhead shot of a DASC setup

The Direct Air Support Center (DASC) is the principal United States Marine Corps aviation command and control system and the air control agency responsible for the direction of air operations directly supporting ground forces. It functions in a decentralized mode of operation, but is directly supervised by the Marine Tactical Air Command Center (TACC) or the Navy Tactical Air Control Center (NTACC). During amphibious or expeditionary operations, the DASC is normally the first Marine Air Command and Control System (MACCS) agency ashore and is usually categorized (i.e. scheduled or on call wave) as the Ground Combat Element's (GCE's) senior Fire Support Coordination Center (FSCC). The DASC's parent unit is the Marine Air Support Squadron (MASS) of the Marine Air Control Group (MACG).

== Role ==
The DASC is responsible for processing immediate air support requests; coordinates aircraft employment with other supporting arms; manages terminal control assets supporting GCE and combat service support element forces; and controls assigned aircraft, unmanned aerial vehicles (UAVs), and itinerant aircraft transiting through DASC controlled airspace. The DASC controls and directs air support activities that effect the GCE commander's focus on close operations and those air missions requiring integration with the ground combat forces (close air support [CAS], assault support and designated air reconnaissance). The DASC does not normally control aircraft conducting deep air support (DAS) missions as detailed coordination of DAS missions is not required with ground forces. However, the DASC provides battle damage assessments (BDAs) and mission reports (MISREPs) from DAS missions to the GCE's senior fire support coordination center (FSCC) and TACC when required.

== Capabilities ==
The DASC's equipment and capabilities are enhanced by the agency's ability to task organize based on the tactical situation. The MASS possesses numerous high-powered communications assets that cover the entire spectrum of single channel radio frequencies. Amongst command and control agencies, the DASC is notable for its high degree of mobility and ability to keep pace with supported ground units. In the most austere scenarios, the basic functions of coordinating and controlling aircraft and processing requests for air support can be accomplished by foot mobile Marines with man-portable radios.

== History ==
=== World War II ===
As World War II progressed, the Marine Corps gained hard fought experience in the application of close air support during amphibious landings. Marine Aviation's primary role was supposed to be supporting the Marines on the ground however by mid-1944 this had not been the case because of earlier decisions made by Marine Corps aviation leadership in the Pacific. In late 1942, then Chief of Naval Operations Admiral Ernest King convinced Marine Major General Ross E. Rowell, commanding general of Marine Air Wings, Pacific, that there was no longer a need for Marines to get carrier qualifications since all of their aircraft were currently based out of land based strips. This lack of foresight led to Marine pilots not being able to fly from escort carriers which were providing the close air support during later amphibious landings. This would return to haunt the Marine Corps during the Mariana and Palau Islands campaign in which it was generally felt that close air support provided by pilots from the United States Navy left much to be desired. The lack of adequate air support was coupled with the feeling amongst other senior Marine aviators such as Roy Geiger and then Commandant Alexander Vandegrift that Marine aviation was not paying attention to its primary purpose of providing close air support and was too concerned with shooting down enemy aircraft. In August 1944, General Vandegrift flew to Hawaii to meet with Admiral Nimitz and his staff and came up with the solution that Marine squadrons would be assigned to escort carriers providing planes for ships the Navy could not support, Marine aviation would take control of aircraft directly supporting ground troops during amphibious operations and Marine Air Wing Pacific would be renamed Aircraft, Fleet Marine Force, Pacific. This new role was not welcomed by Rowell and he became so negative that he was quickly replaced by MajGen Francis P. Mulcahy in October 1944.

On 21 October 1944 the Marine Corps stood up a new unit titled the Provisional Air Support Command (PASC) at Marine Corps Air Station Ewa, Hawaii under the command of Colonel Vernon E. Megee. This new unit was tasked with allowing the landing force commander to exercise full control of supporting aircraft during amphibious operations. The PASC was composed of a headquarters element and four Landing Force Air Support Control Units (LFASCU) with leadership being provided by some of the best and brightest Marine Aviators as they rotated back to the Pacific from supporting establishment billets. The LFASCUs were 87 man units commanded by a colonel. By the end of November 1944 the personnel and equipment for LFASCU-1 were appropriately formed and they commenced training in air support problems at MCAS Ewa. PASC leadership also experimented with radar controlled bombing in December 1944 when they coordinated to use an SCR-584 radar from the 8th Antiaircraft Artillery Battalion on Kauai to direct simulated bombing missions with SB2C and SBD dive bombers. Early results from these tests were positive. By early January 1945, LFASCU-1 reported to the V Amphibious Corps in preparation for the assault on Iwo Jima. LFASCU #1 departed Hawaii on 1 February 1945 whilst LFASCUs 2-4 remained in the vicinity of MCAS Ewa training for future operations.

LFASCU-1 went ashore at Iwo Jima on 24 February 1945 establishing their position a half a mile from the base of Mount Suribachi. On 1 March 1945 at 1000 LFASCU-1 assumed control of close air support missions. This marked the first time that the United States Navy had officially delegated this authority ashore during an amphibious operation. LFASCU-1 operated on Iwo Jima until 11 March 1945 when they were pulled out in order to begin preparations for follow on operations.

LFASCU-2 departed Hawaii on 17 February 1945 on board the USS Achernar (AKA-53) and LFASCU-3 left six days later on board USS Cepheus (AKA-18). All three of these units were tasked with providing support for the upcoming invasion of Okinawa which was scheduled for 1 April 1945. All three LFASCUs came ashore on the first day of the invasion and established their agencies. LFASCU 1 in support of the V Amphibious Corps, while LFASCU-2 supported the Army's XXIV Corps and LFASCU-3 coordinated close air support for the higher headquarters of the Tenth United States Army. During the course of the battle the three LFASCUs handled a total of 10, 506 close air support sorties.

=== 1945 - 1950 ===
At the end of World War II the LFASCUs were disbanded as they rotated back to the United States. The air support functionality remained as part of the Headquarters Squadron of the Marine Air Control Group until 1 July 1947 when Marine Tactical Air Control Squadrons 1 and 2 were formed. The original mission of the Marine Tactical Air Control Squadrons was to provide the facilities required for centralized control of air operations in support of Fleet Marine Force operations. This meant they supported both the establishment of the Marine Tactical Air Control Center and the coordination of close air support for the ground combat element. Their mission was accomplished via the accomplishment of four tasks:

- (1) Supervise the deployment and sighting of assigned Marine Ground Control Intercept Squadrons (MGCIS);
- (2) Install, operate and maintain a Tactical Air Control Center (TACC) or Tactical Air Direction Center (TADC);
- (3) Receive and correlate requests for close air support (CAS);
- (4) Operate and maintain facilities for electronic control of CAS operations.

=== Korean War ===
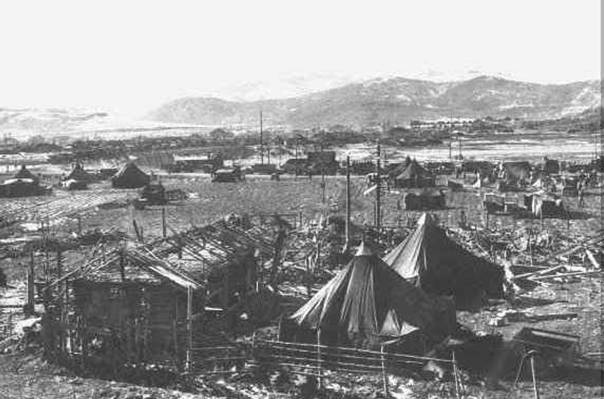
Photo showing MTACS-2's Air Support Section at Hagaru-ri during the Battle of Chosin Reservoir.

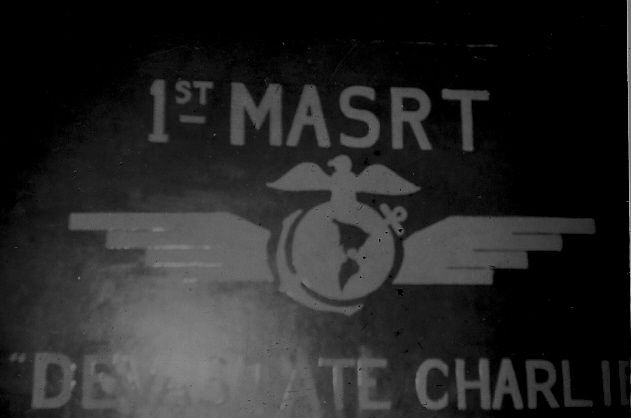
Dev Chrl Sign

Marine Tactical Air Control Squadron 2 (MTACS-2), the precursor to today's MASS-2, operated an Air Support section and conducted operations during the Korean War at the Pusan Perimeter, Battle of Inchon, Battle of Seoul, Battle of Chosin Reservoir, the East Central Front, and the Western Front.

At the outbreak of the Korean War, MTACS-2 was severely understrength. Additional Marines were joined from other squadrons within Marine Air Control Group 2 to fill out the squadron's ranks prior to deployment.

After arriving in Pohang on 4 August, the Air Support Section assumed control of all close air support aircraft for 1st Provisional Marine Brigade engaged on the Pusan perimeter. For the Inchon invasion, MTACS-2's Air Support Section disembarked at Inchon in support of the 1st Marine Division. When the 1st Marine Division sailed for Wonsan, the squadron's Air Support Sections sailed with them. The Air Support section was with the 1st Marine Division from 27 November – 10 December 1950 during the Battle of Chosin Reservoir. They controlled the flow of aircraft in support of the division and also manned a portion of the western perimeter at Hagaru-ri where the Division Headquarters was located.

After the successful breakout of the Chosin Reservoir, the Air Support section was transported to Masan, on the southern coast of Korea. In August 1951, the Marine Air Support Radar Team 1 arrived from CONUS and was attached to MTACS-2. In March 1952, the Air Support section moved with the 1st Marine Division to the western front near Panmunjum. The Air Defense section continued to operate the TACC of the 1st Marine Aircraft Wing from its location at K-3 Airfield. MASS-2 was one of the last USMC units to leave Korea after the war. They finally departed after Easter 1956.

=== Vietnam ===
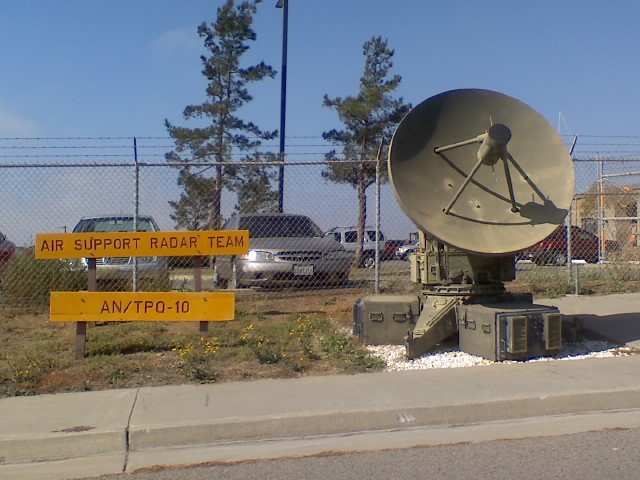
Photo of the AN/TPQ-10 Radar outside of the MASS-3 Headquarters building on Camp Pendleton, CA. This is one of the radars employed by the ASRTs during the Vietnam War.

In April 1965, MASS-2 deployed to South Vietnam as part of the III Marine Amphibious Force and provided both Direct Air Support Centers and Air Support Radar Teams (ASRTs) in support of ground combat units. MASS-3 entered Vietnam on 10 November 1966 when they disembarked from the USS Jennings County at Chu Lai. MASS-2 supported the 3rd Marine Division in the northern two provinces of I Corps while MASS-3 worked in support of the 1st Marine Division in the southern three provinces of I Corps. From 1966-1971, MASS-3 ASRTs controlled more than 38,010 AN/TPQ-10 missions, directing more than 121,000 tons of ordnance on 56,753 targets. (a 10:1 ratio) The ASRTs utilized the AN/TPQ-10 with great success, especially during the Battle of Khe Sanh, where poor weather made conventional close air support methods unreliable. The AN/TPQ-10 had a 50-yard (46 m) Circular error probable and could handle up to 105 missions a day. The commander of the Khe Sanh defense, Col. David E. Lownds, said "Anything but the highest praise would not have been enough." By the end of the war, the DASCs and ASRTs participated in virtually every major Marine combat operation.

=== The 1980s and the Gulf War ===
In the early 1980s, the AN/TPQ-10 was replaced by the more sophisticated AN/TPB-1D, which, after extensive service in Operation Desert Storm, was removed from service due to the growing technological sophistication of onboard navigation and weapons delivery systems in modern fixed and rotary wing aircraft. During Operation Desert Storm the DASC was operational for 984 hours. They controlled 4948 fixed wing missions and 839 rotary wing missions. During this time they received 375 immediate joint tactical air requests (JTARs), 114 immediate assault support requests (ASRs) and 153 immediate medevacs.

=== Operation Iraqi Freedom ===
For the 2003 invasion of Iraq, the DASC for the I Marine Expeditionary Force was provided by MASS-3 with augmentation from MASS-1 and MASS-6. MASS-3 was divided into a main body (DASC Main) and a forward echelon (DASC Fwd). The main was attached to the Main Headquarters of the 1st Marine Division while the forward was attached to the Division "Jump Command Post (CP)." The DASC (Fwd) was also a part of Task Force Tripoli which pushed north into Tikrit at the end of the invasion. Air support Marines from MASS-1 provided a DASC for Task Force Tarawa and staffed a DASC (Airborne) detachment out of Ahmad al-Jaber Air Base in Kuwait. An additional Air Support Element from the 11th Marine Expeditionary Unit supported British Forces on the Al Faw Peninsula. Lastly, Air Support Liaison Teams (ASLTs) were provided to all of the regiments within the 1st Marine Division to affect coordination with the DASC.

The Marine Corps' concept for air support control proved to be very successful during OIF 1. DASC crews were able to clear targets much quicker than the Air Support Operations Center that was working in support of V Corps. The DASC had four unique traits that streamlined the processing of air support requests for I MEF:

- 1) Controlled both fixed wing and rotary wing air which provided additional aircraft for assignment and easier deconfliction;
- 2) Had organic Marine Aviation in direct support;
- 3) Crewed by professional aviation command and control Marines whose primary job is the coordination of close air support
- 4) The agency was assigned at the division level vice corps level

MASS-3 returned to Iraq with the 1st Marine Division to provide air support in January 2004. They were based out of Camp Blue Diamond in Ramadi and were replaced in January 2005 by MASS-1. The DASC moved to Camp Fallujah near the city of Fallujah in January 2006 around the same time that MASS-3 returned to Iraq to retake the air support mission in Al Anbar Province. MASS-1 again switched out with MASS-3 in early 2007 and provided air support for the 2nd Marine Division.

== Tasks ==
- Receive the Air Tasking Order (ATO) from the TACC (Marine or Navy) and coordinate planned direct air support.
- Receive, process and coordinate requests for immediate direct air support.
- Adjust planned schedules, divert airborne assets, and launch aircraft as necessary when delegated authority by the aviation combat element (ACE) commander and in coordination with the Marine Air Ground Task Force fires coordination center (FFCC) or GCE senior FSCC.
- Coordinate the execution of direct air support missions with other supporting arms through the appropriate FFCC/FSCC and, as required, with the appropriate MACCS agencies.
- Receive and disseminate pertinent tactical information reported by aircraft performing direct air support missions.
- Provide aircraft and air control agencies with advisory and threat information to assist in the safe conduct of flight.
- Monitor, record and display information on direct air support missions.
- Maintain friendly and enemy ground situation displays necessary to coordinate direct air support missions.
- Provide direct air support aircraft and other MACCS agencies with information concerning the friendly and enemy situation.
- Refer unresolved conflicts in supporting arms to the FFCC/FSCC fire support coordinator (FSC).

== Current Units ==
Squadron Name	Insignia	Nickname	Date Commissioned	Senior Command	Station
MASS-1		Atlantic Nomads	25 June 1943	MACG-28, 2nd MAW	MCAS Cherry Point, NC
MASS-2		Pacific Vagabonds	1 January 1943	MACG-18, 1st MAW	MCAS Futenma, Okinawa, Japan
MASS-3		Blacklist	3 August 1950	MACG-38, 3rd MAW	MCAS Camp Pendleton, CA
MASS-6		Lighthouse	15 May 1947	MACG-48, 4th MAW	Westover ARB, Chicopee, MA
MASS-6 Det A		Pacific Penguins		MACG-48, 4th MAW	MCAS Miramar, CA

== Decommissioned air support units ==
Squadron Name	Date Activated	Date Deactivated
Marine Air Support Control Unit	21 October 1944	
Landing Force Air Support Control Unit 1	November 1944	10 September 1945
Landing Force Air Support Control Unit 2	January 1945	11 September 1945
Landing Force Air Support Control Unit 3	January 1945	6 March 1946
Landing Force Air Support Control Unit 4	February 1945	19 November 1945
Marine Air Support Squadron 4	1 July 1962	28 February 1989
Marine Air Support Squadron 5	1 August 1966	28 November 1969
