= Marine Air Support Squadron 4 =

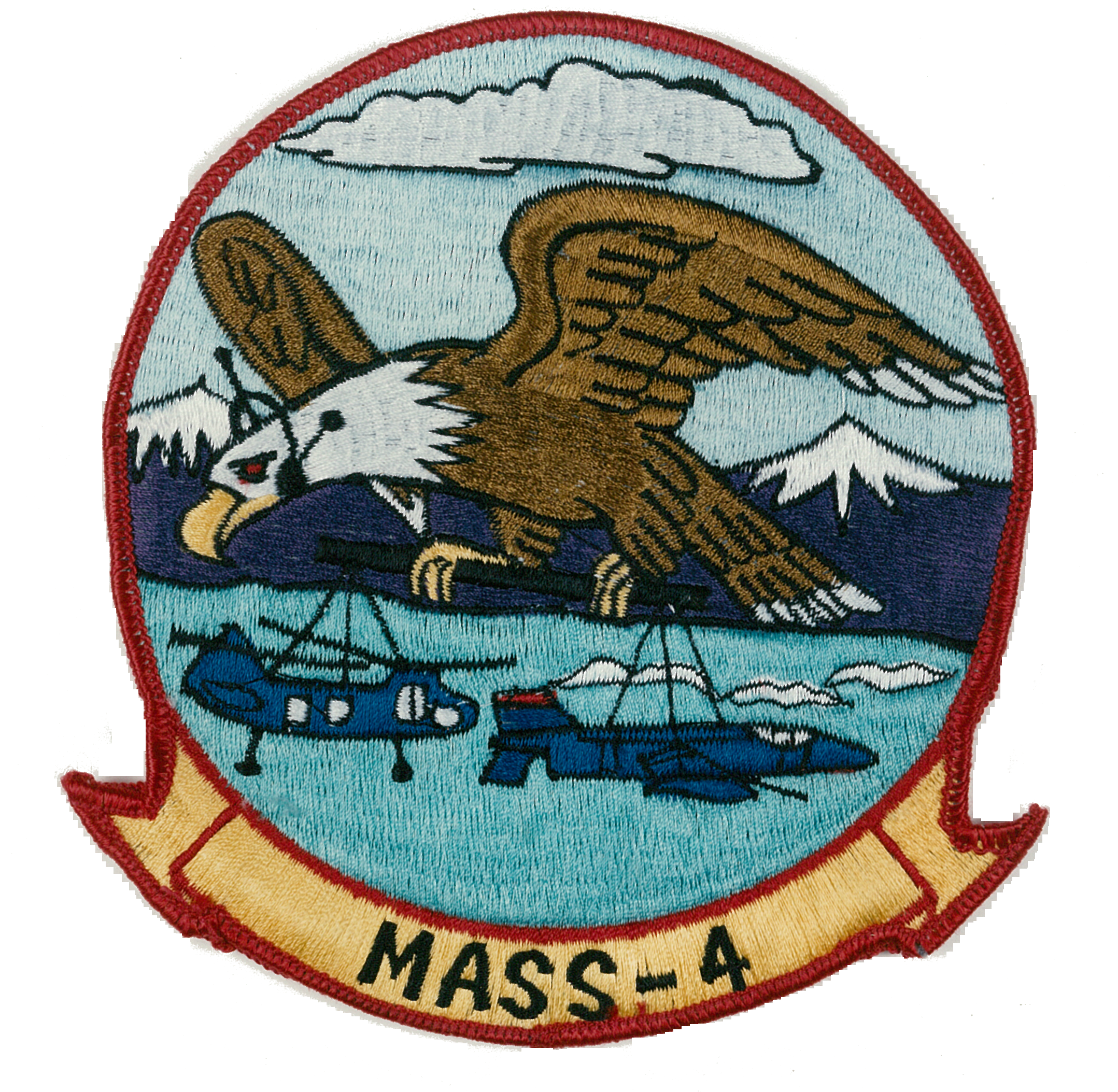
- MASS-4 insignia
- Active: 1 July 1982 - unknown
- Country: United States of America
- Branch: United States Marine Corps
- Type: Aviation command and control
- Role: Provide the DASC
- Part of: Inactive
- Garrison/HQ: Naval Air Station Los Alamitos

Marine Air Support Squadron 4 (MASS-4) was a reserve United States Marine Corps aviation command and control unit that provided the Direct Air Support Center (DASC) capability from 1962 through the early 1990s. MASS-4 was headquartered at Naval Air Station Los Alamitos, California, and was part of Marine Air Control Group 48 (MACG-48) and the 4th Marine Aircraft Wing (4th MAW).

== Mission ==
The squadron was responsible for the planning, receiving, coordination and processing of requests for direct or close air support. It provided this through the DASC. The DASC is the principal Marine air command and control system agency, responsible for the direction of air operations directly supporting ground forces. It functions in a decentralized mode of operation, but is directly supervised by the Marine or Navy Tactical Air Command Center. During amphibious or expeditionary operations, the DASC is normally the first air command & control agency ashore and usually lands in the same serial (i.e., scheduled wave or on-call wave) as the Ground Combat Element's senior Fire Support Coordination Center.

== History ==
MASS-4 was commissioned 1 July 1962 at NAS Alamitos with personnel being provided by the recently decommissioned Marine Ground Control Intercept Squadron 18 (MGCIS-18). They regularly participated in exercises at Marine Corps Air Station El Toro, the Marine Corps Air Ground Combat Center Twentynine Palms, Chocolate Mountain Aerial Gunnery Range and Marine Corps Base Camp Pendleton.

The 1967 summer maneuvers saw MASS-4 participate in EXERCISE Golden Slipper at MCB Camp Pendleton. The exercise was the largest reserve-regular exercise in Marine Corps history up to that point. In 1975 and 1976 MASS-4 was awarded the "Herman Ridder Award" as the outstanding air control squadron in 4th MAW. The squadron was also the recipient of the "High Intercept Trophy" and the title of "4th Marine Aircraft Wing Air Control Squadron of the Year" for 1982. In 1985 the squadron participated in EXERCISE Port Call a large mobilization exercise.

== Unit awards ==
A unit citation or commendation is an award bestowed upon an organization for the action cited. Members of the unit who participated in said actions are allowed to wear on their uniforms the awarded unit citation. MASS-4 was presented with the following awards:

Ribbon	Unit Award
	National Defense Service Medal with bronze star

== See also ==
- United States Marine Corps Aviation
- List of United States Marine Corps aviation support units
