= Marine Air Support Squadron 6 =

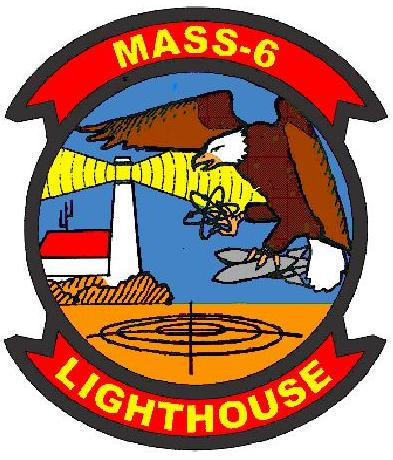
- MASS 6 insignia
- Active: 15 May 1947 - 30 November 1950; 18 January 1952 - 31 July 1962; 1 August 1962 - present
- Country: United States
- Branch: United States Marine Corps
- Type: Aviation command and control
- Role: Provide the DASC
- Part of: Marine Air Control Group 48; 4th Marine Aircraft Wing
- Garrison/HQ: Westover Air Reserve Base
- Nickname: Lighthouse
- Engagements: Operation Desert Storm; Operation Iraqi Freedom * 2003 invasion of Iraq

Commanders
- Current commander: Lt. Col. Jessica J. Gaul

Marine Air Support Squadron 6 (MASS-6), is a reserve United States Marine Corps aviation command and control unit that provides the Direct Air Support Center (DASC) for the Marine Forces Reserve. Their headquarters is in Westover Air Reserve Base, Massachusetts and their Detachment Alpha is located at Marine Corps Air Station Miramar, California

== Mission ==
Provide Direct Air Support Center (DASC) capabilities for control and coordination of aircraft operating in direct support of Marine Air-Ground Task Force (MAGTF) Operations.

== History ==
Marine Ground Control Intercept Squadron 21 (MGCIS-21) was commissioned on 15 May 1947 at Naval Air Station Squantum, Massachusetts. They provided early warning and ground control intercept as part of the Marine Air Reserve Training Command until they were decommissioned on 30 November 1950. The squadron was reactivated on 18 January 1952 and in December 1953 moved to Naval Air Station South Weymouth. On 1 March 1954 they were re-designated as Marine Air Control Squadron 21 (MACS-21) and operated as such until their deactivation on 31 July 1962.

The squadron was quickly repurposed and brought back on 1 August 1962 as Marine Air Traffic Control Unit 73 (MATCU-73). MATCU-73 was responsible for providing air traffic control and precision approach radar services at NAS South Weymouth. This new designation did not last long because on 1 January 1963 they reverted to MACS-21.

On 1 April 1967 the squadron would gain its current moniker when it was re-designated Marine Air Support Squadron 6 (MASS-6). \Elements of MASS-6 would help support Operation Desert Storm in 1990/1991. After the Gulf War and in light of the Base Realignment and Closure (BRA) military downturn, the unit was relocated to Westover Air Force Base and occupied duplexes for 9 years until a new Marine Reserve Center was built with the politic backing of both sides of the political aisle.

Operation Iraqi Freedom For the 2003 invasion of Iraq, the DASC for the I Marine Expeditionary Force was provided by MASS-3 with augmentation from MASS-1 and MASS-6. It was broken up into a main echelon (DASC Main) and a forward echelon (DASC Fwd). The main was attached to the Main Headquarters of the 1st Marine Division while the forward was attached to the Division "Jump Command Post (CP)." The DASC (Fwd) was also a part of Task Force Tripoli when they went into Tikrit at the end of the invasion. Air support Marines also provided a smaller DASC for Task Force Tarawa, the British Forces on the Al Faw Peninsula, staffed a DASC (A) detachment out of Ahmad al-Jaber Air Base in Kuwait and provided Air Support Liaison Teams (ASLTs) to all of the regiments within the 1st Marine Division.

MASS-3 returned to Iraq with the 1st Marine Division to provide air support in January 2004. They were based out of Camp Blue Diamond in Ramadi and were replaced in January 2005 by MASS-1. The DASC moved to Camp Fallujah near the city of Fallujah in January 2006 around the same time that MASS-3 returned to Iraq to retake the air support mission in Al Anbar Province. MASS-1 again switched out with MASS-3 in early 2007 and provided air support for the 2nd Marine Division.

Marine Air Support Squadron 6 Marines now wear the Naval Aviation Observer Wings they were awarded March 25, 2011. The wings were typically awarded to operators of the OV-10 Bronco surveillance aircraft only, which were phased out of service in 1995. According to Marine Administrative Message 091/11, released Feb. 11, Marines involved with air support control operations may now wear the wings as well.

In addition the Unit received numerous commendations for NATO exercises Battle Griffin in Norway as well as providing support to Combined Arms Exercises at 29 Palms, CA, Marine Combat Center. During these exercises in the 1980, the Reserve Unit created what is now a standard protocol for all Marine Air Support Units by creating the Air Support Liaison Party or ASLP. Originally designed to get the most up to the minute status on enemy air, troop movements close air support missions and medevacs inside the Battalion S-3 Operations, it quickly became a necessity for ground units to rely on for communications and close air support with forward air controllers. Today every battalion or regiment rates an ASLT when deploying either in a MEU (Marine Expeditionary Unit) or MEB (Marine Expeditionary Brigade) to all corners of the globe.

== See also ==
- Organization of the United States Marine Corps
- List of United States Marine Corps air support squadrons
