= Marine Air Support Squadron 1 =

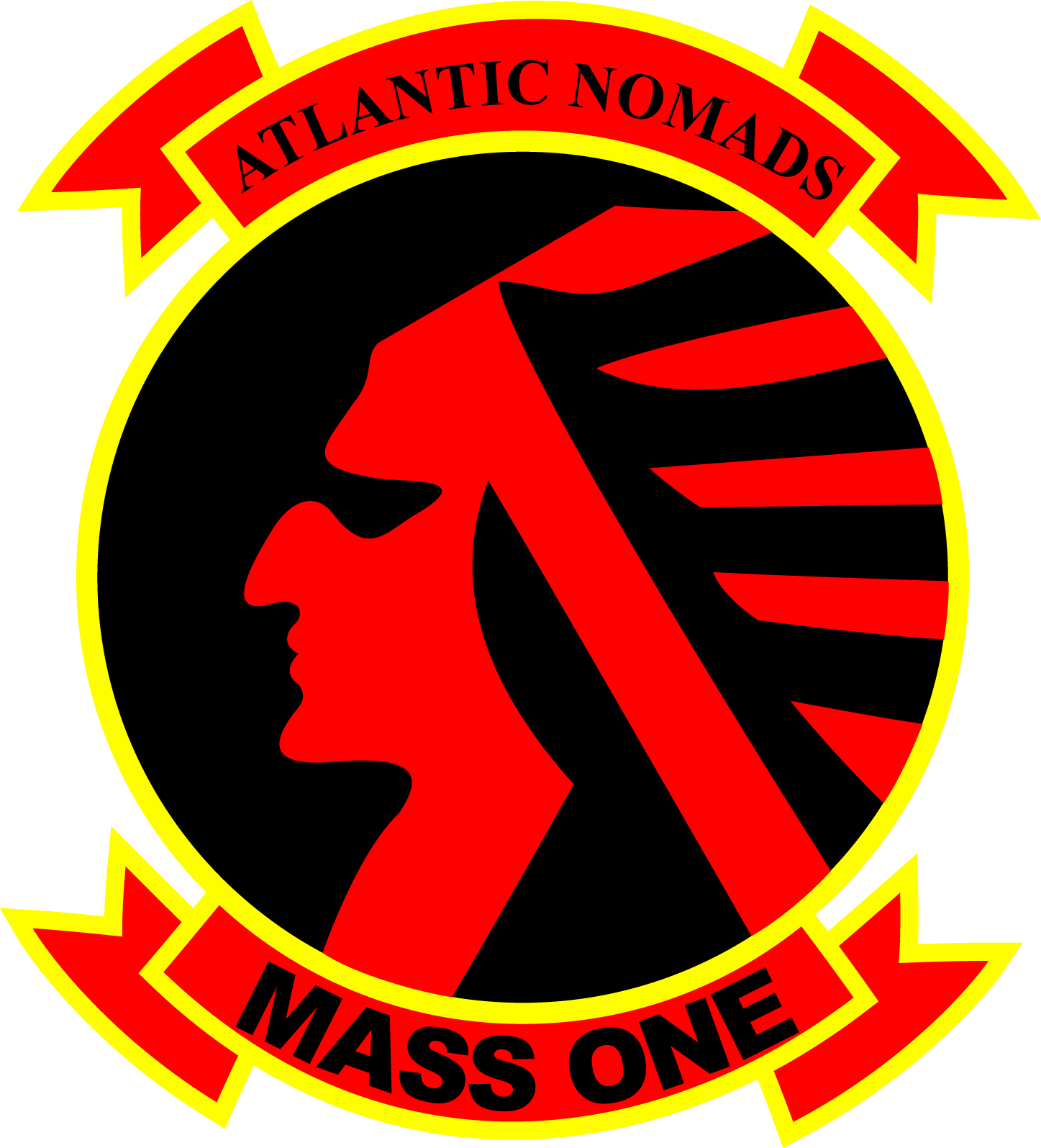
- MASS-1 insignia
- Founded: 1 July 1943; 82 years ago
- Country: United States of America
- Branch: United States Marine Corps
- Type: Aviation command and control
- Role: Provide the DASC
- Part of: Marine Air Control Group 28; 2nd Marine Aircraft Wing
- Garrison/HQ: Marine Corps Air Station Cherry Point
- Nickname: "Chieftain"
- Engagements: Operation Power Pack; Operation Desert Storm; Operation Iraqi Freedom; Operation Enduring Freedom

Commanders
- Current commander: LtCol Martin R. Bebell

Marine Air Support Squadron 1 (MASS-1) is a United States Marine Corps aviation command and control unit that provides the Direct Air Support Center to coordinate close air support for the II Marine Expeditionary Force. Callsign "Chieftain," the squadron is based out of Marine Corps Air Station Cherry Point, North Carolina, and falls under the command of Marine Air Control Group 28 and the 2nd Marine Aircraft Wing.

== Mission ==
The squadron is responsible for the planning, receiving, coordination and processing of requests for direct or close air support. It provides this through the DASC, whether ground or airborne based. The DASC is the principal Marine air command and control system agency, responsible for the direction of air operations directly supporting ground forces. It functions in a decentralized mode of operation, but is directly supervised by the Marine or Navy Tactical Air Command Center. During amphibious or expeditionary operations, the DASC is normally the first air command & control agency ashore and usually lands in the same serial (i.e., scheduled wave or on-call wave) as the Ground Combat Element's senior Fire Support Coordination Center.

== History ==
Headquarters and Services Squadron, 1st Marine Aircraft Wing was commissioned on July 1, 1943 at Marine Corps Air Station Cherry Point. On April 1, 1944 the squadron was assigned to the 9th Marine Aircraft Wing and on March 31, 1946 it was again reassigned to the 2nd Marine Aircraft Wing. In July 1947, the unit was re-designated as Marine Tactical Air Control Squadron 1 (MARTACRON-1). In January 1948, MTACS-1 participated in the Seconds Fleet Tactical Exercises at Vieques, Puerto Rico returning on March 20, 1948. The squadron boarded USS LST-664 on February 13, 1949 and again sailed for Vieques to control aircraft during operations. The squadron returned on April 1. Between July 18-28, 1949, the squadron hosted Marine Ground Control Intercept Squadrons 21 & 22 for their annual training. Between October 5 & November 14, 1949 MTACS-1 participated in cold weather exercises in Cape Porcupine, Labrador. On February 15, 1954, the squadron assumed its present designation as Marine Air Support Squadron 1.

In May 1956, MASS-1 deployed to the Dominican Republic and provided air support for Operation Power Pack by carrying out its duties as controlling agency for rotary and fixed wing aircraft. On September 1, 1967 the squadron was reassigned to Marine Air Control Group 28, where it remains today.

In August 1990, MASS-1 deployed a detachment in support of 4th Marine Expeditionary Brigade, the amphibious forces which deployed to Southwest Asia during Operation Desert Shield. A second detachment later deployed to provide an airborne DASC in support of I MEF, and both detachments ultimately participated in Operation Desert Storm. During the 1990s, the squadron was twice designated as the Marine Air Command and Control Systems Unit of the Year, receiving the prestigious "Edward S. Fris Award" in both 1992 and 1998.

On January 21, 2003, the squadron began deploying to Kuwait in support of the 3rd Marine Aircraft Wing. During the 2003 invasion of Iraq it was tasked with conducting airborne DASC operations from the back of Lockheed Martin KC-130 cargo aircraft and supporting Task Force Tarawa. The squadron returned home in June 2003. From January 2005 until February 2006, MASS-1 again deployed to Iraq to provide a DASC, Air Support Elements and Air Support Liaison Teams throughout Al Anbar Province. MASS-1 deployed to Iraq a third time in 2007 for a year-long tour in support of Operation Iraqi Freedom. In 2009, the squadron returned to Iraq for another 12-month deployment, while also sending a detachment on a concurrent combat deployment to Afghanistan in support of Marine Aircraft Group 40.

Since the end of combat operations, MASS-1 moved into a state-of-the-art aviation C2 complex in 2016. MASS-1 leads the Marine Air Command and Control community as an innovator, qualifying the first DASC data link specialists (JICO/AJOC), developing enlisted controllers who are also qualified to operate from U.S. Navy ships, and integrating live/virtual/constructive training networks into their garrison facility.

== Unit awards ==
Since the beginning of World War II, the United States military has honored various units for extraordinary heroism or outstanding non-combat service. This information is compiled by the United States Marine Corps History Division and is certified by the Commandant of the Marine Corps. MASS-1 has been presented with the following awards:

Streamer	Award	Year(s)	Additional Info
	Presidential Unit Citation Streamer	2003	2003 Invasion of Iraq
	Joint Meritorious Unit Award Streamer	1990	Counter-narcotics
	Navy Unit Commendation Streamer with two Bronze Stars	1990–1991, 2007–08, 2009-10	Southwest Asia, Iraq x 2
	Meritorious Unit Commendation Streamer with one Bronze Star	1976, 1997–98	USS Guam, CONUS
	Marine Corps Expeditionary Streamer	1962	Cuban Missile Crisis
	American Campaign Streamer	1943-46	World War II
	World War II Victory Streamer	1941–1945	Pacific War
A red streamer with a horizontal gold stripe and three bronze stars in the center	National Defense Service Streamer with three Bronze Stars	1951–1954, 1961–1974, 1990–1995, 2001–present	Korean War, Vietnam War, Gulf War, war on terrorism
A multicolored streamer with (from outer to inner) green, yellow, brown, black, light blue, dark blue, white, and red horizontal stripes	Armed Forces Expeditionary Streamer	1962	Cuban Missile Crisis
A multicolored streamer with (from outer to inner) black, yellow, blue, white, red, yellow, and green horizontal stripes, with a grey horizontal stripe and two bronze stars in the center	Southwest Asia Service Streamer with two Bronze Stars	1991, 1991	
	Afghanistan Campaign Streamer with two bronze stars	2009, 2009-10	Consolidation II, Consolidation III
	Iraq Campaign Streamer with four bronze stars	2005, 2005-06, 2007-08, 2009-10	Al Anbar Province
	Global War on Terrorism Expeditionary Streamer	2003	
A blue streamer with yellow, red, and white horizontal stripes	Global War on Terrorism Service Streamer	2001–present	

== See also ==
- United States Marine Corps Aviation
- List of United States Marine Corps aviation support units
