= American occupation of Ramadi =

Occupation of a city during the Iraq War

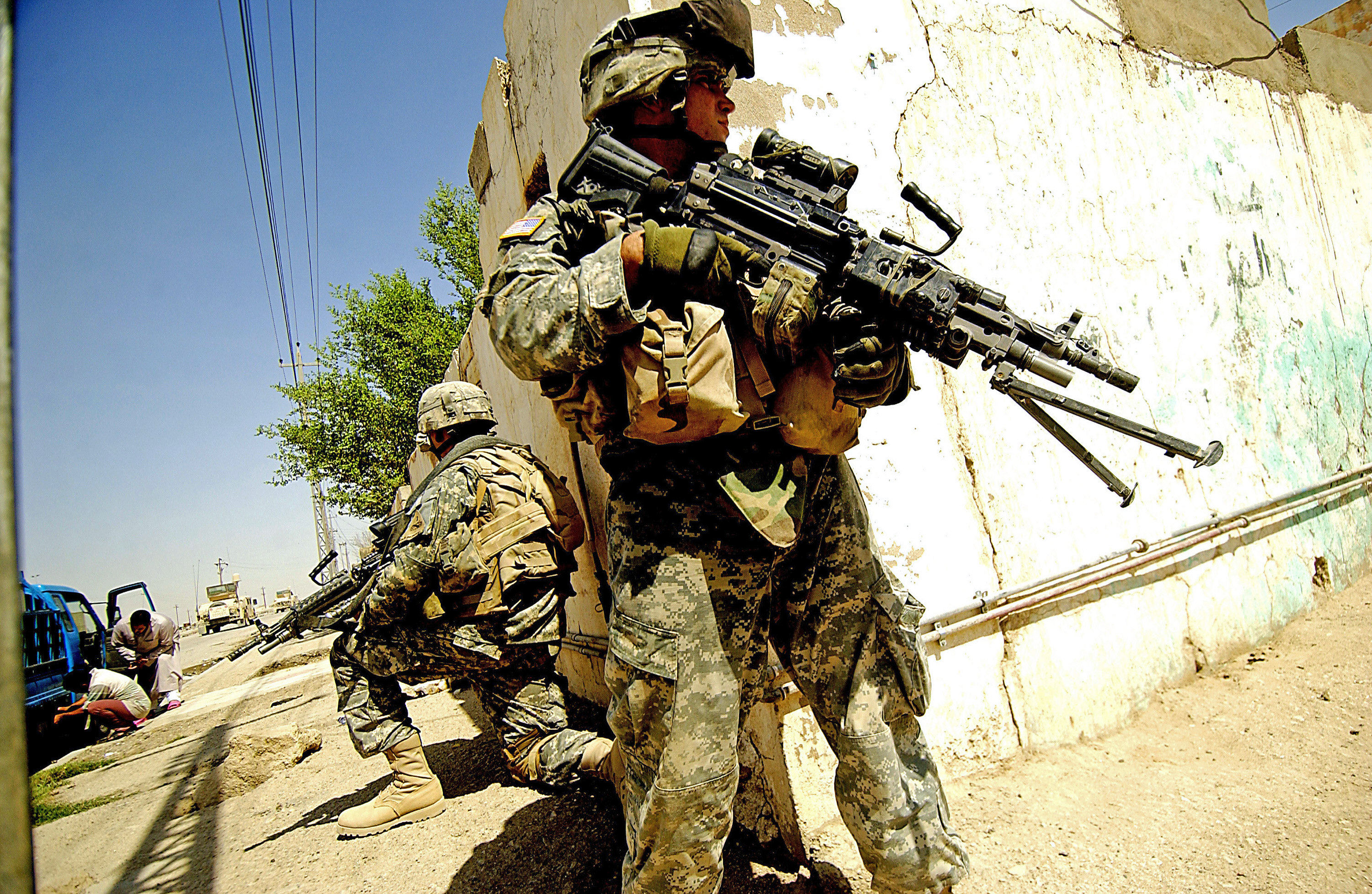
U.S. Army soldiers provide security for Iraqi civilians changing a flat tire on their civilian vehicle in Ramadi, 16 August 2006

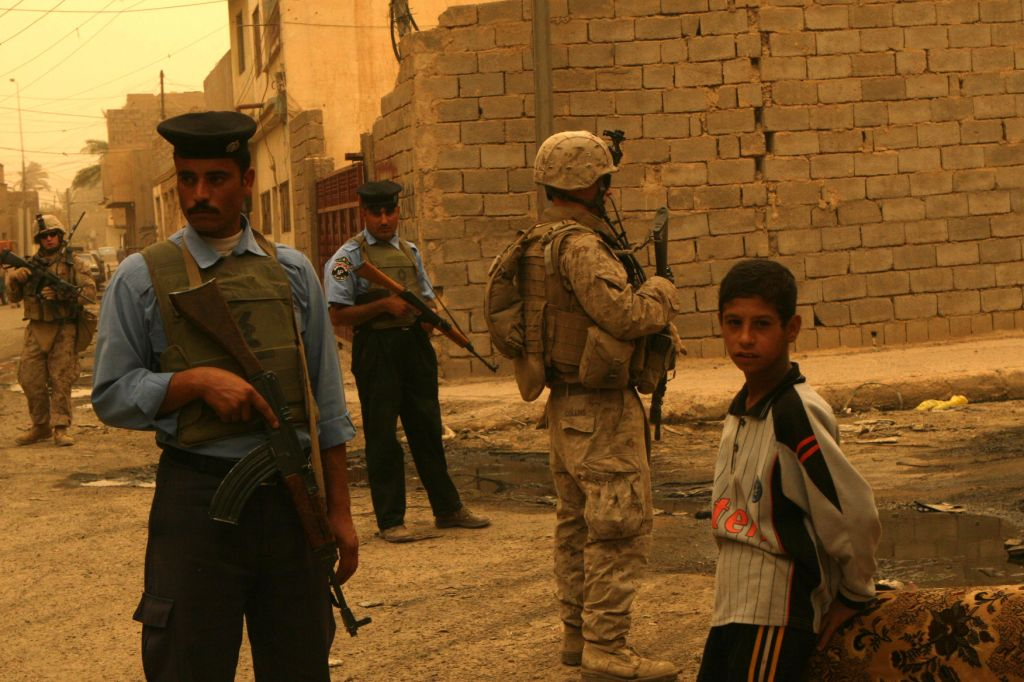
U.S. Marines conduct a joint foot patrol with Iraqi policemen, 9 June 2008

Ramadi, the capital of Iraq's Al Anbar Governorate, was under U.S. military occupation during the Iraq War. It was a focal point of Iraqi insurgency, which erupted into open armed conflict in 2004 and in 2006, part of the Iraq War in Anbar Province. Operation Murfreesboro was a U.S. offensive in February 2007 intended to cut off the Ma'Laab district of eastern Ramadi from the rest of the town in order to drive out Zarqawi's Al-Qaeda in Iraq.

To the north and west, Ramadi is bounded by the Euphrates River, while to the east and south it gradually disappears into suburbs. Ramadi is also the location of the Ramadi Barrage, which diverts water from the Euphrates River into Lake Habbaniyah.

U.S. units were largely restricted to a handful of small bases. The headquarters base, in the northern corner of Ramadi, is on the grounds of one of two Saddam-era palaces in the city; known first as Tactical Assembly Area Rifles and later as Camp Blue Diamond, this base was turned over to the Iraqi Army in the winter of 2008. At the other end of the stretch of Highway 10 that runs through Ramadi is another Saddam-era palace used as a Combat Outpost by a unit from the Florida National Guard. Several smaller buildings along Highway 10 between the two larger bases are routinely occupied by U.S. and Iraqi units, and just outside the city, there are a number of other, less dangerous and better-equipped camps, where an Army brigade headquarters and its support units were based.

== Al-Tash refugee camp ==
Al-Tash was a UNHCR-administered refugee camp in Iraq, described as being outside the city of Ramadi in western Iraq. In 2003, it was described as having 13,000 men, women, and children. In 2003, Human Rights Watch visited the camp, finding that some residents had lived there since as early as 1982, when they had been removed from border areas of Iran occupied by Iraq during the Iran–Iraq War.

== March–July 2003 ==
The 3rd Armored Cavalry Regiment was the first American military unit to reach Ramadi, arriving in early May 2003. The 3rd ACR's headquarters was located at the Rifles Base, which by July had hundreds of laborers from around the world working around the clock to construct a dining hall and recreation area for American forces.

Other American units initially stationed in Ramadi were:

- Company C, 2nd Battalion, 325th Airborne Infantry Regiment, which utilized the former presidential palace in Ramadi as its headquarters and faced repeated mortar attacks.
- Bravo Company, 1st Battalion, 124th Infantry Regiment, Florida National Guard: Initially based downtown at a government building nicknamed "the Mayor's Cell," they were forced to move by a June 2003 local protest. Bravo Company thus relocated to a sandstone palace at the edge of the city.
- Headquarters and Headquarters Company, 1st Battalion, 124th Infantry Regiment, Florida National Guard: Fully occupied and developed the palace grounds to the South of Rifles base, adjacent to the Ramadi Barrage. The Battalion TOC was located here and was called “Hurricane Point” Alpha Company, “Wolfpack” 1/124 INF was also colocated in a barn area within the “Hurricane Point” compound.
- Bravo Company, 122nd Engineer Battalion, South Carolina National Guard: Also utilized the former presidential palace complex.
- Delta Detachment, 502d Personnel Services Battalion (attached to 3rd Armored Cavalry Regiment, both at that time out of Fort Carson, Colorado), provided human resources support to the Regiment while headquartered out of Ramadi.

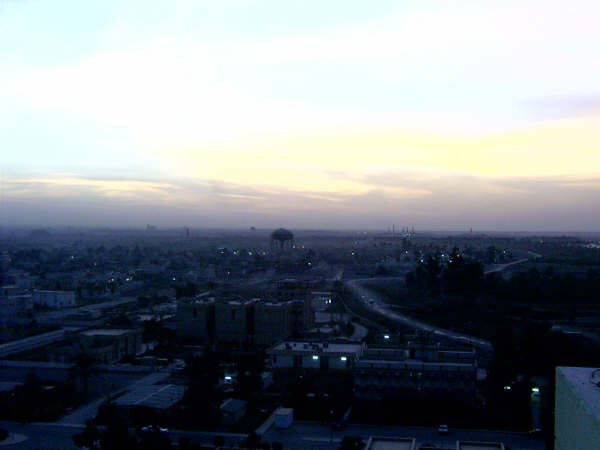
Ramadi in November 2003

- 212th Brigade 2/5th Field Artillery Fort Sill Oklahoma was in charge of Heavy Artillery support for 3rd Armored Cavalry Regiment. Was positioned at a Baath party university known as Al Anbar university.

=== Personnel killed in action ===
- Army Specialist Rafael L. Navea from Battery C, 2nd Battalion, 5th Field Artillery Regiment, was killed on August 27, 2003, when he was struck and killed by an Improvised Explosive Device (IED) and left behind his three children and wife Marina.

Other casualties from this unit included:

- Staff Sergeant Paul A. Velasquez from San Diego. He left behind wife Mary, son David, daughter Kristi, his daughter Brianna whom he never met and his mother Mary Elizabeth Velasquez
- Sergeant Joe Nathan Wilson, age 30, from Copiah County, Mississippi. In his last act of honor, he saved the life of Joseph Milner, he grabbed Joseph and pulled him tight to his chest as the helicopter was going down. When the noise stopped, Joe asked Sergeant Wilson if he was okay but Sergeant Wilson shakes his head, he later died in a Kuwaiti hospital. He leaves behind wife Erica, a daughter and his mother Maxine Adams.
- Sergeant Keelan Moss, age 23, was born in Little Rock, AR and raised in Texas. He was one of the 16 soldiers who died when their Chinook was hit by a missile on November 2, 2003, near Fallujah, Iraq. He leaves behind his wife Jennifer Moss and daughter Marjani Natalya.
- Sergeant Ross A. Pennanen Shawnee, age 36, from Oklahoma. He leaves behind wife Linda and son Gage.
- Sergeant Joel Perez Rio Grande, age 25, from Puerto Rico. He is survived by his father Edwin Perez and his brothers Elvin, Michael and Leo.
- Specialist Steven D. Conover, age 21, from Wilmington, Ohio. He is survived by his father Michael Earley and his mother Lorraine Earley.

== February 2004 – April 2005 ==
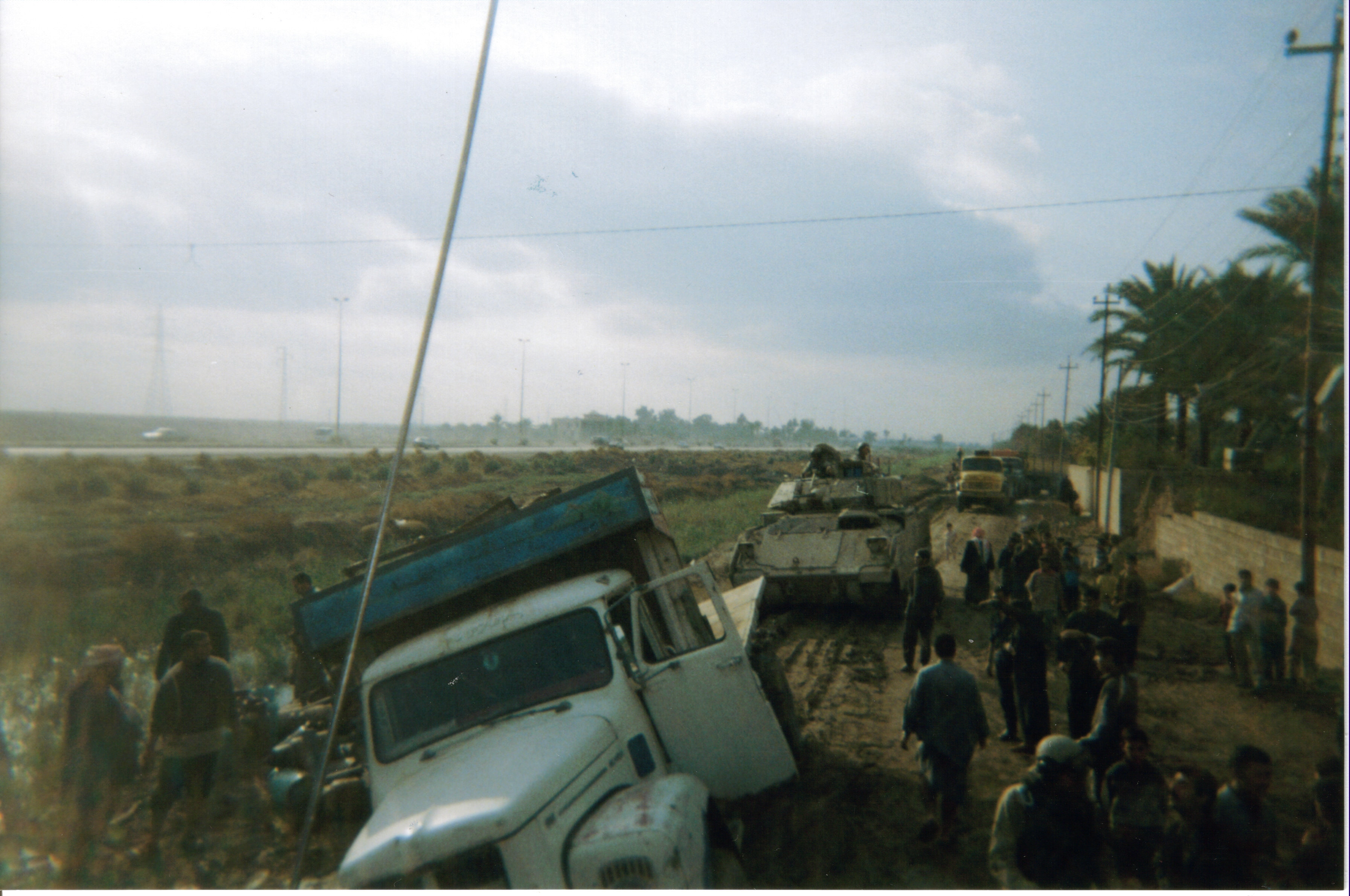
1BCT 1ID Soldiers during OIF 2

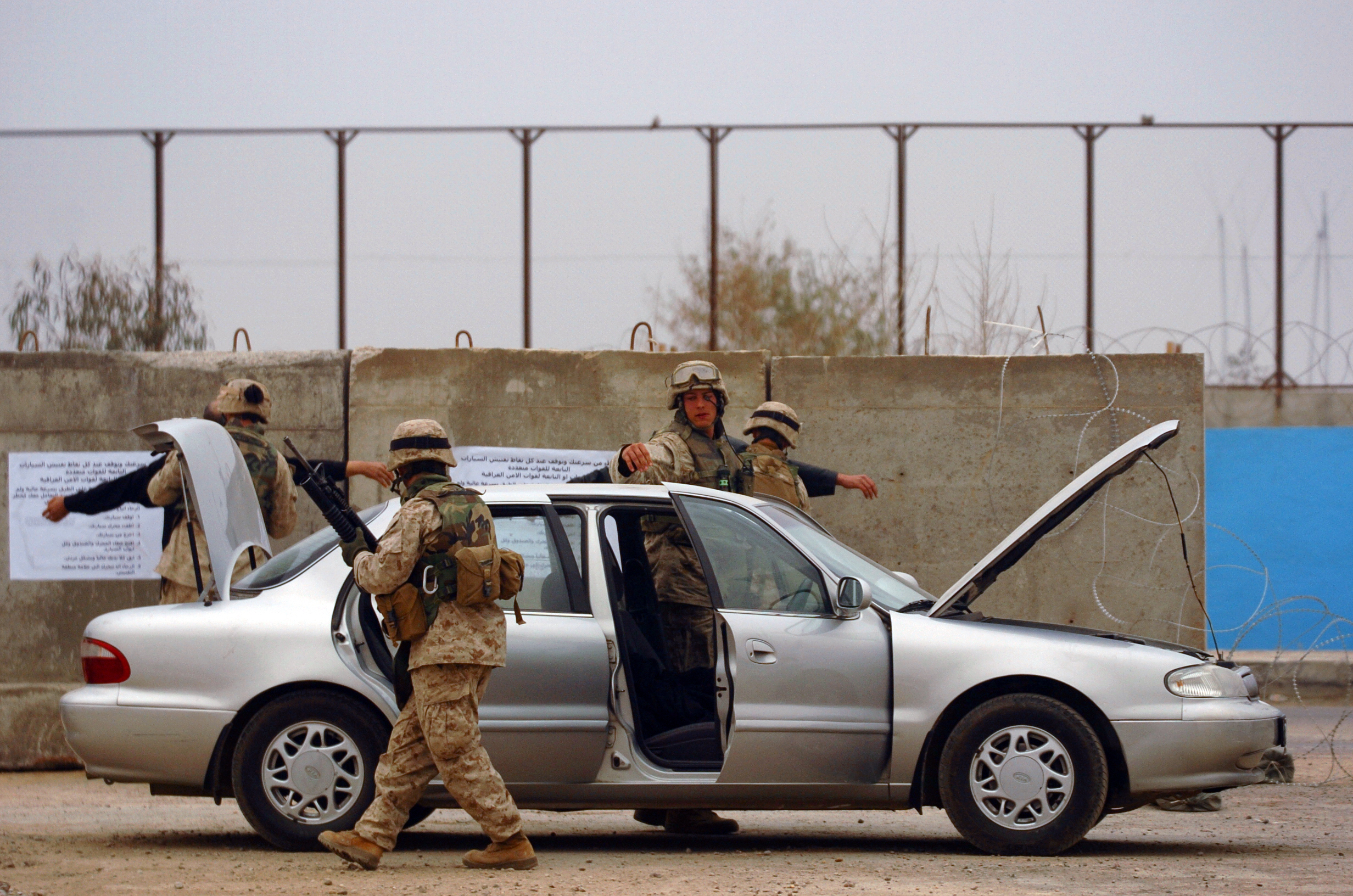
U.S. Marines check vehicles at a checkpoint, Ramadi, 20 February 2005

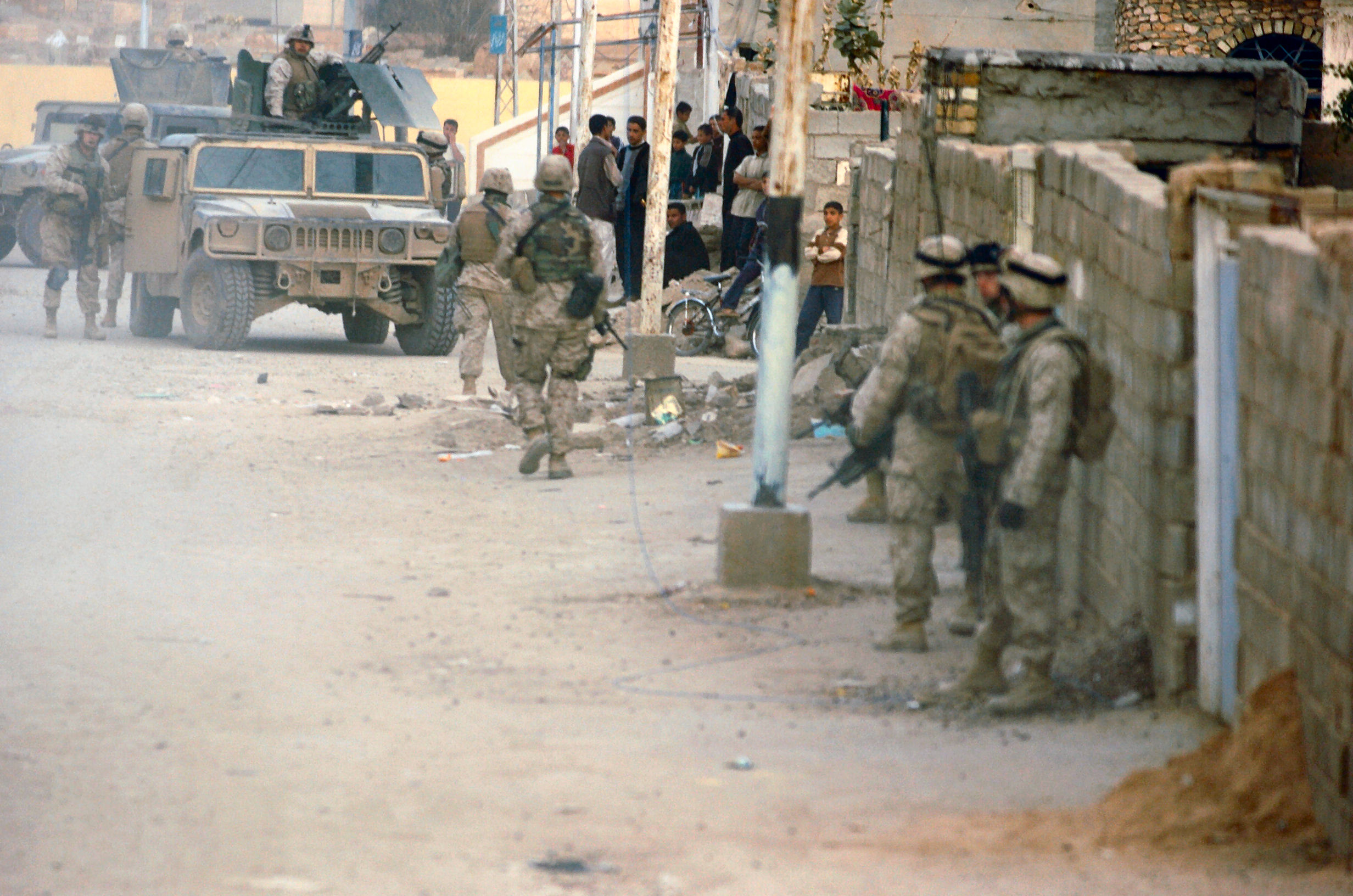
U.S. Marines prepare to conduct house calls in Ramadi, 18 February 2005

The 3rd ACR departed Ramadi in September 2003, handing it over to the 1st Brigade Combat Team, 1st Infantry Division (1st BCT, 1st ID) of Fort Riley, Kansas; however, until March, the 1st BCT fell under the command of the 82nd Airborne Division. In March, the 1st Marine Division deployed to Anbar, replacing the 82nd. While Army units in Iraq complete year-long tours, Marine units stay for seven months; in Ramadi, one Marine battalion typically augments an Army brigade.

During the first half of 2004, 1st BCT's two battalions (1–16th Infantry, 1–34th Armor) were augmented by the 2nd Battalion 4th Marines (2/4) and 3rd Battalion 11th Marines (3/11). When 2/4 and 3/11 left in September and October, they handed their sector of Ramadi over to the 2nd Battalion 5th Marines (2/5)2nd Battalion 11th marines were also deployed during this time to Ar Ramadi, who completed their tour in April 2005, then 1st Battalion 5th Marines (1/5) took over.

The spring of 2004 was particularly bloody in Ramadi. In the opening days of the rebellion that began in April 2004, and which was dominated by the siege of Fallujah, 2/4 suffered one of the deadliest attacks of the war, losing 12 Marines in a single day, April 6, 2004. During this time, with most of the 1st Marine Division's resources focused on Fallujah, 2nd Battalion 4th Marines (2/4) and 3rd Battalion 11th Marines (3/11) were left with the burden of controlling Ramadi.

For the most part, the four battalions occupying the Ramadi-Fallujah corridor (including the insurgent den of Khaldiyah) hunkered down and defended what ground they already held along the city's central thoroughfare. The remainder of the month was also costly for insurgent groups: between 800 and 1000 were killed in running battles with the Marines, and the 1–16 Infantry.

== April 2005 – April 2006 ==
Marine and Army units in Ramadi rotate on overlapping schedules; thus, just as 1 BCT 1ID arrived well before the 1st Marine Division officially began OIF 2, so the 2nd Brigade, 2nd Infantry Division (2-2 ID) arrived in August 2004, while the 1st Marine Division was still in charge of Anbar. Working first with the Marines from 2/5 and later with their replacements, 1/5 (who in turn were replaced by the 3rd Battalion 7th Marines (3/7)), the 2-2 ID's five battalions (the 1–9th Infantry, 2–17th Field Artillery, 1–503rd Infantry, 44th Engineer Battalion, and 1–506th Infantry augment by 28 ID 876th En Bn Combat Engineer Platoon) continued the previous units' work until August 2005. In August 2005, a Provisional Infantry Battalion made up of Artillery Marines from 2nd Battalion, HQ 10th Marines & Lima Battery, 3rd Battalion, 10th Marines, took over base security, SASO (Security And Stability Operations) & Force Protection Operations for Camp Blue Diamond in Ramadi, while also conducting continuous Combat Patrols & House-to-House Searches within the Camps surrounding AO in the Northern part of the city to disrupt enemy activity & recover weapon caches. Squads from 2/10 would also rotate on a regular basis to help support Marine Units tasked with defending al Anbar's Provincial Government Center located within the heart of Downtown Ramadi, a high priority target for the enemy. Convoy Security during transportation of currency & VIP'S to & from the site was also provided by 2/10 Marines. 2/10 was relieved in February 2006 & turned over control to the Army's 1st Battalion, 35th Armor (Task force Conqueror). Eventually, the Iraqi Army's 7th Infantry Division would officially take control of Camp Blue Diamond on May 9, 2006.

In April 2005, HHC and B Company 983 Engineer BN (Combat Heavy) were removed from FOB Speicher in order to support 2ID in construction operations. Quality of life improvements of both American forces as well as ISF. CoB 983 supported many construction operations in East Ramadi as well as Blue Diamond and Hurricane Point.

During this period the brigade and the Marine battalions that worked with it continued to suffer steady casualties. Unlike the mechanized 1BCT 1ID, 2-2 ID was mostly a light-infantry brigade (1–9 Infantry is a mechanized infantry battalion), whose only tanks came from one company (Death Dealer Company) of the 2–72nd Armor.

The 2–28th BCT was reinforced further in July, with the 2–69th Armor HHC Co., Able Co. and Delta Co, a combat-experienced 3rd Infantry Division unit, being sent to it from Baqubah. The 2–69th Armor remained in Ramadi until January. During September 2005, the 2–28th BCT suffered casualties as insurgent groups were pushed downriver by Marine offensives near Al Qaim and in the area around Haditha. Marine and 3rd Infantry division units that replaced the 503rd and 1/5 were doing the majority of rigorous counter-insurgency in the City center The 3rd Bn 172nd Cav from the VT National Guard was at FOB Ramadi during the Iraqi Election period however their exact rotation dates and mission is unclear to this poster.

Among the Army Combat Support units in Ramadi during this period were 2nd Platoon, 51st Transportation Company (convoy escort M1114 HMMWVs and M1070 PLS systems) from Mannheim Germany, 2nd Platoon, 2nd Military Police Company as well as HHC and B Company, 983rd Engineer Combat Battalion (Heavy), and US Naval Mobile Construction Battalion 5, who greatly improved quality of life and force protection at American and Iraqi camps, as well as providing security and support for the first democratic elections and the subsequently elected government in Ramadi.

The 224th Combat Engineer Battalion (Iowa Army National Guard) served as the Divisional Engineer Battalion, conducting route clearance operations in support of first the 1st Marine Division from January – March 2005, and then to the 2nd Marine Division from March – December 2005, when it was replaced by the 54th Engineer Battalion, a component of the 130th Engineer Brigade, V Corps based in Germany. The 54th remained in Ramadi until October 2006 and suffered six fatalities.

== April–May 2006 ==
2-2 ID was replaced by the Pennsylvania National Guard's 2nd Brigade Combat Team, 28th Infantry Division (2–28th BCT). When it arrived in August 2005 beside the Marines of 3/7, the 2–28th BCT came equipped for heavy fighting; it brought six battalions rather than three (3–103rd Armor, 1–104th Cavalry, 1–109th Infantry, 1–110th Infantry, 1–172nd Armor) (actually made up of one company of Mountain Infantry and a single company of tanks) and 876 Engineer Battalion, all of which were "heavy" units equipped with tanks and Bradley fighting vehicles, and were filled in with Troop A 1–167 Cavalry of the Nebraska Army National Guard for their Brigade Quick Reaction Force (QRF) and Personal Security Detail (PSD) units. The 1–167th Cavalry also provided local security for EOD units during counter-IED operations. The 2–222nd FA from the Utah Army National Guard provided counterfire, base defense and route security as well, firing over 4,000 rounds of artillery during the one-year tour. They were the first National Guard unit to fire the Paladin weapon system in combat operations. .

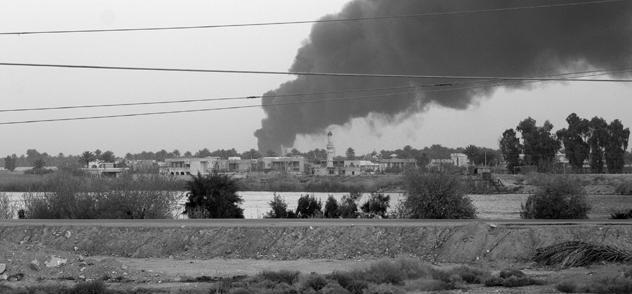
A smoke plume caused by an insurgent attack on the government center in downtown Ramadi, 13 March 2006

In March 2006, as 3rd Battalion 8th Marines arrived to replace 3/7, violence again began to escalate in Ramadi, with U.S. casualties spiking. With the 2–69th gone, the 2–28th BCT was again reinforced to help damp the insurgent activity. This time by the 1–506th Infantry, who arrived in December 2005 as a unit of the 101st Airborne Division that was transferred to Ramadi from Baghdad's Sadr City.

During March 2006 two soldiers from the 75th Ranger Regiment were killed in Ramadi, possibly indicating that elements of the secretive Task Force 145 (which later helped to kill Abu Musab al-Zarqawi) were present in the city. Additionally, at least 200 insurgents were killed by Army Ranger and 101st Airborne units during the month of April.

== June–November 2006 ==
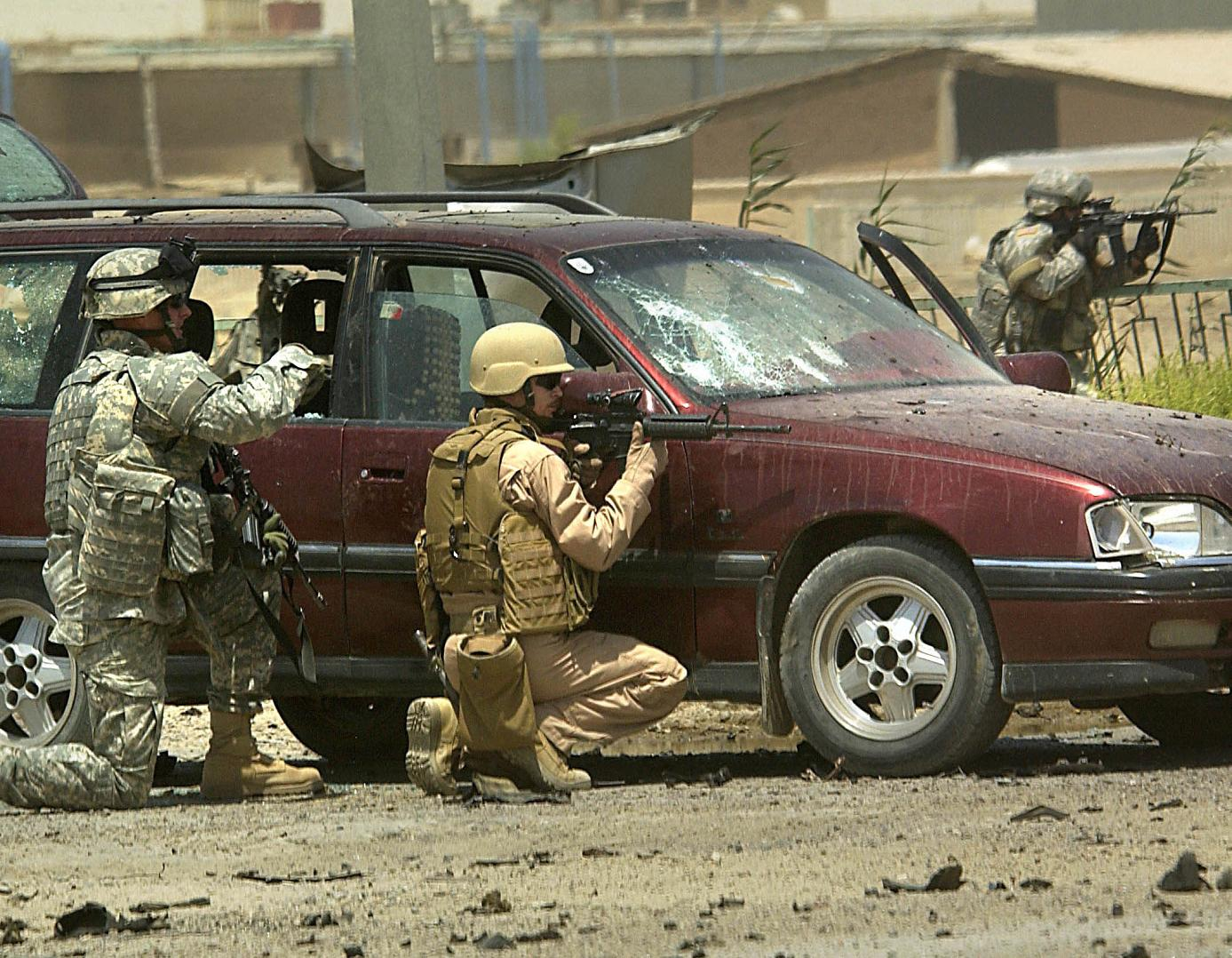
U.S. Army soldiers and Iraqi Security Forces in Ramadi, 10 August 2006

As the summer of 2006 arrived, the level of attacks in Ramadi remained the highest in the country. As a result, rumors of an impending Fallujah-style assault sprang up in the Arab media.

In early June 2006, 2nd Brigade Combat Team, 28th Infantry Division completed its year long deployment and the 1st Brigade Combat Team, 1st Armored Division was shifted from Tal Afar in northern Iraq to replace them. 2nd Battalion, 37th Armored Regiment remained in Tal Afar. To reinforce the 1st BCT, 1st Armored Division, General Casey ordered the deployment of two of his three strategic reserve battalions from the 2nd Brigade Combat Team, 1st Armored Division (the 1–6th Infantry and 1–35th Armor, along with A & C Companies of the 40th Engineer Battalion.)

On June 18, 2006, the 1st BCT, 1st Armored Division launched its offensive. Despite fears that the assault would be a repeat of the Marine offensive in Fallujah, the brigade took a different approach, discouraging residents from fleeing and moving in slowly with much more limited use of heavy weapons such as Abrams tanks, artillery, and close air support. As the offensive opened, two columns of U.S. mechanized troops pushed north into the city's suburbs with Iraqi Army units, cutting off two major entrances to the city for the first time during the war.

Meanwhile, 3rd Battalion 8th Marines held onto the western half of the downtown area and patrolled the river and its two bridges (the only northbound exits from the city) on foot and in boats; The 1–506th Infantry, 1–6th Infantry, 1–35th Armor and 40th Engineers continued to hold the main thoroughfare and the eastern exits. As the operation began, there was controversy over the number of refugees who left the city despite the U.S. military's assurances that the offensive would be of a very different character than the Fallujah assault of 2004.

1st BCT, 1st AD and elements of the 2nd BCT, 1st AD proceeded to establish a series of mutually supporting Combat Outposts occupied by US and Iraqi forces both inside and outside the city. These outposts put increasing pressure on Al Qaeda and other insurgent groups operating throughout the city. US Forces along with their Iraqi Army counterparts brought the fight to Al Qaeda by conducting operations directly from these outposts and providing watch and security over key supply routes throughout the city.

U.S. Army Sgt. McCool shot by an Iraqi insurgent sniper in Ramadi, 16 August 2006

According to Colonel MacFarland, "These [COPs] have had a very disruptive effect on the enemy. Most importantly, though, it's given us the opportunity to engage the people of Ramadi. ... And we've established real relationships with the people in parts of the city that we hadn't been able to in the past".

Throughout July, insurgents operating in multiple platoon strength units consistently attacked the Combat Outposts with small arms, RPG, and indirect fire as US troops established additional COPs deeper into Ramadi neighborhoods. These attacks culminated in a citywide battle on July 24 during which insurgents suffered heavy casualties after being beaten back.

In mid September 2006, 1st Battalion 6th Marines took over the AO of Downtown Ramadi. The Battalion conducted several crucial missions along with the security and construction of numerous security stations throughout the downtown area. This was a crucial step in the deterring of IED attacks, IRL attacks and increasing the ability to conduct patrols in the Sook and NE corner of their AO. 1/6's progress and continuous pressure began to force out the city's insurgents and allowed the formation of a current and functional Iraqi Police force and Iraqi National Guard unit. 1st Battalion 6th Marines was extended in the 2006/2007 surge of 30,000 troops to the Al Anbar province. This allowed the battalion to continue to regulate and patrol the once "deadliest city in the world" and allow other Iraqi cities to begin the movement towards stability and away from insurgency.

== December 2006 – December 2007 ==
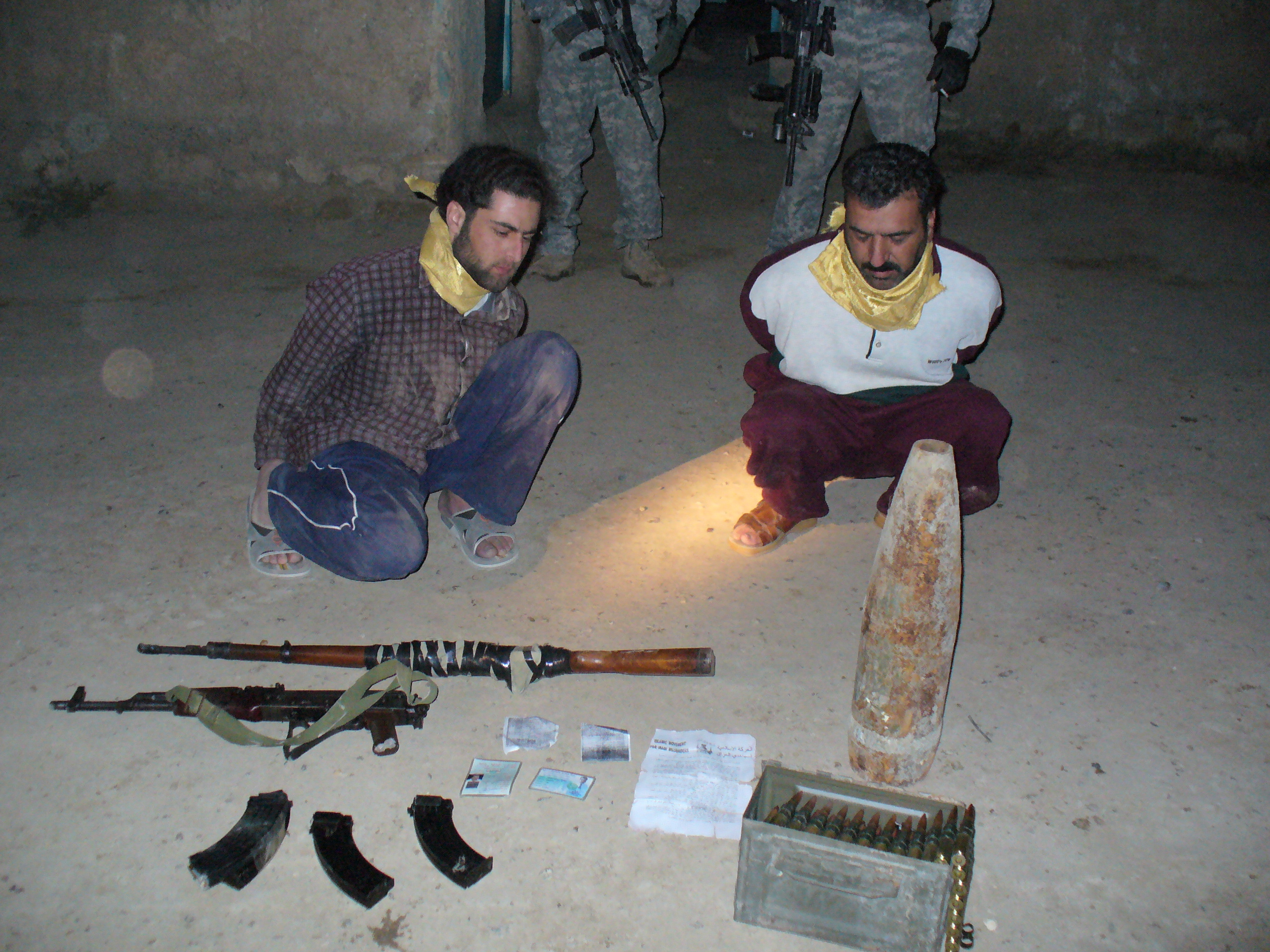
Captured insurgents (December 2006).

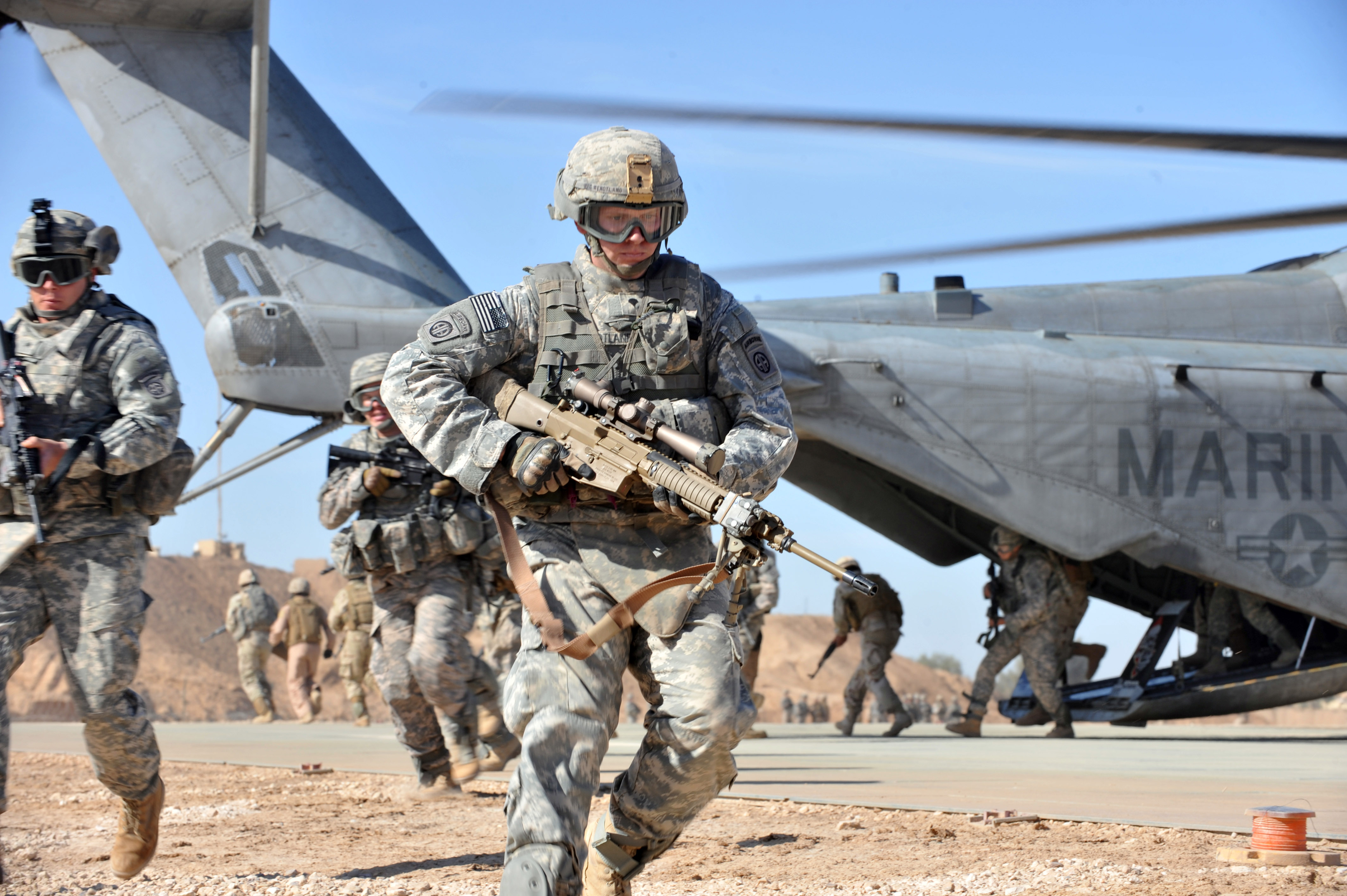
Camp Ramadi, 15 November 2009

After the first 2004 tour in Ramadi, 503rd Infantry Regiment, reflagged to 1–9 Infantry, deployed back to Ramadi in October 2006. In the beginning months of 2007, 1st Battalion 9th Infantry Regiment of the 2nd Infantry Division, with support from 3rd Battalion, 69th Armor Regiment of the 3rd Infantry Division, Bravo Company of the 1st Battalion, 26th Infantry Regiment of the 1st Infantry Division(The Blue Spaders), Navy SEALs Navy ESF and 1/1/1 Iraqi Army with Route clearance operations being conducted by TF Pathfinder 321st EN BN Sept 2006 – Sept 2007 for Ramadi, Fallujah up Al Assad to the Syria Border], launched an offensive in East Ramadi, Operation Murfreesboro. The operation was intended to cut off the Ma'Laab district from the rest of Ramadi in order to drive out the AQIZ.

In February 2007, the operation had successfully divided the district by setting up a concrete wall barrier. There were more than 40 engagements, 8 large weapons caches found, about 55 IEDs exploded or found, 70 insurgents killed, 10 wounded, and 32 detained. The success of this operation led to the forming of the Ramadi Police Force which worked alongside U.S. military and Iraqi Army. 1–9 Infantry worked with the head sheikh in the Sofia district and secured valuable intelligence throughout their campaign in Ramadi.

== See also ==
- Iraq War in Anbar Province
