= Battle of Tinian order of battle =

== United States ==
All units and personnel are USMC unless otherwise noted.

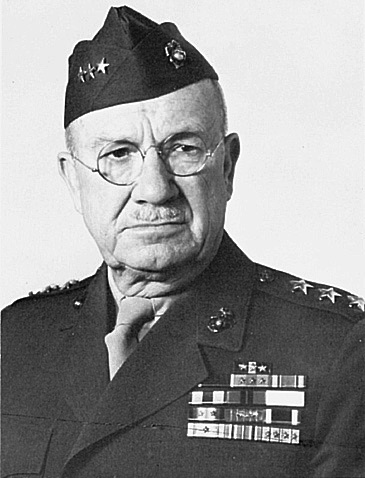
Lieutenant General Holland M. Smith

Expeditionary Troops (Lieutenant General Holland M. Smith)

Chief of Staff: Brigadier General Graves B. Erskine

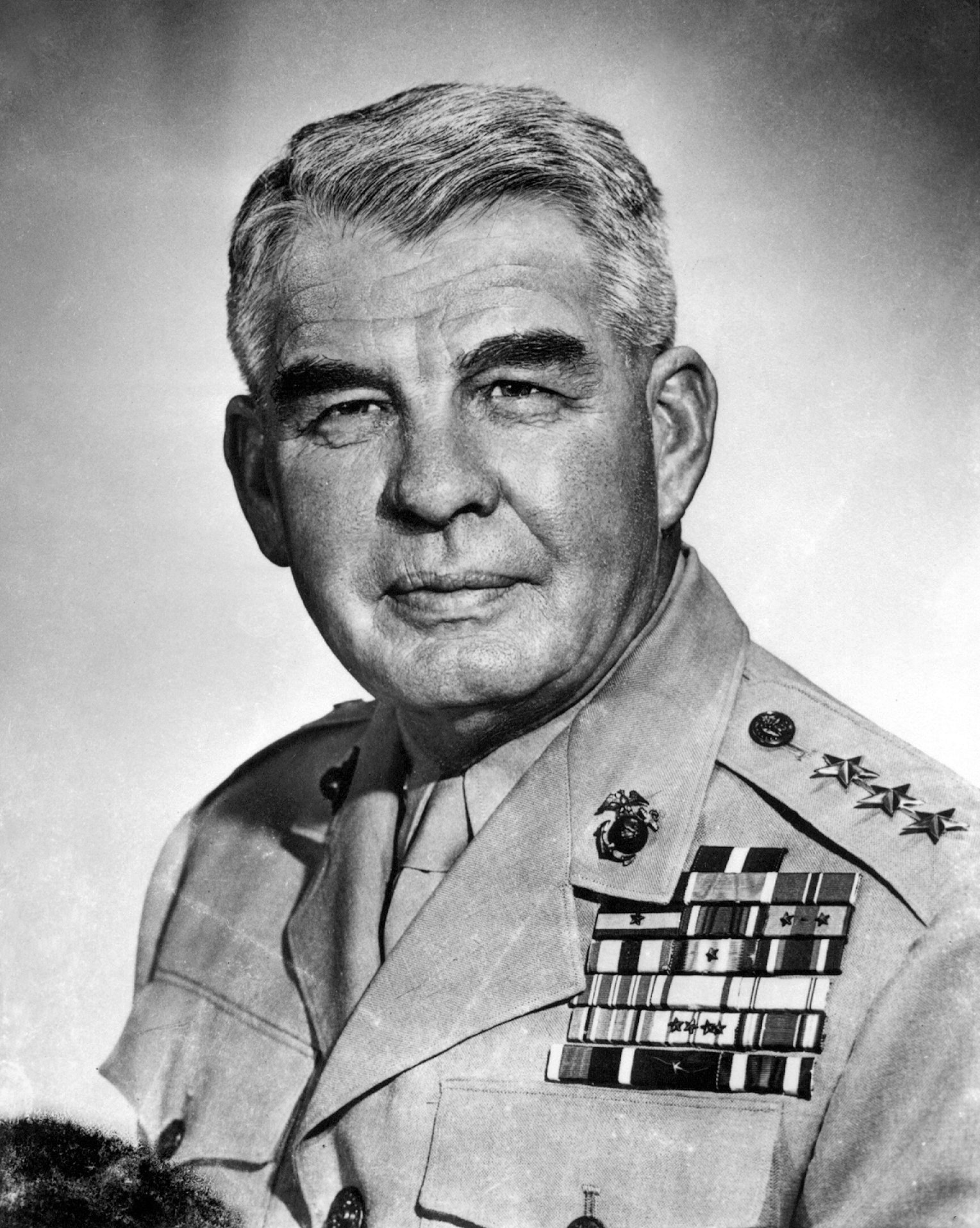
Major General Harry Schmidt (as a lieutenant general)

V Amphibious Corps (Harry Schmidt)

Chief of Staff: Brigadier General Graves B. Erskine

V Amphibious Corps Headquarters and Service Battalion (Major Thomas R. Wert)
V Amphibious Corps Amphibious Reconnaissance Battalion (Captain James L. Jones)
V Amphibious Corps Medical Battalion (Lieutenant Commander William B. Clapp (USN))
V Amphibious Corps Signal Battalion (Colonel James H. N. Hudnall)
V Amphibious Corps Motor Transport Company
V Amphibious Corps Provisional Engineer Group

18th Naval Construction Battalion (USN)
121st Naval Construction Battalion (USN)
34th Engineer Combat battalion (USA)

2nd Armored Amphibian Battalion (Lieutenant Colonel Reed M. Fawell Jr.)
4th 105mm Howitzer Battalion (Lieutenant Colonel Douglas E. Reeve)
17th Anti-Aircraft Artillery Battalion
7th Field Depot (Colonel Earle H. Phillips)

3rd Ammunition Company
18th Depot Company
19th Depot Company
20th Depot Company

31st Field Hospital (USA)
96th Provisional Portable Surgical Hospital (USA)
97th Provisional Portable Surgical Hospital (USA)
98th Provisional Portable Surgical Hospital (USA)
Air Warning Squadron 5
Detachment, 680th Air Warning Company (USA)
Detachment, 726th Air Warning Company (USA)
Detachment, 763th Air Warning Company (USA)
Detachment, Mobile Communications Unit No. 18, Group Pacific 6 (USN)
Northern Troops and Landing Force Shore Party (Colonel Cyril W. Martyr)
Attached units

XXIV Corps Artillery (Brigadier General Arthur M. Harper) (USA)

419th Field Artillery Group (USA)

145th Field Artillery Battalion (USA)
225th Field Artillery Battalion (USA)

420th Field Artillery Group (USA)

531st Field Artillery Battalion (USA)
532nd Field Artillery Battalion (USA)

Provisional Anti-Aircraft Artillery Group (USA)

864th Aircraft Warning Anti-Aircraft Battalion (USA)
Battery A, 751st Anti-Aircraft Battalion (USA)
Battery B, 751st Anti-Aircraft Battalion (USA)

27th Infantry Division Artillery (Brigadier General Richmond F. Kernan) (USA)

104th Field Artillery Battalion (Lieutenant Colonel George P. Van Nostrand) (USA)
105th Field Artillery Battalion (Lieutenant Colonel Nicholas D. La Morte) (USA)
106th Field Artillery Battalion (Lieutenant Colonel John J. Fitzgerald) (USA)
249th Field Artillery Battalion (Lieutenant Colonel Dwight McCallum) (USA)

477th Amphibious Truck Company (USA)

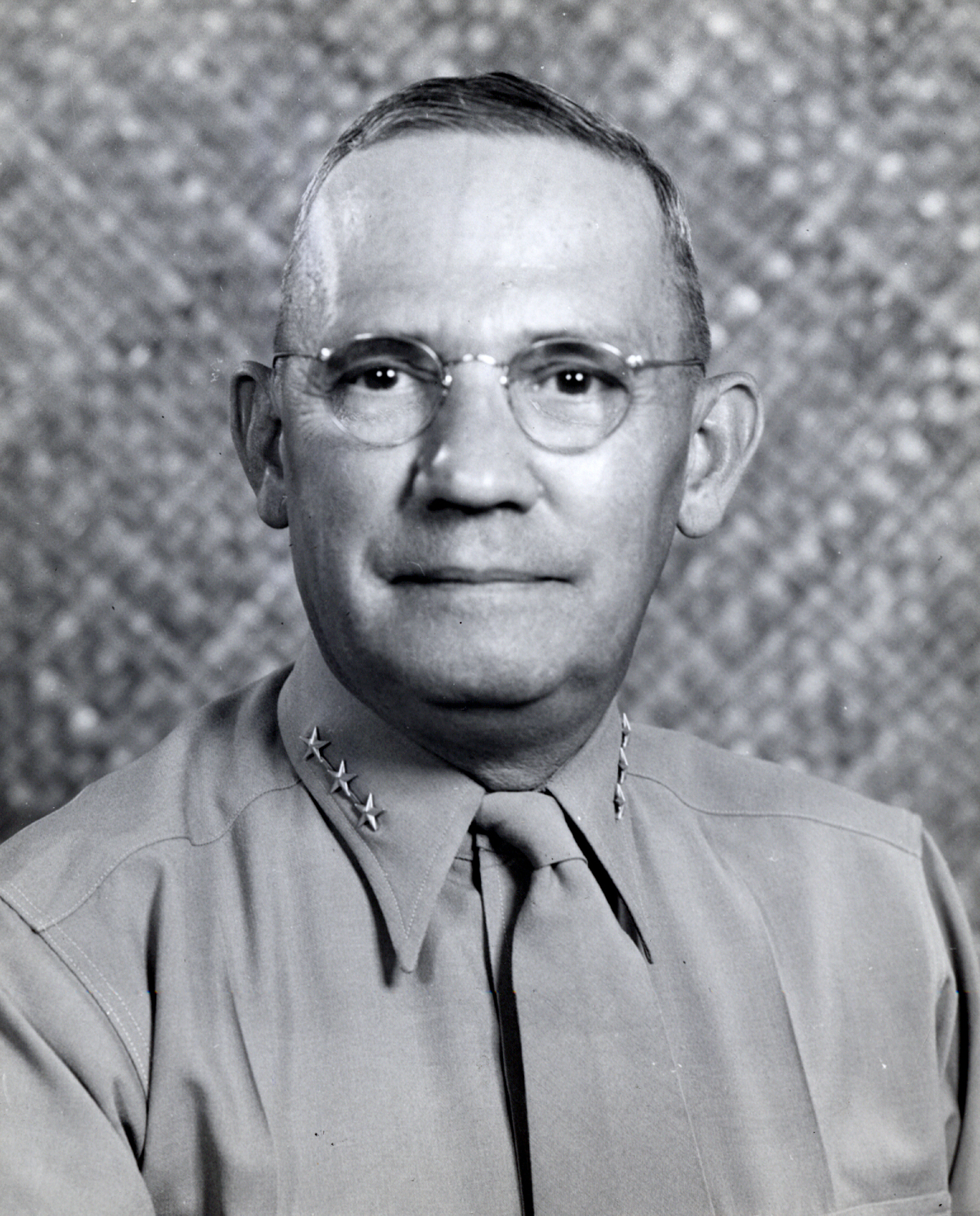
Major General Thomas E. Watson (as a lieutenant general)

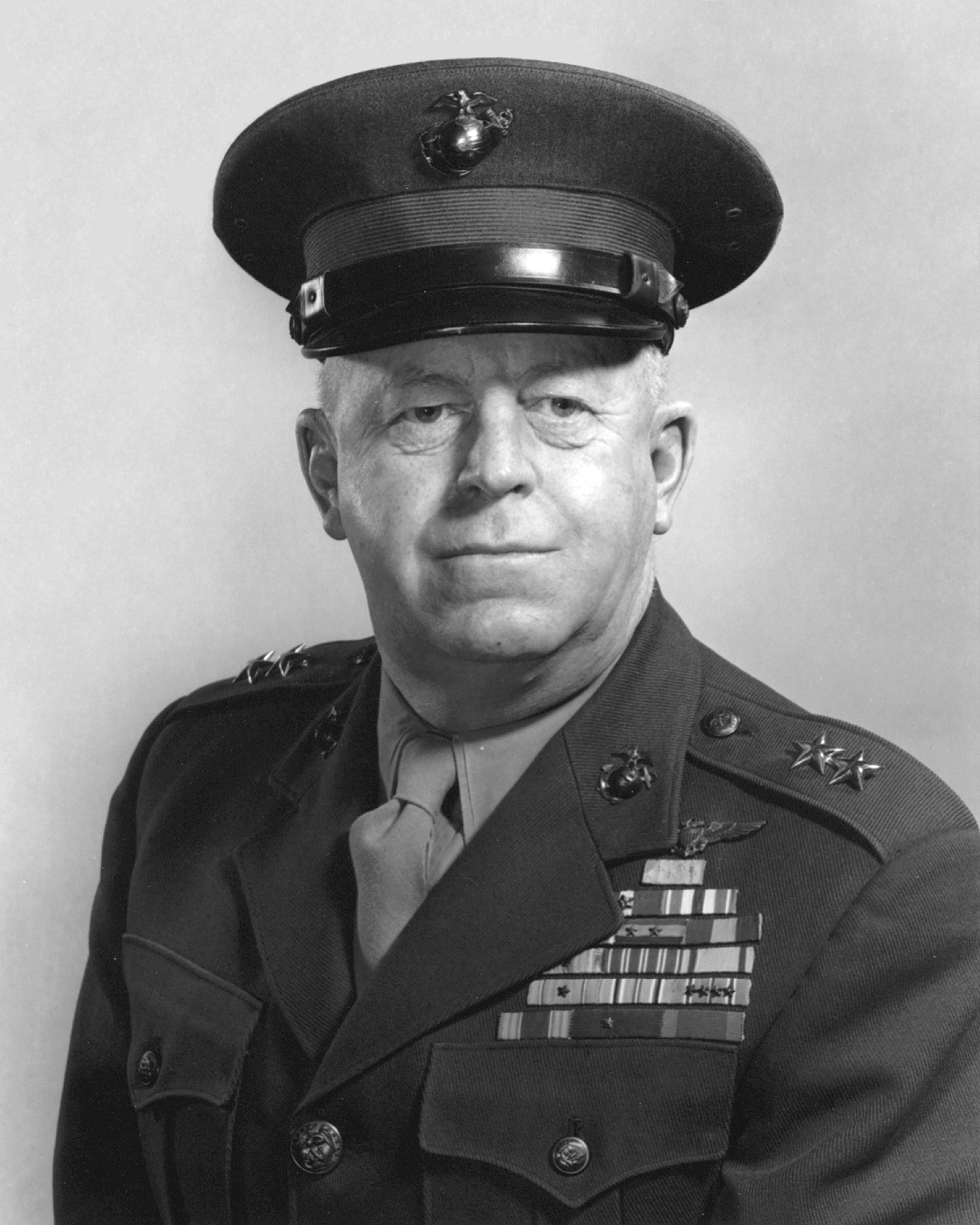
Brigadier General Merritt A. Edson (as a major general)

2nd Marine Division (Major General Thomas E. Watson)

Assistant Division Commander: Brigadier General Merritt A. Edson
Chief of Staff: Colonel David M. Shoup

2nd Marine Regiment (Colonel Walter J. Stuart)

1st Battalion (Lieutenant Colonel Wood B. Kyle)
2nd Battalion (Lieutenant Colonel Richard C. Nutting)
3rd Battalion (Lieutenant Colonel Arnold F. Johnston)

6th Marine Regiment (Colonel James P. Riseley)

1st Battalion (Lieutenant Colonel William K. Jones)
2nd Battalion (Lieutenant Colonel Raymond L. Murray)
3rd Battalion ( †Lieutenant Colonel John W. Easley; Major John E. Rentsch from 2 August 1944)

8th Marine Regiment (Colonel Clarence R. Wallace)

1st Battalion (Lieutenant Colonel Lawrence C. Hays Jr.)
2nd Battalion (Lieutenant Colonel Henry P. Crowe)
3rd Battalion (Lieutenant Colonel John C. Miller Jr.)

10th Marine Regiment (Artillery) (Colonel Raphael Griffin)

1st Battalion (Lieutenant Colonel Presley M. Rixey)
2nd Battalion (Lieutenant Colonel George R. E. Shell)
3rd Battalion (Major William L. Crouch)
4th Battalion (Lieutenant Colonel Kenneth A. Jorgensen)

18th Marine Regiment (Engineer) (Lieutenant Colonel Ewart S. Laue (Note: The 18th Marines were commanded by Colonel Cyril W. Martyr, but he was on temporary duty at V Amphibious Corps headquarters as commander of the Northern Troops and Landing Force Shore Party, so Laue, his executive officer, acted as commanding officer.))

1st Battalion, 18th Marines (Lieutenant Colonel August L. Vogt)
2nd Battalion, 18th Marines (Lieutenant Colonel Chester J. Salazar)

2nd Medical Battalion (Lieutenant Commander Claude R. Bruner (USN))
2nd Motor Transport Battalion (Major Milton J. Green)
2nd Service Battalion (Major Edward V. Dozier)
2nd Tank Battalion (Major Charles W. McCoy)
2nd Amphibian Tractor Battalion (Major Fenlon L. Durand)
5th Amphibian Tractor Battalion (Major George L. Shead)
Attached units

1st Amphibious Truck Company
715th Amphibian Tractor Battalion (USA)
2nd 155mm Artillery Battalion
1st Provisional Rocket Detachment
2nd Joint Assault Signal Company (USA)
Underwater Demolition Team 5 (USN)

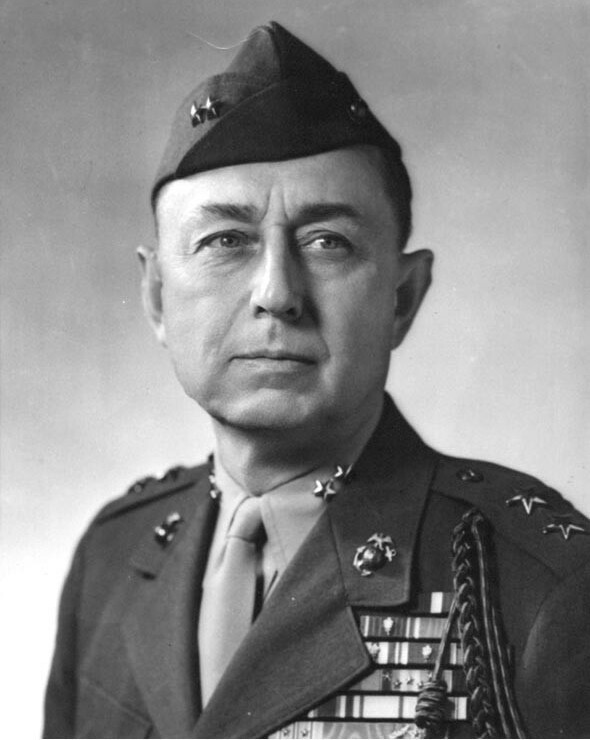
Major General Clifton B. Cates

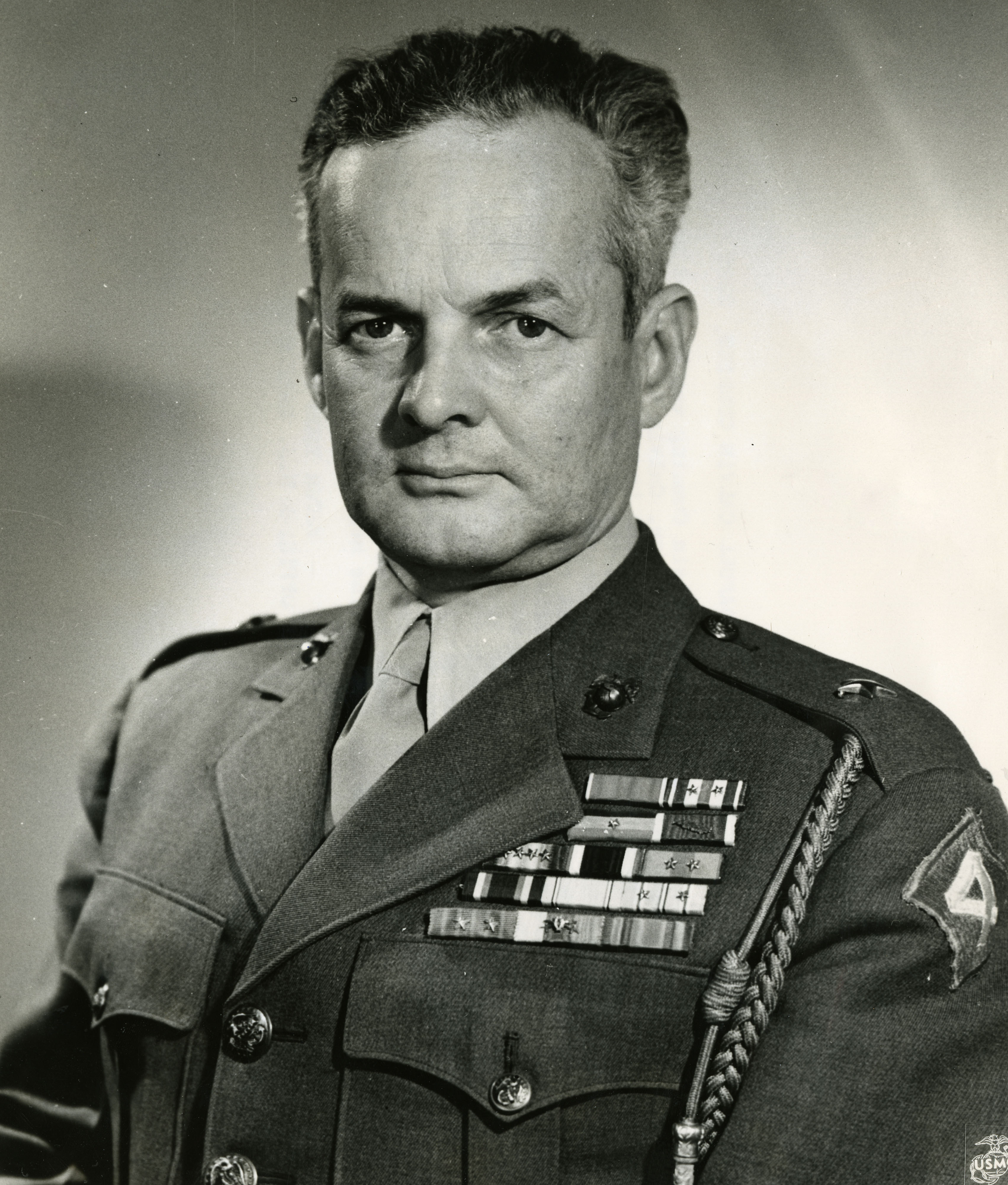
Brigadier General Samuel C. Cumming

4th Marine Division (Major General Clifton B. Cates)

Assistant Division Commander: Brigadier General Samuel C. Cumming
Chief of Staff: Colonel William W. Rogers

14th Marine Regiment (Artillery) (Colonel 'Louis G. DeHaven)

1st Battalion ( †Lieutenant Colonel Harry J. Zimmer; Major Clifford B. Drake from 25 July 1944)
2nd Battalion (Lieutenant Colonel George B. Wilson Jr.)
3rd Battalion (Major Robert E. MacFarlane)
4th Battalion (Lieutenant Colonel Carl A. Youngdale)

20th Marine Regiment (Engineer) (Lieutenant Colonel Nelson K. Brown)

1st Battalion (Engineers) (Major Richard G. Ruby)
2nd Battalion (Pioneers) (Major John H. Partridge)

23rd Marine Regiment (Colonel Louis R. Jones)

1st Battalion (Lieutenant Colonel Ralph Haas)
2nd Battalion (Lieutenant Colonel Edward J. Dillon)
3rd Battalion (Major Paul S. Treitel)

24th Marine Regiment (Colonel Franklin A. Hart)

1st Battalion (Lieutenant Colonel Otto Lessing)
2nd Battalion (Major Frank E. Garetson; Lieutenant Colonel Richard Rothwell from 27 July 1944)
3rd Battalion (Lieutenant Colonel Alexander A. Vandegrift Jr.)

25th Marine Regiment (Colonel Merton J. Batchelder)

1st Battalion (Lieutenant Colonel Hollis U. Mustain)
2nd Battalion (Lieutenant Colonel Lewis C. Hudson)
3rd Battalion (Lieutenant Colonel Justice M. Chambers)

4th Medical Battalion (Lieutenant Commander George W. Mast (USN))
4th Motor Transport Battalion (Lieutenant Colonel Ralph L. Scheisswohl)
4th Service Battalion (Colonel Richard H. Schubert)
4th Tank Battalion (Major Richard K. Schmidt)
10th Amphibian Tractor Battalion (Major Victor J. Croizat)
Attached units

Company C, 11th Amphibian Tractor Battalion
534th Amphibian Tractor Battalion (USA)
708th Amphibian Tank Battalion (USA)
773rd Amphibian Tractor Battalion (USA)
1st Joint Assault Signal Company (USA)
2nd Amphibious Truck Company
311th Port Company (USA)
539th Port Company (USA)
1st Provisional Rocket Detachment
Underwater Demolition Team 7 (USN)

== Japan ==
=== Imperial Japanese Navy ===
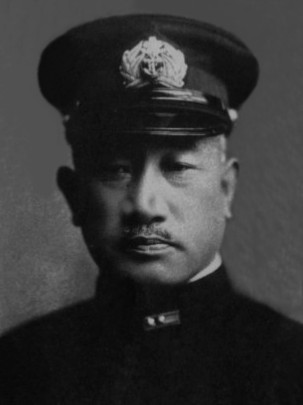
Vice Admiral Kakuji Kakuta

1st Air Fleet ( †Vice Admiral Kakuji Kakuta)

23rd Air Group
Hospital, 523rd Air Group
Construction Battalion, 523rd Air Group
116th Construction Battalion
833rd Construction Battalion

56th Naval Guard Force ( †Captain Goichi Oie)

82nd Anti-Aircraft Air Defense Unit †Kitchitaro Tanaka
83rd Anti-Aircraft Air Defense Unit †Meiki Tanaka
233rd Construction Battalion
Coastal Security Force

=== Imperial Japanese Army ===
50th Infantry Regiment ( †Colonel Kiyochi Ogata)

1st Battalion, 50th Infantry Regiment ( †Captain Matsuda)
2nd Battalion, 50th Infantry Regiment ( †Captain Kamityama)
3rd Battalion, 50th Infantry Regiment ( †Captain Yamamoto)
Artillery Battalion, 50th Infantry Regiment ( †Major Katuro Kahi)
Signal Company, 50th Infantry Regiment ( †Lieutenant Hayashi)
Engineer Company, 50th Infantry Regiment ( †Lieutenant Chuichi Yano)
Supply Company, 50th Infantry Regiment ( †Lieutenant Kenishi Nozaki)
Medical Company, 50th Infantry Regiment ( †Lieutenant Masaakira Narizawa)
Antitank Platoon, 50th Infantry Regiment ( †Second Lieutenant Moto Otani)
Fortification Detachment, 50th Infantry ( †Captain Masagi Hiruma)

Detachment, 29th Field Hospital ( †Captain Hayashi)
Platoon, 164th Independent Vehicle Company
Tank Company, 18th Infantry Regiment ( †Lieutenant Katsuo Shikamura)
1st Battalion, 135th Infantry Regiment ( †Captain Isumi)

== Bibliography ==
- Bosworth, Everett W. (9 September 1944). Final report of XXIV Corps artillery on Forager Operation, phases I and III, 15 June 1944 to 1 August 1944 (Report).
- Crowl, Philip A. (1960). Campaign in the Marianas (PDF). United States Army in World War II, The War in the Pacific. Center of Military History, United States Army. OCLC 1049152860. CMH Pub 5-7. Archived from the original (PDF) on September 27, 2012.
- Hoffman, Carl W. (1951). The Seizure of Tinian (PDF). USMC Historical Monographs. Washington, DC: Historical Division, Headquarters, US Marine Corps.
- Prefer, Nathan N. (2012). The Battle for Tinian: Vital Stepping Stone in America's War Against Japan. Oxford: Casemate Publishers. ISBN 978-1-61200-094-7. OCLC 794490656.
- Rottman, Gordon L. (2002). U.S. Marine Corps World War II Order of Battle - Ground and Air Units in the Pacific War, 1939 - 1945. Greenwood Press. ISBN 0-313-31906-5. OCLC 367956777.
- Shaw, Henry I. Jr.; Nalty, Bernard C.; Turnbladh, Edwin T. (1994) [1966]. Central Pacific Drive. History of U.S. Marine Corps Operations in World War II. Vol. 3. Historical Branch, G–3 Division, Headquarters, US Marine Corps. ISBN 978-0-89839-194-7. OCLC 927428034.
