= Wilburt S. Brown =

United States Marine Corps general

Wilburt Scott Brown
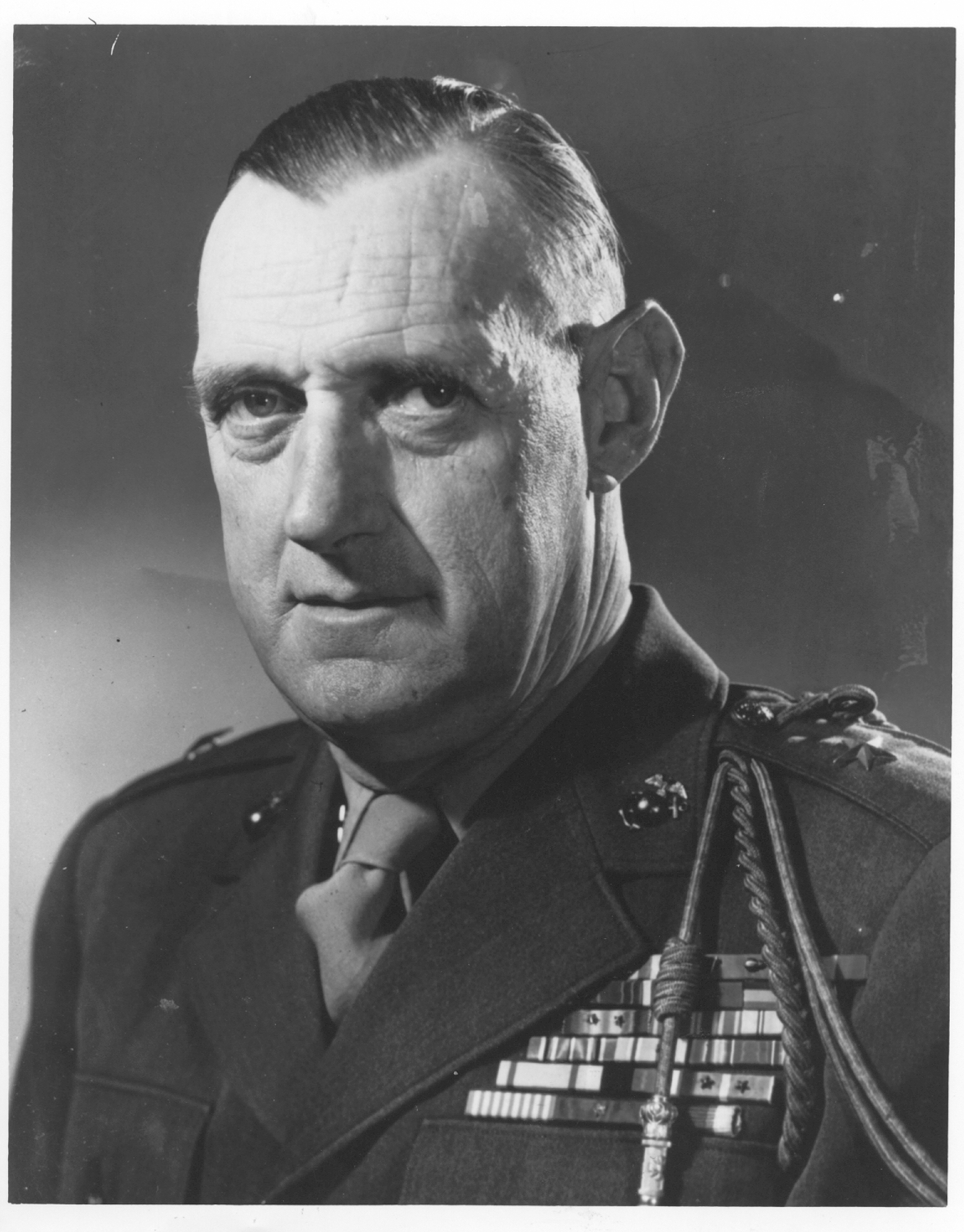
- Major General Wilburt S. Brown, USMC
- Born: 20 December 1900; Beverly, Massachusetts, U.S.
- Died: 17 December 1968 (aged 67); Birmingham, Alabama, U.S.
- Military career
- Allegiance: United States of America
- Branch: United States Marine Corps
- Service years: 1918–1920, 1922–1953
- Rank: Major general
- Nickname: "Big Foot"
- Commands: 4th Battalion, 10th Marines; 15th Marines; 11th Marines; 10th Marines; 1st Marines; Fleet Marine Force, Pacific
- Conflicts: World War I World War II; Korean War
- Awards: Silver Star Medal; Legion of Merit (2) with Combat "V"; Navy and Marine Corps Medal; Purple Heart Medal

Wilburt Scott Brown (20 December 1900 – 17 December 1968) was a United States Marine Corps general who was a combat veteran of World War I, the Nicaraguan campaign, World War II, and the Korean War. He served in the Marine Corps for thirty-five years, from 1918 to 1953.

== Biography ==
Wilburt Scott Brown was born on 20 December 1900, in Beverly, Massachusetts, and attended Holliston High School and Phillips Academy in Andover, Massachusetts.

=== World War I ===
He enlisted in the U.S. Marine Corps on 28 May 1918 and served with the 20th Company, 5th Marines, in France during World War I, for which he holds two battle clasps and the Purple Heart Medal.

On 8 July 1920, Brown was discharged from the Marine Corps to accept an appointment to the U.S. Naval Academy. However, he left the academy in September 1922, and re-enlisted in the Marine Corps. He was commissioned a second lieutenant from the ranks on 19 February 1925.

In July 1925, after serving as a company officer at the Navy Yard, Norfolk, Virginia, he entered the Officers Basic School at the Marine Barracks, Navy Yard, Philadelphia. On completing Basic School, he was ordered to the Marine Barracks, Quantico, Virginia, where he rejoined the 20th Company, 5th Marines, with which he had served in World War I. That company was among those chosen to represent the Marine Corps at the Philadelphia Exposition of 1926, until it was called out to guard the mails during an outbreak of robberies.

With the 5th Marines, Brown sailed for Nicaragua in February 1927. He fought in several engagements against rebel bandits in that country and was awarded the Navy and Marine Corps Medal for an action near Buena Vista on 19 January 1928.

He returned from Nicaragua in May 1929, and was assigned to the Sea School at the Marine Corps Base, San Diego, California. That October, he joined the Marine Detachment aboard the USS Saratoga, serving on that ship until June 1931. He then served at the Marine Barracks, Mare Island Naval Shipyard, California, until May 1933, when he sailed for duty at the Marine Barracks, Guam.

Returning from Guam in July 1935, Brown served for two months as executive officer of the rifle range detachment at Quantico before entering the Base Defense Weapons Course in the Marine Corps Schools there. After graduating, he commanded an artillery battery of the 1st Marine Brigade at Quantico until the Fall of 1936, when he was ordered to the Marine Corps Base, San Diego.

At San Diego, Brown commanded a 155mm battery with the 2nd Marine Brigade until February 1938, when he was ordered to the Marine Barracks, Navy Yard, Mare Island. There, he was Assistant Acting Quartermaster and member of the Naval Retiring Board until June 1939, when he took command of the Marine detachment aboard the USS Pennsylvania (BB-38).

=== World War II ===
In July 1941, he returned to San Diego to become the executive officer and later the commander of the 4th Battalion, 10th Marine Regiment, 2nd Marine Division.

He left San Diego in March 1942 to serve as executive officer of the 8th Defense Battalion in the Pacific theater. Returning to the United States in January 1943, he was assigned to San Diego until he entered an advanced artillery school at Fort Sill, Oklahoma.

After completing the school, he helped organize the Troop Training Unit at the Amphibious Training Base, Coronado and Morro Bay, California, later serving as artillery and naval gunfire instructor with that unit. During this period, four army infantry regiments and two Marine Corps divisions were trained in amphibious warfare at the base, and Brown became one of the pioneers in the coordination of naval gunfire, artillery, and air support. He taught and practiced those tactics throughout his subsequent service.

In October 1944, Brown was again ordered to the Pacific theater, where he organized and briefly commanded the 15th Marine Regiment, 6th Marine Division. He then took command of the 11th Marine Artillery Regiment, 1st Marine Division, serving in that capacity during the Okinawa campaign and in China at the war's end. He was awarded the Legion of Merit with Combat "V" for outstanding service at Okinawa and an Oak Leaf Cluster in lieu of a second Legion of Merit for his service in China.

Returning from China in October 1946, General Brown was assigned to the Air University, Maxwell Field, Alabama, as an instructor in the Naval Division. While teaching amphibious warfare and the coordination of fire and air support there, he completed the Air Command and Staff School. He left Maxwell Field to take command of the 10th Marine Artillery Regiment, 2nd Marine Division, at Camp Lejeune, North Carolina, in June 1949.

=== Korean War ===
Brown embarked for Korea in April 1951, commanding the 1st Marine Regiment, 1st Marine Division from May to July 1951. He was awarded the Silver Star Medal for his service with the 1st Marines. He returned to the United States in December 1951.

In May 1952, after serving briefly as assistant chief of staff, G-2 (Intelligence), of Marine Corps Base Camp Pendleton, Brown was assigned to the staff of the Field Artillery School at Fort Sill. He was promoted to brigadier general in August 1952, and in October 1952, returned to Camp Pendleton to serve as commanding general, Force Troops, Fleet Marine Force, Pacific. He was promoted to major general on retirement after thirty-five years of service, on 1 December 1953.

After his retirement, Brown entered the University of Alabama as a junior and graduated in 1963 with a PhD in history.

Major General Brown died on 17 December 1968 at the VA Hospital in Birmingham, Alabama.

== Military awards ==
Brown's decorations and awards include:

1st Row	Silver Star Medal	Legion of Merit w/ one oak leaf cluster	Navy and Marine Corps Medal	Purple Heart Medal	French Fourragère
2nd Row	Navy Presidential Unit Citation	Navy Unit Commendation	Marine Corps Good Conduct Medal	World War I Victory Medal w/ two clasps	French Fourragère
3rd Row	Nicaraguan Campaign Medal (1933)	China Service Medal	American Defense Service Medal w/ one clasp (3/16" bronze star)	American Campaign Medal	French Fourragère
4th Row	Asiatic–Pacific Campaign Medal w/ one 3/16" bronze star	World War II Victory Medal	Navy Occupation Service Medal	National Defense Service Medal	French Fourragère
5th Row	Korean Service Medal w/ two 3/16" bronze stars	Nicaraguan Medal of Merit	Order of the Cloud and Banner	United Nations Korea Medal	French Fourragère

=== Silver Star citation ===
Citation:

The President of the United States of America takes pleasure in presenting the Silver Star to Colonel Wilburt S. Brown (MCSN: 0-3960), United States Marine Corps, for conspicuous gallantry and intrepidity as Commanding Officer of the First Marines, FIRST Marine Division (Reinforced), in action against enemy aggressor forces in Korea on 2 and 3 June 1951. When one of his assault battalions was subjected to an accurate enemy mortar and artillery barrage which inflicted heavy casualties, including four company commanders and ten other officers, Colonel Brown proceeded to the area in the face of the murderous fire and skillfully reorganized the battalion, enabling it to continue the attack. Moving to an exposed position in full view of the enemy and under continuous hostile mortar and artillery fire, he directed his men in seizing all assigned objectives and in inflicting a serious defeat upon a tenacious enemy. By his inspiring leadership, aggressive fighting spirit and courageous initiative, Colonel Brown upheld the highest traditions of the United States Naval Service.
