= List of battles with most Japanese military fatalities =

This article contains a list of battles and military campaigns with most Japanese military deaths.

== Introduction ==
This article lists battles and campaigns in which the number of Japanese military fatalities exceed 1,000. The term casualty in warfare refers to a soldier who is no longer fit to fight after being in combat. Casualties can include killed, wounded, missing, captured or deserted.

In this article the numbers of killed refer to those killed in action, killed by disease, missing presumed dead, or someone who died from their wounds.

== Battles ==
Battle or siege	Conflict	Date	Estimated number killed	Opposing force	References
Battle of Shanghai	Second Sino-Japanese War	August 13 to November 26, 1937	18,800 killed	China	
Battle of Guam (1944)	World War II	July 21 to August 10, 1944	18,377 killed	United States	
Battle of Noryang	Imjin War	December 16, 1598	18,000 killed (Note: 13,000 killed in action and 500 beheaded)	Joseon; Ming dynasty	
Battle of Mukden	Russo-Japanese War	February 20 to March 10, 1905	16,553 killed	(Russian Empire) Russia	
Battle of Manila (1945)	World War II	February 3 to March 3, 1945	16,000 killed	United States (Commonwealth of the Philippines) Philippines	
Siege of Port Arthur	Russo-Japanese War	August 1, 1904 to January 2, 1905	14,000 killed	(Russian Empire) Russia	
Battle of Peleliu	World War II	September 15 to November 27, 1944	12,033 killed	United States	
Battle of Wuhan	Second Sino-Japanese War	June 11 to October 27, 1938	9,597 killed	China	
Battles of Khalkhin Gol	Soviet–Japanese border conflicts	May 11 to September 16, 1939	9,471 killed (Note: Per a 1942 Japanese monument dedicated to Japanese and Manchu soldiers who died during the battle, which lists the names of 9,471 Japanese and 202 Manchu soldiers.)	Soviet Union; Mongolia	
Battle of Mutanchiang	Soviet–Japanese War	August 12, 1945 to August 16, 1945	9,361 killed	Soviet Union	
Battle for Cebu City	World War II	March 26 to April 8, 1945	9,000 killed (Note: Around 5,550 during the fighting, 2,000 due to suicide, and the remaining 1,450 died due to other causes.)	United States (Commonwealth of the Philippines) Philippines	
Battle of the Sittang Bend	World War II	July 2 to August 7, 1945	8,500 killed	(British Empire) United Kingdom	
Battle of Changsha (1944)	Second Sino-Japanese War	May 26 to August 8, 1944	7,602 killed (Note: Losses until early September 1944)	China	
Battle of Buna–Gona	World War II	November 16, 1942 to January 22, 1943	7,000 killed	Australia; United States	
Battle of Kohima	World War II	April 4 to June 22, 1944	7,000 killed	United Kingdom; Nepal	
Battle of Meiktila and Mandalay	World War II	January to March, 1945	6,513 killed	United Kingdom; United States	
Battle of Villa Verde Trail	World War II	February 21 to May 31, 1945	5,750 killed	United States	
Battle of Tinian	World War II	July 24 to August 1, 1944	5,745 killed	United States	
Battle of Liaoyang	Russo-Japanese War	August 25 to September 3, 1904	5,537 killed	(Russian Empire) Russia	
Battle of Biak	World War II	May 27 to August 17, 1944	4,700 killed	United States; Australia	
Battle of Munda Point	World War II	July 2 to August 5, 1943	4,683 killed	United States	
Battle of Shaho	Russo-Japanese War	October 5 to October 17, 1904	4,099 killed	(Russian Empire) Russia	
Battle of West Hunan	Second Sino-Japanese War	April 6 to June 7, 1945	3,995 killed	China	
Battle of Eniwetok	World War II	February 17 to February 23, 1944	3,380 killed	United States	
Battle of Mount Austen, the Galloping Horse, and the Sea Horse	World War II	December 15, 1942 to January 23, 1943	3,300 killed (Note: Estimates range from 2,700 to 3,300 killed)	United States; Colony of Fiji (Dominion of New Zealand) New Zealand	
Battle of Xuzhou	Second Sino-Japanese War	February 9 to May 21, 1938	3,171 killed (Note: Second Army of the North China Area Army only)	China	
Battle of Bataan	World War II	January 7 to April 9, 1942	3,107 killed	United States (Commonwealth of the Philippines) Philippines	
Battle of Midway	World War II	June 4 to June 7, 1942	3,057 killed	United States	
Battle of Lake Khasan	Soviet–Japanese border conflicts	July 29 to August 11, 1938	3,000 killed (Note: 526 killed per Japanese sources and 3,000 killed or missing/missing presumed dead per Soviet sources)	Soviet Union	
Siege of Myitkyina	World War II	May 17 to August 3, 1944	2,979 killed	China; United States	
Battle of Bessang Pass	World War II	June 1 to June 15, 1945	2,600 killed	United States (Commonwealth of the Philippines) Philippines	
Battle of Attu	World War II	May 11 to 30, 1943 (Note: Japanese holdouts lasted until September 8, 1943)	2,351 killed	United States; Canada	
Battle of Baguio	World War II	February 21 to April 26, 1945	2,000 killed	United States	
Battle of Cape Gloucester	World War II	December 26, 1943 to January 16, 1944	2,000 killed	United States; Australia	
Battle of Nanking	Second Sino-Japanese War	November 11 to December 13, 1937	1,953 killed (Note: Estimates range from 1,558 to 1,953)	China	
Battle of Sandepu	Russo-Japanese War	January 25 to January 29, 1905	1,848 killed	(Russian Empire) Russia	
Siege of Pyongyang (1593)	Imjin War	February 6 to February 8, 1593	1,700 killed	Ming dynasty Joseon	
Battle of Changsha (1941)	Second Sino-Japanese War	September 6 to October 8, 1941	1,684 killed	China	
Battle of Changde	Second Sino-Japanese War	November 2, 1943 to January 5, 1944	1,666 killed	China	(Note: Losses until December 29, 1943)
Battle of Xinkou	Second Sino-Japanese War	October 11 to November 5, 1937	1,651 killed	China	
Battle of Changsha (1941–1942)	Second Sino-Japanese War	December 24, 1941 to January 15, 1942	1,591 killed	China	
Battle of Tulagi and Gavutu–Tanambogo	World War II	August 7 to August 9, 1942	1,500 killed	United States; United Kingdom	
Battle of Sio	World War II	December 5, 1943 to March 1, 1944	1,421 killed	Australia; United States	
Battle of Zaoyang–Yichang	Second Sino-Japanese War	May 1 to June 18, 1940	1,403 killed	China	
Battle of Mount Song	World War II	June 4 to September 7, 1944	1,397 killed	China	
Battle of Angaur	World War II	September 17 to October 22, 1944	1,350 killed	United States	
Battle of North Borneo	World War II	June 10 to August 15, 1945	1,234 killed	Australia; United States	
Battle of Wau	World War II	January 29 to February 4, 1943	1,200 killed	Australia; United States	
Battle of Qingshanli	Korean Revolution	October 21 to 26, 1920	1,200 killed (Note: Estimates range from 11 killed to 1,200 killed)	Provisional Government of the Republic of Korea	
Battle of South Shanxi (1940)	Second Sino-Japanese War	April 17 to June 20, 1940	1,174 killed	China	

== Campaigns ==
Campaign	Conflict	Date	Estimated number killed	Opposing force	References
Philippines campaign (1944–1945)	World War II	October 20, 1944 to August 15, 1945	320,795 killed	United States (Commonwealth of the Philippines) Philippines; Australia; Mexico	
New Guinea campaign	World War II	January 23, 1942 to 15 August, 1945	202,100 killed (Note: 127,600 on New Guinea main island, 44,000 on Bougainville and 30,500 on New Britain, New Ireland, and the Admiralty Islands)	United States; Australia; United Kingdom; Netherlands	
Japan campaign	World War II	April 18, 1942 to September 1, 1945	193,300 killed	United States; United Kingdom; Canada (Dominion of New Zealand) New Zealand; Australia; Soviet Union	
Burma campaign	World War II	December 14, 1941 to September 13, 1945	164,500 killed (Note: Estimates range from 144,000 to 164,500)	United Kingdom (British Raj) India (Myanmar) Burma; Gambia (Gold Coast (British colony)) Gold Coast; Kenya; Nigeria; Northern Rhodesia; Southern Rhodesia; Nyasaland; Uganda; China; United States (Kingdom of Nepal) Nepal	
Operation Ichi-Go	World War II	April 19 to December 31, 1944	100,000 killed	China; United States	
Battle of Okinawa	World War II	April 1 to June 22, 1945	94,136 killed	United States; United Kingdom; Australia (Dominion of New Zealand) New Zealand; Canada	
Battle of Leyte	World War II	October 17 to December 26, 1944	65,000 killed	United States; Australia	
Bougainville campaign	World War II	November 1, 1943 to August 21, 1945	21,500 killed	United States; Australia (Dominion of New Zealand) New Zealand; Fiji	
Soviet invasion of Manchuria	World War II	August 9, 1945 to August 20, 1905	21,389 killed	Soviet Union (Mongolian People's Republic) Mongolia	
Guadalcanal campaign	World War II	August 7, 1942, to February 9, 1943	Over 19,200 killed (Note: 19,200 killed from the Imperial Japanese Army and an unknown amount from the Imperial Japanese Navy)	United States; Australia; United Kingdom (Dominion of New Zealand) New Zealand	
Gilbert and Marshall Islands campaign	World War II	August 1942 to February 1944	18,085 killed (Note: 5,085 on the Gilbert Islands and 11,000 on the Marshall Islands)	United States	
Japanese invasion of Manchuria	Interwar period and Pre-war phase of the Second Sino-Japanese War	September 18, 1931 to February 27, 1932	10,000 killed	China	
1939–1940 Winter Offensive	Second Sino-Japanese War	November 26, 1939 to April 3, 1940	7,406 killed	China	
Huon Peninsula campaign	World War II	September 22, 1943 to March 1, 1944	5,500 killed	United States; Australia	
Malayan campaign	World War II	December 8, 1941 to February 15, 1942	5,240 killed	United Kingdom; Netherlands	
Aleutian Islands campaign	World War II	June 3, 1942 to August 15, 1943	4,350 killed	United States; Canada	
Operation Kikusui I	World War II	April 7, 1945	4,137 killed	United States	
Philippines campaign (1941–1942)	World War II	December 8, 1941 to May 8, 1942	4,130 killed	United States (Commonwealth of the Philippines) Philippines	
Operation Kikusui	World War II	April 6 to June 22, 1945	3,860 killed	United States; United Kingdom	
Bougainville counterattack	World War II	March 8 to March 25, 1944	3,500 killed	United States; Fiji (Dominion of New Zealand) New Zealand	
Admiralty Islands campaign	World War II	February 29 to May 18, 1944	3,280 killed	United States; Australia	
Japanese intervention in Siberia	Russian Civil War	January 12, 1918 to June 24, 1922	3,116 killed (Note: 1,399 killed in action and 1,717 killed by disease)	(Russian Soviet Federative Socialist Republic) Russian SFSR; Far Eastern Republic	
Hundred Regiments Offensive	Second Sino-Japanese War	August 20, 1940 to January 24, 1941	2,349 killed (Note: Including losses of the Japanese Army in North China against Nationalist guerillas from August to December 1940)	China	
Beiping–Hankou Railway Operation	Second Sino-Japanese War	September 14 to December 28, 1937	1,722 killed	China	
Fall of Singapore	World War II	February 8 to February 15, 1942	1,714 killed	United Kingdom; Australia	
New Georgia campaign	World War II	June 30 to October 7, 1943	1,671 killed	United States (Dominion of New Zealand) New Zealand; Australia	
Zhejiang-Jiangxi Campaign	Second Sino-Japanese War	May 15 to September 4, 1942	1,620 killed	China	
Pescadores campaign	First Sino-Japanese War	March 23 to 26, 1895	1,500 killed	(Qing dynasty) China	
Tianjin–Pukou Railway Operation	Second Sino-Japanese War	August 21, 1937 to January 11, 1938	1,149 killed	China	

== Bibliography ==
- Cloe, John Haile (1990). The Aleutian Warriors: A History of the 11th Air Force and Fleet Air Wing 4. Missoula, Montana: Pictorial Histories Publishing Co. and Anchorage Chapter – Air Force Association. ISBN 0-929521-35-8. OCLC 25370916.
- Takekoshi, Yosaburō (1907). Japanese rule in Formosa. London, New York, Bombay and Calcutta: Longmans, Green, and co. OCLC 753129. OL 6986981M.
- Davidson, James W. (1903). The Island of Formosa, Past and Present: history, people, resources, and commercial prospects: tea, camphor, sugar, gold, coal, sulphur, economical plants, and other productions. London and New York: Macmillan. OCLC 1887893. OL 6931635M.
- Lai, Benjamin (2017). Shanghai and Nanjing 1937: Massacre on the Yangtze. Osprey Publishing. ISBN 9781472817495.
- Glantz, David (2004). Soviet Operational and Tactical Combat in Manchuria, 1945: 'August Storm'. Routledge. ISBN 978-1-13-577477-6.
- Swope, Kenneth M. (2009), A Dragon's Head and a Serpent's Tail: Ming China and the First Great East Asian War, 1592–1598, University of Oklahoma Press
- Abe, S. (1994). 特攻大和艦隊 [Special Attack Fleet Yamato] (in Japanese). Shinjuku: Tatsumi Publishing Co. ISBN 978-4-87602-211-3.
- MacArthur, Douglas (1994b). Reports of General MacArthur. Vol. 2. other authors: Staff of his General Headquarters. Washington, D.C.: United States Army Center of Military History. LCCN 95162929. Archived from the original on 25 January 2008.
- Tanaka, Kengoro (1980). Operations of the Imperial Japanese Armed Forces in the Papua New Guinea Theater During World War II. Tokyo: Japan Papua New Guinea Goodwill Society. OCLC 9206229.
- Shaw, Henry I. Jr.; Nalty, Bernard C.; Turnbladh, Edwin T. (1994) [1966]. Central Pacific Drive. History of U.S. Marine Corps Operations in World War II. Vol. 3. Historical Branch, G–3 Division, Headquarters, US Marine Corps. ISBN 978-0-89839-194-7. OCLC 927428034. FMFRP 12-34-III.
- Allen, Louis (2000) [1984]. Burma: The Longest War 1941–45. London: Phoenix Press. ISBN 978-1-84212-260-0.
- Smith, Robert Ross (1993). "Triumph in the Philippines" (PDF). Center of Military History. United States Army. Archived from the original (PDF) on September 27, 2012.
- Tanaka, Kengoro (1980). Operations of the Imperial Japanese Armed Forces in the Papua New Guinea Theater During World War II. Tokyo: Japan Papua New Guinea Goodwill Society. OCLC 9206229.
- Clodfelter, Micheal (2008). Warfare and armed conflicts : a statistical encyclopedia of casualty and other figures, 1494–2007. Jefferson: McFarland. ISBN 9780786433193.
- Parshall, Jonathan; Tully, Anthony (2005). Shattered Sword: The Untold Story of the Battle of Midway. Dulles, Virginia: Potomac Books. ISBN 1-57488-923-0.
- Moran, J.; Rottman, , G.L. (2002). Peleliu 1944. Oxford: Osprey Publishing Ltd. ISBN 1841765120.
- Turner, Richmond K. (25 August 1944). Report of the Capture of the Marianas (PDF). United States Marine Navy. Archived from the original on 12 March 2024.
- Coulthard-Clark, Chris (1998). Where Australians Fought: The Encyclopaedia of Australia's Battles. St Leonards, New South Wales: Allen & Unwin. ISBN 1-86448-611-2.
- Johnston, Mark (2002). That Magnificent 9th: An Illustrated History of the 9th Australian Division 1940–46. Sydney, New South Wales: Allen & Unwin. ISBN 1-86508-654-1.
- Coox, Alvin D. (1985). Nomonhan: Japan Against Russia, 1939. Two volumes. Stanford University Press. ISBN 0-8047-1160-7.
- McCarthy, Dudley (1959). South-West Pacific Area—First Year. Australia in the War of 1939–1945. Canberra: Australian War Memorial. OCLC 6152102.
- Lofgren, Stephen (1996). Southern Philippines. The U.S. Army Campaigns of World War II. Washington, DC: U.S. Army Center of Military History. ISBN 9780160481406.
