= USS La Salle (AP-102) =

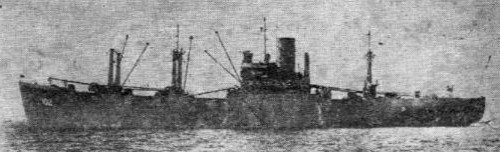

History

United States
- Name: USS La Salle
- Builder: Moore Dry Dock Company, Oakland, California
- Laid down: 29 April 1942
- Launched: 2 August 1942
- Acquired: 18 March 1943
- Commissioned: 31 March 1943, as USS Hotspur
- Decommissioned: 24 July 1946
- Renamed: USS La Salle, 6 April 1943
- Honors and awards: 8 battle stars (World War II)
- Fate: Returned to the Maritime Commission, 25 July 1946; Sold for commercial service, 1948; Wrecked and scrapped, 1968

General characteristics
- Class & type: La Salle-class transport
- Displacement: 5,933 long tons (6,028 t)
- Length: 459 ft 2 in (140 m)
- Beam: 63 ft (19 m)
- Draft: 23 ft (7 m)
- Propulsion: Steam turbine, single shaft, 6,000 hp (4,474 kW)
- Speed: 16.5 knots (30.6 km/h; 19.0 mph)
- Troops: 1,676 men
- Complement: 316 officers and enlisted
- Armament: 1 × 5"/38 caliber gun; 4 × 3"/50 caliber guns; 12 × 20 mm guns

The first USS La Salle (AP-102) of the United States Navy was the lead ship of her class of transport ships in use during the latter part of World War II.

The ship was laid down on 29 April 1942 under Maritime Commission contract as the Type C2 ship SS Hotspur by Moore Dry Dock Company, Oakland, California, launched on 2 August 1942, sponsored by Mrs. Naomi S. Kehoe, acquired by the Navy on 18 March 1943, and commissioned as Hotspur on 31 March 1943.

== Service history ==
Renamed La Salle on 6 April 1943, she left Naval Base Ventura County in Port Hueneme, California on 14 April with Seabees for Guadalcanal, returning to San Francisco on 10 July. On 7 August, she departed from Port Hueneme, California, carrying contingents of United States Navy Argus Units 7,8 and 9, the Ninth Special Construction Battalion and the Fifth Special Medical Unit all bound for operations in the South Pacific. From there she steamed to Wellington, New Zealand, arriving on 27 October. There and in the New Hebrides, she conducted simulated attacks and landing boat exercises with marines in preparation for the assault on Tarawa, for which she sailed on 13 November with Task Force 53. She arrived off the invasion beaches on 19 November, and was shelled by enemy shore batteries early the next morning, suffering no serious damage. She cleared Tarawa the 24th and steamed to San Diego, where she arrived on 13 December to prepare for the invasion of the Marshalls.

La Salle left the west coast on 13 January 1944 and arrived off Kwajalein eight days later to land men of the 4th Marine Division. La Salle left the atoll on 8 February for Pearl Harbor, then later made several reinforcement movements.

From Pearl Harbor she sailed on 11 May with troops for the invasion of the Marianas, arriving on D-Day, 15 June to witness the pre-invasion bombardment before landing her marines. She retired from the battle zone on 23 June and reached Pearl Harbor on 24 July. She then proceeded to Guadalcanal in August where rehearsals for the capture of the Palaus ended on 8 September. She arrived off the Palaus on 15 September and made a feinting attack to keep enemy troops occupied in the northern islands during the attack on Peleliu itself. She landed her troops on the beaches of Angaur the 17th and departed on 23 September for Manus, where she embarked 1,373 troops of the Army 1st Cavalry Division for the Leyte invasion.

La Salle reached the northern transport area off Leyte on 20 October, and all troops and cargo were ashore by nightfall. She retired to the Palaus and then to Guam, where she embarked reinforcements for transport to San Pedro Bay on 23 November. The vessel next loaded 934 troops at Sansapor, New Guinea, and sailed on 30 December for Luzon. On the morning of her departure, she assisted in shooting down an enemy "Jake". She unloaded on 9 January at Lingayen Gulf, and then returned to Leyte.

On 29 January 1945 she arrived off Luzon to discharge 731 troops in order to block Japanese retirement into the Bataan Peninsula. She departed the same day and put into San Pedro Bay on 1 February to prepare for the invasion of Okinawa, off which she arrived from Ulithi on 11 April. She fought off heavy suicide attacks during the next five days, and retired unscathed on 16 April, steaming for Guam and a Seattle overhaul.

Between September 1945 and June 1946, La Salle made four "Magic Carpet" voyages, and one passage in January to deliver occupation troops to Yokosuka. She decommissioned at Seattle on 24 July 1946 and was returned to the Maritime Commission the following day.

La Salle received eight battle stars for World War II service.
