= Clarence L. Burpee =

United States army officer

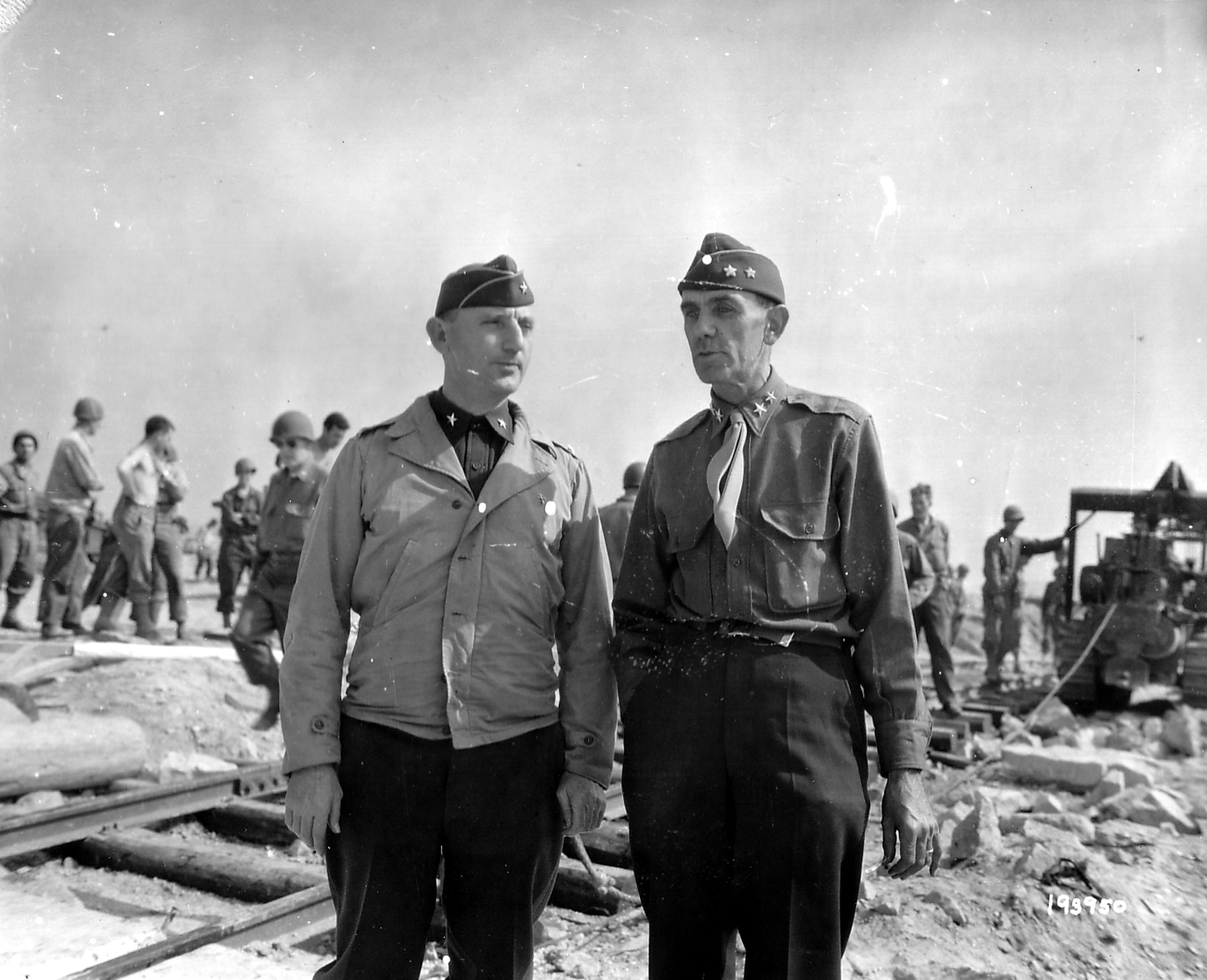
- Burpee (left) with Major General Frank S. Ross, Chief of Transportation, ETOUSA
- Born: 12 September 1894; Jackson, Georgia, US
- Died: 6 October 1956 (aged 62); Jacksonville, Florida, US
- Burial place: Evergreen Cemetery, Jacksonville, Florida, US
- Military career
- Allegiance: United States
- Branch: United States Marine Corps (1918-1919); United States Army (1941–1946)
- Service years: 1918–1919, 1941–1946
- Rank: Brigadier General
- Service number: 0-423085
- Units: United States Marine Corps; United States Army Transportation Corps
- Conflicts: World War I; World War II; North African campaign; Italian campaign; Normandy Campaign; Rhineland Campaign; Central Europe Campaign
- Awards: Army Distinguished Service Medal; Legion of Merit

Clarence Lamar Burpee (12 September 1894 - 6 October 1956) was a United States Army general who commanded the 2nd Military Railway Service during World War II.

After service in the United States Marine Corps during World War I, Burpee was a superintendent of terminals with the Atlantic Coast Line Railroad. During World War II he was commissioned in the United States Army, and commanded the 703rd Railway Grand Division in the North African campaign and the Italian campaign. He then commanded the 2nd Military Railway Service, which supported the campaigns in northwest Europe.

== Early life ==
Clarence Lamar Burpee was born in Jackson, Georgia, on 12 September 1894, the second of the four children of James Arthur Burpee and his wife Katherine Milledge née Smith. His father died when he was just eight years old.

== World War I ==
During World War I, Burpee enlisted in the United States Marine Corps on 4 July 1918. He gave his occupation as "yard master". After basic training at the Marine Corps Recruit Depot Parris Island, he joined the 15th Marine Regiment in August. The following month it sailed to France, but saw no action before the war ended. He was promoted to corporal on 8 January 1919, and returned to the United States in August. He was honorably discharged on 13 August 1919.

Between the two world wars, Burpee served as the superintendent of terminals with the Atlantic Coast Line Railroad in Jacksonville, Florida.

== World War II ==
In July 1941, Burpee was commissioned as a lieutenant colonel in the engineer reserve. He was called to active duty with the rank of colonel in June 1942. He assumed command of the 703rd Railway Grand Division, which landed at Casablanca in North Africa on 18 November, just ten days after the commencement of Operation Torch. The 703rd Railway Grand Division moved on to Italy, where it opened the first railway line from Salerno on 5 October. He became the director of military railways in Italy, in which role he was responsible for all American railway units supporting the Italian campaign.

Burpee returned to the United States in November 1943 to become the general manager of the 2nd Military Railway Service. He was promoted to brigadier general in February 1944. The 2nd Military Railway Service arrived in the UK in March 1944, and Burpee landed on Utah Beach in late June. He moved his headquarters to Paris in September 1944, and Brussels in February 1945. By the end of the year, the 2nd Military Railway Service had eighteen railway operating battalion, four shop battalions, five mobile workshop units, and ten hospital train maintenance crews. These were controlled by five railway grand divisions, and had a total of 17,526 men.

He left active duty after the war ended, but was promoted to the substantive rank of brigadier general in May 1947. For his services he was awarded the Army Distinguished Service Medal and the Legion of Merit.

== Death and legacy ==
Burpee, who never married, died in Jacksonville on 6 October 1956, and was buried in Evergreen Cemetery there. The Clarence L. Burpee United States Army Reserve Center in Jacksonville was named in his honor in 1957.
