= History of U.S. Marine Corps Operations in World War II =

Official WW II history series

History of U.S. Marine Corps Operations in World War II is the official history of the United States Marine Corps and its combat operations during World War II. Its five volumes were published beginning in 1958.

== Overview ==
In the Preface to Volume I, Maj. Gen. E.W. Snedeker, the Marine Corps Assistant Chief of Staff, wrote, "By publishing this operational history in a durable form, it is hoped to make the Marine Corps record permanently available for the study of military personnel, the edification of the general public, and the contemplation of serious scholars of military history." Much of the content of the series was derived from 15 historical monographs describing individual campaigns which were prepared soon after the end of World War II. Some of the monographs were expanded by their original authors for inclusion in the current works, while other authors expanded the rest and wrote original material. Japanese sources which had not been available earlier were consulted.

In addition to the main text, each volume includes photographs, appendices, and maps. The appendices contain a chronology, orders of battle, statistics, and guides to military map symbols and abbreviations. Small maps are included within the text and larger ones fold out from inside the back cover.

== Synopses ==
- Volume I: Pearl Harbor to Guadalcanal (1958) by Lt. Col. Frank O. Hough, USMCR; Maj. Verle E. Ludwig, USMC; and Henry I. Shaw, Jr.

"This book covers Marine Corps participation through the first precarious years of World War II, when disaster piled on disaster and there seemed no way to check Japanese aggression." It begins with an overview of the Corps' development of its amphibious warfare doctrine and landing craft, the Corps' expansion beginning in 1940, and the replacement of British forces in Iceland in July 1941. Further sections describe Marine Corps actions during the Pearl Harbor attack, the defense of Wake Island, the loss of the Philippines, the battle of Midway, and the struggle for Guadalcanal.

- Volume II: Isolation of Rabaul (1963) by Henry I. Shaw, Jr. and Maj. Douglas T. Kane, USMC

This volume describes the series of campaigns during which the Allied forces moved north and west along the Solomon Islands chain from Guadalcanal to Bougainville Island and leapt west to New Britain island in the Bismarck Archipelago. An earlier intention to recapture Rabaul was replaced by a plan to reduce that Japanese base solely by air action, and the last section of this volume describes the Marines' contribution to that isolation.

- Volume III: Central Pacific Drive (1966) by Henry I. Shaw, Jr., Bernard C. Nalty, and Edwin T. Turnbladh

This volume opens with a review of early plans for a war against Japan and how they evolved into the strategy eventually followed in the "island hopping" central Pacific Ocean campaigns. It continues with the battles to secure Tarawa in the Gilbert Islands; the islands of Roi-Namur, Kwajalein, Engebi, and Eniwetok in the Marshalls; and Saipan, Tinian, and Guam in the Mariana Islands.

- Volume IV: Western Pacific Operations (1971) by George W. Garand and Truman R. Strobridge

Volume IV opens with the development of the Fleet Marine Force, Pacific, which began in the 1920s, and describes the gradual inclusion of aviation in the Corps' structure. It continues with sections describing the bitter fight for Peleliu, the Marines' contribution to the primarily Army campaign to recapture the Philippines, and the iconic battle for Iwo Jima. A separate section describes Marine aviation during the campaigns for the Marianas, Carolines, and Iwo Jima.

- Volume V: Victory and Occupation (1968) by Benis M. Frank and Henry I. Shaw, Jr.

Half of this volume is devoted to the final campaign of World War II, the invasion and capture of Okinawa. Most of the balance describes plans for the invasion of Japan, the occupation of Japan after its surrender, and the little-known, and futile, efforts to mediate between the Kuomintang and Mao Zedong's Communist forces. It concludes with a retrospective on amphibious warfare and a summary chapter called "A Final Accounting".

== Publication history ==
Volumes I, II, III, and V were published by the Historical Branch, G-3 Division, Headquarters, U.S. Marine Corps. Volume IV was published by the Historical Division, Headquarters, U.S. Marine Corps. They were printed and offered for sale by the Government Printing Office. All five are available as PDFs: , , , , and .
