= 4th Battalion, 10th Marines =

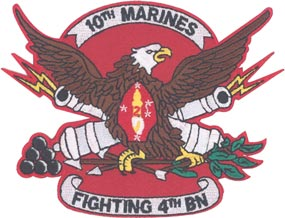
- Insignia patch
- Country: United States of America
- Branch: United States Marine Corps
- Type: Artillery
- Size: Battalion
- Part of: 10th Marine Regiment, 2nd Marine Division
- Nickname: Fighting 4th
- Equipment: 155mm howitzers
- Engagements: World War II: Battle of Tarawa; Battle of Saipan

Commanders
- Major: Ralph E. Forsyth

4th Battalion 10th Marines (4/10) was an artillery battalion in the United States Marine Corps that was formed on 11 April 1941 just prior to America's entrance into World War II and served until the end of the 1980s. It fought at the Battle of Tarawa and the Battle of Saipan during World War II and was sent to Cuba during the Cuban Missile Crisis in case hostilities broke out. The battalion was deactivated for the last time in 1989 and remains in an inactive status today.

== Current units ==
- Headquarters Battery
- K Battery
- L Battery
- M Battery

== History ==
4th Battalion 10th Marines was activated on March 11, 1941, at Marine Corps Base Camp Elliot in San Diego, California. In March 1942 they deployed to Niland, California for six weeks of intensive artillery training at the Marine Corps school that had been established at Marine Corps Barracks Camp Dunlap. They would return to San Diego and eventually deploy on November 3, 1942, on board the SS President Monroe which had just been acquired by the War Shipping Administration to transport troops and supplies overseas. They arrived in Wellington, New Zealand on November 22 and were quickly moved to Camp Judgeford. They would remain there while the rest of the regiment would fight during the Guadalcanal Campaign.

The first combat the battalion would see would come at the Battle of Tarawa although it would not be much. 4/10 landed on November 23, 1943, the last day of the battle, in time to support 2nd Battalion 6th Marines final assault on the islands that made up the eastern portion of the Tarawa Atoll.

4/10 returned to Hawaii along with the rest of the 2nd Marine Division after the battle to rest and refit. They would be based out of Camp Tarawa on the northern edge of the big island of Hawaii. They would remain there and train until May 25, 1944, when the 2nd Marine Division left Pearl Harbor embarked upon 22 LSTs.

== Medal of Honor recipients ==
The Medal of Honor is the highest military decoration awarded by the United States. It is bestowed on a member of the United States armed forces who distinguishes himself or herself "... conspicuously by gallantry and intrepidity at the risk of his life above and beyond the call of duty while engaged in an action against an enemy of the United States ...". The following table contains the name of the man who received the Medal of Honor while serving in 4/10. He is listed in accordance to the "Date of Action" in which the MoH citation was made.

Image	Name	Rank	Place	Date of action	Ref.
	Harold C. Agerholm	Private First Class	Saipan, Marianas Islands	July 7, 1944	

== See also ==
- List of United States Marine Corps battalions
- Organization of the United States Marine Corps
