= United States Navy Argus Units =

The United States Navy created the Argus Training program during the first stages of World War II in the Pacific. The Argus program was strategically designed to train and deploy elite amphibious combat teams able to land in potentially hostile territory and rapidly deploy radar and radio communications equipment, thus paving the way for the beginnings of effective land based fighter aircraft direction. This coordinated fighter direction allowed for interception and prevention of enemy air and surface attacks on allied Pacific bases. The name Argus, referring to a mythological Greek being with 100 eyes, was chosen to symbolize the 'all-seeing' radar of the Argus Units.

== History ==
In October 1942, five officers arrived at the Advance Base Depot, Port Hueneme, California with orders to assist in setting up the Argus Training program and to serve overseas in the first Argus Unit. By January 1943, the Argus training program was shaping up and included classes covering radar plots on polar coordinate charts, operation of radios, the study of 588, 270 and ASE radars as well as other functions all of which were either at Warehouse "I" or at outposts. The first commanding officer, Lt.Comdr. Ralph A. Jack A-V(RS) and other administrative officers were stationed at Port Hueneme.

On April 23, 1943, Argus Unit 1, consisting of 20 officers and 94 enlisted, shipped out of Port Hueneme for combat duty in the South Pacific. Lt.Comdr. Jack accompanied the unit as commanding officer. Lt.Comdr. Andrew Cowan took his place as commanding officer of the Argus Assembly and Training Detachment.

== Training ==
On December 12, 1943, Commander Arthur H. Cummings succeeded Lt.Comdr. Cowan as Commanding Officer as the Argus Training detachment moved to spacious new quarters near Point Mugu. The former schedule of producing four Argus Units per month (which inevitably resulted in inadequate training) was reduced to one unit per month, and a new training syllabus was worked out assuring units were far more competent the earlier ones. Improved radar, radio and other gear were obtained for the units by CNO (Op-30-E) under the sponsorship of Commander M.J. West and the future for Argus operations assumed a broader role than ever before.

Under the new syllabus, training of enlarged units (21 officers and 220 men) went through three stages:

- Primary - six weeks at Port Hueneme during which all personnel received exhaustive basic instruction in Argus functions such as plotting, scope reading, radio telephone procedure, Combat Information Center procedure, and so forth. Each unit was charged with setting up its own gear at an outpost exactly as if at an air strip on a Pacific atoll and conducted interception drills with planes flown from Naval Air Station San Pedro.
- Secondary - units relocated to San Clemente island via LST (Tank Landing Ship). Each unit set up its gear and went through a syllabus containing all types of interception problems, including detecting 'snoopers', controlling searchlight and anti-aircraft batteries, alerting the island of 'enemy' raids, 'homing' lost planes, directing crash boats to pilots downed at sea, maintaining up-to-the-minute intelligence in the CIC of all air and surface activity in the area.
- Final Stage - units worked directly with fighter squadrons with emphasis on directing combat air patrols, estimating altitude of 'bogey' aircraft, and running 'night' interceptions, the most difficult of all, in which the intercept officer directs friendly aircraft using the PPI scope of the 527 radar, attempting to bring his fighter aircraft to within combat distance of the 'bogey' aircraft entirely by remote, radar control.

== Deployment ==
At the completion of the training syllabus the units were ready for combat duty overseas, being a close-knit combat unit, skilled in all Argus functions, self-sufficient and with high morale. These three stages of training simulate the stages in the conquest of a Pacific island - assault, development and occupation.

=== Assault ===
As assaults opened against occupied islands, a task force consisting of carriers, battleships or cruisers and destroyers would strike first, firing on enemy defenses and attacking with available carrier-borne aircraft. Ships bearing a United States Marines amphibious strike force would send strike force troops ashore by landing craft. Fighter Director Officers aboard destroyers close at sea were tasked with directing allied aircraft to intercept and repel any enemy air forces that may have been alerted to the invading strike force. Once a foothold had been established on the island, a selected section of the Argus Unit, known as the first echelon, would deploy ashore carrying radios, portable radars and the basics of necessary equipment. These first elements of the Argus Units would take over parts of the fighter direction role from the destroyers at sea and become the chief component in detecting and warning of approaching enemy air and surface attacks. As the invading force's position gained strength and became secure against counter-offensive attacks from any enemy forces still present, the assault stage transitioned to the development stage.

=== Development ===
In the island development stage, a Navy ACORN unit, composed of a Naval Construction Battalion (Seabees) and other components, construct an airfield. Simultaneously, the remainder of the Argus Unit arrived in waves, setting up the long range 270 radars, the fighter direction 527 radar and surface search radars (such as SO-7M). These remaining Argus personnel are also responsible for erecting the Combat Information Center, the radio tent and telephone lines and for establishing a liaison with Air Command, anti-aircraft batteries, searchlight batteries, PT Boat squadrons, crash boats and other relevant commands. Fighter direction and air warning roles were supplied for the base by the Argus Unit while continuous contact was maintained with other Argus Units and surface forces in the immediate area.

=== Occupation ===
As the island transitioned to an occupation stage, the Army Air Corps assumed control of the airfield and set up permanent airfield and air warning facilities. The Argus Unit returned to a staging point for rest and replacements.
