= MWHS =

MWHS may refer to:

- Marine Wing Headquarters Squadron, squadrons of the United States Marine Corps; specifically:
  - Marine Wing Headquarters Squadron 1
  - Marine Wing Headquarters Squadron 2
  - Marine Wing Headquarters Squadron 3

== Schools ==
- Magnolia West High School, Magnolia, Texas, United States
- Maine West High School, Des Plaines, Illinois, United States
- Millard West High School, Omaha, Nebraska, United States
- Millwood High School, Lower Sackville, Nova Scotia, Canada
- Monroe-Woodbury High School, Central Valley, New York, United States
- Mound Westonka High School, Mound, Minnesota, United States
- Mt. Whitney High School, Visalia, California, United States
- Mineral Wells High School, Mineral Wells, Texas, United States
