= United States Marine Corps Aviation =

Air branch of the U.S. Marine Corps

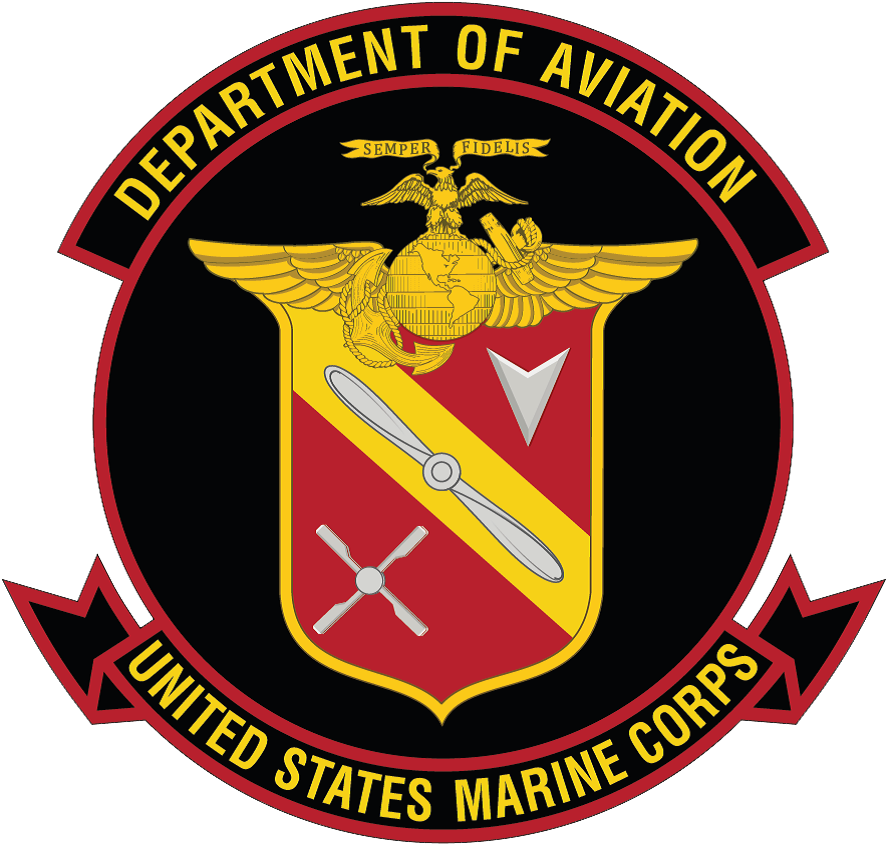
- United States Marine Corps Aviation emblem
- Active: 22 May 1912 - Present
- Country: United States
- Branch: United States Marine Corps
- Type: Naval aviation
- Part of: Headquarters Marine Corps

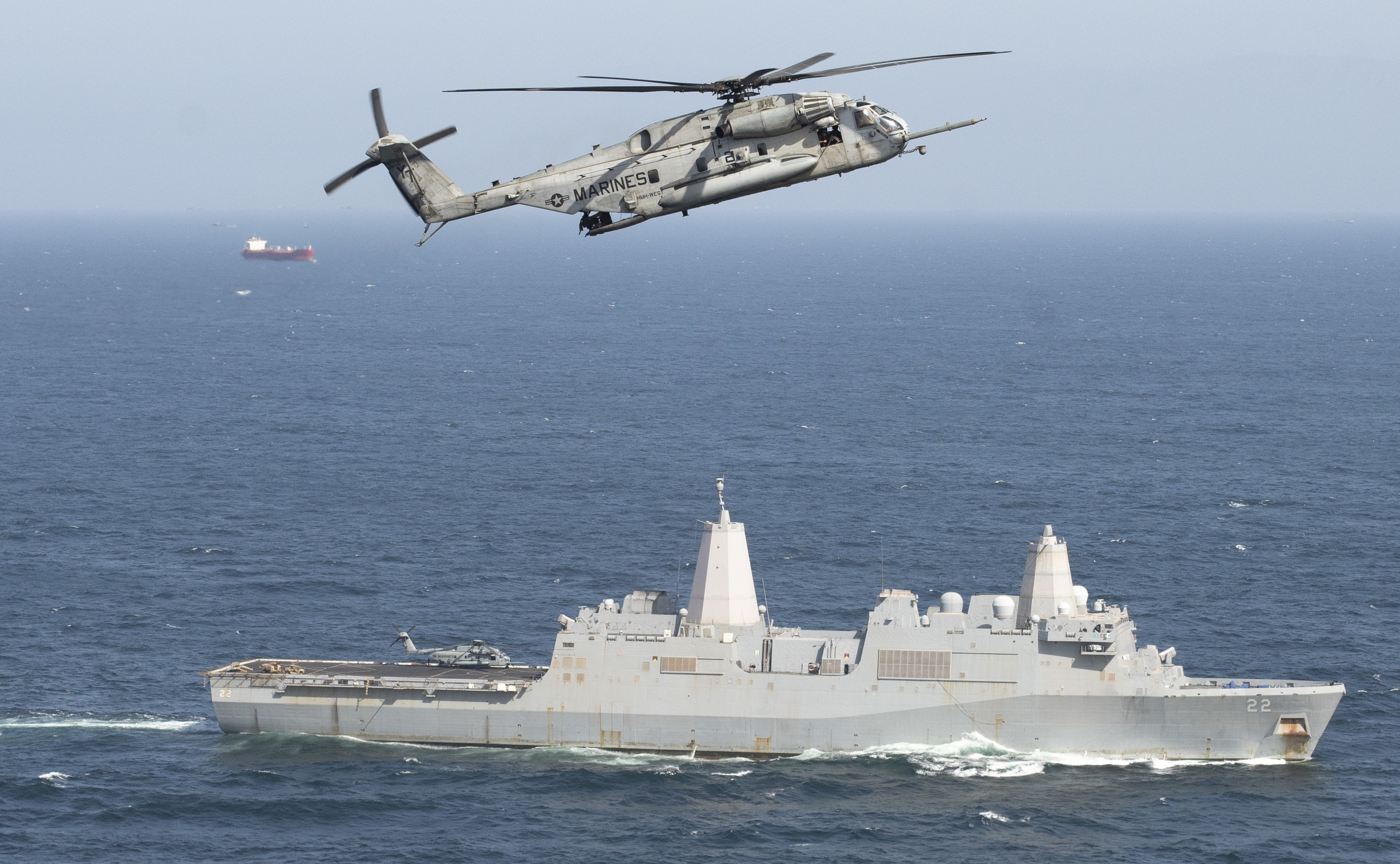
A Marine Corps CH-53E Super Stallion flies above the USS San Diego (LPD-22) over the Persian Gulf in 2021

The United States Marine Corps Aviation (USMCA) is the aircraft arm of the United States Marine Corps. Aviation units within the Marine Corps are assigned to support the Marine Air-Ground Task Force, as the aviation combat element, by providing six functions: assault support, antiair warfare, close air support, electronic warfare, control of aircraft and missiles, and aerial reconnaissance. The Corps operates rotary-wing, tiltrotor, and fixed-wing aircraft mainly to provide transport and close air support to its ground forces. Other aircraft types are also used in a variety of support and special-purpose roles. All Marine Corps aviation falls under the influence of the Deputy Commandant for Aviation, whose job is to advise the commandant of the Marine Corps in all matters relating to aviation, especially acquisition of new assets, conversions of current aircraft, maintenance, operation, and command.

== History ==
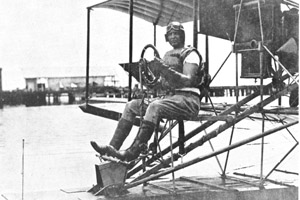
First Lieutenant Alfred A. Cunningham, first Marine Corps aviator

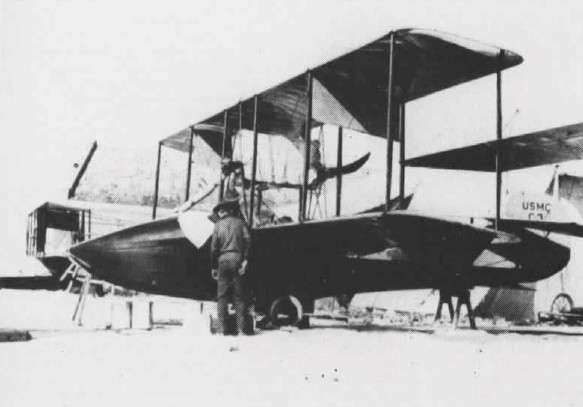
The first USMC plane: a Curtiss C-3

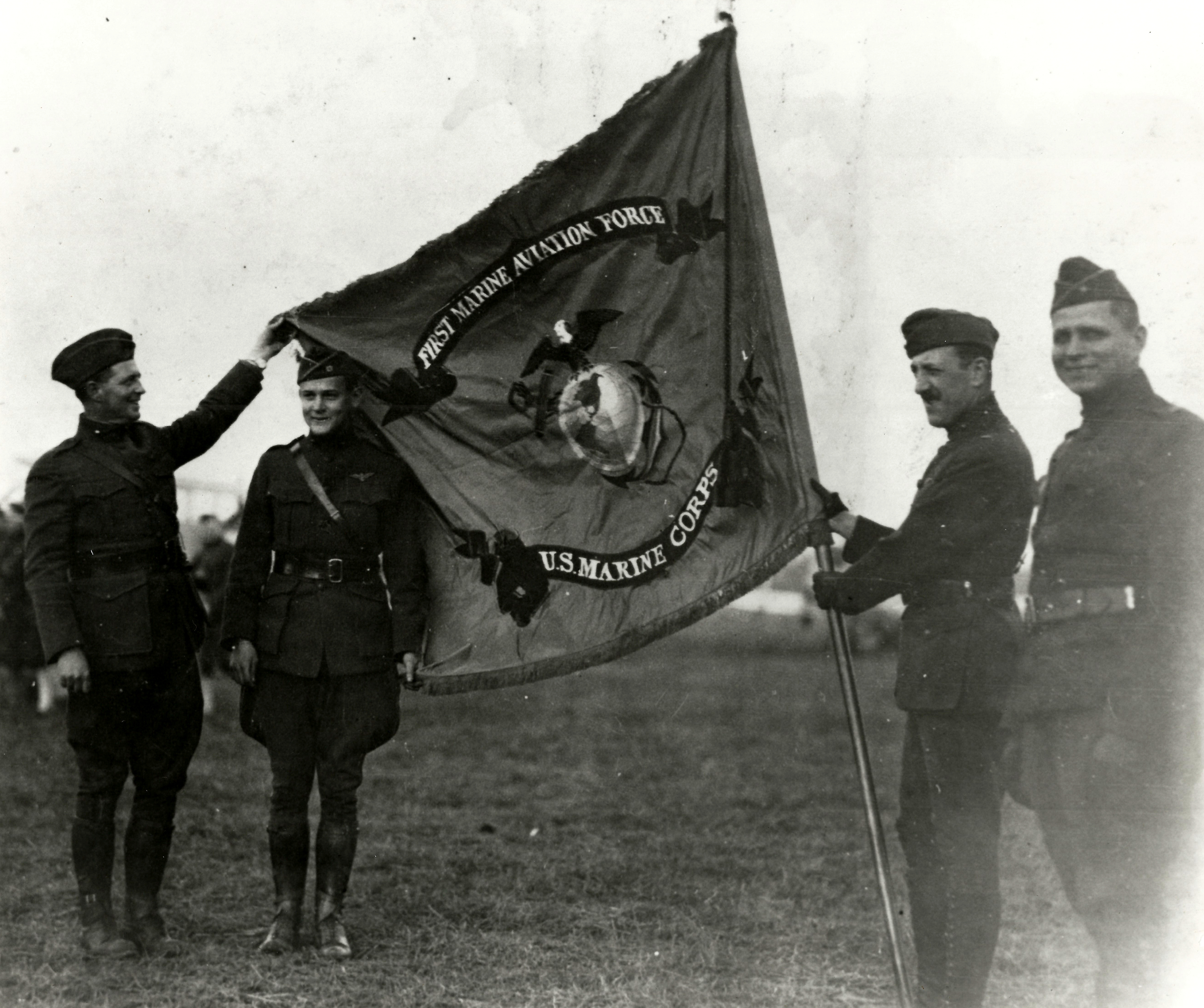
First Marine Aviation Force Colors, 1918 William McIlvain (Naval Aviator No. 12 and Marine Aviator No. 3) second from right. Roy Geiger (Naval Aviator # 49 and Marine Corps Aviator # 5) on far right.

Marine Corps Aviation officially began on 22 May 1912, when First Lieutenant Alfred Austell Cunningham reported to Naval Aviation Camp in Annapolis, Maryland, "for duty in connection with aviation". On 20 August 1912, he became the first Marine aviator when he took off in a Burgess Model H given to him by the Burgess Company in Marblehead Harbor, Massachusetts.

As the number of Marine Corps pilots grew, so did the desire to separate from Naval Aviation, an objective realized on 6 January 1914, when First Lieutenant Bernard L. Smith was directed to Culebra, Puerto Rico, to establish the Marine Section of the Navy Flying School. In 1915, the Commandant of the Marine Corps authorized the creation of a Marine Corps aviation company consisting of 10 officers and 40 enlisted men. The Marine Aviation Company was commissioned on 17 February 1917 as the first official Marine flying unit, at the Philadelphia Navy Yard.

=== World War I ===
Roundel used by the Marine Corps during World War I

VMA-231 Emblem

The first major expansion of the Marine Corps' air component came with America's entrance into World War I in 1917. Wartime expansion saw the Aviation Company split into the 1st Marine Aeronautic Company which deployed to the Azores to hunt U-boats in January 1918 and the First Marine Air Squadron which was deployed to France as the newly renamed 1st Marine Aviation Force in July 1918 and provided bomber and fighter support to the Navy's Day Wing, Northern Bombing Group. By the end of the war, several Marine Aviators had recorded air-to-air kills, and collectively they had dropped over fourteen tons of bombs. Their numbers included 282 officers and 2,180 enlisted men operating from 8 squadrons, with Second Lieutenant Ralph Talbot being the first Marine Corps aviator to earn the Medal of Honor, for action against the Luftstreitkräfte air arm of Imperial Germany on 8 October 1918. In 1919, the 1st Division/Squadron 1 was formed from these units and still exists today as VMA-231.

=== Interwar period ===
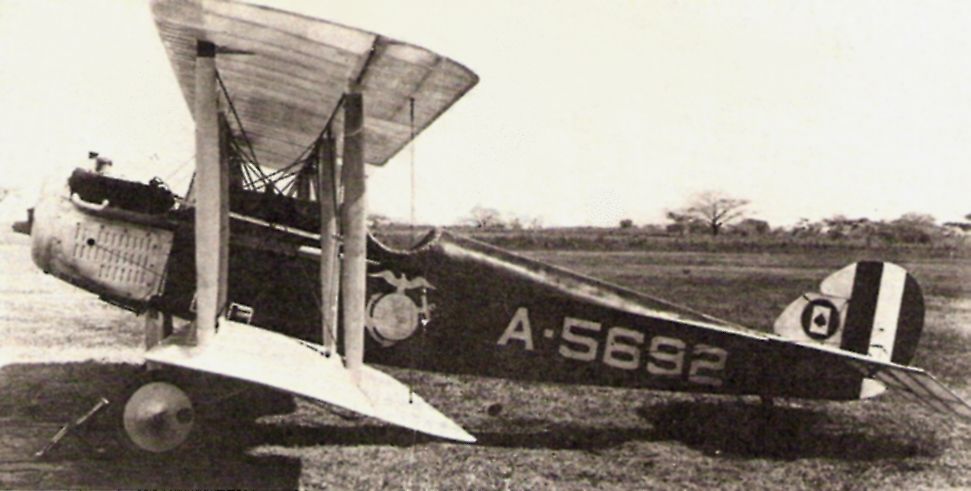
A Vought VE-7F from VO-1M in Santo Domingo, Dominican Republic circa 1922

The end of World War I saw Congress authorize 1,020 men for Marine Corps Aviation and the establishment of permanent air stations at Quantico, Parris Island and San Diego. The United States embraced its role of global power, and the Marine Corps became the preferred force for military intervention; where the Marines went, so went Marine Corps Aviation. During the Banana Wars, while fighting bandits and insurgents in places like Haiti, the Dominican Republic and Nicaragua, Marine Corps aviators began to experiment with air-ground tactics and making the support of their fellow Marines on the ground their primary mission. It was in Haiti that Marines began to develop the tactic of dive bombing and in Nicaragua where they began to perfect it. While other nations and services had tried variations of this technique, Marine Corps pilots were the first to embrace it and make it part of their tactical doctrine. Marine Corps aviation in Nicaragua developed the skill of air resupply of outposts dropping bundles from Fokker F.VII tri-motors. Even prior to the events in the Caribbean, pioneering Marine Corps aviators such as Alfred Cunningham had noted in 1920 that, "...the only excuse for aviation in any service is its usefulness in assisting the troops on the ground to successfully carry out their missions. "

It was not until 3 May 1925 that the Marine Corps officially appeared in the Navy's Aeronautical Organization when Rear Admiral William A. Moffett, Chief of the Navy's Bureau of Aeronautics, issued a directive officially authorizing three fighting squadrons. In the 1920s, Marine Corps squadrons began qualifying on board aircraft carriers. However, in terms of mission and training, the assignment of two Marine scouting squadrons as component units of the Pacific Fleet carriers would be one of the greatest advancements for Marine Corps Aviation. Prior to this, Marine Corps squadrons were loosely controlled with regard to doctrine and training. This assignment enabled nearly 60% of active duty aviators at the time to be exposed to a disciplined training syllabus under a clearly defined mission.

WWII Recruiting poster illustrated by Maj. W. Victor Guinness, USMC

The turning point for the long-term survival of Marine Air came with the structural change of the establishment of the Fleet Marine Force in 1933. This shifted Marine doctrine to focus less on expeditionary duty and more on supporting amphibious warfare by seizing advance naval bases in the event of war. This also saw the establishment of Aircraft One and Aircraft Two to replace the old Aircraft Squadron, East Coast and Aircraft Squadron, West Coast that had supported operations in the Caribbean and China as part of their expeditionary duties. This organization would remain until June 1940 when Congress authorized the Marine Corps 1,167 aircraft as part of its 10,000 plane program for the Navy. Just prior, in 1939, the Navy's General Board published a new mission for Marine Aviation, which stated: "Marine Aviation is to be equipped, organized and trained primarily for the support of the Fleet Marine Force in landing operations and in support of troop activities in the field; and secondarily as replacement for carrier based naval aircraft. " On 7 December 1941, the day of the attack on Pearl Harbor, Marine Corps air units consisted of 13 flying squadrons and 230 aircraft.

=== World War II ===
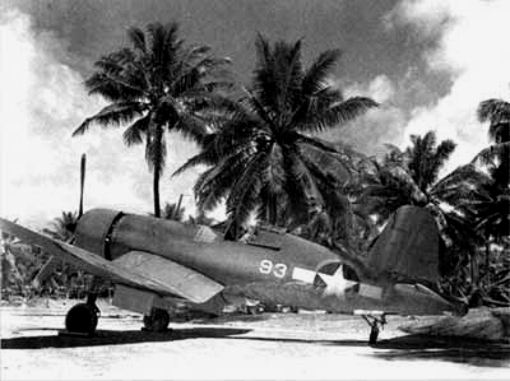
An F4U Corsair of VMF-214 in World War II

During World War II, the Marine Corps' air arm expanded rapidly and extensively. They reached their peak number of units with 5 air wings, 31 aircraft groups and 145 flying squadrons. During the war, and for the next fifty years, the Guadalcanal campaign would become a defining point for Marine Aviation. The great takeaways were the debilitating effects of not having air superiority, the vulnerability of targets such as transport shipping, and the vital importance of quickly acquiring expeditionary airfields during amphibious operations. Because of the way the Pacific War unfolded, Marine Aviation was not able to achieve its 1939 mission of supporting the Fleet Marine Force at first. For the first two years of the war, the air arm spent most of its time protecting the fleet and land-based installations from attacks by enemy ships and aircraft.

This began to change after the Battle of Tarawa as the air support for ground troops flown by Navy pilots left much to be desired. After the battle, General Holland Smith recommended, "Marine aviators, thoroughly schooled in the principles of direct air support," should do the job. The New Georgia campaign saw the first real close air support provided to Marine ground forces by Marine Air; the Bougainville campaign and the campaign to retake the Philippines saw the establishment of air liaison parties to coordinate air support with the Marines fighting on the ground and the Battle of Okinawa brought most of it together with the establishment of aviation command and control in the form of Landing Force Air Support Control Units

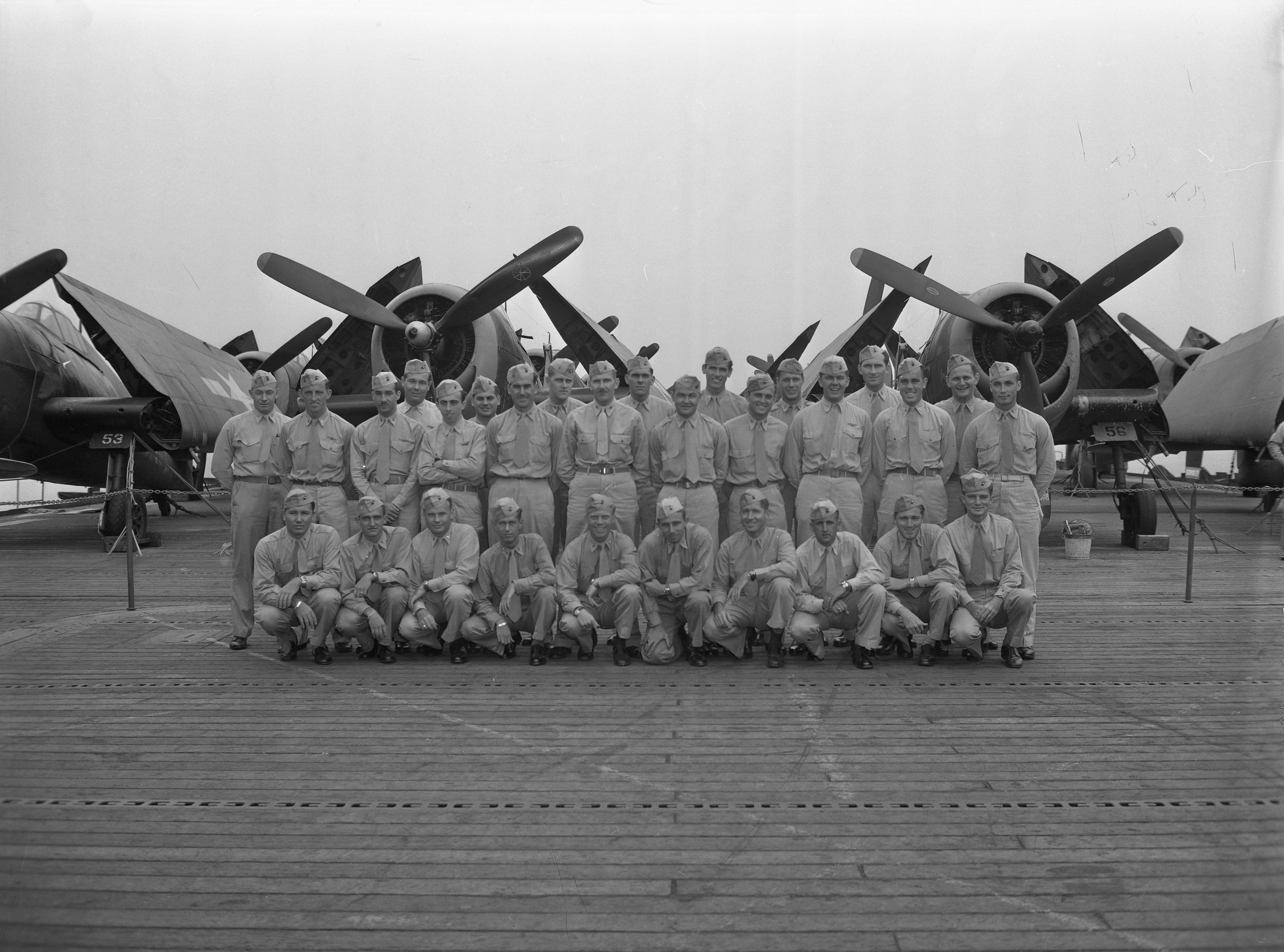
VMA-123 pilots on an aircraft carrier flight deck in July 1945

During the course of the war, Marine Aviators were credited with shooting down 2,355 Japanese aircraft while losing 573 of their own aircraft in combat, they had 120 aces and earned 11 Medals of Honor. Immediately following the war, the strength of the Marine Corps flying arm was drastically cut as part of the post war drawdown of forces. Their active strength fell from 116,628 personnel and 103 squadrons on 31 August 1945 to 14,163 personnel and 21 squadrons on 30 June 1948. They maintained another 30 squadrons in the Marine Air Reserve. Secretary of Defense Louis A. Johnson attempted to eliminate Marine Corps aviation by transferring its air assets to other services and even proposed to progressively eliminate the Marine Corps altogether in a series of budget cutbacks and decommissioning of forces.

=== Jets and helicopters ===
After World War II, most propeller aircraft were gradually phased out as jet aircraft improved and helicopters were developed for use in amphibious operations. The first Marine jet squadron came in November 1947 when VMF-122 fielded the FH Phantom. In December 1950, VMF-311 became the first Marine jet squadron used in combat, providing close air support for the Marines and soldiers on the ground, flying the F9F Panther. In February 1957, VMA-214 became the first Marine squadron to be certified for "special weapons delivery": dropping nuclear weapons. Several others would receive certification, though eventually all nuclear weapons were turned over to Navy and Air Force responsibility.

HMX-1, the first Marine helicopter squadron, was commissioned on 1 December 1947. Marine helicopters—VMO-6 flying the HO3S1 helicopter—made their combat debut in August 1950 during the Battle of the Pusan Perimeter. January 1951 saw the activation of HMR-161, the world's first helicopter transport squadron.

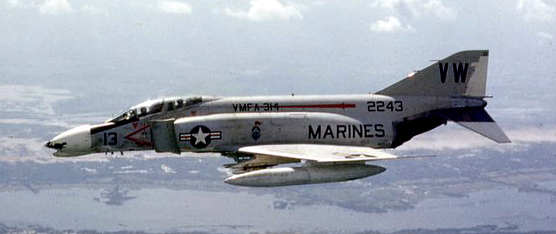
F-4 Phantom II from VMFA-314 returning to Chu Lai during the Vietnam War

The Korean and Vietnam wars saw the size of Marine Aviation rebound from its post-WWII lows, emerging as the force that exists today, consisting of four air wings, 20 aircraft groups and 78 flying squadrons. By the end of the Vietnam War, the Marine Air-Ground Task Force had grown dependent on its multi-mission inventory of fixed- and rotary-wing aircraft, which could operate from land or sea bases to support Marines on the ground. Marine Aviators deployed to the Middle East for Operations Desert Shield and Desert Storm, then to Operation Enduring Freedom in Afghanistan and Operation Iraqi Freedom. 2006 saw Marine Aviation at its highest operational level since the Vietnam War, flying more than 120,000 combat hours in support of operations in and near Afghanistan and Iraq. Despite their aging aircraft and high operating tempo, Marine Aviation maintained a 74.5-percent mission-capable rate.

=== Aircraft upgrades ===
Since the Corps as a whole began to grow in 2007, Marine Aviation expanded with it and continues to grow. Several new squadrons have been activated, including VMFAT-501, and VMU-4. Some support units will gain personnel and equipment. The Corps intends to procure 420 F-35B/Cs (353 F-35Bs and 67 F-35Cs) to replace all F/A-18 Hornets, AV-8B Harrier IIs and EA-6B Prowlers in the fighter, attack, and electronic warfare roles. The MV-22B Osprey replaced the CH-46 Sea Knight and CH-53D Sea Stallion. The Corps has transitioned all East Coast CH-46 squadrons to the MV-22, which has made its first combat deployments and Marine expeditionary unit deployments. The CH-53E Super Stallion will be replaced by the CH-53K King Stallion. The KC-130J Super Hercules will replace all other C-130 models. As part of the H-1 upgrade program, UH-1N Twin Hueys were replaced by UH-1Y Venoms, while AH-1W SuperCobras were upgraded to AH-1Z Vipers. The VH-3D Sea Kings and the VH-60N Blackhawks of HMX-1 are to be replaced by the Sikorsky VH-92 in the VXX program. Unmanned aerial vehicle programs will be upgraded in tiers, with the RQ-7 Shadow replacing the RQ-2 Pioneer and the RQ-11 Raven. They have also been in the lead in looking at unmanned helicopters to resupply troops at remote forward operating bases in places such as Afghanistan.

== Organization ==
=== Branches ===
The Executive Secretariat ensures integration and increased collaboration with fellow HQMC Deputy Commandants and Staff Agencies.

- The Aircrew Program Section (ACP) administers aircrew performance and suitability boards and oversees Marine aircrews assigned to inter-service and international exchange programs.
- The Air Support and Coordination Office (ASCO) oversees approval of Marine aircrew waivers and is the subject matter expert on Operational Support Aircraft tasking and flight approvals.
- The Aviation Administration Section (AA) provides efficient and timely administrative support to the DC Aviation front office and department branches and manages department Internet Technology (IT) systems and programs.

The Cunningham Group forms the nucleus of Marine Aviation. Threat informed, the Cunningham Group is responsible for synthesizing existing capabilities with emerging operational concepts and technologies in order to develop a coherent vision of Marine Corps Aviation that delivers relevant, reliable, survivable, and affordable combat power to the Fleet Marine Force commanders. It will do so through close integration with DC CD&I, Service and joint force partners, industry, universities, and research agencies. The output of the Cunningham Group supports future force design initiatives, the AVPLAN, and resourcing decisions.

The Aviation Expeditionary Enablers (AXE) provides the critical enablers that will allow Marine aviation to thrive at sea and in forward, isolated, austere locations while fully integrating into the Naval Expeditionary and Joint Networks. AXE enablers will ensure the MAGTF can perform the six functions of Marine Aviation within the competition continuum against a peer adversary.

The Aviation Sustainment Branch (ASB) sustains and enhances MAGTF Warfighting capabilities. ASB integrates aviation sustainment to deliver the necessary expeditionary capabilities across the functional areas of aircraft maintenance, aviation supply, avionics, aviation ordnance, and aviation information systems, allowing Marine aviation to thrive at sea and in forward, isolated, austere conditions. ASB coordinates across the Naval Aviation Enterprise and Marine Corps Forces to develop, manage, and improve aviation sustainment capabilities, plans, and policies in support of the total lifecycle management of new and existing aviation platforms and supportingequipment. ASB synthesizes and assesses key performance indicators and material readiness trends across these functional areas to drive improvements in material condition, reliability of repairables and increase aircraft readiness. ASB leverages emerging technologies and concepts to enable modernization of our training systems to ensure our Marines keep pace with the complexity of our aircraft.

The Air Warfare Systems Assault Support (AWS–AS) sustains and enhances MAGTF warfighting capabilities. Marine Assault Support aviation must thrive at sea and in forward, isolated, austere locations while fully integrating into the Naval Expeditionary and Joint Networks. AWS-AS will ensure the MAGTF is able to conduct combat assault support, air delivery, aerial refueling, air evacuation, tactical recovery of aircraft and personnel, and air logistical support missions within the competition continuum against a peer adversary.

The Air Warfare Systems TACAIR (AWS-TACAIR) sustains and enhances MAGTF warfighting capabilities. Marine TACAIR must thrive at sea and in forward, isolated, austere locations while fully integrating into the Naval Expeditionary and Joint Networks. AWS-TACAIR will ensure the MAGTF is able to conduct offensive air support, anti-air warfare, electronic warfare and provide multi-sensor aerial, maritime and terrestrial targeting and coordination within the competition continuum against a peer adversary.

The Air Warfare Systems Unmanned Aerial Systems (AWS–UAS) sustains and enhances MAGTF warfighting capabilities. Marine unmanned aviation must thrive in forward, isolated, austere locations while fully integrating into the Naval Expeditionary and Joint Networks. AWS-UAS ensures the MAGTF provides multi-sensor aerial, maritime and terrestrial looking early warning; provides identification, tracking, targeting and coordination for offensive air support and ground and ship based long range strike; as well as be inherently strike capable within the competition continuum against a peer adversary.

=== Squadrons ===
Squadron insignia for the VMFA-232 Red Devils, the oldest fighter squadron in the Marine Corps

The basic tactical and administrative unit of United States Marine Corps aviation is the squadron. Fixed wing and tilt-rotor aircraft squadrons are denoted by the letter "V", which comes from the French verb "Voler" (to fly). Rotary wing (helicopter) squadrons use "H." Squadrons flying lighter than air vehicles (balloons), which were active from World War I to 1943, were indicated by the letter "Z" in naval squadron designation. Marine squadrons are noted by the second letter "M." Squadron numbering is not linear, as some were numbered in ascending order, and others took numbers from the wing or the ship to which they were assigned. From 1920 to 1941, Marine flying squadrons were identified by one digit numbers. This changed on 1 July 1941 when all existing squadrons were redesignated to a three-digit system. The first two numbers were meant to identify the squadron's parent group, but with the rapid expansion during the war and frequent transfer of squadrons, this system fell apart.

=== Groups ===
The next higher level in Marine Aviation is the Group, the aviation equivalent of a regiment. Groups can be classified as:

- Marine Aircraft Group (MAG): consisting of a MAG Headquarters (MAG HQ), from two to ten fixed-wing, rotary-wing, tilt-rotor, or unmanned aerial vehicle squadrons, a Marine Aviation Logistics Squadron (MALS), and a Marine Wing Support Squadron (MWSS). The MAG HQ provides the staff support necessary for the effective command of the subordinate squadrons of the MAG, while the MALS provides intermediate aircraft maintenance, aviation supply, and aviation ordnance support to the aircraft squadrons. The MWSS provides all essential aviation ground support to the MAG. This support includes: airfield operations and communications (less air traffic control services), motor transport, engineer services (including bulk fuel and aircraft refueling), non-aviation supply and equipment maintenance, local security, medical services, and food services.
- Marine Air Control Group (MACG): consisting of a Marine Air Control Group Headquarters (MACG HQ), a Marine Tactical Air Command Squadron (MTACS), a Marine Air Control Squadron (MACS), a Marine Air Support Squadron (MASS), a Marine Wing Communications Squadron (MWCS), and a Low Altitude Air Defense (LAAD) Battalion.
- Marine Aviation Training Support Group (MATSG): training element to provide support for aviation students (though it is currently often just an administrative support unit for detachments to non-Marine bases).
- Marine Wing Support Group (MWSG): previously, the ground support element for a Marine Air Wing, usually consisted of four Marine Wing Support Squadrons. The Marine Wing Support Groups were disestablished in 2012, with headquarters personnel and Marine Wing Support Squadrons distributed to the Marine Aircraft Groups.

=== Wings ===
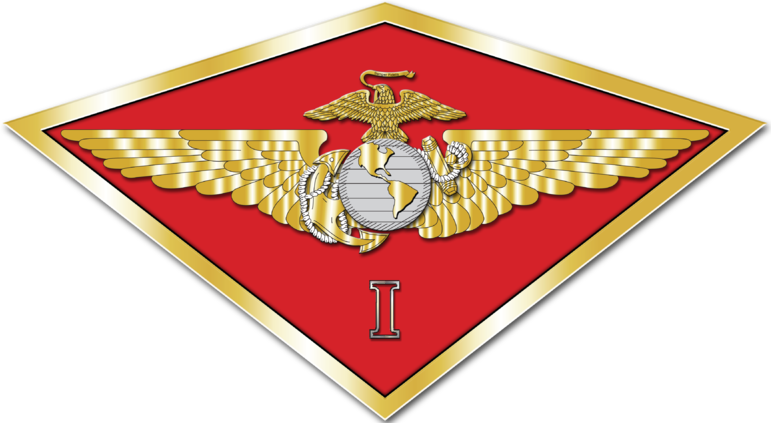
Logo of the 1st Marine Aircraft Wing

The largest level in Marine aviation is the Marine Aircraft Wing (MAW), the equivalent of a division. Wings are usually grouped with a Marine division and a Marine Logistics Group to form a Marine Expeditionary Force. Administratively, Marine aviation is organized into three active duty MAWs and one reserve MAW. MAWs are designed to provide units in support of MAGTF or other operations. Each MAW has a unique organizational structure. The MAW may be reinforced with assets from other MAWs to provide the necessary assets to meet mission requirements. The MAW contains a Marine Aircraft Wing Headquarters (MAW HQ), that directs and coordinates the operations of the MAW, a Marine Wing Headquarters Squadron (MWHS) (see: MWHS-1, MWHS-2 and MWHS-3), which provides administrative and supply support for the MAW HQ, three or four Marine Aircraft Groups (MAGs), and a Marine Air Control Group (MACG). The mission of the MAW is to conduct air operations in support of the Marine Forces to include offensive air support, anti-aircraft warfare, assault support, aerial reconnaissance, electronic warfare, and the control of aircraft and missiles. As a collateral function, the MAW may participate as an integral component of naval aviation in the execution of such other Navy functions as the Fleet Commander may direct.

=== Operational Support Airlift ===
The Operational Support Airlift (OSA) mission is to rapidly deliver small payloads using fixed-wing aircraft in situations where helicopters have inadequate range, and ground transportation is unavailable, slow, subject to enemy attack, or otherwise impractical. To reduce costs and increase efficiency, OSA support is provided by commercial off-the-shelf aircraft rather than relatively complex and maintenance-intensive tactical airlifters. OSA assets are an exception to the standard squadron-group-wing organizational system used by most Marine Corps aviation units; active-duty OSA units report to the air station or base where they are assigned, while reserve OSA units report directly to the 4th MAW rather than a Reserve Component Marine aircraft group. OSA operations are scheduled through the Joint Operational Support Airlift Center. The Marine Corps includes a single OSA squadron, Marine Transport Squadron One (VMR-1), a reserve unit attached to Naval Air Station Joint Reserve Base Fort Worth, while other OSA assets are attached to Headquarters and Headquarters Squadrons at various air stations and air bases. The primary military occupational specialty (MOS) of an OSA aviator is to manage airfield operations at their base or station; flying OSA aircraft is strictly a secondary MOS.

=== Corps ===
All Marine Corps aviation falls under the cognizance of the Deputy Commandant for Aviation (DCA) at Headquarters Marine Corps, with the cooperation of the United States Navy. There, plans for all aspects of aviation are created and managed, including acquisition of new aircraft, training, maintenance, manpower, etc. HQMCA creates Transitional Task Forces to assist units in transitioning between aircraft and aircraft versions.

The Deputy Commandant of Aviation also commands Marine Corps Detachments at Naval Air Weapons Station China Lake and Naval Air Station Patuxent River. The NAS China Lake Marines are responsible to DCA for the test and evaluation of all weapons and weapon systems and for electronic warfare development. While those at NAS Pax River work with Naval Air Systems Command and are responsible for developing, acquiring and supporting naval aeronautical and related technology systems for the operating forces.

== Marine air stations ==
Due to the range and space needed to operate aircraft, each MAW spreads its groups and squadrons amongst several Marine Corps Air Stations (MCAS), as well as offering detachments/liaisons (and occasionally full units) to airports, Air Force Bases and Naval Air Stations. Each MCAS maintains its own base functions as well as air traffic control and facilities (often with a Headquarters and Headquarters Squadron of its own).

== Aviators and flight officers ==
Naval Aviator Badge

All Marine pilots and flight officers are trained and qualified as naval aviators or naval flight officers by the Navy. Prospective aviators receive their commissions and attend The Basic School just as all other Marine officers do, then report to Marine Aviation Training Support Group 21 to attend Aviation Preflight Indoctrination at Naval Air Station Pensacola, Florida. There they receive instruction in aerodynamics, aircraft engines and systems, meteorology, navigation, and flight rules and regulations. Following completion, they are assigned to Primary Flight Training at Marine Aviation Training Support Group 22, Naval Air Station Corpus Christi, Texas, or remain in Pensacola, Florida. Upon successful completion of Primary Flight Training, they select which type of aircraft they would like to fly, in accordance with the needs of the Corps.

After selection, student aviators are assigned to Advanced Flight Training in their particular field (strike, multi-engine, rotary, or tilt-rotor). Upon completion, students are designated as Naval Aviators and are awarded the Naval Aviator Insignia. From that point, they are trained at a Fleet Replacement Squadron for the specific aircraft they will be flying. A few uncommon aircraft are taught by the Navy or Air Force, or in the case of HMX-1, by the company that created the aircraft. After completion, aviators are assigned to their first squadron.

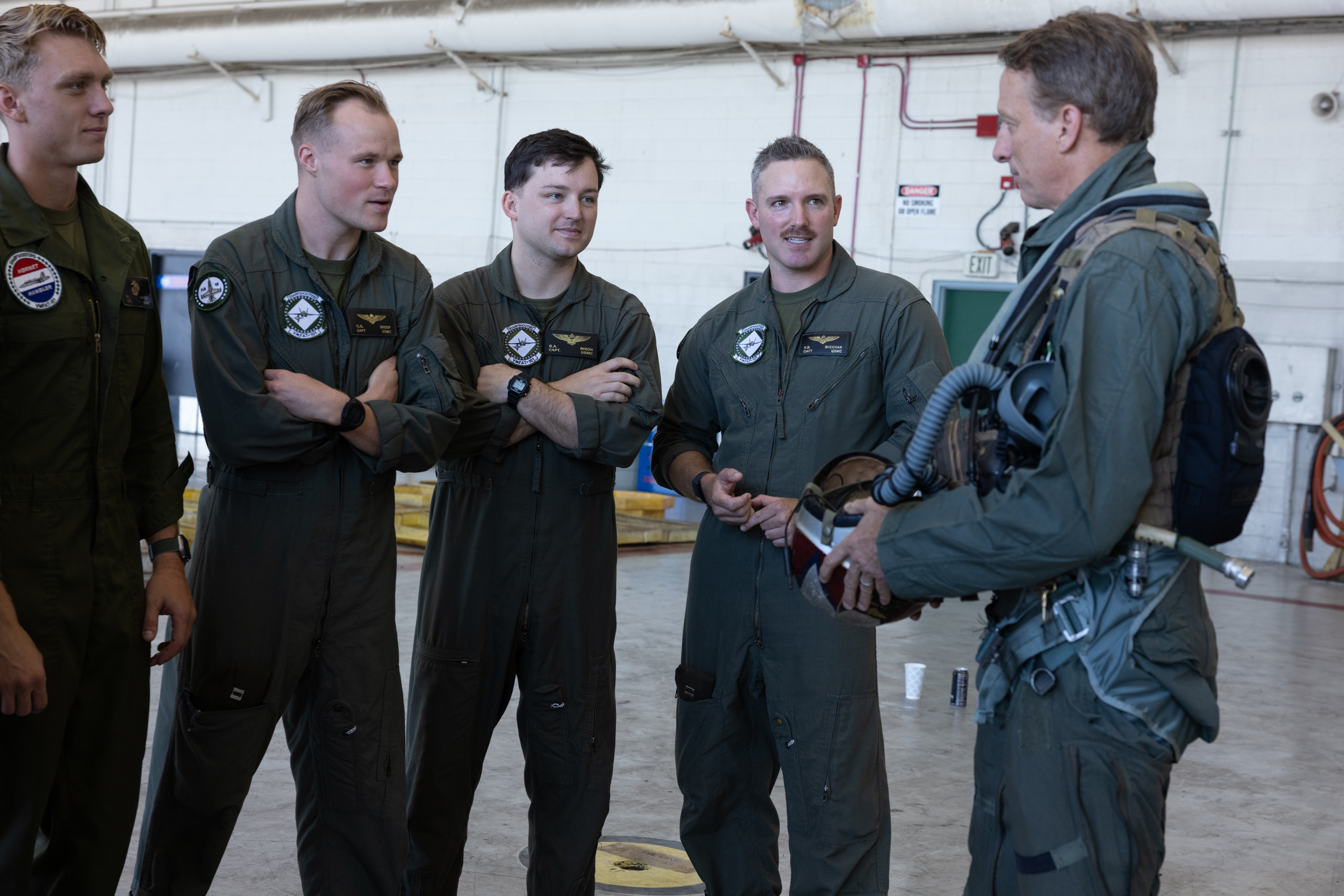
Members of VMFAT-101, the Marine Corps' F/A-18 Hornet training squadron at MCAS Miramar in August 2023

Flight officers, after Aviation Preflight Indoctrination, continue their own training path by staying at Pensacola and training further in navigation and avionics. After Advanced NFO training, they receive their wings and are assigned to their first duty squadron. With the F-35 replacing the F/A-18 Hornet by 2030, the Marine Corps is no longer accepting new Naval Flight Officers.

Student RPA pilots are trained by the Air Force and receive their wings after finishing Undergraduate RPA Pilot Training. Next they are assigned to an Air Force IQT squadron for follow on MQ-9A qualifications and then proceed to their first operational squadron.

Enlisted aircrew also serve on some aircraft (mostly helicopters). They are trained at NAS Pensacola and are eligible to wear the Aircrew insignia.

Marine aviators are eligible to earn medals such as the Distinguished Flying Cross for heroism in combat and the Air Medal for meritorious achievement in flight as well as the Gray Eagle Award for seniority. Pilots in combat have a chance to become flying aces.

== Aircraft ==
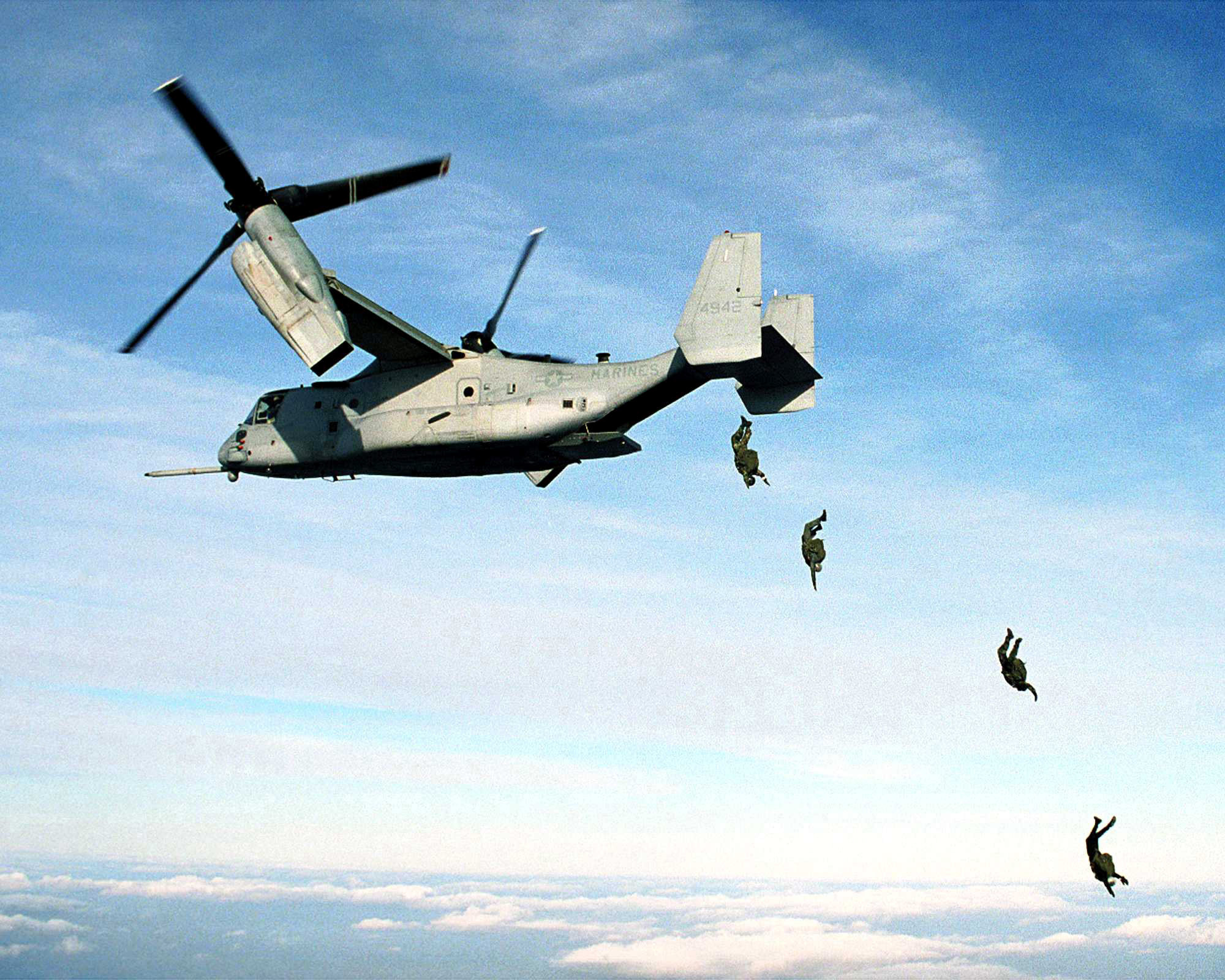
MV-22B with Marine paratroopers

Marine light attack helicopter squadrons (HMLA) are composite squadrons of AH-1Z Viper attack helicopters and UH-1Y Venom utility helicopters. These provide light-attack and light transport utility capabilities. Marine medium tilt-rotor (VMM) squadrons fly the V-22 Osprey, a tilt-rotor transport aircraft. Marine heavy helicopter (HMH) squadrons fly the CH-53E Super Stallion helicopter for heavy-lift missions. These will eventually be replaced with the upgraded CH-53K, currently under development.

Marine attack squadrons (VMA) fly the AV-8 Harrier II; while Marine Fighter-Attack (VMFA) and Marine (All Weather) Fighter-Attack (VMFA(AW)) squadrons, respectively fly both the single-seat (F/A-18C) and dual-seat (F/A-18D) versions of the F/A-18 Hornet strike-fighter aircraft. The AV-8B is a VTOL aircraft that can operate from amphibious assault ships, land air bases and short, expeditionary airfields. The F/A-18 can only be flown from land or aircraft carriers. Both are slated to be replaced by the F-35B, the STOVL version of the F-35 Lightning II. The Marine Corps will also purchase 80 of the F-35C carrier variants, enough for five squadrons, to serve with Navy carrier air wings. The Corps operates its own aerial refueling assets in the form of the KC-130J Super Hercules. In Marine transport refueling (VMGR) squadrons, the Hercules doubles as a ground refueller and tactical-airlift transport aircraft.

With the addition of the ISR / Weapon Mission Kit, the KC-130J will be able to serve as an overwatch aircraft and can deliver ground support fire in the form of 30mm cannon fire, Hellfire or Griffin missiles, and precision-guided bombs. This capability, designated as "Harvest HAWK" (Hercules Airborne Weapons Kit), can be used in scenarios where precision is not a requisite, such as area denial, and was first used in Afghanistan in late 2010. Serving in Marine Tactical Electronic Warfare (VMAQ) Squadrons until its retirement in 2019, the EA-6B Prowler was the main tactical electronic warfare aircraft left in the U.S. inventory, until Navy squadrons replaced it with the EA-18G Growler.

Based on the two-seat F/A-18F Super Hornet, the Growler has been labeled a "national asset" and is frequently borrowed to assist in any American combat action, not just Marine operations. Since the retirement of the EF-111A Raven in 1998, the Air Force's only EW aircraft, Marine Corps and Navy aircraft have provided electronic warfare support to Air Force units.

Marine Fighter Training Squadron 401 (VMFT-401) operates F-5 Tiger II aircraft in support of air combat adversary (aggressor) training. Marine Helicopter Squadron One (HMX-1) operates the VH-3D Sea King medium-lift and VH-60N Nighthawk light-lift helicopters in the VIP transport role, previously planned to be replaced by the cancelled VH-71 Kestrel. OSA assets include several aircraft that transport VIPs and critical logistics: the UC-12F/W Huron, C-20G Gulfstream IV, UC-35D Citation Encore, and C-40A Clipper. A single Marine Corps C-130J "Fat Albert," is used to support the U.S. Navy's flight demonstration team, the "Blue Angels".

=== Current inventory ===
| Aircraft | Origin | Type | Variant | In service | Notes |
Combat Aircraft
| F/A-18 Hornet | United States | multirole | F/A-18A/C/D | 138 | |
| F-35 Lightning II | United States | multirole | F-35B/C | 127 | 29 used for training - 303 on order |
| MQ-9A Reaper | United States | multirole | | 4 | 14 on order |
Tanker
| KC-130 Super Hercules | United States | aerial refueling | C-130J | 64 | |
Transport
| UC-12 Huron | United States | utility / transport | | 15 | 1 on order |
| C-20G Grey Ghost | United States | VIP transport | | 1 | |
| UC-35D Citation Encore | United States | VIP transport | | 10 | |
| C-40A Clipper | United States | transport | | 2 | |
Helicopter
| AH-1Z Viper | United States | attack | | 159 | |
| CH-53E Super Stallion | United States | heavy lift | | 140 | |
| CH-53K King Stallion | United States | heavy lift | | 9 | 191 on order |
| MV-22 Osprey | United States | multi-mission / transport | MV-22B | 289 | 13 on order |
| SH-3 Sea King | United States | VIP transport | VH-3D | 7 | used by HMX-1 "Marine One" for presidential transport |
| UH-1Y Venom | United States | utility | | 160 | |
| VH-60 Presidential Hawk | United States | VIP transport | VH-60N | 8 | used by HMX-1 "Marine One" for presidential transport |
Trainer Aircraft
| CH-92A Patriot | United States | helicopter trainer | | 1 | 1 more training craft on order |
| F-5 Tiger II | United States | jet trainer | F-5F/N | 12 | OpFor training |
| F/A-18 Hornet | United States | conversion trainer | F/A-18B/C/D | 46 | |
| F-35 Lightning II | United States | conversion trainer | F-35B/C | 29 | |
| T-34 Mentor | United States | trainer | | 4 | |
| TAV-8B Harrier II | United States | conversion trainer | TAV-8 | 12 | V/STOL capable aircraft |

=== Gallery ===
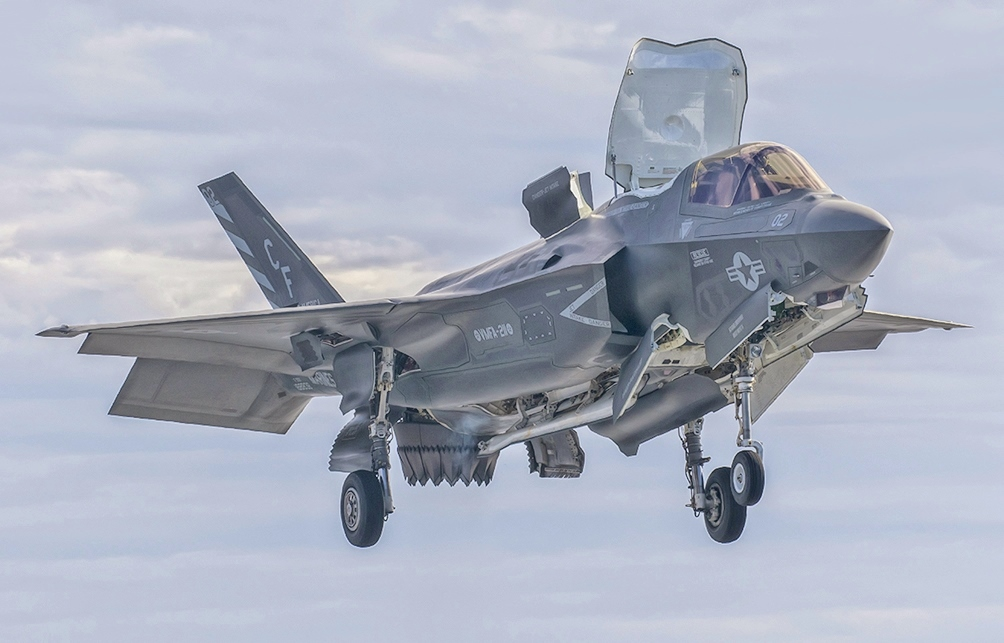
An F-35B hovering over the USS America

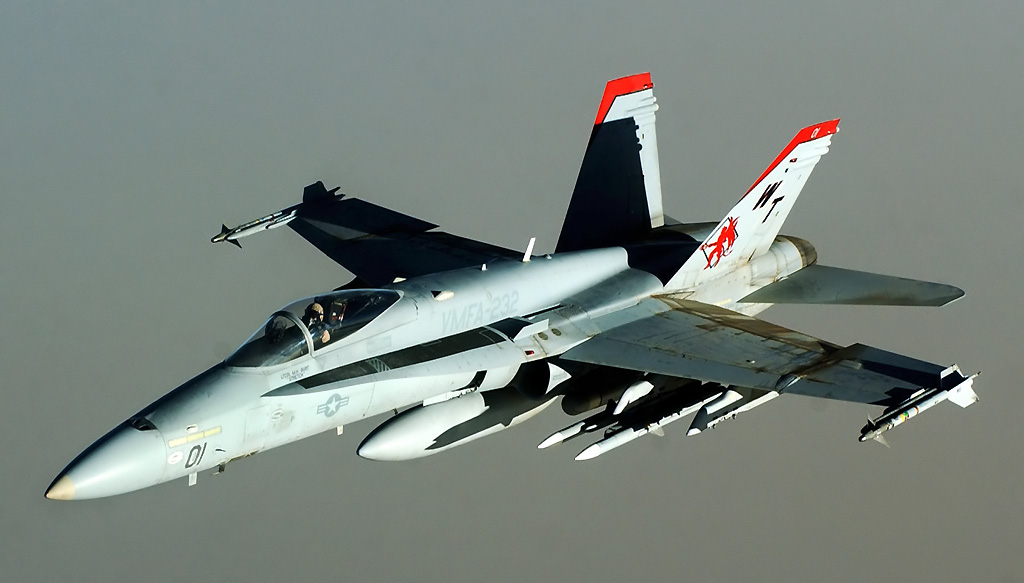
An F/A-18C of VMFA-232

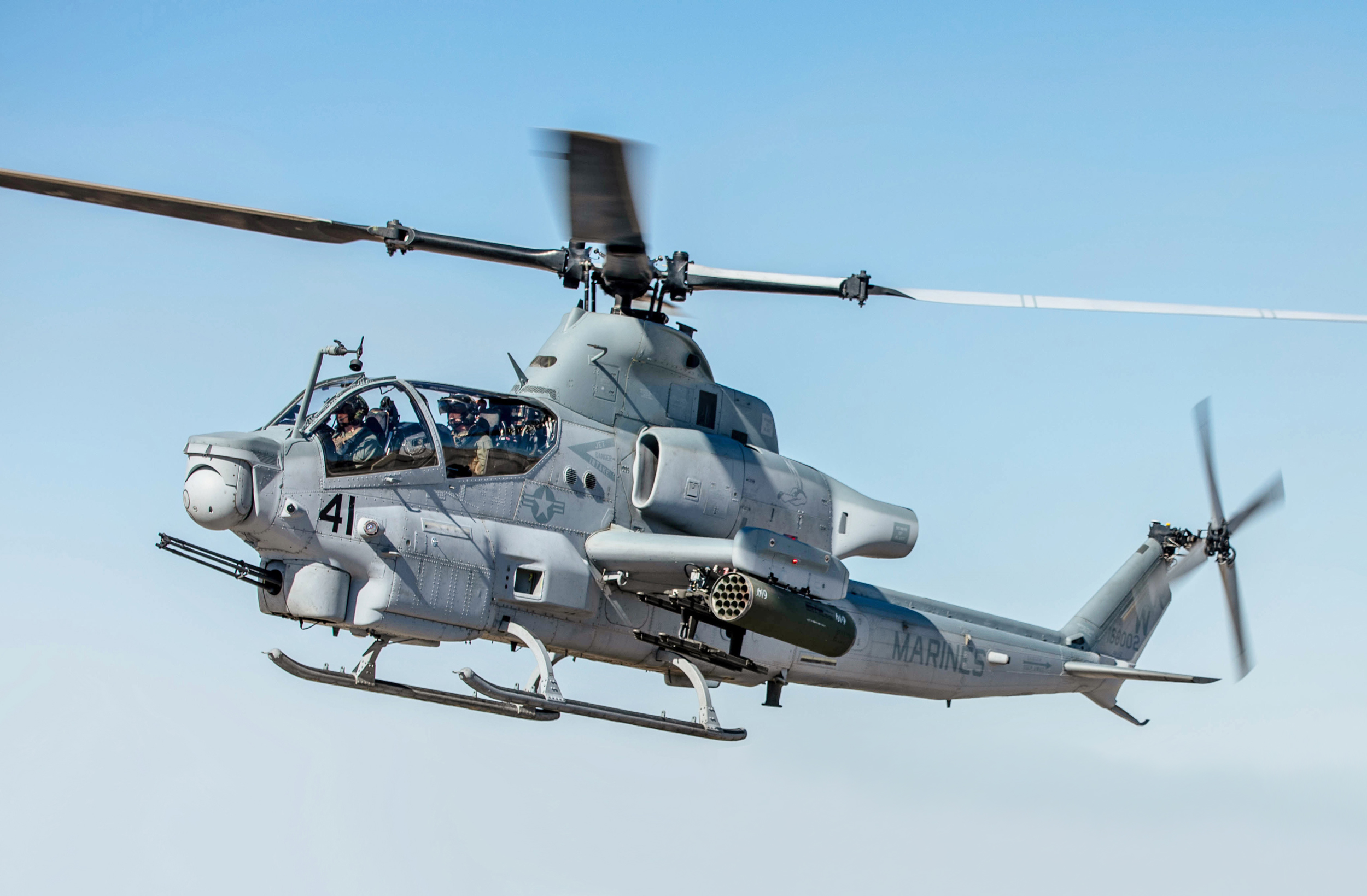
The AH-1Z is the latest variant of the Bell AH-1 Cobra attack helicopter series

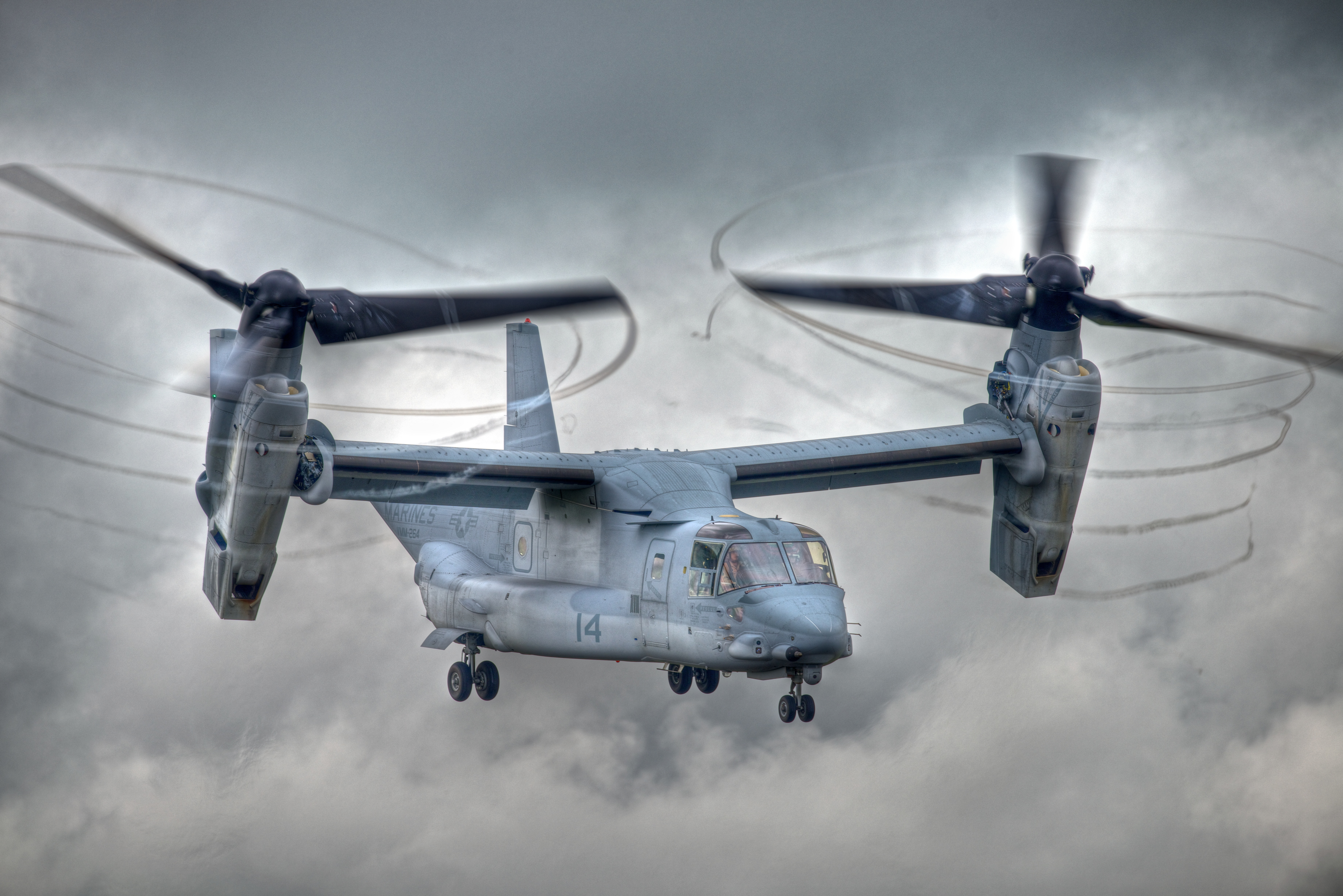
An MV-22 tilt-rotor aircraft

=== Armaments ===
Guns

- GAU-12 25 mm Gatling gun
- GAU-16/A 12.7×99mm machine gun
- GAU-17/A 7.62×51mm NATO automatic gun
- GAU-2B/A 7.62×51mm NATO automatic gun
- GAU-4 20 mm Vulcan (M61)
- M39 revolver cannon 20 mm
- M197 Gatling gun

Bombs

- CBU-100 Mk-20 Rockeye II cluster bomb
- GBU-10 2000 lb laser-guided bomb
- GBU-12 500 lb laser-guided bomb
- GBU-16 1000 lb laser-guided bomb
- MK82 series 500 lb bomb
- MK83 series 1000 lb bomb
- MK84 series 2000 lb bomb
- Mark 77 bomb

Missiles

- AGM-65 Maverick Missile
- AGM-84 Harpoon Missile
- AGM-88 High-Speed Anti-radiation Missile (HARM)
- AGM-114 Hellfire (Helicopter launched fire-and-forget)
- AIM-7 Sparrow
- AIM-9 Sidewinder (anti-air) Missile
- AIM-120 AMRAAM

Rockets

- Hydra 70
- M260 70 mm Rocket Launcher

== See also ==
- Marine One
- Cactus Air Force
- Aviation Combat Element
- Flying Leatherneck Aviation Museum
- List of active United States military aircraft
- List of United States Marine Corps astronauts
- List of United States Marine Corps air stations
- List of United States Marine Corps aircraft wings
- List of United States Marine Corps aircraft groups
- List of United States Marine Corps aviation support units
- List of active United States Marine Corps aircraft squadrons
- List of decommissioned United States Marine Corps aircraft squadrons
- List of currently active United States Army aircraft
- List of currently active United States naval aircraft
- List of active United States Air Force aircraft
- Prosecution of Daniel Duggan
