= Marine Wing Headquarters Squadron 3 =

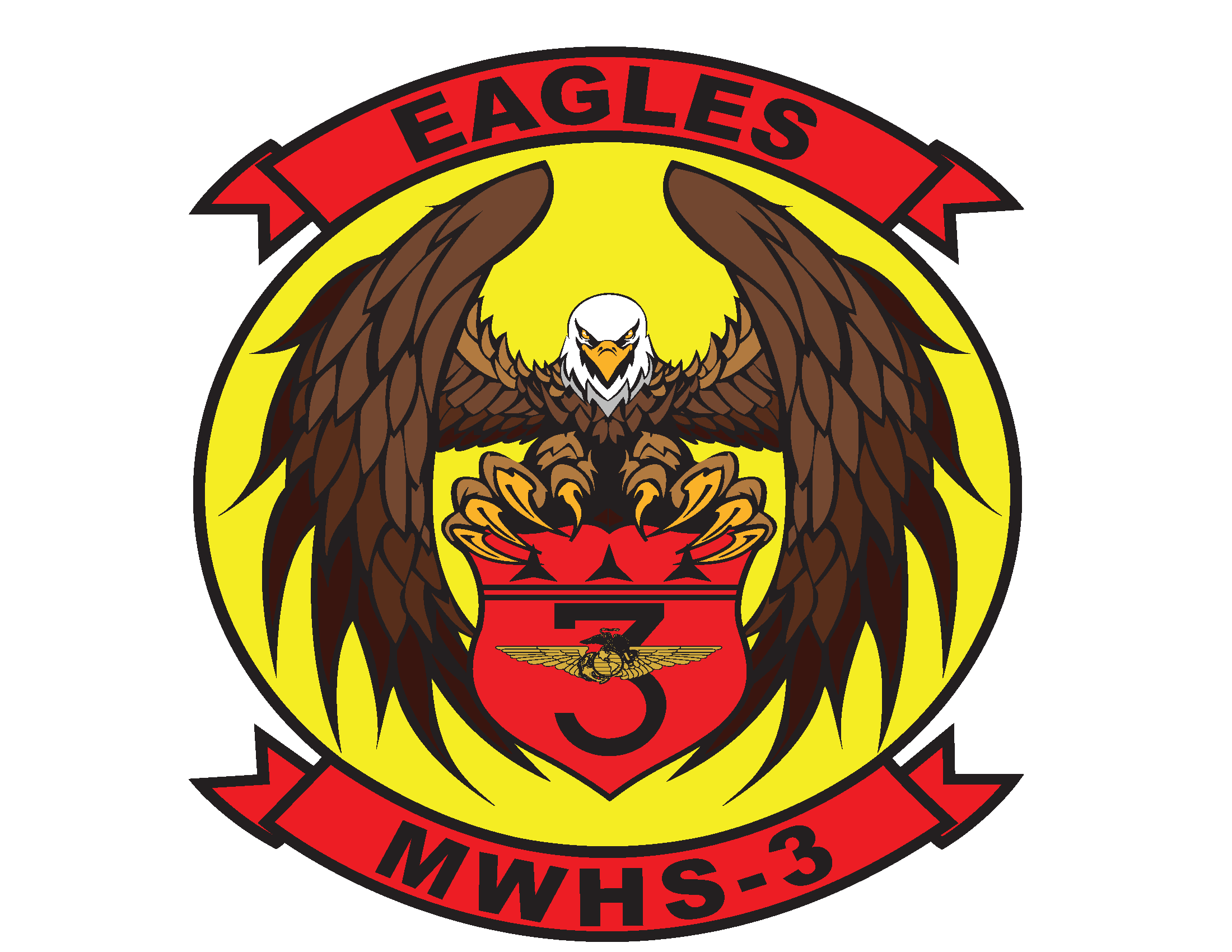
- MWHS-3 official logo
- Active: 10 Nov 1942 – 31 Dec 45 1 Feb 52 – present
- Country: United States
- Allegiance: United States of America
- Branch: United States Marine Corps
- Role: Headquarters
- Part of: 3rd Marine Aircraft Wing; I Marine Expeditionary Force
- Garrison/HQ: Marine Corps Air Station Miramar
- Engagements: World War II; Operation Desert Storm; Operation Enduring Freedom; Operation Iraqi Freedom

Commanders
- Current commander: LtCol Thomas E. Bolen, Jr.

Marine Wing Headquarters Squadron 3 is the headquarters element of the 3rd Marine Aircraft Wing and is located at Marine Corps Air Station Miramar, California.

== Mission ==
The mission of Marine Wing Headquarters Squadron 3 is to provide administrative and supply support for the 3rd Marine Aircraft Wing Headquarters.

== History ==
MWHS 3 was activated 10 November 1942 at Marine Corps Air Station Cherry Point, North Carolina, as Headquarters Squadron 3, 3rd Marine Aircraft Wing. They were deployed during April–May 1944 to Ewa, territory of Hawaii. The squadron was deactivated on 31 December 1945.

The squadron was reactivated on 1 February 1952 at MCAS Cherry Point, North Carolina, as Headquarters Squadron 3 (HS-3), 3rd Marine Aircraft Wing. It was relocated during May 1952 to Miami, Florida and again relocated during September 1955 to MCAS El Toro, California. HS-3 was reassigned during January 1956 to Marine Wing Headquarters Group 3, 3rd Marine Aircraft Wing, Air, Fleet Marine Force, Pacific.

Redesignated 1 July 1971 as Marine Wing Headquarters Squadron 3, 3rd Marine Aircraft Wing, Fleet Marine Force, Pacific. The Squadron participated in Operation Desert Shield and Operation Desert Storm, Southwest Asia, September 1990 – May 1991. They relocated again in October 1998 to MCAS Miramar, California.

Redesignated 1 November 1999 as Headquarters and Service Company, Marine Tactical Air Command Squadron 38, Marine Air Control Group 38, 3D Marine Aircraft Wing, U.S. Marine Forces Pacific. Redesignated 15 February 2002 as Marine Wing Headquarters Squadron 3, 3rd Marine Aircraft Wing, U.S. Marine Forces Pacific. They have deployed to Kuwait and Iraq in support of Operation Iraqi Freedom, since January 2003 and have been on rotation with Marine Wing Headquarters Squadron 2.

== See also ==
- United States Marine Corps Aviation
- List of United States Marine Corps aviation support units
