= Prosecution of Daniel Duggan =

2022 U.S. prosecution

Daniel Duggan
- Born: 1969 (age 56–57)
- Citizenship: Australian
- Occupation: Former U.S. Marine Corps pilot
- Spouse: Saffrine Duggan
- Children: 6

Daniel Edmund Duggan (born 1969) is a former U.S. Marine Corps pilot. He renounced his U.S. citizenship, became an Australian citizen in 2012, and was arrested in October 2022 at the request of the U.S. government seeking his extradition based on charges of arms trafficking, specifically training Chinese fighter pilots to land jets on aircraft carriers and laundering money. Duggan has denied the charges.

== Background ==
Daniel Edmund Duggan was a member of the United States Marine Corps where he became a fighter and instructor pilot during his service. He spent 13 years in the Marine Corps until 2002, when he left with the rank of major. From 2005 to 2014, he lived in Australia where he founded Top Gun Tasmania, a business that offered clients joy flights on military jet trainers. During this time he also became an Australian citizen.

In 2014 he moved to Beijing where he worked as an aviation consultant, selling Top Gun Tasmania in the process. While he was in Beijing, Duggan shared an address with Chinese businessman Su Bin who, according to two sources interviewed by Reuters, Duggan worked with. Both men worked for a South African flight school called the Test Flying Academy of South Africa (TFASA). According to an aviation source, Bin arranged for Chinese Peoples Liberation Army pilots to undertake TFASA training courses while Duggan trained Chinese pilots for TFASA. The address that Duggan and Bin shared appeared on the U.S. Entity List in August 2014 and in 2016, Bin was jailed in the US for his role in a hacking case that involved the theft of US military aircraft designs. In 2016 Duggan renounced his U.S. citizenship, backdated to 2012, at the U.S. embassy in Beijing.

Since 2017 Duggan had been general manager of AVIBIZ Limited, a comprehensive consultancy company with a focus on the Chinese aviation industry until its dissolution in 2020. Duggan continued to work in China prior to his return to and arrest in Australia.

== Prosecution ==
=== Arrest, charges and detention ===
Duggan was arrested on October 21, 2022, in Orange, New South Wales, pursuant to an American warrant. The warrant was based on a 2017 indictment alleging four charges: conspiracy to defraud the United States by conspiring to unlawfully export defense services to China, conspiracy to launder money, and two counts of violating the Arms Export Control Act and international traffic in arms regulations. The indictment alleged that Duggan did not seek approval from the U.S. government to provide military training to China, despite the fact that the State Department had informed him by email in 2008 that he was required to do so to train a foreign air force. It also alleged that Duggan worked with unnamed co-conspirators, including a British executive of "a test flying academy based in South Africa with a presence in the PRC", and a Chinese national who acquired military information for the Chinese military.

TFASA denied the accusations, saying that all of Duggan's instructions were legal and followed international norms, adding that it followed a "code of conduct" to make sure that no material would be classified or considered sensitive from a legal or operational standpoint. Duggan also denied the accusations, saying he had trained only civilians, never military pilots.

After Duggan's arrest, Britain investigated its former military pilots who helped train Chinese military fliers, as did other Western governments after reports surfaced of their former pilots who had performed similar work. In a February 2023 speech, the head of the Australian Security Intelligence Organisation (ASIO) criticised former military pilots who worked for authoritarian regimes, and in June 2023 TFASA was added to the U.S. Entity List.

Duggan has been categorized as an Extreme High-Risk Restricted and Protection Non-Association prisoner. He is being held in a two-by-four-meter cell at Lithgow Correctional Centre. A complaint filed by Duggan's wife and legal team with the United Nations human rights committee alleged that Duggan's imprisonment at a maximum security site was unjustified and was causing him severe psychological distress. The complaint also alleged that Duggan was not receiving appropriate treatment for his "benign prostatic hyperplasia" (enlarged prostate). The complaint included the testimony of a clinical psychologist who evaluated Duggan and characterized the circumstances of his confinement as "extreme" and "inhumane", and said that he was at risk of developing a serious depressive disorder, despite having never suffered from mental health issues before.

In March 2023, following a preliminary investigation into a complaint by Duggan over the legality of his incarceration, the Australian Inspector General of Intelligence and Security began a formal inquiry into his detention. Duggan's legal team argued that an ASIO clearance for an Australian aviation security identification card was used unlawfully to entice him to return to Australia, where he was arrested. The use of such a lure is illegal under Australian law.

=== Extradition ===
Duggan's attorneys are looking into if the U.S. "lured" him back to Australia with the help of Australian security services to extradite him. Duggan's lawyer, Dennis Miralis, stated that while ASIO gave Duggan a security clearance to acquire an aviation license in 2022 while he was still in China, that clearance was revoked a few days after he arrived in Australia. Trent Glover, a lawyer for the US government, said the Department of Justice would file an extradition request before December 20 and that from the point of view of the United States, the request was a normal part of the extradition process. Duggan stated from prison that he risks "gross injustice" and a "cruelly long sentence" if extradited to the U.S., cautioning Australia against caving into the requests of "powerful countries." Duggan believes he will not receive a fair trial in America, where he risks up to 60 years in jail on charges related to training Chinese pilots.

In May 2024, a magistrate ruled that Duggan could be extradited to the U.S., after his lawyers could not find any argument against his extradition.. On April 16, 2026, Australian Federal Court Justice James Stellios ruled in dismissing the appeal that no jurisdiction error was made in 2024 by then Attorney-General Mark Dreyfus in ordering Duggan's extradition to the United States.

== Other developments ==
In September 2023, Defence Minister Richard Marles announced that he would introduce laws into the Australian parliament to prevent Australian military personnel being recruited by other countries.
