= Marine Wing Headquarters Squadron 2 =

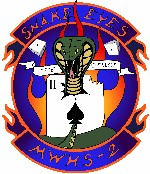
- MWHS-2 insignia
- Active: 31 December 1955
- Country: United States
- Branch: United States Marine Corps
- Role: Headquarters
- Part of: 2nd Marine Aircraft Wing; II Marine Expeditionary Force
- Garrison/HQ: MCAS Cherry Point
- Nicknames: "Snake Eyes" "The Deuce"
- Engagements: Operation Iraqi Freedom

Commanders
- Current commander: LtCol Anthony Cesaro (May 2022 -

Marine Wing Headquarters Squadron 2 is the headquarters element of the 2nd Marine Aircraft Wing and is located at Marine Corps Air Station Cherry Point

== History ==
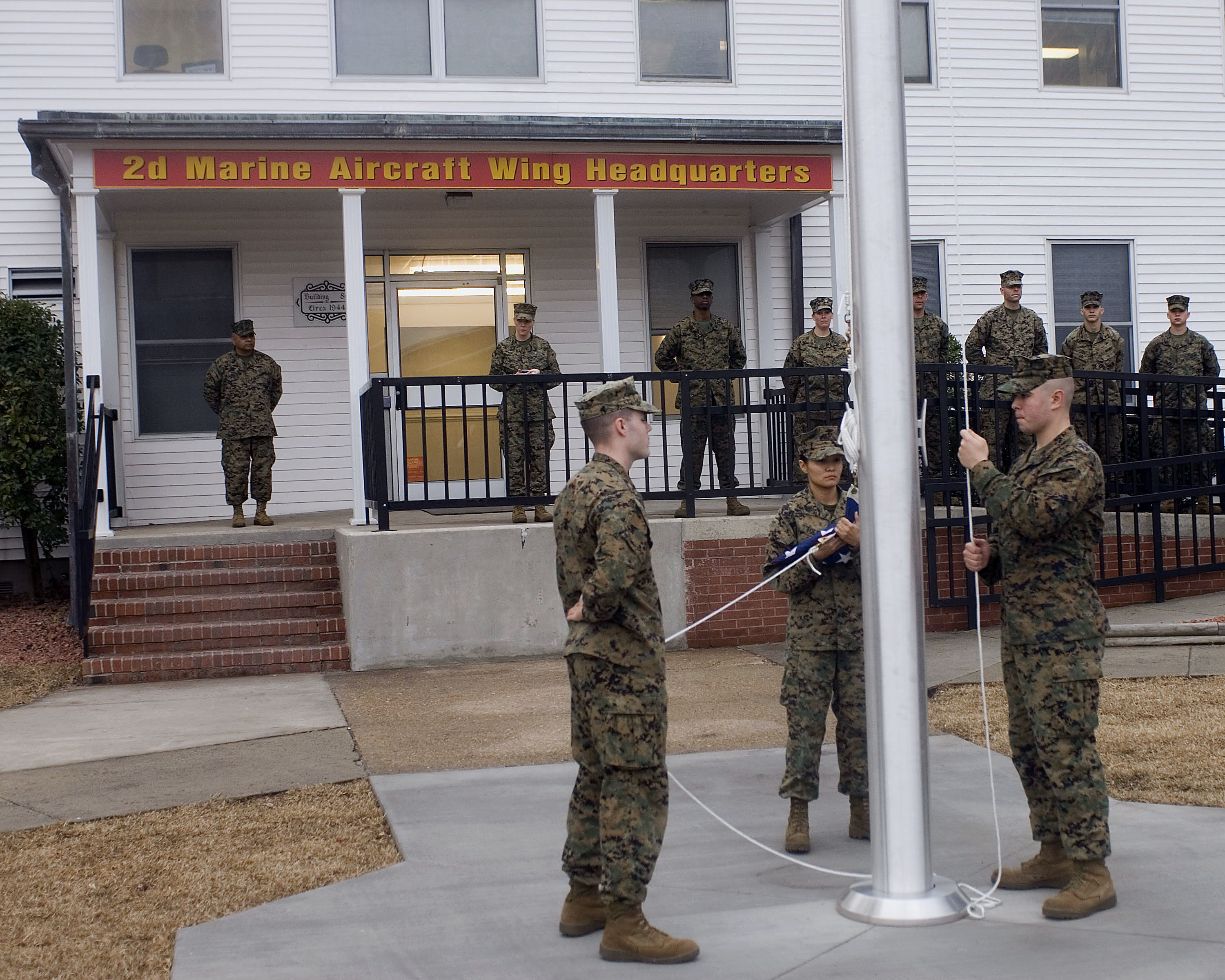
Marines from MWHS-2 prepare to raise the colors at the 2nd MAW headquarters

Commissioned on 31 December 1955, Marine Wing Headquarters Group 2 was garrisoned at Marine Corps Air Station, Cherry Point, North Carolina with the 2nd Marine Aircraft Wing. At that time, the unit was composed of Headquarters and Headquarters Squadron 2, Marine Air Support Squadron 1, and Marine Air Control Squadron 7 and Marine Air Control Squadron 8. In May 1966, MWSG-2 was decommissioned. Through further reorganization in August 1967, MWSG-2 was reactivated and assumed the responsibilities of supporting the Marine Wing Headquarters. On 1 July 1971, MWSG-2 was re-designated to the current title of Marine Wing Headquarters Squadron 2.

Marine Wing Headquarters Squadron 2 has traditionally been a non-deployable Marine Corps unit, though it supports the war on terror through individual augments to deploying units. The unit deployed as a whole for the first time in February 2005 until February 2006 where it was deployed to Al Asad Airbase in the Al Anbar Province Iraq where it raised its new unit colors and squadron logo (known as Snake Eyes) designed and created solely by Sgt James Fife. It operated for a second time in Al Asad from February 2007 until March 2008 and deployed a third time to Al Asad from January 2009 until November 2009.

== See also ==
- United States Marine Corps Aviation
- List of United States Marine Corps aviation support units
