= HMH-463 =

Marine Heavy Helicopter Squadron 463
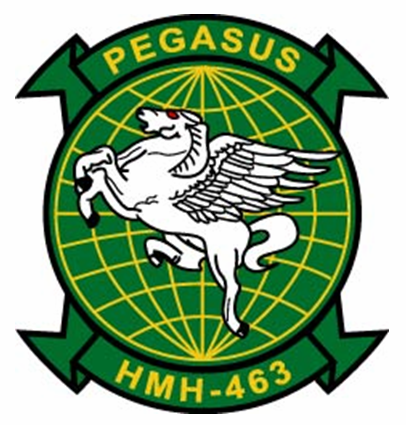
- HMH-463 Unit insignia
- Active: 20 July 1944 – 28 July 1945; 15 July 1945 - 20 March 1946; 1 September 1958 – 30 June 1959; 1 March 1966 - 22 April 2022
- Country: United States
- Branch: USMC
- Type: Heavy Helicopter Squadron
- Role: Assault Support
- Nickname: "Pegasus"
- Tail Code: YH
- Engagements: Vietnam War * Operation Eagle Pull * Operation Frequent Wind; Operation Desert Storm; Operation Iraqi Freedom; Operation Enduring Freedom

Marine Heavy Helicopter Squadron 463 (HMH-463) was a United States Marine Corps helicopter squadron consisting of CH-53E Super Stallion transport helicopters. The squadron, also known as "Pegasus", was last based at Marine Corps Air Station Kaneohe Bay in Hawaii and fell under the command of Marine Aircraft Group 24 (MAG-24) and the 1st Marine Aircraft Wing (1st MAW). HMH-463 was decommissioned in April 2022 as part of the Commandant of the Marine Corps Force Design 2030 initiative.

== Mission ==
Provide assault support transport of combat troops, supplies and equipment during expeditionary, joint or combined operations. Be prepared for short-notice, worldwide employment in support of Marine Air-Ground Task Force operations.

== History ==
=== Early years ===
The squadron was originally activated as Marine Bombing Squadron 463 (VMB-463), a fixed-wing bombing squadron, on 20 July 1944 at Marine Corps Air Station Cherry Point in North Carolina, and assigned to Marine Aircraft Group 62, 9th Marine Aircraft Wing. In November 1944, the squadron was reassigned to Marine Aircraft Group 34. The following February, the squadron was reassigned to Marine Operational Training Group 81 only to be decommissioned on 28 July 1945. On 15 July 1945, the squadron was reactivated at Marine Corps Air Station Santa Barbara as Marine Torpedo Bombing Squadron 463 (VMTB-463) and assigned to Marine Aircraft Group 51. The following year, on 20 March 1946, the squadron was once again decommissioned and would remain so until 1958. The squadron was reactivated on 1 September 1958 at Marine Corps Air Station Santa Ana, California, as Marine Helicopter Transport Squadron 463 and assigned to Marine Air Group 36, 3rd Marine Aircraft Wing and then decommissioned again less than a year later on 30 June 1959.

=== Vietnam War ===
Marine Heavy Helicopter Squadron 463 was reactivated on March 1, 1966, at MCAS Santa Ana and assigned to Marine Wing Support Group 37, 3rd Marine Aircraft Wing flying the CH-53 Sea Stallion airframe. A four-plane detachment from HMH-463 deployed to Marble Mountain Air Facility in South Vietnam in January 1967 and was assigned to Marine Aircraft Group 16. The remainder of the squadron would deploy during May 1967 to Marble Mountain where they participated in combat operations during the Vietnam War for the next four years. On 8 January 1968, CH-53A #65-100 crashed in the Hải Lăng Forest south of Đông Hà Combat Base, killing all 46 personnel on board. One of the more different flights taken by the squadron occurred in 1968 when they participated in Operation Barroom. This entailed delivering an elephant via helicopter from the airstrip at Chu Lai Air Base to the Special Forces camp at Tra Bong to work at a local saw mill. This operation became the inspiration for the Disney movie Operation Dumbo Drop released in 1995. 1970 saw the squadron start to delve into bombing missions or what they termed "barrel bombing." During this time they would fly 2 - 4 ship flights at low altitude to draw enemy fire. Once they encountered enemy contact they would then fly over the area again and drop 55 gallon drums of gasoline and napalm that were sling-loaded to the bottom of the aircraft. Usually the force of impact would ignite the barrel mixture but they would occasionally need machine gun fire from the helicopter door guns or rockets from an OV-10 Bronco or AH-1 Cobra. On a mission over "Charlie Ridge" just west of Danang the squadron dropped over 400 tons of the fuel mixture against entrenched North Vietnamese Army positions. After the Vietnam War, HMH-463 relocated to Marine Corps Air Station Kaneohe Bay in Hawaii in May 1971 and was reassigned to Marine Aircraft Group 24, 1st Marine Brigade.

In 1973, HMH-463 returned to Vietnam and participated in Operation End Sweep, the minesweeping operations in the Haiphong–Hon Gai area of North Vietnam from February through July.

On 26 March 1975, HMH-463 embarked on the USS Hancock at Pearl Harbor and the Hancock proceeded to Subic Bay and then on station in the Gulf of Thailand. On 12 April 1975, the squadron participated in Operation Eagle Pull, the evacuation of Phnom Penh and 17 days later it participated in Operation Frequent Wind, the evacuation of Saigon. For its efforts during the U.S. evacuation of South Vietnam, HMH-463 was awarded the "Outstanding Helicopter Squadron of the Year" award by the Marine Corps Aviation Association in 1975.

=== 1990s ===
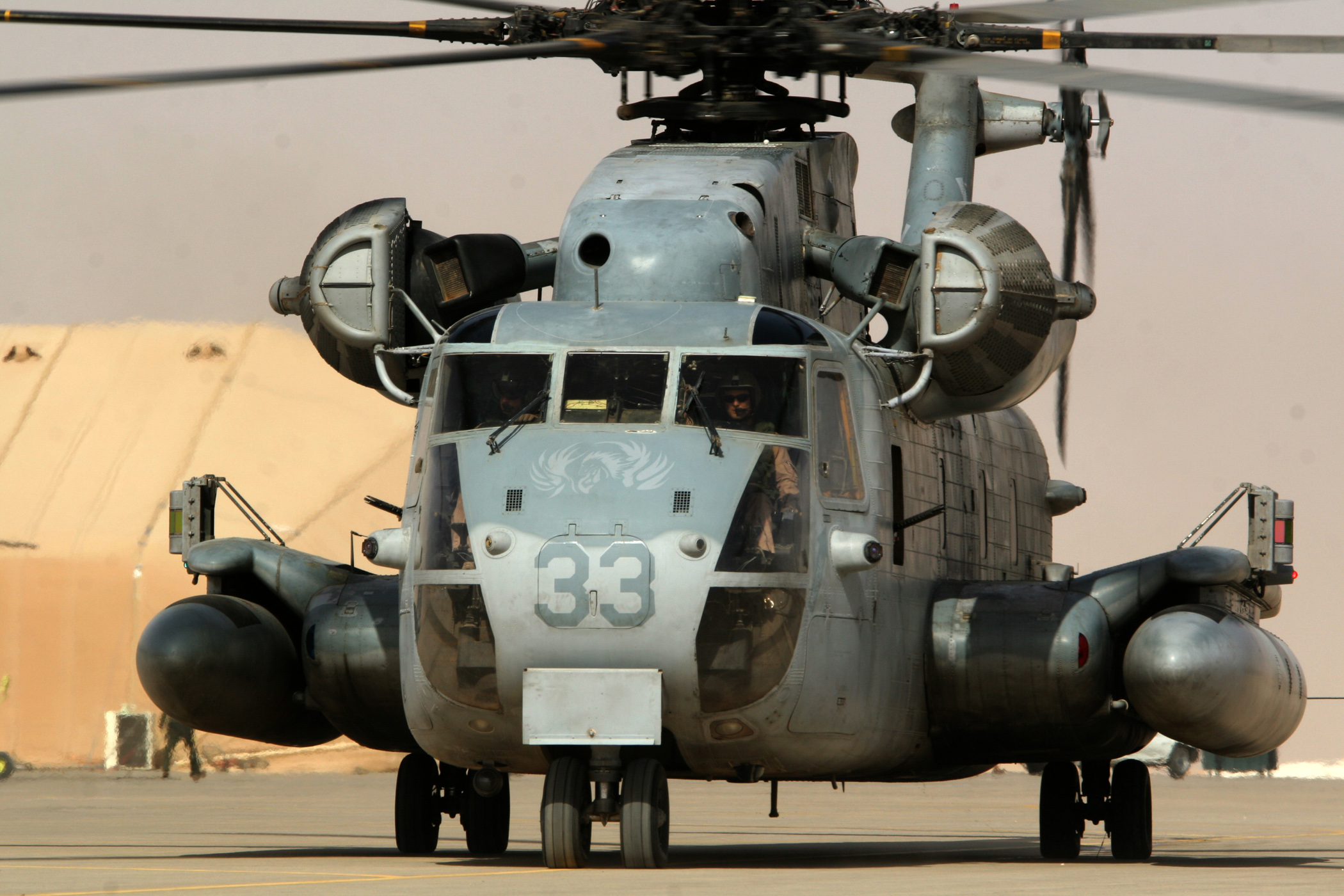
A CH-53 Sea Stallion from HMH-463 taxiing in Iraq in June 2006

In August 1990, HMH-463 deployed to Saudi Arabia to take part in Operation Desert Shield. The squadron remained in Southwest Asia to participate in Operation Desert Storm before returning to MCAF Kaneohe Bay in March 1991.

=== 2000s ===
In March 2006, HMH-463 deployed in support of Operation Iraqi Freedom (OIF), making it the first individual CH-53D unit to be deployed to Iraq, but not the first CH-53D to enter the country for OIF/OEF. The squadron returned to MCAF Kaneohe Bay in October 2006 after being relieved by HMH-363.

In August 2009, HMH 463 deployed to the Helmand Province, Afghanistan, in support of Operation Enduring Freedom. By the end of 2011, HMH-463 had retired all of its CH-53D helicopters. The unit completed the transition to the CH-53E in 2012.

On 14 January 2016 twelve Hawaii Marines were killed when two CH-53E Super Stallion helicopters collided off of Oahu’s North Shore.

HMH-463 was decommissioned on April 22, 2022, during a ceremony held at MCAS Kaneohe Bay. The squadron's stand down was part of a restructure of Marine Corps forces in Hawaii as part of the Commandant of the Marine Corps Force Design 2030 initiative.

== Unit awards ==
A unit citation or commendation is an award bestowed upon an organization for the action cited. Members of the unit who participated in said actions are allowed to wear on their uniforms the awarded unit citation. HMH-463 has been presented with the following awards:

| Ribbon | Unit Award |
|---|---|
| | Presidential Unit Citation |
| | Navy Unit Commendation with three Bronze Star |
| | Meritorious Unit Commendation with one Silver Star and two Bronze Stars |
| | World War II Victory Medal |
| | National Defense Service Medal with two Bronze Star |
| | Armed Forces Expeditionary Medal |
| | Vietnam Service Medal with two Silver Stars and one Bronze Star |
| | Southwest Asia Service Medal with two Bronze Stars |
| | Vietnam Cross of Gallantry with Palm Streamer |
| | Vietnam Meritorious Unit Citation Civil Action Medal |
| | Iraq Campaign Medal |
| | Global War on Terrorism Service Medal |

== See also ==
- United States Marine Corps Aviation
- Organization of the United States Marine Corps
- List of active United States Marine Corps aircraft squadrons
- List of inactive United States Marine Corps aircraft squadrons
