= List of 1st Marine Aircraft Wing commanders =

American military unit commanders

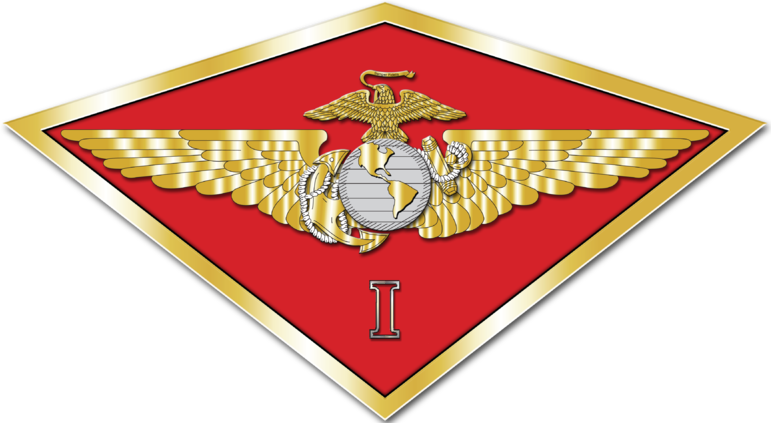
1st Marine Aircraft Wing Logo

The 1st Marine Aircraft Wing is an aviation unit of the United States Marine Corps that serves as the Aviation Combat Element of the III Marine Expeditionary Force. The wing is headquartered at Marine Corps Air Station Futenma on the island of Okinawa, Japan. Activated in 1941, the wing has seen heavy combat operations during World War II, the Korean War, and the Vietnam War.

== Commanding generals ==
#	Picture	Name	Rank	Start	End	Notability	Ref
1		Louis E. Woods	Lieutenant colonel	7 July 1941	20 August 1941	Veteran Guadalcanal Campaign, veteran Okinawa Campaign, Navy Distinguished Service Medal, Commander of the Most Excellent Order of the British Empire; commanding general, 2nd Marine Aircraft Wing	
2		Roy S. Geiger	Colonel	20 August 1941	21 April 1943	Navy Cross; commanding general Fleet Marine Force, Pacific	
3		Ralph J. Mitchell	Major general	21 April 1943	1 February 1944	Navy and Army Distinguished Service Medals; director of Marine Corps Aviation 1939-1943; Distinguished Flying Cross from Nicaraguan Campaign.	
4		James T. Moore	Major general	1 February 1944	15 June 1944	Army Distinguished Service Medals, Legion of Merit; commanded also 4th Marine Aircraft Wing and 2nd Marine Aircraft Wing	
5		Ralph J. Mitchell	Major general	15 June 1944	6 June 1945	Navy and Army Distinguished Service Medals; director of Marine Corps Aviation 1939-1943; Distinguished Flying Cross from Nicaraguan Campaign.	
6		Harold C. Major (Acting)	Colonel	6 June 1945	11 June 1945	Legion of Merit	
7		Lewie G. Merritt	Brigadier general	11 June 1945	11 August 1945	World War I veteran; director, South Carolina Legislative Council; Citadel alumnus; Merritt Field as MCAS Beaufort is named after him	
8		Claude A. Larkin	Major general	11 August 1945	31 October 1945	Lieutenant general; MAG-21 commanding officer at Ewa Field during Pearl Harbor attack	
9		Louis E. Woods	Major general	31 October 1945	July 1946	Veteran Guadalcanal Campaign, veteran Okinawa Campaign, Navy Distinguished Service Medal, Commander of the Most Excellent Order of the British Empire; commanding general, 2nd Marine Aircraft Wing	
10		Lawson H. M. Sanderson	Brigadier general	July 1946	June 1947	Aviation pioneer, veteran Guadalcanal Campaign, as commanding officer of the 4th Marine Aircraft Wing, Sanderson accepted the Japanese surrender of Wake Island in 1945.	
11		William L. McKittrick	Brigadier general	June 1947	September 1947	Veteran Bougainville Campaign and Battle of Saipan; two awards of Legion of Merit, Bronze Star Medal; commanding general, 2nd Marine Aircraft Wing	
12		Louis E. Woods	Major general	September 1947	July 1949	Veteran Guadalcanal Campaign, veteran Okinawa Campaign, Navy Distinguished Service Medal, Commander of the Most Excellent Order of the British Empire; commanding general, 2nd Marine Aircraft Wing	
13		Field Harris	Major general	July 1949	29 May 1951	Graduate U.S. Naval Academy; Lieutenant general; Navy and Army Distinguished Service Medals	
14		Thomas J. Cushman (Acting)	Brigadier general	29 May 1951	27 July 1951	Lieutenant general; commanding general, 4th Marine Base Defense Air Wing (World War II) and 2nd Marine Aircraft Wing	
15		Christian F. Schilt	Major general	27 July 1951	12 April 1952	Medal of Honor; General; Veteran World War I, United States occupation of Haiti, United States occupation of Nicaragua, and World War II	
16		Clayton C. Jerome	Major general	12 April 1952	9 January 1953	Lieutenant general; commanding general, 2nd Marine Aircraft Wing	
17		Vernon E. Megee	Major general	9 January 1953	7 December 1953	Assistant Commandant of the Marine Corps; Veteran World War II and Korean War; commanding general Fleet Marine Force Pacific; Air Force Distinguished Service Medal	
18		Albert D. Cooley	Major general	8 December 1953	25 March 1954	Veteran World War II; commanding general 3rd Marine Aircraft Wing; Navy Cross, Bronze Star Medal and Air Medal	
19		Verne J. McCaul	Major general	26 March 1954	24 August 1954	Assistant Commandant of the Marine Corps; Veteran World War II and Korean War;	
20		Marion L. Dawson	Major general	25 August 1954	24 September 1955	Veteran World War II and Korean War; Graduate of the U.S. Naval Academy;	
21		Samuel S. Jack	Major general	25 September 1955	30 June 1956	Veteran Nicaraguan Campaign, World War II and Korean War; Graduate of the U.S. Naval Academy; Recipient of the Navy Cross	
22		David F. O'Neill	Brigadier general	1 July 1956	27 November 1956	Veteran of World War II and Korean War; Graduate of the U.S. Naval Academy; Recipient of the two Legion of Merit; Bronze Star Medal and three Air Medals	
23		Arthur F. Binney	Major general	27 November 1956	December 1957	Veteran World War II and Korean War; commanding general 2nd Marine Aircraft Wing; graduate U.S. Naval Academy in 1928;	
24		Charles H. Hayes	Brigadier general	December 1957	April 1959	Assistant Commandant of the Marine Corps; Veteran World War II and Korean War; commanding general 3rd Marine Aircraft Wing; graduate U.S. Naval Academy in 1930;	
25		Carson A. Roberts	Major general	April 1959	1 December 1959	Veteran World War II and Korean War; commanding general 3rd Marine Aircraft Wing; Distinguished Flying Cross; Lieutenant general	
26		Richard C. Mangrum	Major general	1 December 1959	April 1960	Assistant Commandant of the Marine Corps; Veteran World War II and Korean War; Navy Cross; commanding general 2nd Marine Aircraft Wing	
27		Avery R. Kier	Brigadier general	April 1960	June 1961	Veteran World War II and Korean War; Navy Cross; commanding general 3rd Marine Aircraft Wing	
28		John P. Condon	Major general	June 1961	August 1962	Veteran World War II and Korean War; commanding general 3rd Marine Aircraft Wing; graduate U.S. Naval Academy in 1934;	
29		Frederick E. Leek	Brigadier general	June 1962	February 1963	Commanding general, 1st Marine Division June–July 1961; Assistance Division Commander, 1st Marine Division 1961-1962	
30		Frank C. Tharin	Major general	June 1963	June 1964	A veteran of Battle of Wake Island;Prisoner of War from December 1941 to September 1945; Navy Distinguished Service Medal; Silver Star, Distinguished Flying Cross; Legion of Merit; Purple Heart	
31		Paul J. Fontana	Major general	June 1964	24 May 1965	Flying ace with 5 aerial victories; Navy Cross; Distinguished Flying Cross	
32		Keith B. McCutcheon	Brigadier general	24 May 1965	16 May 1966	General; Distinguished Flying Cross; Army Silver Star Medal; commanding officer Marine Helicopter Squadron One (HMX-1); commanding general, III Marine Amphibious Force; McCutcheon Field at MCAS New River, North Carolina is named in his honor.	
33		Louis Robertshaw	Major general	16 May 1966	June 1967	Graduate U.S. Naval Academy; captain of the 1935 Naval Academy football team; Inspector General of the Marine Corps	
34		Norman J. Anderson	Major general	June 1967	21 June 1968	Navy Distinguished Service Medal; Distinguished Flying Cross with three gold stars; Air Medal with two silver stars; graduate UCLA	
35		Charles J. Quilter	Major general	21 June 1968	7 July 1969		
36		William G. Thrash	Major general	7 July 1969	2 July 1970	Veteran World War II, Korean War, Vietnam War; Prisoner of War from May 1952 to September 1953; Navy Distinguished Service Medal with one gold star; Distinguished Flying Cross	
37		Alan J. Armstrong	Major general	2 July 1970	April 1971	Navy Distinguished Service Medal; Distinguished Flying Cross with gold star	
38		Robert F. Conley (Acting)	Brigadier general	April 1971	June 1971	Legion of Merit w/ 2 gold stars; Distinguished Flying Cross w/ 3 gold stars; Director of Information	
39		Robert G. Owens Jr.	Major general	June 1971	1 April 1972	Flying ace with 7 victories; Navy Cross; Distinguished Flying Cross w/ 4 gold stars; commanding general, 3rd Marine Aircraft Wing	
40		Leslie E. Brown	Major general	April 1972	1 April 1973	Veteran World War II; Korean War, and Vietnam War; Silver Star with gold star; Legion of Merit with Combat "V" and 2 gold stars; Distinguished Flying Cross; Bronze Star Medal with Combat "V"; Purple Heart with 2 gold stars	
41		Frank C. Lang	Major general	April 1973	May 1974	Veteran World War II; Korean War, and Vietnam War; Legion of Merit with Combat "V" and 2 gold stars; Distinguished Flying Cross with 7 stars	
42		Victor A. Armstrong	Major general	May 1974	January 1975	Major general; Veteran World War II; Korean War, and Vietnam War; Legion of Merit with Combat "V" and 2 gold stars; Distinguished Flying Cross with gold star	
43		Norman W. Gourley	Major general	January 1975	6 January 1976	Major general; Veteran World War II; Korean War, and Vietnam War; Navy Distinguished Service Medal; Legion of Merit with Combat "V" and gold stars Distinguished Flying Cross with three gold stars	
44		William J. White (Acting)	Brigadier general	6 January 1976	23 February 1976	Veteran Korean War, and Vietnam War; Legion of Merit with Combat "V"; Distinguished Flying Cross	
45		Noah C. New	Major general	1976	10 February 1978	Veteran Vietnam War; Legion of Merit with Combat "V"; Distinguished Flying Cross	
46		John K. Davis	Major general	15 February 1978	June 1979	General; Assistant Commandant of the Marine Corps; Navy Distinguished Service Medal; Distinguished Flying Cross; commanding general 3rd Marine Aircraft Wing	
47		William R. Maloney	Major general	June 1979	2 June 1980	Lieutenant general; Silver Star; Navy Distinguished Service Medal; Distinguished Flying Cross; commanding general 3rd Marine Aircraft Wing; commanding general 2nd Marine Aircraft Wing	
48		William H. Fitch	Major general	2 June 1980	2 June 1982	Lieutenant general; Silver Star Medal	
49		Joseph J. Went	Major general	2 June 1982	6 May 1983	Assistant Commandant of the Marine Corps; General; Veteran Vietnam War	
50		Frank E. Petersen Jr.	Major general	6 May 1983	1985	Lieutenant general; Distinguished Flying Cross; Gray Eagle Award; Man of the Year, NAACP, 1979.	
51		Charles H. Pitman	Major general	12 June 1985	9 September 1987	Lieutenant general; Silver Star Medal	
52		Ross S. Plasterer	Major general	9 September 1987	September 1989	Veteran Vietnam War; Legion of Merit; Distinguished Flying Cross	
53		Duane A. Wills	Brigadier general	9 September 1989	August 1990	Lieutenant general; Veteran Vietnam War; Distinguished Flying Cross; lettered in football at UCLA;	
54		Norman E. Ehlert	Major general	6 August 1990	January 1991	Lieutenant general; commanding general, III Marine Expeditionary Force; Defense Distinguished Service Medal; Navy Distinguished Service Medal; Distinguished Flying Cross	
55		Arthur C. Blades	Brigadier general	July 1991	June 1992	Silver Star; Distinguished Flying Cross	
56		William A. Forney	Brigadier general	June 1992	24 June 1994	Veteran Vietnam War; Legion of Merit	
57		George M. Karamarkovich	Brigadier general	24 June 1994	May 1996	Veteran Vietnam War; Defense Superior Service Medal	
58		Bruce B. Knutson, Jr.	Major general	May 1996	April 1998	Lieutenant general	
59		Joseph T. Anderson	Major general	April 1998	2000	Veteran Vietnam War; graduate U.S. Naval Academy; Deputy Director, Smithsonian National Air and Space Museum	
60		James E. Cartwright	Major general	2000	5 August 2002	General; Vice Chairman of the Joint Chiefs of Staff; commander, U.S. Strategic Command	
61		John F. Goodman	Major general	5 August 2002	3 June 2004	Lieutenant general; Defense Distinguished Service Medal; Soldiers Medal; Veteran Vietnam War; commander, United States Marine Corps Forces Pacific; director, Center for Excellence in Disaster Management and Humanitarian Assistance; former NFL quarterback	
62		Duane D. Thiessen	Major general	3 June 2004	10 June 2005		
63		George J. Trautman, III	Major general	10 June 2005	8 June 2007		
64		Robert E. Schmidle, Jr.	Brigadier general	8 June 2007	28 July 2008		
65		Raymond C. Fox	Brigadier general	28 July 2008	28 June 2010		
66		William D. Beydler	Brigadier general	28 June 2010	22 June 2012		
67		Christopher S. Owens	Brigadier general	22 June 2012	9 July 2013		
68		Steven R. Rudder	Brigadier general	9 July 2013	30 July 2015		
69		Russell A. Sanborn	Major general	30 July 2015	29 June 2017		
70		Thomas D. Weidley	Brigadier general	29 June 2017	25 June 2019	Commanding during the loss of 6 Marines in a mid-air collision between an F/A-18D Hornet and a KC-130J Hercules. Formally rebuked after allowing the investigative officer Colonel Samuel Schoolfield to run an unprofessional JAGMAN investigation into the crash.	
71		Christopher A. McPhillips	Brigadier general	25 June 2019	11 June 2021		
72		Brian W. Cavanaugh	Major general	11 June 2021	12 August 2022		
73		Eric E. Austin	Major general	12 August 2022	12 July 2024		
74		Marcus B. Annibale	Major general	12 July 2024	23 March 2026		
75		Simon M. Doran	Brigadier general	23 March 2026	Incumbent		

== See also ==
- List of Historically Important U.S. Marines
- List of United States Marine Corps aircraft wings
- List of active United States Marine Corps aircraft squadrons
- List of 1st Marine Division Commanders
- List of 2nd Marine Division Commanders
- List of 3rd Marine Division Commanders
