= James T. Moore (USMC) =

United States Marine Corps general

James Tillinghast Moore
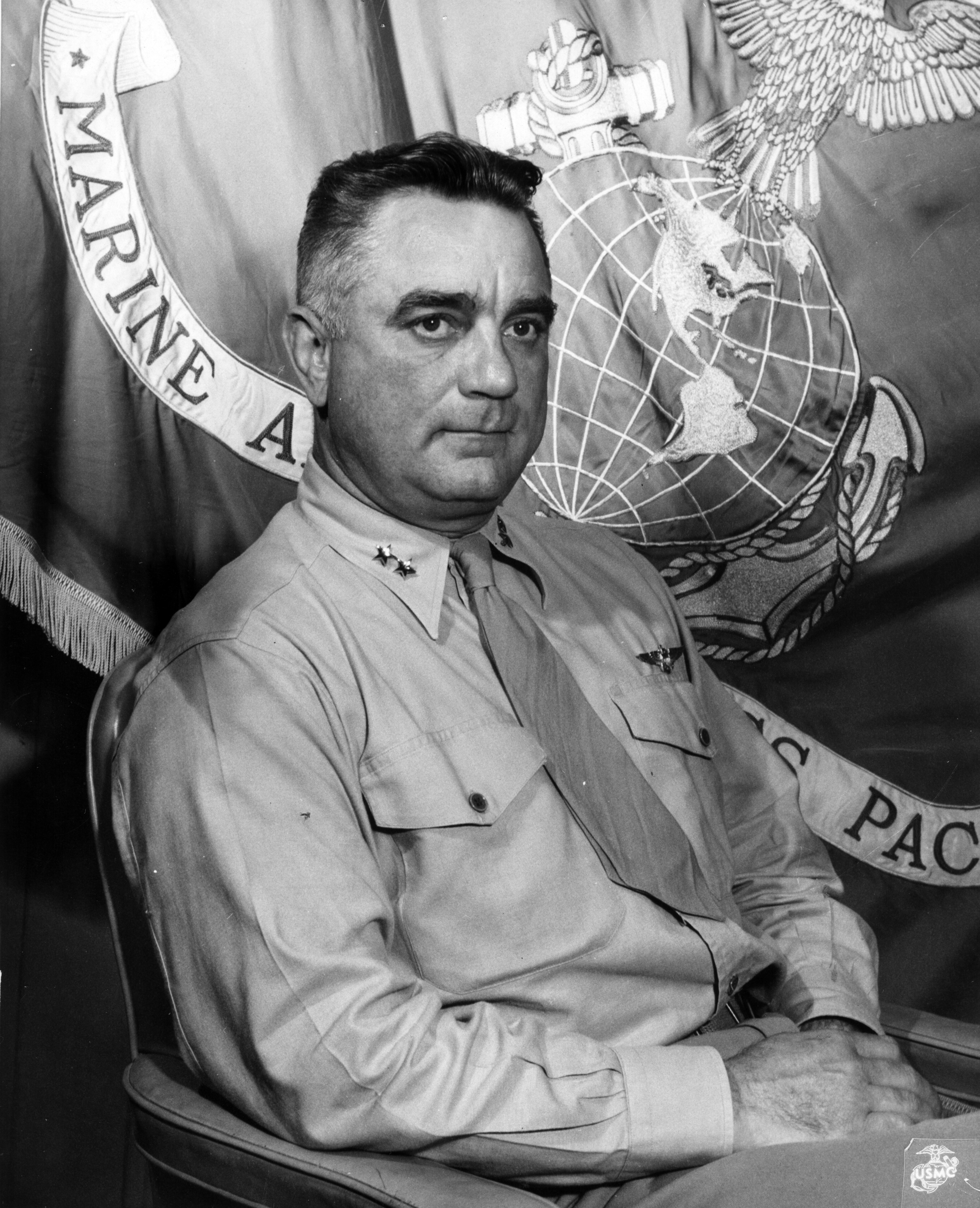
- Major General James T. Moore, USMC
- Born: September 5, 1895; Barnwell, South Carolina, US
- Died: November 10, 1953 (aged 58); Columbia, South Carolina, US
- Burial place: Barnwell Baptist Church Cemetery
- Relatives: BG William W. Moore (Father)
- Military career
- Allegiance: United States of America
- Branch: United States Marine Corps
- Service years: 1916–1946
- Rank: Lieutenant general
- Service number: 0-685
- Commands: 1st Marine Aircraft Wing; 4th Marine Aircraft Wing; 2nd Marine Aircraft Wing
- Conflicts: Banana Wars: Dominican Campaign; Haitian Campaign; World War I Yangtze Patrol; World War II: Solomon Islands campaign; Bismarck Archipelago Campaign; Mariana and Palau Islands campaign
- Awards: Army Distinguished Service Medal; Legion of Merit

Lieutenant General James Tillinghast Moore (September 5, 1895 – November 10, 1953) was a decorated Officer and aviator in the United States Marine Corps, he is most noted for his service as commanding general of the 2nd Marine Aircraft Wing during World War II.

== Early career ==
Moore was born on September 5, 1895, in Barnwell, South Carolina, as a son of Army Brigadier General William Woodbury Moore, who served as Adjutant General of the South Carolina National Guard. He later attended The Citadel as his father did and graduated on October 28, 1916. Moore was commissioned a 2d Lieutenant in the Marine Corps on the same date. Moore was subsequently sent to Marine Officer's School within Marine Barracks at Norfolk Navy Yard, Virginia and after graduation assigned as Infantryman to the 2nd Provisional Brigade of Marines. He was sent for occupation duties to Santo Domingo at the beginning of December 1916 and served there until April 1919 as a company commander with 4th Marine Regiment. Young Moore was promoted to the rank of 1st Lieutenant on May 22, 1917, and distinguished himself during his service there and was later decorated with Order of Military Merit by the Government of Dominican Republic. He was also promoted to the rank of Captain on October 28, 1918.

== Aviation service during Interwar period ==
Moore returned to the United States in April 1919 and was assigned to the Marine barracks at Philadelphia Navy Yard. He was transferred to the Hingham Naval Ammunition Depot, Massachusetts in December 1920. After one year service there, Moore requested for transfer to Marine Corps aviation, which was granted. He was appointed student aviator and sent for flight training to Naval Air Station Pensacola, Florida in July 1920. Moore completed his training and was designated Naval aviator on July 1, 1922.

He was subsequently assigned to the Marine Barracks Quantico, Virginia, where he stayed only until August and then reported for duties with First Brigade of Marines. Moore sailed with this unit for Haiti and served there as Pilot until September 1924, when he returned to the United States. Moore was assigned back to the Quantico base, where he remained until March 1925, when he was transferred to Naval Air Station Pensacola, Florida, where he was appointed assistant to Chief of Naval Aviation Training. In June 1925, Moore was sent to Kelly Field in Texas, where he attended three months course at Advanced Flying School.

His next assignments was again at Marine Barracks Quantico, where he stayed until March 1927, when he left for China during Yangtze Patrol. Moore served there as executive officer of observations aircraft squadrons within Third Marine Brigade under the command of Brigadier General Smedley D. Butler. While stationed in Tianjin, General Butler arranged a special review on the occasion of Marine Corps Birthday on November 10, 1927. During the exhibition of stunt flyers, Moore flew his plane very low just over the crowd of spectators and tried to make a climbing roll. His plane lost both of its wings and became uncontrollable. Moore bailed out of the plane by the parachute and landed in the front of the crowd of spectators. Most of them were unaware about the accident, thought it was the best show they had ever seen. Moore was transferred to the Naval Station Guam in September 1928 and served there until July 1929, before he was ordered to the States.

In August 1929, Moore was appointed a student at the Air Corps Tactical School at Langley Field, Virginia, and upon graduation, he was assigned for another studies at Field Officers Course within Marine Corps Schools. He was subsequently appointed Executive Officer of the aircraft squadrons, East Coast Expeditionary Force based at Quantico and also promoted to the rank of Major on May 20, 1931. At the beginning of May 1932, Moore was assigned to the 1st Brigade of Marines and sent back to Haiti, now as squadron commander and later as commanding officer of the Bowen Field in Port-au-Prince. For his service in Haiti, Moore was decorated with Haitian National Order of Honour and Merit by the Government of Haiti. He returned to the United States in August 1934.

Moore spent one year at his well-known Quantico Base, was promoted to the rank of lieutenant colonel on June 30, 1935, and subsequently transferred to Virgin Islands, where he served as squadron commander at the Marine Corps Air Station at St. Thomas. He returned to the States in April 1937 and was assigned as a student to Senior Course at Naval War College in Newport, Rhode Island, in June 1937. Graduating following year, Moore was appointed executive officer of the Marine Aircraft Group 1 at Quantico and transferred to the Marine Corps Base San Diego in July 1939. Here he became force air officer within Fleet Marine Force.

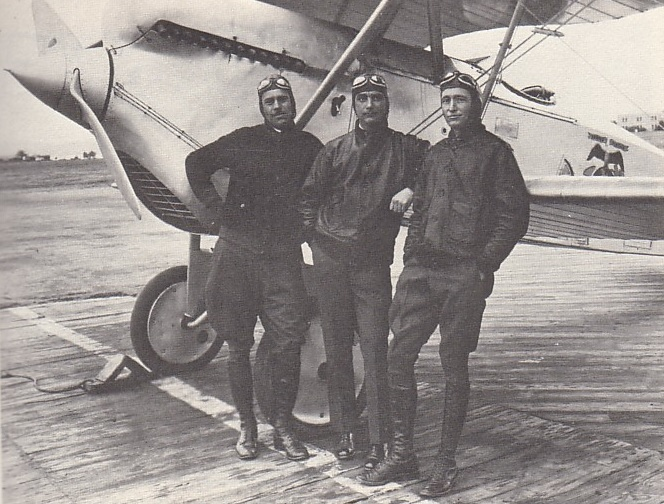
Three future Marine Corps Generals: 1st Lt. Christian F. Schilt, Capt. James T. Moore and William L. McKittrick during theirs interwar service.

== World War II ==
Moore was promoted to the rank of colonel on October 1, 1940, and appointed a Chief of U.S. Aviation Mission to Peru. He served as main advisor to the Peruvian president, Manuel Prado Ugarteche, and the president also appointed him to the capacity of commanding general of the Peruvian Air Force. While serving there, Moore was promoted to the rank of brigadier general on September 1, 1942. For his service in this capacity, he was decorated with La Orden El Sol del Peru, rank Commander and Peruvian Aviation Cross, 1st Class by President Ugarteche. General Moore was succeeded by Brigadier General Ford O. Rogers in October 1942 and returned to the United States.

After his arrival, he was appointed commanding general of the 4th Marine Aircraft Wing deployed at Hawaii and later in Pacific Theater. Moore was relieved by Brigadier General Harold D. Campbell in April 1943 and transferred to the staff of 1st Marine Aircraft Wing under the command of Major General Ralph J. Mitchell, where he was appointed chief of staff. He served simultaneously as chief of staff for Marine Air South Pacific also under General Mitchell's command.

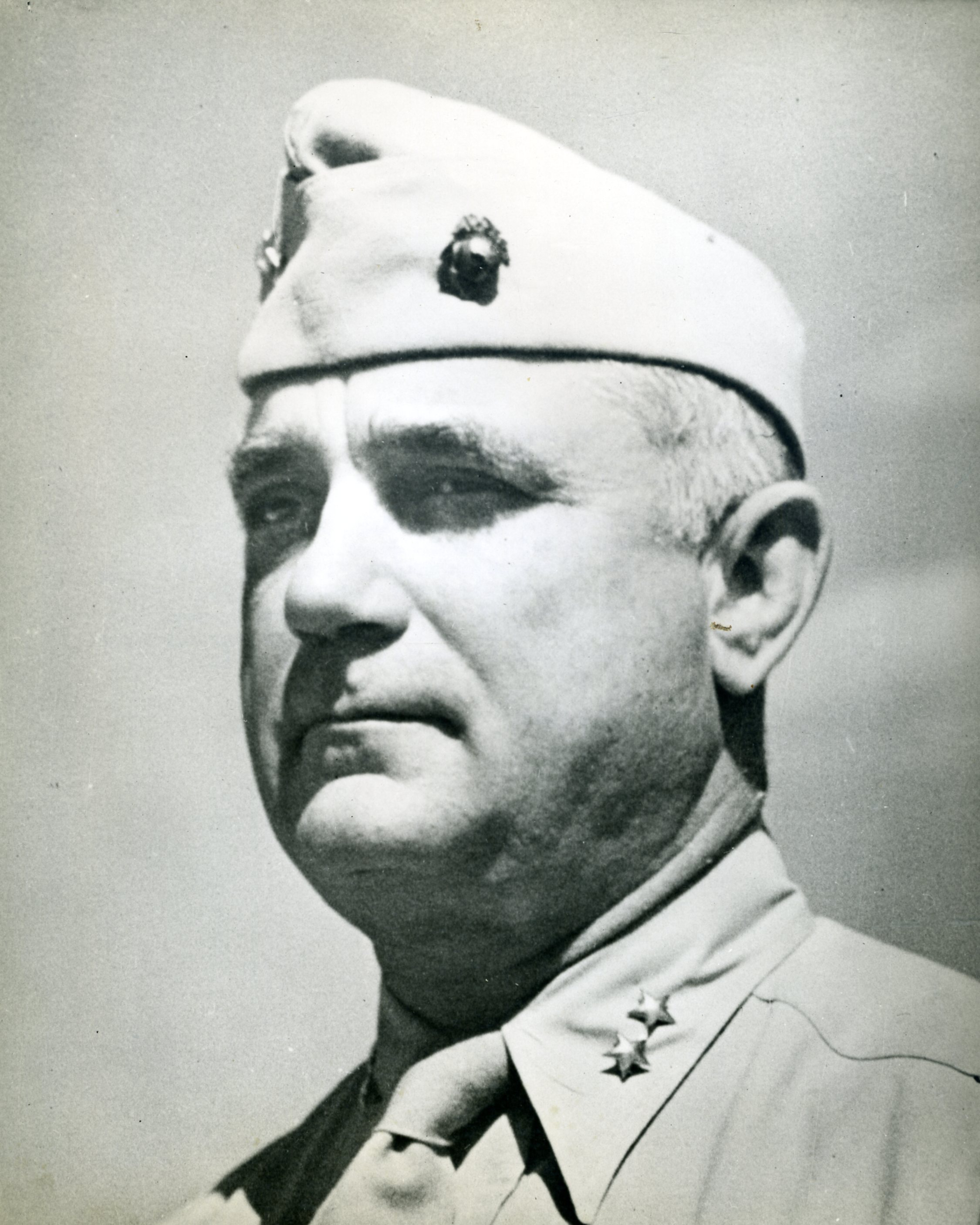
Major General James T. Moore on March 24, 1945

General Moore was later appointed deputy commander of 1st Marine Aircraft Wing, where he was the immediate superior of Pappy Boyington, who commanded the "Black Sheep" of VMF-214; in February 1944 he was elevated to commanding general, when he succeeded Major General Mitchell. For his efforts during the Bismarck Archipelago Campaign, when he successfully neutralized enemy air power in the region, he was decorated with the Legion of Merit. Moore was relieved from command by Brigadier General Lewie G. Merritt in July 1944 and subsequently became commanding general of 2nd Marine Aircraft Wing. His last service assignment came in February 1945, when he was appointed commanding general of aircraft, Fleet Marine Force, Pacific, the position, which he held for the rest of the war. For his service as commanding general of 2nd MAW and CG Aircraft FMF, Pacific, he was decorated with Army Distinguished Service Medal.

=== Army Distinguished Service Medal citation ===
Action Date: July 7, 1944 – February 23, 1945
Name: James T. Moore
Service: United States Marine Corps
Rank: Major General
Division: 2d Marine Aircraft Wing
Citation: The President of the United States of America, authorized by Act of Congress July 9, 1918, takes pleasure in presenting the Army Distinguished Service Medal to Major General James T. Moore (MCSN: 0-685), United States Marine Corps, for exceptionally meritorious service to the Government of the United States in a position of great responsibility as Commander, Garrison Air Force, Western Caroline Islands, and concurrently as Commanding General, SECOND Marine Aircraft Wing, from 7 July 1944 to 23 February 1945, and as Commander Aircraft, Fleet Marine Force, Pacific, from 24 February to 2 September 1945. Operating boldly and with sharp military acumen from his headquarters in the midst of hostilities on Peleliu, Major General Moore discharged the heavy responsibilities of two distinct command assignments. Consistently demonstrating his comprehensive knowledge of aerial tactics, he directed all Army, Navy and Marine Air Units supporting the operation against enemy Japanese forces in the Southern Palau Islands and, skillfully coordinating the efforts of air and ground forces, effected an early consolidation of the area into a strong air defensive command from which he shrewdly exploited the weaknesses of the enemy, stabbed at his vulnerable positions and blasted his fortified strong points to hasten the ultimate success of our offensive in the Western Carolines and establish a principal air gateway to the Philippines. As Commander Aircraft, Fleet Marine Force, Pacific, Major General Moore hurled the full fighting strength of his air forces over widespread areas of the Pacific, slashing Japanese supply lines, sinking enemy warships, driving hostile aircraft from the sky and dealing death and destruction to the enemy at every opportunity as his intrepid airmen staunchly supported offensive operations which opened the way by sea and by air to the homeland of the Japanese. By his dynamic leadership, personal valor and outstanding skill in resolving multiple complex problems of logistics, material, tactics and personnel, Major General Moore contributed essentially to the successful prosecution of the war. The achievement of the Fleet Marine Air Force under his brilliant direction reflects the highest credit upon himself, his gallant command and the United States Naval Service.

== Later life ==
General Moore retired from the Marine Corps on November 1, 1946, and lived together with his wife Fannie Helner Moore in Columbia, South Carolina, where he died on November 10, 1953. He is buried at Barnwell Baptist Church Cemetery in his birthplace Barnwell, South Carolina.

== In popular culture ==
Moore was portrayted by actor Simon Oakland in the TV series Baa Baa Black Sheep which ran on NBC from 1976 to 1978, it was based on the experiences of United States Marine Corps aviator and Medal of Honor recipient, Colonel Gregory "Pappy" Boyington, USMC.

== Decorations ==
Here is the ribbon bar of Lieutenant General James T. Moore:

Naval Aviator Badge
1st Row	Army Distinguished Service Medal		Legion of Merit	
2nd Row	Dominican Campaign Medal	Marine Corps Expeditionary Medal with two stars	World War I Victory Medal with West Indies clasp	Yangtze Service Medal
3rd Row	American Defense Service Medal with Foreign Service Clasp	American Campaign Medal	Asiatic-Pacific Campaign Medal with three service stars	World War II Victory Medal
4th Row	Order of Military Merit (Dominican Republic)	Haitian National Order of Honour and Merit	Commander of the La Orden El Sol del Peru	Peruvian Aviation Cross, 1st Class

== See also ==
- List of 1st Marine Aircraft Wing commanders

Military offices
Preceded by Ralph J. Mitchell	Commanding General of the 1st Marine Aircraft Wing; February 1, 1944 – June 15, 1944	Succeeded by Ralph J. Mitchell
