= Ralph J. Mitchell =

United States Marine Corps general

Ralph Johnson Mitchell
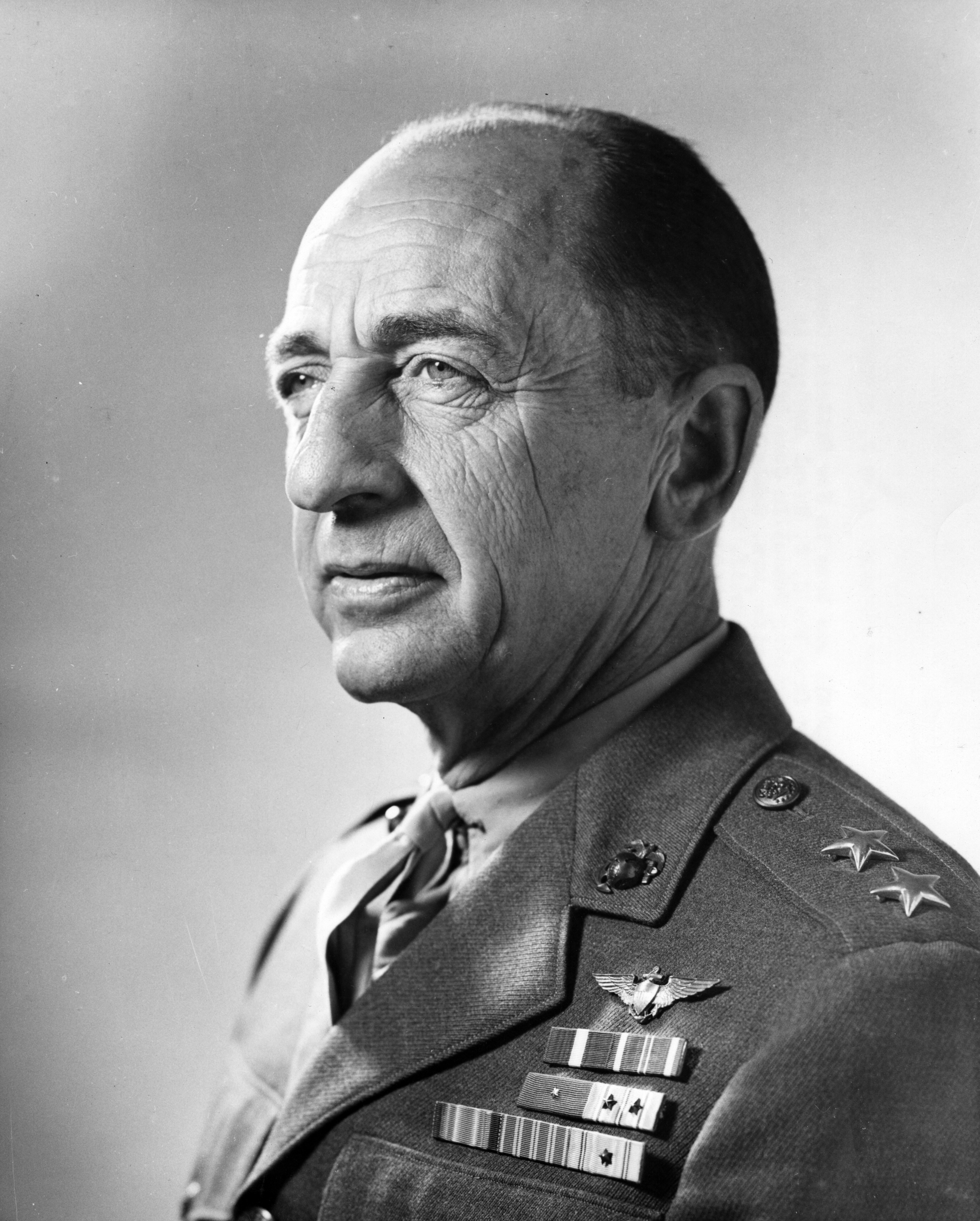
- Mitchell as Major General, USMC
- Born: September 25, 1891; New Britain, Connecticut, U.S.
- Died: May 31, 1971 (aged 79); San Diego, California, U.S.
- Burial place: Scattered at sea
- Military career
- Allegiance: United States
- Branch: United States Marine Corps
- Service years: 1915–1948
- Rank: Lieutenant General
- Service number: 0-673
- Commands: 1st Marine Aircraft Wing; Director of Marine Corps Aviation; MCAS Cherry Point; 9th Marine Aircraft Wing; 2nd Marine Aircraft Wing
- Conflicts: World War I Banana Wars: Nicaraguan Campaign; World War II: Solomon Islands campaign; Bombing of Rabaul; Bougainville Campaign; Philippines Campaign
- Awards: Navy Distinguished Service Medal; Army Distinguished Service Medal; Legion of Merit (2); Distinguished Flying Cross; Air Medal (2)

Ralph Johnson Mitchell (September 25, 1891 – May 31, 1970) was a decorated aviation officer of the United States. He is most noted for his service as Director of Aviation during the years 1939–1943 and commanding officer of the 1st Marine Aircraft Wing during World War II.

== Early years ==
Ralph J. Mitchell was born on September 25, 1891, in New Britain, Connecticut. He attended the United States Naval Academy in Annapolis, Maryland, and graduated on June 5, 1915, with a bachelor's degree. During his time at the academy, he captained the lacrosse team, was active in football and also served as associate editor of the midshipman magazine, The Log.

Mitchell was commissioned second lieutenant in the Marine Corps the day he graduated from the academy. He served first as a ground officer in the States and at Guam and after World War I, he was assigned to the flight training. He completed the training and was designated a naval aviator in the Marine Corps in June 1921.

His first aviation assignment was with Naval Air Station Guam, where he stayed until 1923, when he was assigned to the aviation section of the Headquarters Marine Corps in Washington, D.C. Later he attended Army Air Service Tactical School at Langley Field, Virginia. He also attended Command and General Staff College at Fort Leavenworth, Kansas. After graduation, Mitchell was appointed Aircraft Squadron Commander within West Coast Expeditionary Force stationed at Naval Air Station San Diego, California.

In December 1929, Major Mitchell was appointed Commander of Squadron attached to the Second Marine Brigade, which was sent to Nicaragua to suppress the Sandino Rebellion. On June 19, 1930, Major Mitchell led a six-plane patrol, which encountered and attacked a large enemy unit of Sandinistas bandits near the town of Jinotega. The squadron under Mitchell's command inflicted heavy casualties on Sandinitas bandits and forced them to retreat. For his extraordinary ability and excellent judgment, Major Mitchell was awarded with the Distinguished Flying Cross. He was also decorated with the Presidential Order of Merit with Gold star by the Government of Nicaragua.

After his return to the United States, Mitchell was appointed Aircraft Squadron Commander within East Coast Expeditionary Force stationed in Quantico, Virginia. He also attended the Naval War College in Newport, Rhode Island, in June 1932 and subsequently was transferred to the Headquarters Marine Corps, where he served in Commandant's Department.

In 1935, Mitchell participated in fleet exercises aboard the USS Lexington and USS Ranger and was involved in the developing of carrier aircraft operations.

Lieutenant Colonel Mitchell was listed as the technical advisor in the opening credits of the 1935 movie Devil Dogs of the Air which starred James Cagney and Pat O'Brien.

== World War II ==
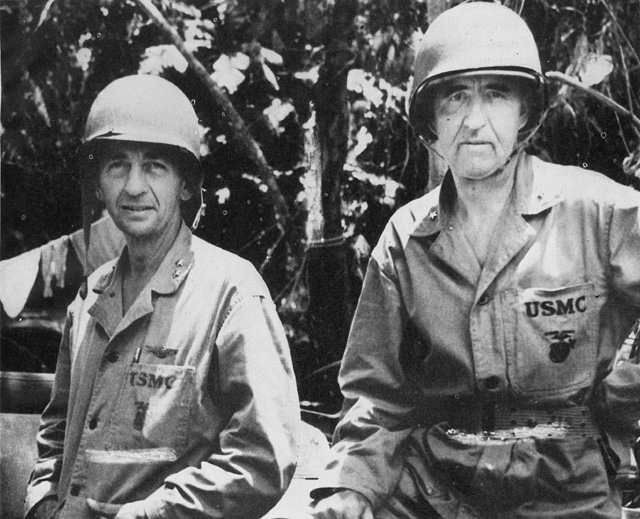
Major General Ralph J. Mitchell and Brigadier General Field Harris at Torokina Airfield during air operations within Bougainville Campaign.

Mitchell was promoted to the rank of brigadier general on March 11, 1939, and was appointed director of aviation within Headquarters Marine Corps. In this capacity, he was responsible for the organization of the Marine Air arm for the Pacific Campaign. He was later awarded with the Legion of Merit for his service in this capacity.

Mitchell was subsequently transferred to the Pacific, where he relieved Major General Roy S. Geiger from command of the 1st Marine Aircraft Wing on April 21, 1943. He was promoted to the rank of major general on the same date. He was also Commander Marine Aircraft, South Pacific. Mitchell commanded these units during initial stage of the Rabaul operation and subsequently planned and coordinated air strikes against Japanese fortifications at Rabaul. In the upcoming Bougainville Campaign, Mitchell successfully attacked the supply lines of enemy cargo ships. For his tireless effort Mitchell was decorated with the second Legion of Merit and Navy Distinguished Service Medal.

He continued to command 1st Marine Aircraft Wing and was also appointed Commander of Aircraft at Northern Solomons. He distinguished himself in neutralizing of enemy bases in the Northern Solomons, New Britain and New Ireland and was decorated with the Army Distinguished Service Medal.

Mitchell later participated in the Philippines Campaign and served in the Pacific Theater until June 5, 1945. During his World War II service, he was also decorated with two Air Medals. In recognition of his command of New Zealand aviation units in the Northern Solomons, Mitchell was made an Honorary Companion of Most Honourable Military Order of the Bath by the United Kingdom.

== Postwar life ==
He returned to the United States in August 1945 and was appointed commander of the Marine Corps Air Station Cherry Point, North Carolina. In this capacity, he was simultaneously a Commander of the 9th Marine Aircraft Wing and later 2nd Marine Aircraft Wing, stationed there.

During the summer of 1947, Mitchell was transferred to Hawaii, where he was appointed Commander of Aircraft, Fleet Marine Force, Pacific. He returned to the United States in early 1948, awaiting retirement.

General Mitchell retired from the Marine Corps in May 1948 and was advanced to the rank of lieutenant general on the retired list for having been specially commended in combat. Lieutenant General Ralph J. Mitchell lived in Coronado, California in retirement and died on May 31, 1970, in Naval Medical Center San Diego, California. He was survived by his widow, Belle Thompson Mitchell, their son, Ralph J. Mitchell Jr., Lieutenant Commander, USNR, and six grandchildren.

== Decorations ==
Here is the ribbon bar of Lieutenant General Ralph J. Mitchell:

Naval Aviator Badge
1st Row	Navy Distinguished Service Medal		Army Distinguished Service Medal	
2nd Row	Legion of Merit with Gold Star	Distinguished Flying Cross	Air Medal with Gold Star	World War I Victory Medal
3rd Row	Second Nicaraguan Campaign Medal	American Defense Service Medal with Base Clasp	American Campaign Medal	Asiatic-Pacific Campaign Medal with three service stars
4th Row	World War II Victory Medal	Philippine Liberation Medal with two stars	Nicaraguan Presidential Order of Merit with Gold star	Companion of Most Honourable Military Order of the Bath

== Citations ==
=== Navy Distinguished Service Medal citation ===
The President of the United States of America takes pleasure in presenting the Navy Distinguished Service Medal to Major General Ralph Johnson Mitchell (MCSN: 0-673), United States Marine Corps, for exceptionally meritorious service to the Government of the United States in a duty of great responsibility while in Command of Aircraft, Solomon Islands, 20 November 1943 to 15 March 1944. Skillfully planning and executing the coordinated air strikes in crushing, offensive blows against the Japanese stronghold of Rabaul, New Britain Islands, Major General Mitchell reduced and finally eliminated effective enemy air opposition in that area, crippling hostile shipping to such an extent that the value of Rabaul as a supply port became negligible. His intrepid airmen neutralized enemy air facilities on Bougainville and harassed shipping and barge traffic in the Bougainville-Buka-Choiseul Area, seriously disrupting lines of supply to the entrapped Japanese. During the seizure of Green Island his forces gained complete mastery of the air, thus assisting our troops in occupying this island with a minimum of resistance. As a result of Major General Mitchell's inspiring leadership and tireless devotion to duty, Allied surface ships operated unopposed and bombers carried out unescorted missions throughout the entire South Pacific Area. His indomitable fighting spirit was in keeping with the highest traditions of the United States Naval Service.

=== Army Distinguished Service Medal citation ===
The President of the United States of America, authorized by Act of Congress July 9, 1918, takes pleasure in presenting the Army Distinguished Service Medal to Major General Ralph Johnson Mitchell (MCSN: 0-673), United States Marine Corps, for exceptionally meritorious and distinguished service from November 1944 to May 1945 in the highly responsible position of Commander, Aircraft Northern Solomons, Allied Air Forces. He welded together air organizations of the United States, Australia and New Zealand, overcoming their many differences in training, organization and equipment to produce a coordinated, devastating striking force which neutralized enemy bases in the Northern Solomons, New Britain and New Ireland. Despite the ever-changing composition of his command and difficult logistical problems, he maintained high morale and effectiveness, and accomplished smooth transitions without breaking the continuity of operations. By his outstanding leadership and superior organizing and administrative ability, General Mitchell made a significant contribution to the success of Allied Air offensives in the Southwest Pacific Area.

=== Distinguished Flying Cross citation ===
The President of the United States of America takes pleasure in presenting the Distinguished Flying Cross to Major Ralph Johnson Mitchell (MCSN: 0-673), United States Marine Corps, for distinguished service while participating in an aerial flight as an aviator attacked to the Second Brigade USMC, operating in the Republic of Nicaragua. On the afternoon of 19 June 1930, Major Mitchell, while a pilot and in command of a six-plane patrol, encountered and attacked a large hostile force of bandits, under Sandino, a few miles north of Jinotoga, Nicaragua. Although on this day weather conditions were far from being ideal and in the face of a very hostile ground fire, Major Mitchell, with courage, skill and great personal risk, flying at a low altitude and over high mountains and perilous jungles, where a forced landing, even if accomplished, meant almost certain death at the hands of the bandits, led and maneuvered his patrol in such an efficient manner as to bring a concentrated attack for one hour and twenty minutes with machine guns and bombs upon the bandits, pinning them to the ground, inflicting many casualties upon the bandits and causing their rout under cover of darkness. As commander of the Aircraft Squadrons in Nicaragua and leader of the flight just cited, Major Mitchell displayed extraordinary ability, excellent judgment and inspired the greatest confidence in the officers and enlisted men under his command. His actions are considered to be deserving of the highest praise.

== See also ==
- List of 1st Marine Aircraft Wing commanders

Military offices
Preceded by Ross E. Rowell	Director of Aviation; March 11, 1939 – March 29, 1943	Succeeded by Roy S. Geiger
Preceded by Roy S. Geiger	Commanding General of the 1st Marine Aircraft Wing; April 21, 1943 – February 1, 1944; First term	Succeeded by James T. Moore
Preceded by James T. Moore	Commanding General of the 1st Marine Aircraft Wing; June 15, 1944 – June 6, 1945; Second term	Succeeded by Harold C. Major
