= MADC =

MADC may refer to:

- Maharashtra Airport Development Company, India
- Marine Air Defense Command 1, Japan
- Museum of Contemporary Art and Design (Spanish: Museo de Arte y Diseño Contemporáneo), Costa Rica

== See also ==
- MadC, German graffiti artist
