= Harold D. Campbell =

U.S. Marine Corps Major General

Harold Denny Campbell
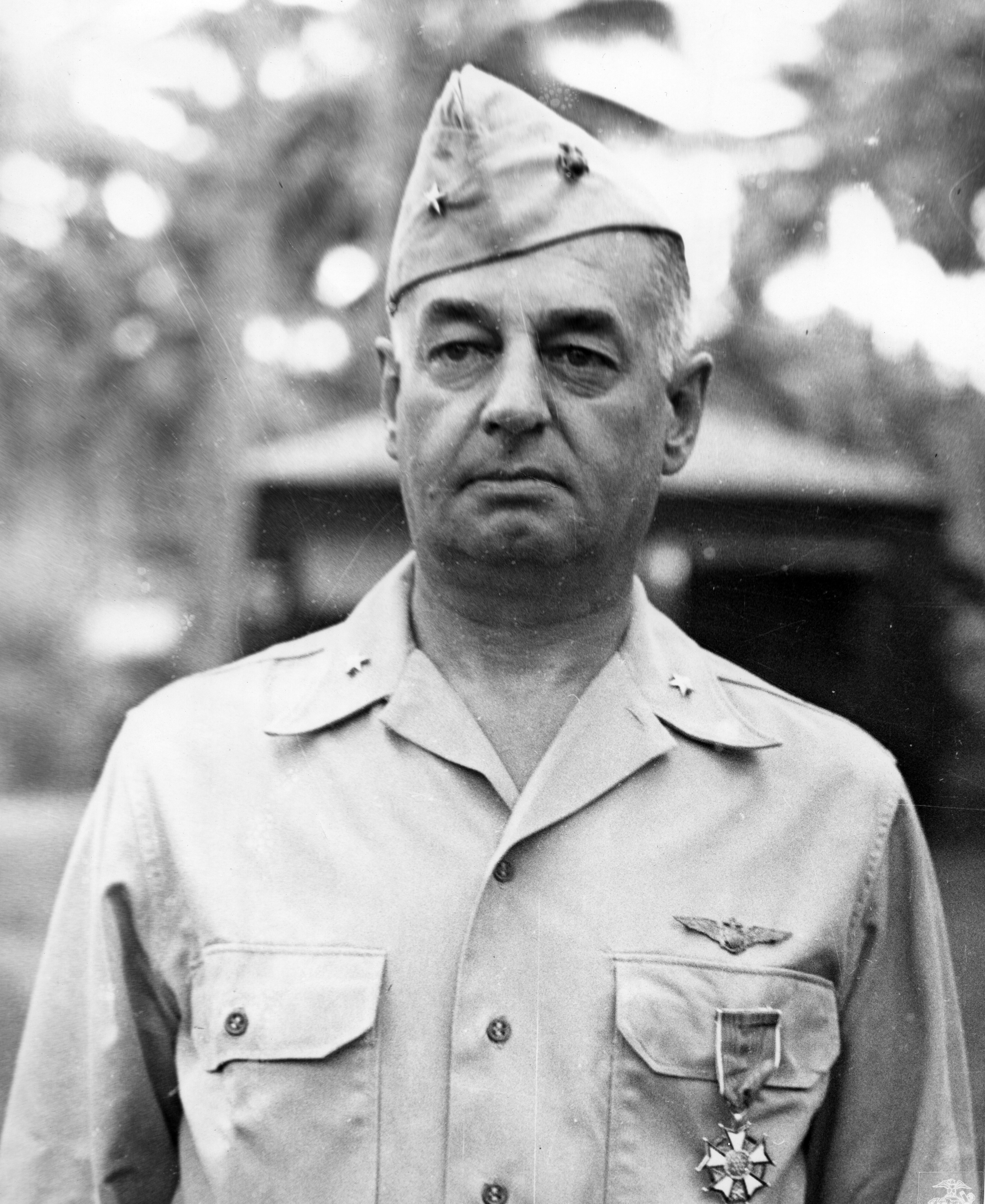
- Campbell as Brigadier general, USMC
- Born: March 30, 1895; Middlesex, Vermont, U.S.
- Died: December 29, 1955 (aged 60); Springfield, Massachusetts, U.S.
- Burial place: Arlington National Cemetery
- Military career
- Allegiance: United States of America
- Branch: United States Marine Corps
- Service years: 1916–1947
- Rank: Major General
- Service number: 0-147
- Commands: 2nd Marine Aircraft Wing; 4th Marine Aircraft Wing; 9th Marine Aircraft Wing; Marine Aircraft Group 11
- Conflicts: Pancho Villa Expedition; World War I: Battle of Belleau Wood; Battle of Saint-Mihiel; Battle of Blanc Mont Ridge; Meuse-Argonne Offensive; Dominican Campaign; Nicaraguan Campaign; Haitian Campaign; World War II
- Awards: Legion of Merit; Navy and Marine Corps Medal; Purple Heart Medal

Harold Denny Campbell (March 30, 1895 – December 29, 1955) was a United States Marine Corps major general who served in World War I and World War II. He is most noted for his service as an aviation officer who commanded the 2nd Marine Aircraft Wing in the Pacific theater and on the staff of Lord Mountbatten during World War II.

== Early life ==
Harold Denny Campbell was born on March 30, 1895, in Middlesex, Vermont and raised in Waterbury, Vermont, as the son of E. E. Campbell, real estate and insurance dealer. He attended Waterbury High School and subsequently Norwich University in Northfield, Vermont, where he graduated in May 1917 with degree in civil engineering. During his studies at Norwich University, Campbell joined Vermont National Guard in 1916 and was stationed at Fort Ethan Allen, before he was sent to participate as Cavalryman in Pancho Villa Expedition.

Following his graduation from Norwich, Campbell joined almost immediately the Marine Corps on May 19, 1917, and was assigned to the 23rd Company, 2nd Battalion, 5th Marine Regiment. He was commissioned a second lieutenant in the Marine Corps Reserve on the same date and appointed platoon leader. Campbell sailed for France on July 27, 1917, and later attended Lewis gun course at Machine gun school. His unit together with 15th Company were subsequently transferred to the 6th Machine Gun Battalion.

Campbell was promoted to the rank of first lieutenant on December 17, 1917, and later participated in all major engagements of Marine Corps in World War I. He was wounded by enemy machine gun fire to his hand during Meuse-Argonne Offensive on the beginning of November 1918 and later was decorated with Purple Heart Medal for these wounds. After his recovery, Campbell served with occupation forces in Germany until June 1919.

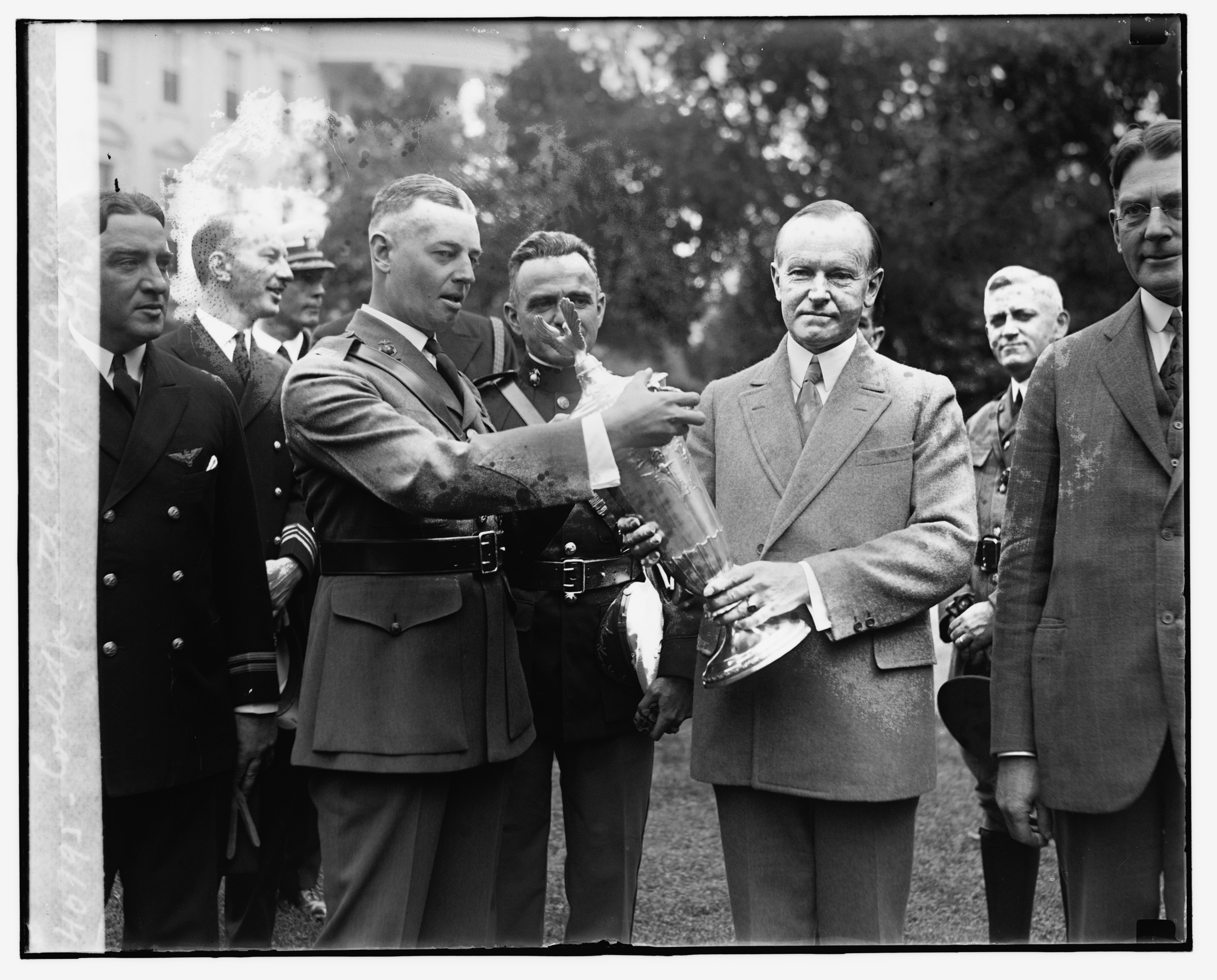
Campbell receiving the Schiff Trophy from President Calvin Coolidge in 1926.

After returning to the United States, Campbell attended flight school and became a naval aviator in 1921. In 1926, he was awarded the Schiff Trophy for completing nearly 900 safe flying hours while based in San Diego. While serving in Nicaragua in 1927, Campbell earned the Navy and Marine Corps Medal. He graduated from the Air Corps Tactical School in 1929. Campbell also served in Guam and Cuba.

== World War II ==
On 6 December 1941, only one day before the Japanese Attack on Pearl Harbor, Campbell was appointed commanding officer of the Marine Aircraft Group 11 stationed at Brown Field within Quantico Base. He served in this capacity until 25 May 1942, when he was personally selected by Chief of Combined Operations, Lord Mountbatten. Campbell was assigned to this staff as Marine Corps Aviation Officer and his main responsibility was to advise in the matter of Air Cover for Commando operations. He participated in the planning of Dieppe Operation. Campbell served in this capacity until April 26, 1943. For his service in England, he was promoted to the rank of brigadier general and decorated with the Legion of Merit.

Campbell arrived to the United States in June 1943 and reported at Headquarters Marine Corps. He has been subsequently transferred to Samoa in August 1943 and took command of 4th Marine Aircraft Wing stationed there. The 4th Marine Wing served as Aircraft Defense Force, Samoan Area, a part of Defense Forces, Samoan Group under Major General Charles F. B. Price. Campbell remained in this capacity until July 1944, when he was appointed commanding general of the 2nd Marine Aircraft Wing.

Following the Battle of Peleliu, Campbell served simultaneously as Peleliu Island Commander. He was succeeded by Brigadier General Christian F. Schilt in March 1945 and returned to the United States. Campbell was appointed commanding general of the 9th Marine Aircraft Wing and Marine Corps Air Station Cherry Point. He served in this capacity until his retirement in November 1947. Campbell was advanced to the rank of major general on the retired list for having been specially commended in combat.

== Later life ==
After his retirement from the Marine Corps, Campbell worked as school teacher and later also as principal at Waterbury High School. Major General Harold D. Campbell died on December 29, 1955, in Wesson Memorial Hospital, Springfield, Massachusetts. He is buried at Arlington National Cemetery, Virginia, together with his wife Mildred Shattuck Campbell (1898–1947). They had together two children: daughter Nancy Jean Campbell (1929–1931) and son Harold Denny Campbell III, who also graduated from Norwich University in 1951.

== Military awards ==
Campbell's decorations and awards include:

Naval Aviator Badge
1st Row	Legion of Merit			
2nd Row	Navy and Marine Corps Medal	Purple Heart Medal	Mexican Service Medal	Marine Corps Expeditionary Medal with one 3/16" bronze star
3rd Row	World War I Victory Medal with five Battle clasps (3/16" bronze stars)	Army of Occupation of Germany Medal	Second Nicaraguan Campaign Medal	American Defense Service Medal
4th Row	American Campaign Medal	Asiatic-Pacific Campaign Medal with two 3/16" bronze stars	European–African–Middle Eastern Campaign Medal	World War II Victory Medal

=== Legion of Merit citation ===
Action Date: June 16, 1942 – April 26, 1943
Name: Harold D. Campbell
Service: United States Marine Corps
Rank: Brigadier General
Citation: The President of the United States of America, authorized by Act of Congress July 9, 1918, takes pleasure in presenting the Legion of Merit to Brigadier General Harold D. Campbell (MCSN: 0-147), United States Marine Corps, for exceptionally meritorious conduct in the performance of outstanding services to the Government of the United States as Marine Corps Aviation Officer on the staff of Chief of Combined Operations (British), from June 16, 1942, to April 26, 1943. In a position of great responsibility throughout this vital period, Colonel Campbell performed his duties with marked efficiency and skill, displaying a broad professional and technical knowledge of Naval and Marine aviation and its coordination with amphibious warfare which proved invaluable to combined operations. His brilliant diplomacy, sound judgment and outstanding devotion to duty contributed materially to the development of a cordial relationship, mutual trust and understanding between the American and British Forces.
