= List of United States Marine Corps aircraft groups =

This is a list of United States Marine Corps Aviation Groups (MAG, MACG, MATSG). Inactive groups are listed by their designation at the time they were decommissioned.

== Active Marine Aircraft Groups (MAG) ==
MAGs consist of a MAG headquarters, a Marine Aviation Logistic Squadron (MALS), a Marine Wing Support Squadron (MWSS), and from two to ten aircraft squadrons and/or detachments (HMH, HMHT, HMLA, HMLAT, VMM, VMMT, VMA, VMAT, VMFA, VMFA (AW), VMFT, VMGR, VMU). The MAG number is derived from the original Marine Aircraft Wing (MAW) where the MAG was activated (e.g. MAG 11 was the first MAG activated under 1st MAW and MAG 26 was 6th MAG activated under 2d MAW.) The exceptions to the MAG numbering sequence are the no longer active Marine Wing Support Groups (MWSG) which ended with the number 7 (i e. MWSG 17, 27, 37 & 47) and still active Marine Air Control Groups which end with 8 (I.e. 18, 28, 38 & 48).

Name	Unit Insignia	Date Commissioned	Location
Marine Aircraft Group 11		1 December 1920	Marine Corps Air Station Miramar
Marine Aircraft Group 12		1 March 1942	Marine Corps Air Station Iwakuni
Marine Aircraft Group 13		1 March 1942	Marine Corps Air Station Yuma
Marine Aircraft Group 14		1 March 1942	Marine Corps Air Station Cherry Point
Marine Aircraft Group 16		1 March 1952	Marine Corps Air Station Miramar
Marine Aircraft Group 24		1 March 1942	Marine Corps Air Station Kaneohe Bay
Marine Aircraft Group 26		16 June 1952	Marine Corps Air Station New River
Marine Aircraft Group 29		1 May 1972	Marine Corps Air Station New River
Marine Aircraft Group 31		1 February 1943	Marine Corps Air Station Beaufort
Marine Aircraft Group 36		2 June 1952	Marine Corps Air Station Futenma
Marine Aircraft Group 39		16 April 1968	Marine Corps Air Station Camp Pendleton
Marine Aircraft Group 41		1 January 1943	Naval Air Station Joint Reserve Base Fort Worth
Marine Aircraft Group 49		1 July 1969	JB McGuire-Dix-Lakehurst

== Active Marine Air Control Groups (MACG) ==
Consists of a MACG headquarters and a Marine Air Control Squadron (MACS), a Marine Air Support Squadron (MASS), a Marine Tactical Air Command Squadron (MTACS), a Marine Wing Communications Squadron (MWCS), and a Low Altitude Air Defense (LAAD) Battery/Detachment.

Name	Unit Insignia	Date Commissioned	Location
Marine Air Control Group 18		8 January 1944	Marine Corps Air Station Futenma
Marine Air Control Group 28		1 July 1943	Marine Corps Air Station Cherry Point
Marine Air Control Group 38		28 March 1951	Marine Corps Air Station Miramar
Marine Air Control Group 48		1 September 1967	Naval Station Great Lakes

== Active Marine Aviation Training Support Groups (MATSG) ==
Performs administrative control and training support for Marine Corps personnel assigned as either permanent party or as students undergoing formal naval aviation training programs. The group also provides Marines for ceremonial support and as special detail advisors.

Name	Unit Insignia	Date Commissioned	Location
Marine Aviation Training Support Group 21		16 December 1946	Naval Air Station Pensacola
Marine Aviation Training Support Group 22			Naval Air Station Corpus Christi
Marine Aviation Training Support Group 23		15 June 1983	Naval Air Station Pensacola
Marine Aviation Training Support Group 42			Naval Air Station Pensacola

== Decommissioned Marine Aircraft Groups ==
Name	Unit Insignia	Date Commissioned	Date Decommissioned	Notes
Marine Observation Group 1		15 May 1945	7 January 1946	Administrative control of VMO squadrons during WWII. Deactivated at Sasebo, Japan.
Marine Combat Crew Readiness Training Group 10		1 January 1969	31 March 1988	Provided specialized tactical and technical training for fixed wing pilots and aircrew.
Marine Aircraft Group 15		1 March 42	31 Dec 1988	
Marine Combat Crew Readiness Training Group 20		1968		
Marine Aircraft Group 25		7 Jun 1942	Jan 1956	Served as the nucleaus of South Pacific Combat Air Transport Command during WWII.
Marine Helicopter Training Group 30		20 January 1966		
Marine Aircraft Group 32		1 February 1943	30 April 1993	
Marine Aviation Training Support Group 33		15 November 1983	22 June 2016	Administrative command of USMC students in the USN F/A-18C, D Fleet Replacement Squadron aboard Naval Air Station Oceana
Marine Aircraft Group 34		24 Jul 1944	31 Mar 1946	
Marine Aircraft Group 35		1 Apr 1943	June 1959	
Marine Aircraft Group 40		1990	Approx 2010	
Marine Helicopter Training Group 40		30 June 1969	1 May 1972	
Marine Aircraft Group 42		1 September 1972	21 June 2008	
Marine Aircraft Group 43		1 January 1943	1 September 1972	Served as the headquarters for the Tactical Air Force, Tenth Army during the Battle of Okinawa. After the war was re-designated Marine Air Control Group 2 and participated in the Korean War. Was recommissioned in 1962 as part of the Marine Corps Reserve.
Marine Aircraft Group 45		1 February 1945		Based at Falalop Airfield at Naval Base Ulithi
Marine Aircraft Group 46		1 March 1944		
Marine Aircraft Group 50				MAG-50 is the Aviation Combat Element for the 5th Marine Expeditionary Brigade which only stands up when required.
Marine Aircraft Group 51		1 Jun 1944		
Marine Aircraft Group 52		20 Jun 1944	31 Oct 1945	
Marine Aircraft Group 53		1 April 1943	31 May 1947	Marine Corps' first night fighter group. Trained squadrons during World War II.
Marine Aviation Training Support Group 53		2 Sep 1986		Aviation training group located at Naval Air Station Whidbey Island, Washington. Furnished highly qualified Fleet Replacement EA-6B Prowler personnel to the Fleet Marine Force.
Marine Aircraft Group 56			15 July 1971	
Marine Aircraft Group 61		13 Jul 1943		
Marine Aircraft Group 62		1 April 1944	30 November 1945	PBJ medium bomber training group. Redesignated as Marine Air Defense Command 1 (MADC-1) on Okinawa on 1 August 1945.
Marine Glider Group 71		10 January 1942	24 May 1943	Group responsible for the Marine Corps Glider program until it was cancelled on 18 May 1943.
Marine Operational Training Group 81		1 Feb 1943	31 Dec 1945	Bomber pilot training unit located at MCAS Cherry Point, NC.
Marine Aircraft Group 91		10 Aug 1944	15 Mar 1946	
Marine Aircraft Group 92		15 Mar 1944	15 Mar 1945	
Marine Aircraft Group 93		1 Apr 1944	31 Oct 1945	
Marine Aircraft Group 94				
Marine Aircraft Groups, Dagupan			February 1945	Air Task Group formed in the Philippines in early 1945. Served under the 308th Bombardment Wing (Heavy)
Marine Aircraft Groups, Zamboanga			30 Aug 1945	Air Task Group formed in the Philippines in early 1945. Served under the 308th Bombardment Wing (Heavy)

== See also ==
- List of United States Marine Corps aircraft wings
- List of United States Marine Corps aircraft squadrons
- List of United States Marine Corps aviation support squadrons
- Carrier air wing
