= Karl S. Day =

United States Marine Corps general

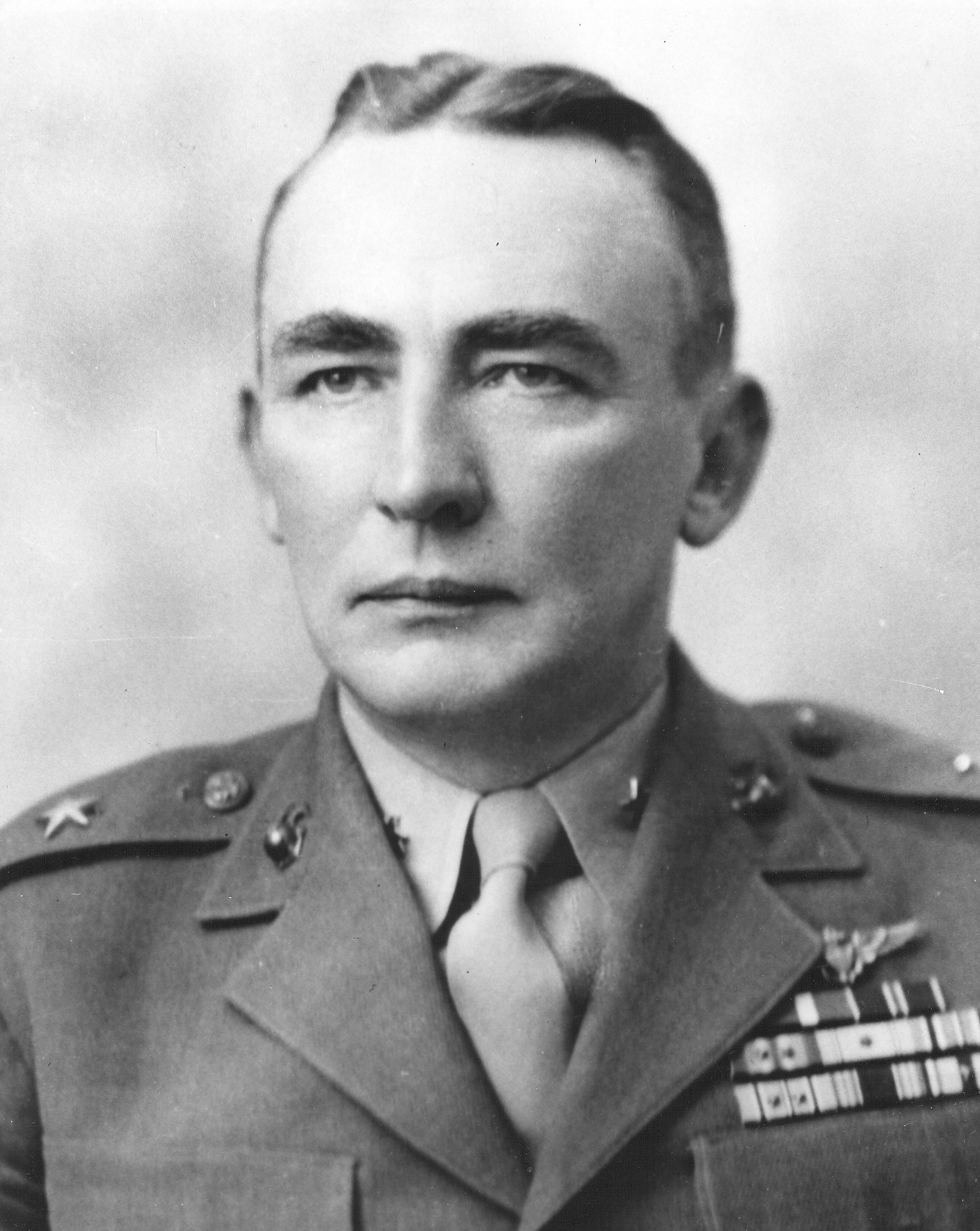
- Day as brigadier general
- Born: May 30, 1896; Friendship, Indiana, US
- Died: January 19, 1973 (aged 76); Mineola, New York, US
- Burial place: Arlington National Cemetery
- Military career
- Allegiance: United States
- Branch: United States Marine Corps
- Service years: 1917–1957
- Rank: Lieutenant General
- Service number: 0-2237
- Commands: Peleliu Air Base; Marine Air Group 21; Marine Operational Training Group 81
- Conflicts: World War I World War II: Battle of Peleliu
- Awards: Navy Cross; Bronze Star Medal

Karl Schmolsmire Day (May 30, 1896 – January 19, 1973) was a naval aviator of the United States Marine Corps Reserve who rose to the rank of Lieutenant General. A veteran of World War I, Day served with Northern Bombing Group on the Belgian front and awarded the Navy Cross, the United States military's second-highest decoration credited for valor in combat. He then resigned his commission and worked in various civilian jobs until the beginning of World War II. Day was subsequently recalled to active duty and served as Air Base Commander during the Battle of Peleliu in September 1944.

== Early career and World War I ==
Karl S. Day was born on May 30, 1896, in Friendship, Indiana, as the son of Franklin G. and Edith R. Day. After high school, Day enrolled the Ohio State University in Athens, Ohio, and graduated with bachelor's degree in 1917. He entered the Marine Corps service in May 1917 and was commissioned as a second lieutenant. Day was subsequently sent to the Officer School at Quantico for further training and following the graduation, he was ordered for the flight training. He was meantime promoted to the rank of first lieutenant.

Day sailed to France in July 1918 as a recently promoted captain and member of Squadron C, First Marine Aviation Force, Northern Bombing Group. The lack of airplanes in the Northern Bombing Group led him to be transferred to No. 218 Squadron of the Royal Air Force, where he flew DeHaviland-9 over the Belgium. He participated in the bombing missions against the enemy bases, aerodromes, submarine bases, ammunition dumps, railroad junctions until November 1918 and received Navy Cross for his efforts.

== Interwar period ==
Day returned to the United States in 1919 and resigned his commission. He then worked in various civil aviation jobs and joined Curtiss Wright Flying Service in 1929 as Assistant Business Manager. Three months later he was promoted to Operations Manager. He accepted a job offer as pilot for American Airlines in 1932 and later served as an instrument flight instructor. Day took part in the flight mail duties in 1933 and was forced to bail out of a disabled airplane and thus became member of the Caterpillar Club. During the prewar period, Day served with American Airlines successively as Line Pilot, Check Pilot and Assistant Flight Superintendent.

After the organization of first Marine Reserve Aviation unit in the New York area at Floyd Bennett Field in 1935, Day was promoted to the rank of major and appointed as commanding officer of the squadron. He served in this capacity until he was recalled to active duty in December 1940. Day also published a book entitled, ”Instrument and Radio Flying” in 1938.

== World War II ==
Day was attached to the staff of Commander Aircraft Battle Force under Vice admiral William Halsey Jr. and try to work out carrier tactics, which would permit pilots to make tactical use of bad weather. He found Navy and Marine Corps pilots lacking in knowledge of instrument flying, which was basic to bad weather operations.

Day was transferred to Washington, D.C. in February 1942 and attached to the Aviation Training Division, Navy Bureau of Aeronautics under Captain Arthur W. Radford and continued in his work on the flying conditions of Navy and Marine aviators. Because of his knowledges and abilities in the field of training, Day was ordered to Marine Corps Air Station Cherry Point, North Carolina, in February 1943 and organized and commanded Operational Training Squadron 8. He was promoted to the rank of lieutenant colonel for his new task.

Day's command was later redesignated Marine Operational Training Group 81 and was tasked with the training of pilots, aircrew and ground crew on the PBJ-1 multi-engined medium bombers. Day served in this capacity until the summer of 1944 and then was transferred to Pearl Harbor in order to participate in Peleliu operations in Palaus.

Day participated in the capture of Peleliu and went ashore on September 15, 1944. He was appointed Peleliu Air Base Commander and was responsible for the operation of the airfield, which became the principal staging area for the Philippine Campaign. He was promoted to the rank of colonel during that time and served in this capacity until June 1945, when he assumed command of Marine Air Group 21 on Guam and also held additional duty as Commander of Transport Air Group.

Day was preparing his unit for Operation Downfall, the Allied plan for the invasion of Japan, but official surrender of the Japanese Empire in August 1945 changed the plans. After the war, Day reverted to inactive status and remained in the Marine Corps Reserves. For his services in the Pacific area, Day was decorated with Bronze Star Medal with Combat "V" and also received the Navy Presidential Unit Citation with one star.

== Later life ==
Day was promoted to the rank of reserve brigadier general in 1948 and assumed command of the Volunteer Training Unit in New York City. He also served as a member of the Reserve Forces Policy Board and received promotion to reserve major general. He assumed duty as national President of the Marine Corps Reserve Officers Association in 1948 and held this assignment until 1956.

Upon retiring from the Marine Corps Reserve on March 1, 1957, Day was promoted to lieutenant general, a rank never before held by a Marine Corps Reserve officer. He continued in his job for American Airlines as Director of Flight Dispatch and was responsible for the integrating jet aircraft into American Airlines operation.

Day retired from the American Airlines in June 1962 and settled with his wife in East Williston, New York, and died on January 19, 1973, in Nassau Hospital in Mineola, New York. He is buried at Arlington National Cemetery, Virginia, together with his wife Margaret Raine Day (1900–1990). They had a son, John F., a former captain in the Marine Corps Reserve, and a daughter, Nancy.

== Decorations ==
Here is the ribbon bar of Lieutenant General Karl S. Day:

Naval Aviator Badge
1st Row	Navy Cross		Bronze Star Medal with Combat "V"
2nd Row	Navy Presidential Unit Citation with one star	Reserve Good Conduct Medal with one star	World War I Victory Medal with two battle clasps
3rd Row	American Defense Service Medal with Base clasp	American Campaign Medal	Asiatic-Pacific Campaign Medal with two 3/16 inch service stars
4th Row	World War II Victory Medal	Marine Corps Reserve Ribbon	Armed Forces Reserve Medal
