= Marine Aviation Logistics Squadron 40 =

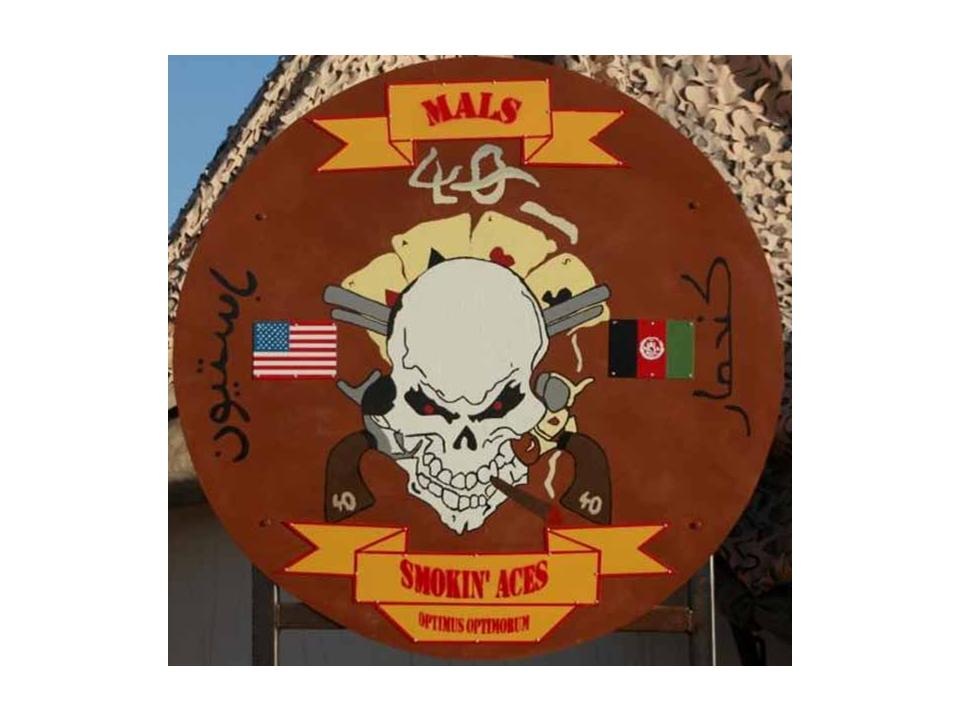
- MALS-40 insignia
- Country: United States
- Allegiance: United States of America
- Branch: United States Marine Corps
- Type: Logistics
- Role: Aviation logistics support
- Part of: Marine Aircraft Group 40; 2nd Marine Aircraft Wing
- Garrison/HQ: Marine Corps Air Station New River
- Nickname(s): Smokin Aces
- Motto(s): "Optimus Optimorium" "The Best of the Best"
- Engagements: Operation Enduring Freedom

Commanders
- Current commander: LtCol R.A. Blauw

Marine Aviation Logistics Squadron 40 (MALS-40) is an aviation logistics support unit of the United States Marine Corps. They are based at Marine Corps Air Station New River, North Carolina and fall under the command of Marine Aircraft Group 40 and the 2nd Marine Aircraft Wing.

== Mission ==
Provide the necessary logistical support including intermediate support, maintenance, ordnance and supply for the squadrons of Marine Aircraft Group 40 and Marine Expeditionary Brigade -Afghanistan.

== History ==
In 2009 a detachment from Marine Aviation Logistics Squadron 26, Marine Aviation Logistics Squadron 29 and Marine Aviation Logistics Squadron 31 was sent to Afghanistan as part of the Special Purpose Marine Air-Ground Task Force sent as part of the Marine Corps' force build up. When Marine Aircraft Group 40 was stood up the detachment was redesignated as MALS-40. MALS-40 was relieved by MALS-16 on 18 August 2011 at Camp Leatherneck, Afghanistan in support of Operation Enduring Freedom. In July 2013, Marines from MALS-31 and other Logistics squadrons from Cherry point and new river relieved Marines from 13.1 Deployment until January 2014 where they were relieved from Marines from MALS-16 and others in California. In late December 2013, a small conglomeration of Marine Aviation Logistics Squadrons 11, 13, 16, 39 and 41 arrived and the existing MALS-40 squadron was patched over by the MALS-70 Jackals.

== See also ==
- United States Marine Corps Aviation
- Organization of the United States Marine Corps
- List of United States Marine Corps aviation support units
