= Marine Aircraft Group 40 =

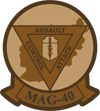
- MAG-40's insignia
- Active: 1990; 2009 – present
- Country: United States
- Allegiance: United States of America
- Branch: United States Marine Corps
- Type: Aviation Combat Element
- Role: Assault Support; Close-in Fire Support
- Part of: 2nd Marine Expeditionary Brigade
- Garrison/HQ: Camp Leatherneck
- Mottos: Assault, Attack, Control
- Engagements: Operation Desert Storm; Operation Enduring Freedom * Operation Moshtarak

Marine Aircraft Group 40 is a composite United States Marine Corps aviation unit that is based in Marine Corps Air Station Cherry Point and was deployed to Afghanistan in 2009. They served as the aviation combat element for 2nd Marine Expeditionary Brigade which was supporting Operation Enduring Freedom from spring 2009 through 4 April 2010 when they were relieved by the 3rd Marine Aircraft Wing (Fwd). The group is currently composed of two CH-53 squadrons, one light attack helicopter squadron, one AV-8B Harrier II squadron, one MV-22 Osprey squadron, one KC-130 tactical aerial refueling squadron, one unmanned aerial vehicle squadron and an aviation logistics squadron.

== Mission ==
Provide air support to Marine Air Ground Task Force commanders.

== Subordinate units ==
MALS-40 Smoking Aces (Bastion Bastards)

HMLA-169 Vipers

HMH-772 Hustler

== History ==
=== Gulf War ===
MAG-40 was originally stood up to support Exercise Teamwork and Exercise Bold Guard in Norway and West Germany in September/October 1990. When Iraq invaded Kuwait in August 1990 the MAG was designated as the aviation combat element of the 4th Marine Expeditionary Brigade. They began immediately deploying to the Persian Gulf. The group remained in the Persian Gulf as part of the Amphibious Task Force. During this time the group aviation assets included 20 AV-8Bs, 24 CH-46s, 14 CH-53s, 6 UH-1Ns, and 15 AH-1s.

=== Afghanistan ===
MAG-40 was reactivated as a composite aircraft group which serves as the headquarters for all Marine aviation units in Afghanistan beginning in the spring/summer of 2009. The group was located at an airfield in southern Afghanistan and is made up of 50 to 100 aircraft. During their time in Afghanistan, aircraft from the group flew just under 38,000 flight hours and moved over 141,000 passengers. They were relieved on 4 April 2010 by the 3rd Marine Aircraft Wing (Fwd) and will return to MCAS Cherry Point.

== See also ==
- United States Marine Corps Aviation
- List of United States Marine Corps aircraft groups
- List of United States Marine Corps aircraft squadrons
