= Northeastern Regional Airport =

Airport in North Carolina, United States

- IATA: EDE; ICAO: KEDE; FAA LID: EDE

Summary
- Airport type: Public
- Owner: Town of Edenton
- Serves: Edenton, North Carolina
- Elevation AMSL: 19 ft / 6 m
- Coordinates: 36°01′40″N 076°34′02″W
- Website: Official website

Map
- Interactive map of Northeastern Regional Airport

Runways
Direction	Length		Surface
Direction	ft	m	Surface
1/19	6,001	1,829	Asphalt

Statistics (2023)
- Aircraft operations (year ending 7/8/2023): 14,000
- Based aircraft: 19
- Source: Federal Aviation Administration

Northeastern Regional Airport (IATA: EDE, ICAO: KEDE, FAA LID: EDE) is a public use airport in Chowan County, North Carolina, United States. It is owned by the town of Edenton and located three nautical miles (6 km) southeast of its central business district. This airport is included in the National Plan of Integrated Airport Systems for 2011–2015, which categorized it as a general aviation facility.

== History ==
The airport was originally constructed during World War II by the United States Navy as Marine Corps Air Station Edenton. In this role, it hosted Marine Operational Training Group 81 (MOTG-81) and its subordinate squadrons. MOTG-81 trained pilots, air crewmen and ground crews on the land-based PBJ-1 medium bomber, a U.S. Navy / U.S. Marine Corps variant of the U.S. Army Air Forces' B-25 Mitchell bomber that was operated by Marine bombing squadrons, primarily in the Pacific theater.

On March 1, 1945, the installation was re-designated as Naval Auxiliary Air Station Edenton and was administered by Marine Air Base Squadron 14 (MABS-14). The Marine Corps reactivated the station on March 1, 1949 and began operations the following day. Marine Corps fighter squadrons flying the F9F-2 Panther and attack squadrons flying the AD-4B and AD-5 Skyraider were based there during the Korean War and early years of the Cold War. NAAS Edenton was decommissioned in the 1960s and turned over to the local government for conversion to a civilian airport.

The sole operational runway, Runway 1/19, was originally an 8,000 foot by 200 foot paved surface when control of the air station was relinquished by the military. Although the entire pavement length remains, the approach ends have been displaced and only a 6,000 foot by 100 foot section is currently maintained and usable. A Category I ILS approach has also been installed on Runway 19, albeit without any precision approach lighting. Although still standing, the former air station's air traffic control tower was abandoned upon the military's departure and has never reopened, leaving the airport as a non-towered airport as over 90% of all airports are in the U.S.A. Several of the other former military buildings have since been converted to multiple civilian aviation and non-aviation uses.

== Facilities and aircraft ==
Northeastern Regional Airport covers an area of 734 acres (297 ha) at an elevation of 19 feet (6 m) above mean sea level. It has one runway designated 1/19 with an asphalt surface measuring 6,001 by 100 feet (1,829 x 30 m).

For the 12-month period ending July 8, 2023 the airport had 14,000 aircraft operations, an average of 38 per day: 93% general aviation, 4% air taxi, and 4% military. At that time there were 19 aircraft based at this airport: 17 single-engine, 1 multi-engine, and 1 helicopter.

== See also ==
- List of airports in North Carolina
- List of United States Marine Corps Air Stations
