= Marine Aviation Training Support Group 53 =

Marine Aviation and Training Support Group 53
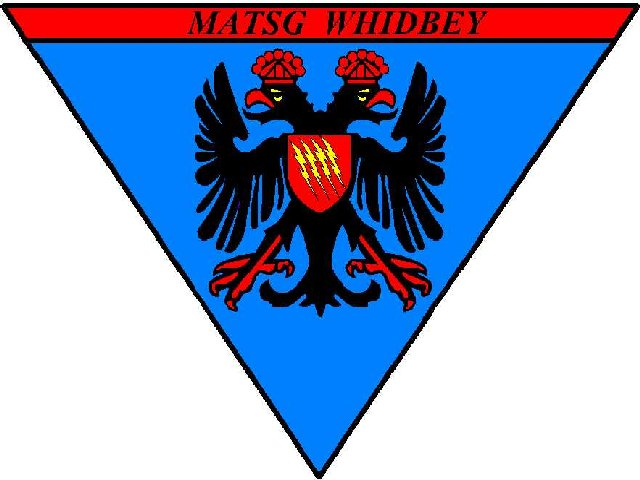
- MATSG-53 insignia
- Active: 2 September 1986 - unknown
- Country: United States
- Allegiance: United States of America
- Branch: United States Marine Corps
- Role: Training
- Garrison/HQ: Naval Air Station Whidbey Island

Marine Aviation Training Support Group 53 (MATSG-53) was a United States Marine Corps aviation training group located at Naval Air Station Whidbey Island, Washington.

== Mission ==
Furnish highly qualified Fleet Replacement EA-6B Prowler personnel to the Fleet Marine Force and also provide the Commandant of the Marine Corps administrative and logistical support for assigned Marine Corps Personnel and to perform other tasks directed by the Commandant.

== See also ==
- United States Marine Corps Aviation
- List of United States Marine Corps aircraft groups

== Notes ==
This article incorporates text in the public domain from the United States Marine Corps.
