= Marine Aviation Training Support Group 21 =

Marine Aviation and Training Support Group 21
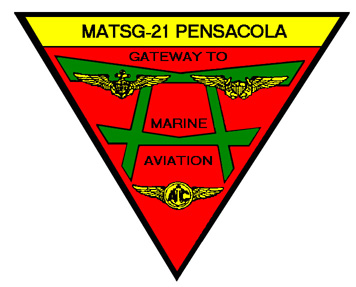
- MATSG-21 insignia
- Active: August 1922 - May 1947; Unknown - present
- Country: United States
- Branch: United States Marine Corps
- Role: Training
- Size: 725 Marines
- Garrison/HQ: Naval Air Station Pensacola
- Nickname: Gateway to Marine Aviation
- Engagements: 'World War II'

Commanders
- Current commander: Col. Daniel W. Caroffino
- Notable commanders: Karl S. Day; William L. Nyland

Marine Aviation and Training Support Group 21 (MATSG-21) is a United States Marine Corps aviation training group that was originally established in 1922 as the 2nd Aviation Group. During World War II the unit was known as Marine Aircraft Group 21 (MAG-21). Squadrons from MAG-21 fought in many of the opening battles of the war to include the Battle of Wake Island, Battle of Midway and as part of the Cactus Air Force during the Battle of Guadalcanal. The group was deactivated following the end of the war and was not reactivated until 2000 when the Marine Aviation Detachment at Naval Air Station Pensacola, Florida was renamed MATSG-21. The core of the MATSG personnel is derived from 175 officer instructors and 550 student naval aviators/naval flight officers.

== Mission ==
Provide administration and training support to all Marines aboard NAS Pensacola, NAS Whiting Field and CID Corry Station. They also provide ceremonial support for base and local events in the form of color guards and special detail advisors. While the MATSG's mission is administrative in nature, the command monitors the flow of students through the Naval Air Training Command, provides Marine Corps discipline and Marine Corps peculiar training.

== History ==
=== Early years ===
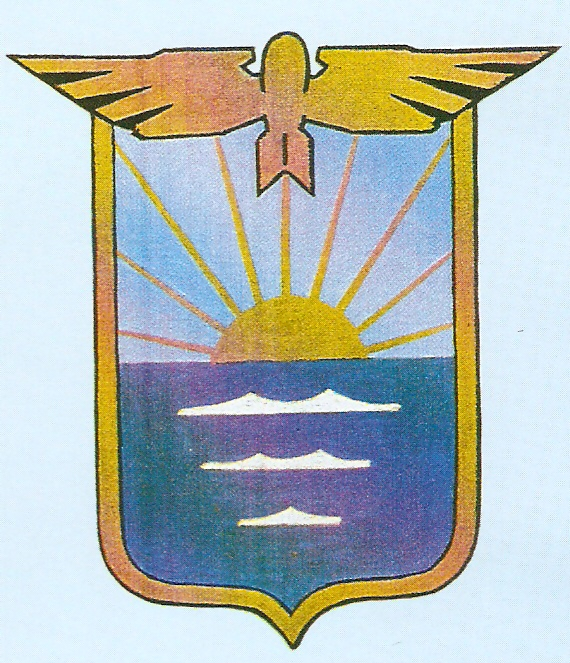
MAG-21 insignia during World War II.

The 2nd Aviation Group was formed at Naval Air Station San Diego in August 1922. They were redesignated Aircraft Squadrons, West Coast Expeditionary Force in July 1926. 8 January 1934 saw another name change, this time to Aircraft Two, Fleet Marine Force. On 1 May 1939, they were redesignated again to the 2nd Marine Aircraft Group. The group was sent overseas to Marine Corps Air Station Ewa, Hawaii in January 1941. There they consolidated with the headquarters of the 2nd Marine Aircraft Wing 10 July 1941, and less than a month later they were redesignated Marine Aircraft Group 21.

=== World War II ===
During the 7 December 1941 attack on Pearl Harbor MAG-21 suffered 17 casualties and all 21 of its aircraft were destroyed. Squadrons from MAG-21 fought at the Battle of Wake Island, Battle of Midway and as part of the Cactus Air Force during the Battle of Guadalcanal but the group itself remained at MCAS Ewa until February 1943 when they departed for Banika in the Russell Islands. By June 1943, MAG-21's squadrons were fighting large scale operations against Japanese installations in the northern Solomon Islands. The group moved to Efate in November 1943 and remained there until June 1944. Their final destination during the war was on Guam where it was based from August 1944 until the end of the war.

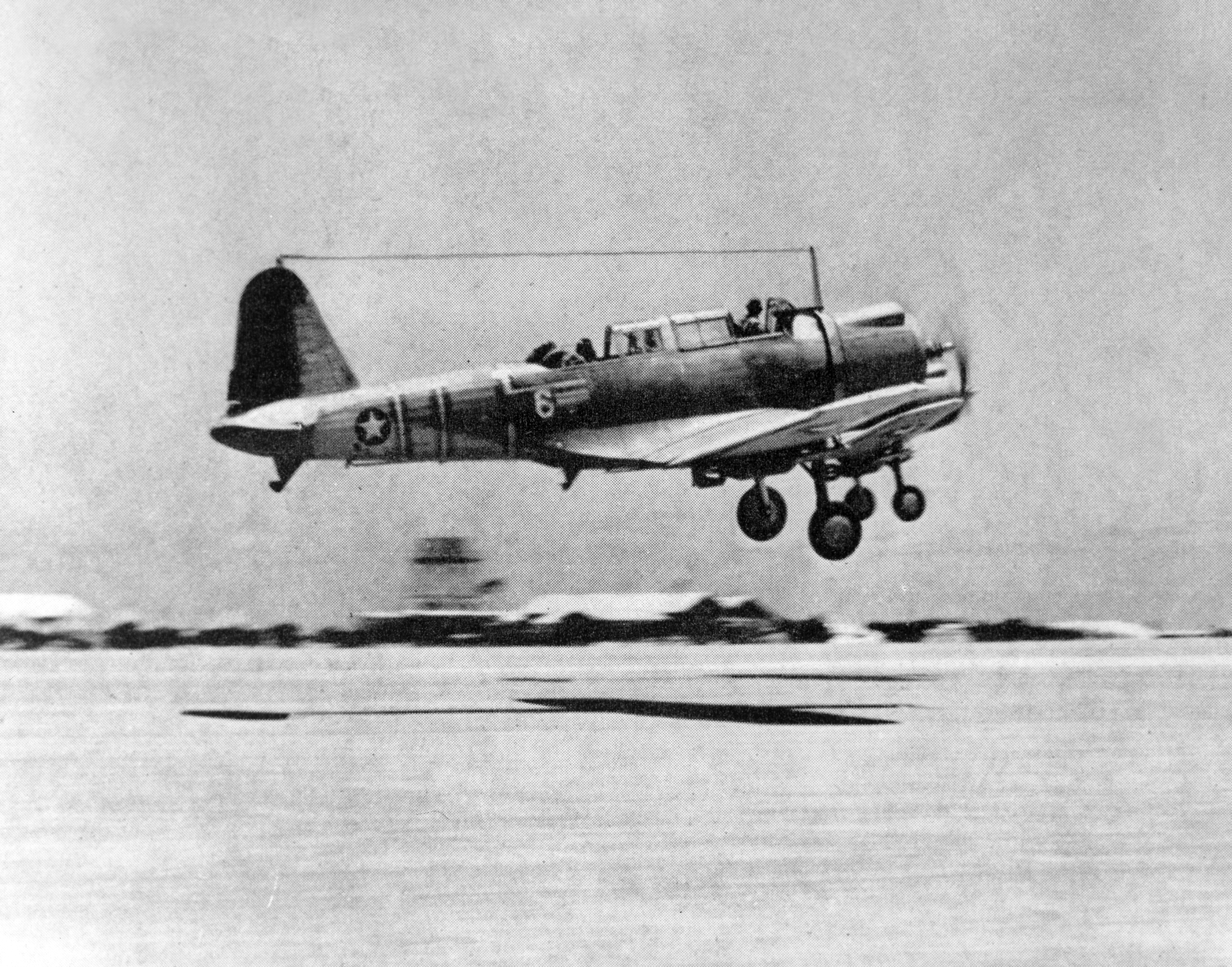
Two SB2U-3s of VMSB-241, MAG-21, take off from Eastern Island shortly before the Battle of Midway

The squadron returned to Marine Corps Air Station Miramar in March 1946 with follow on movement to Marine Corps Air Station Cherry Point, North Carolina. The group was decommissioned in June 1947.

=== 2000 ===
In May 2000, the Commandant of the Marine Corps directed the re-designation of Marine Aviation Training Support Group NAS Pensacola as Marine Aviation Training Support Group 21. All Marine Aviation Training Support Groups were redesignated to promote a sense of Marine Corps identity and tradition and allow them and their history to live on.

=== 2004-2005 ===
Hurricane Ivan caused 'catastrophic damage' to the historic NAS Pensacola. This included the buildings used to house MATSG-21, which forced its relocation to the Parachute Rigger Building on Farrar Rd.

=== 2006 – present ===
The command currently oversees training along the Gulf Coast to include Recon and Reserve activities. Additionally, the Enhanced Training Program provides Marines waiting for their Military Occupational Specialty (MOS) school to begin with the Marine Peculiar Training described on the unit website. Training includes leadership education and development, martial arts, pistol qualification, tactics, community involvement, physical fitness and professional military education.

- List of United States Marine Corps aircraft groups
- National Museum of Naval Aviation
