= Marine Operational Training Group 81 =

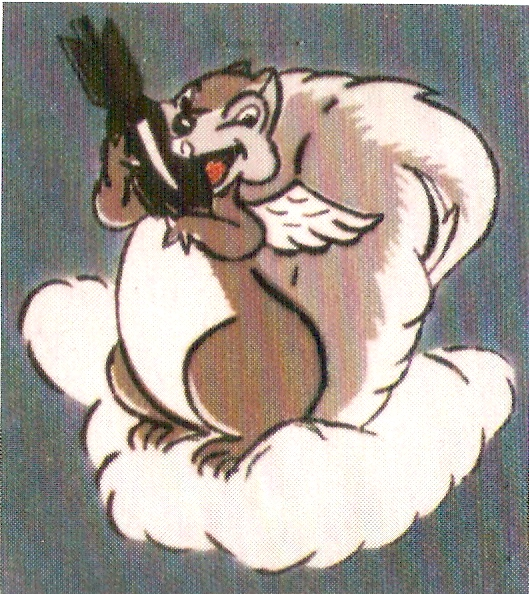
- MOTG-81 insignia
- Active: 1 February 1943 – December 1945
- Country: United States
- Allegiance: United States of America
- Branch: United States Marine Corps
- Role: Training
- Part of: Inactive
- Nickname(s): Flying Squirrels

Commanders
- Notable commanders: Karl S. Day

Aircraft flown
- Bomber: PBJ

Marine Operational Training Group 81 (MOTG-81) was a United States Marine Corps aviation training group that was established during World War II. Squadrons from MOTG-81 trained pilots, aircrew and ground crew on the PBJ-1 medium bomber. The Marine Corps divested its medium bomber fleet immediately after the war and the Group was decommissioned in December 1945.

== History ==
Operational Training Squadron 8 (OTS-8) was commissioned on 1 February 1943, at Marine Corps Air Station Cherry Point, North Carolina under the command of Colonel Karl S. Day. Its mission was to provide training for the Marine Corps’ PBJ pilots. From June through December 1943, the squadron trained 141 pilots, 345 aircrew and 195 ground crewman. The squadron transferred to Marine Corps Air Station Edenton on 3 December 1943, and on 1 January 1944, they were redesignated as Marine Operational Training Group 81 (MOTG-81). The group returned to MCAS Cherry Point in January 1945 and remained there until the end of the war.

== Squadrons ==
=== MOTS-811 ===
Marine Training Squadron 811 (MTS-811) was commissioned on 1 January 1944, at MCAS Edenton. They were redesignated Marine Operational Training Squadron 811 on 1 February 1945, and transferred to MCAS Cherry Point later that month on 23 February 1945. The squadron was decommissioned on 10 September 1945.

=== MOTS-812 ===
Marine Training Squadron 812 (MTS-812) was commissioned on 1 January 1944, at MCAS Edenton. They were redesignated Marine Operational Training Squadron 812 on 1 February 1945, and transferred to MCAS Cherry Point later that month on 20 February 1945. The squadron was decommissioned on 10 September 1945.

=== MOTS-813 ===
Marine Training Squadron 813 (MTS-813) was commissioned on 1 January 1944, at MCAS Edenton. They were redesignated Marine Operational Training Squadron 813 on 1 February 1945, and transferred to MCAS Cherry Point later that month on 19 February 1945. The squadron was decommissioned in November 1945.

=== MOTS-814 ===
Marine Training Squadron 814 (MTS-814) was commissioned on 1 January 1944, at MCAS Edenton. They were redesignated Marine Operational Training Squadron 814 on 1 February 1945, and transferred to MCAS Cherry Point later that month on 17 February 1945. The squadron was decommissioned in November 1945.

== See also ==
- United States Marine Corps Aviation
- List of United States Marine Corps aircraft groups
- List of decommissioned United States Marine Corps aircraft squadrons
