= Arthur C. Blades =

United States Marine Corps general

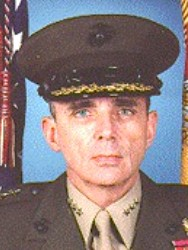
- Born: February 3, 1942 (age 84); Brooklyn, New York City U.S.
- Military career
- Allegiance: United States
- Branch: United States Marine Corps
- Service years: 1964–1997
- Rank: Lieutenant general

Arthur Charles Blades (born February 3, 1942) is a retired lieutenant general in the United States Marine Corps who served as Deputy Chief of Staff for Plans, Policies and Operations and as Deputy Chief of Staff for Aviation. He is a graduate of Villanova University and Pepperdine University.
