= Ross S. Plasterer =

United States Marine Corps general

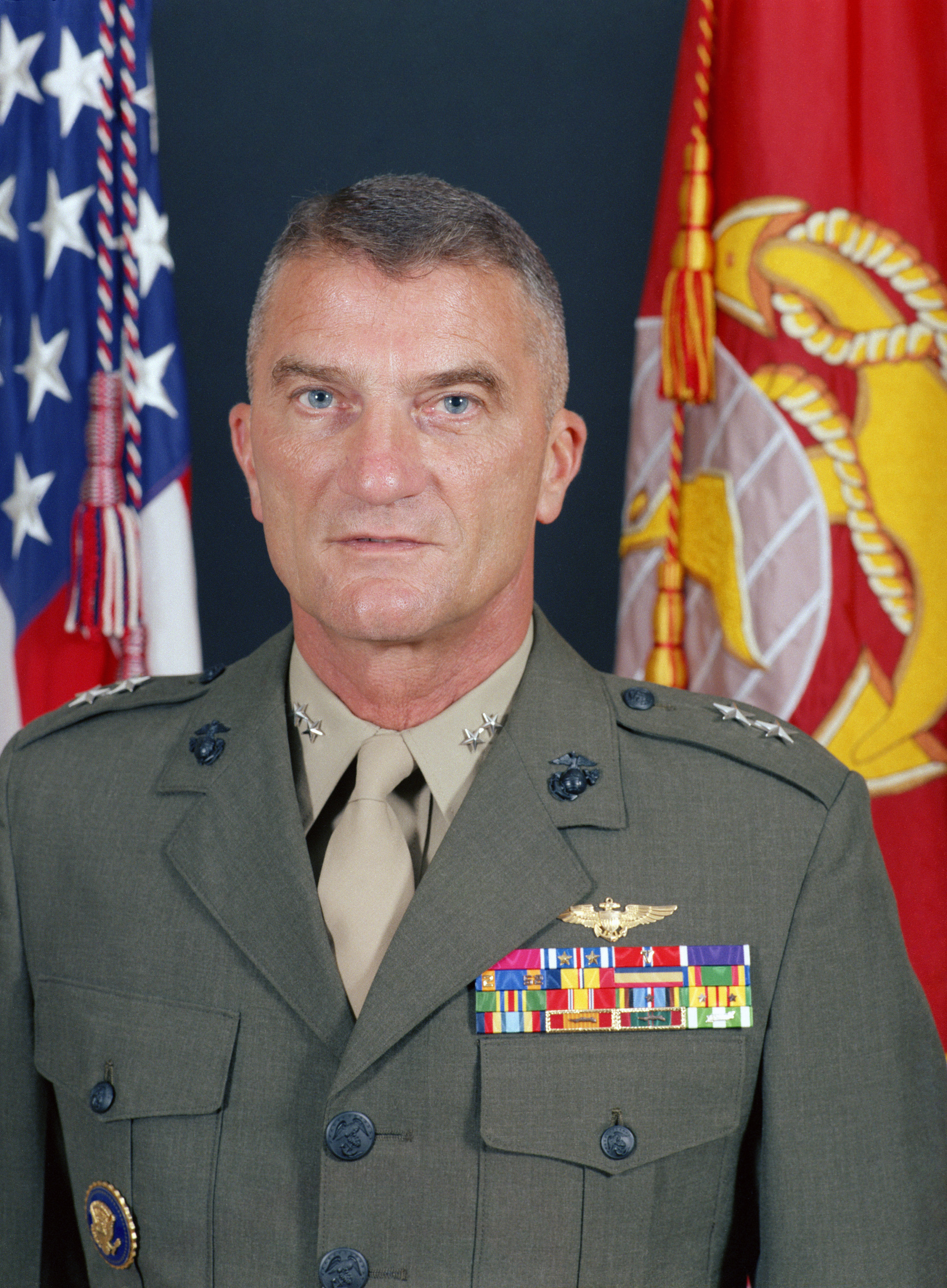
- Born: 1935 (age 90–91)
- Military career
- Allegiance: United States
- Branch: United States Marine Corps
- Service years: 1957–1980s
- Rank: Major general

Ross S. Plasterer (born 1935) is a retired major general in the United States Marine Corps who served as commanding general of the 1st Marine Aircraft Wing. He grew up in Lebanon, Pennsylvania.
