= Marine Air Defense Command 1 =

- Active: 1 Apr 1944 – 30 Nov 1945
- Country: United States
- Allegiance: United States of America
- Branch: United States Marine Corps
- Role: Aviation command & control
- Part of: N/A
- Engagements: World War II * Battle of Okinawa

Marine Air Defense Command 1 (MADC-1) was a United States Marine Corps aviation command and control unit based in Okinawa, Japan. Originally commissioned in April 1944 as Marine Aircraft Group 62 (MAG-62), the higher headquarters for new PBJ squadrons that were training on the east coast of the United States. In late 1944, MAG-62 was tasked with joining the 2nd Marine Aircraft Wing on Okinawa to serve as an additional headquarters element for all of the disparate forces that fell under the command of the Tactical Air Force, Tenth Army. On 15 August 1945, MAG-62 was re-designated as Marine Air Defense Command 1. MADC-1 was a short lived unit that was decommissioned on 30 November 1945, shortly after the surrender of Japan.

== Mission ==
Organize and train both ground personnel and aircrew for Marine Corps PBJ squadrons.

== History ==
=== World War II ===
==== Marine Aircraft Group 62 ====
Marine Aircraft Group 62 was commissioned on 1 April 1944, at Marine Corps Air Station Cherry Point, North Carolina. On 3 August 1944, MAG-62 was transferred under the control of the 9th Marine Aircraft Wing. The group was responsible for overseeing the training pilots, navigators, radiomen, gunners, and maintainers for the newly formed Marine Corps PBJ bomber squadrons. On 8 November 1944, Marine Aircraft Group 34 was assigned to MAG-62 for temporary duty. The Group transferred 67 PBJ variants to MAG-34 on 3 February at the direction of Wing Aircraft Transfer Authority #13-1945. MAG-62 departed MCAS Cherry Point on 15 February headed for Marine Corps Air Facility Newport, Arkansas arriving 17 February. At the time of the movement to MCAF Newport, the group consisted of a Headquarters Squadron, Service Squadron and one flying squadron, VMB-614. On 1 March, all Marine Corps SBD and SB2C aircraft at MCAF Newport were transferred to MAG-62. These older model aircraft were then transferred to numerous other Navy and Marine Corps facilities throughout the United States.

On 23 April 1945, MAG-62, with Headquarters Squadron 62 as the only subordinate unit, detached from the 9th MAW and departed MCAF Newport headed for California to join Marine Fleet Air, West Coast. The Group arrived at Port Hueneme on 27 April where it was ordered to join the 2nd Marine Aircraft Wing on Okinawa. The Group departed Port Hueneme on 5 May via military shipping and arrived at Okinawa on 2 July. Upon coming ashore, a temporary camp site was established in the vicinity of Awase Airfield.

==== Marine Air Defense Command 1 ====
On 1 August 1945, MAG-62 was re-designated at Marine Air Defense Command 1. For most of August, the MADC-1 focused on the construction of its headquarters area, Camp William Wallace, in the vicinity of Awase Airfield. The group was co-located with Marine Air Defense Command 2 on a hilltop just to the north of Nakagusuku Castle overlooking Nakagusuku Bay. Both units worked together to coordinate the air defense of Okinawa through the end of the war.

== Commanding Officers ==
- Col Byron F. Johnson (1 April 1944 – 22 September 1944)
- Col Thomas J. Walker Jr. (23 September 1944 – 1 March 1945)
- Col Carl J. Fleps (2 March 1945 – 31 August 1945)
- Col William C. Lemly (1 September 1945 – 30 November 1945)

== Unit awards ==
A unit citation or commendation is an award bestowed upon an organization for the action cited. Members of the unit who participated in said actions are allowed to wear on their uniforms the awarded unit citation. MADC-1 has been presented with the following awards:

Streamer	Award	Year(s)	Additional Info
	Presidential Unit Citation Streamer	1945	Okinawa
	World War II Victory Streamer	1941–1945	Pacific War
	Asiatic-Pacific Campaign Streamer with one Bronze Star	1945	Okinawa

== See also ==
- United States Marine Corps Aviation
- List of United States Marine Corps aircraft groups
