= 9th Marine Aircraft Wing =

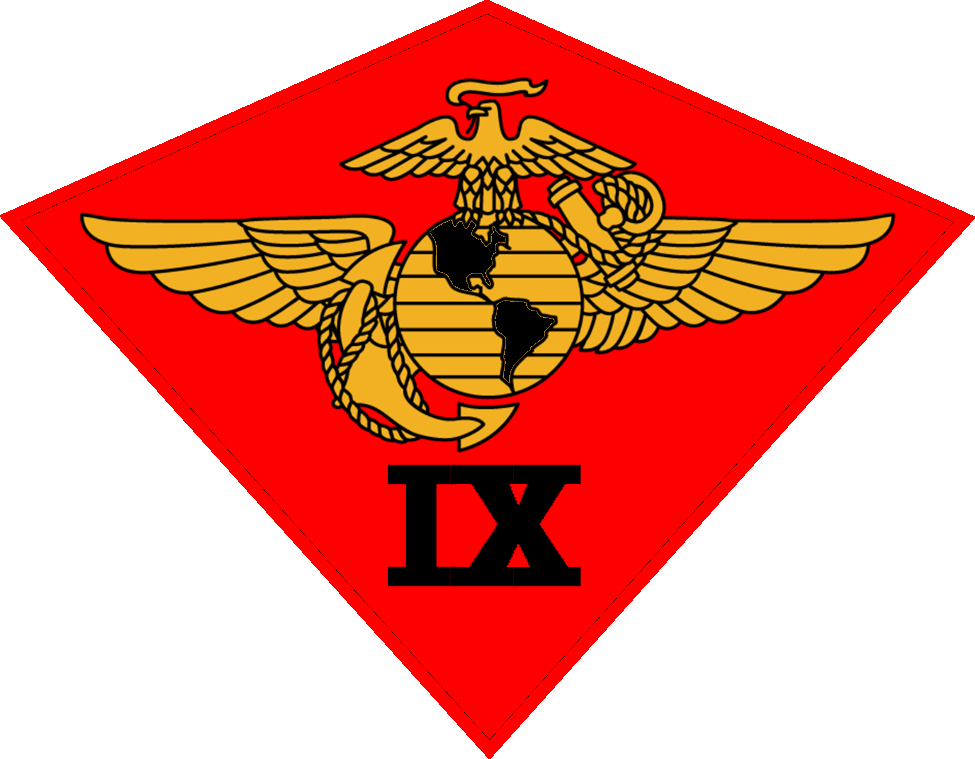
- Active: 1 April 1944 – 31 March 1946
- Country: United States
- Branch: USMC
- Type: Marine Aircraft Wing
- Role: Training
- Part of: Decommissioned
- Garrison/HQ: Marine Corps Air Station Cherry Point

The 9th Marine Aircraft Wing was an aviation unit of the United States Marine Corps based at Marine Corps Air Station Cherry Point, North Carolina. The wing was commissioned during World War II as a training unit for Marine Aviation personnel headed to the Pacific Theater.

== Mission ==
Train, equip and prepare Marine aviation units for combat

== Subordinate units ==
- Marine Aircraft Groups MAG-33, MAG-34, MAG-35, MAG-51, MAG-52, MAG-53, MAG-62, MAG-91, MAG-92, MAG-93, MAG-94
- Marine Corps Aviation Bases: Atlantic, Bogue, Congaree, Eagle Mountain Lake, Greeneville, Kinston, Newport, New River, Oak Grove, Parris Island, Walnut Ridge.

== History ==
The 9th Marine Aircraft Wing (9th MAW) was commissioned on 1 April 1944 at Marine Corps Air Station Cherry Point, North Carolina. 9th MAW replaced the 3rd Marine Aircraft Wing in the role of training, equipping, and preparing East Coast Marine Corps Aviation units for combat. It was also responsible for administering all of the airfields in the Cherry Point area. In late 1944, 9th MAW was almost disbanded in favor of a Marine Air Training Command, East Coast but that idea was never acted upon. The wing was decommissioned on 31 March 1946 in accordance with MarCorps Confidential Dispatch 052213 March 1946. This coincided with the 2nd Marine Aircraft Wing returning to the States and assuming control of Marine aviation units on the East Coast.

== Commanding officers ==
- Colonel Christian F. Schilt – 1 April – 16 June 1944
- Brigadier General Lewie G. Merritt – 21 September 1944 – 16 January 1945
- Brigadier General Christian F. Schilt – 17 January – 15 February 1945
- Colonel Lawrence T. Burke – 16 February – 22 April 1945
- Brigadier General Harold D. Campbell – 23 April 1945 – 31 March 1946

== See also ==
- List of United States Marine Corps aircraft wings
- List of United States Marine Corps aircraft squadrons

== Bibliography ==
- 9th MAW Unit History
