= Christian F. Schilt =

United States Marine Corps Medal of Honor recipient

Christian Frank Schilt
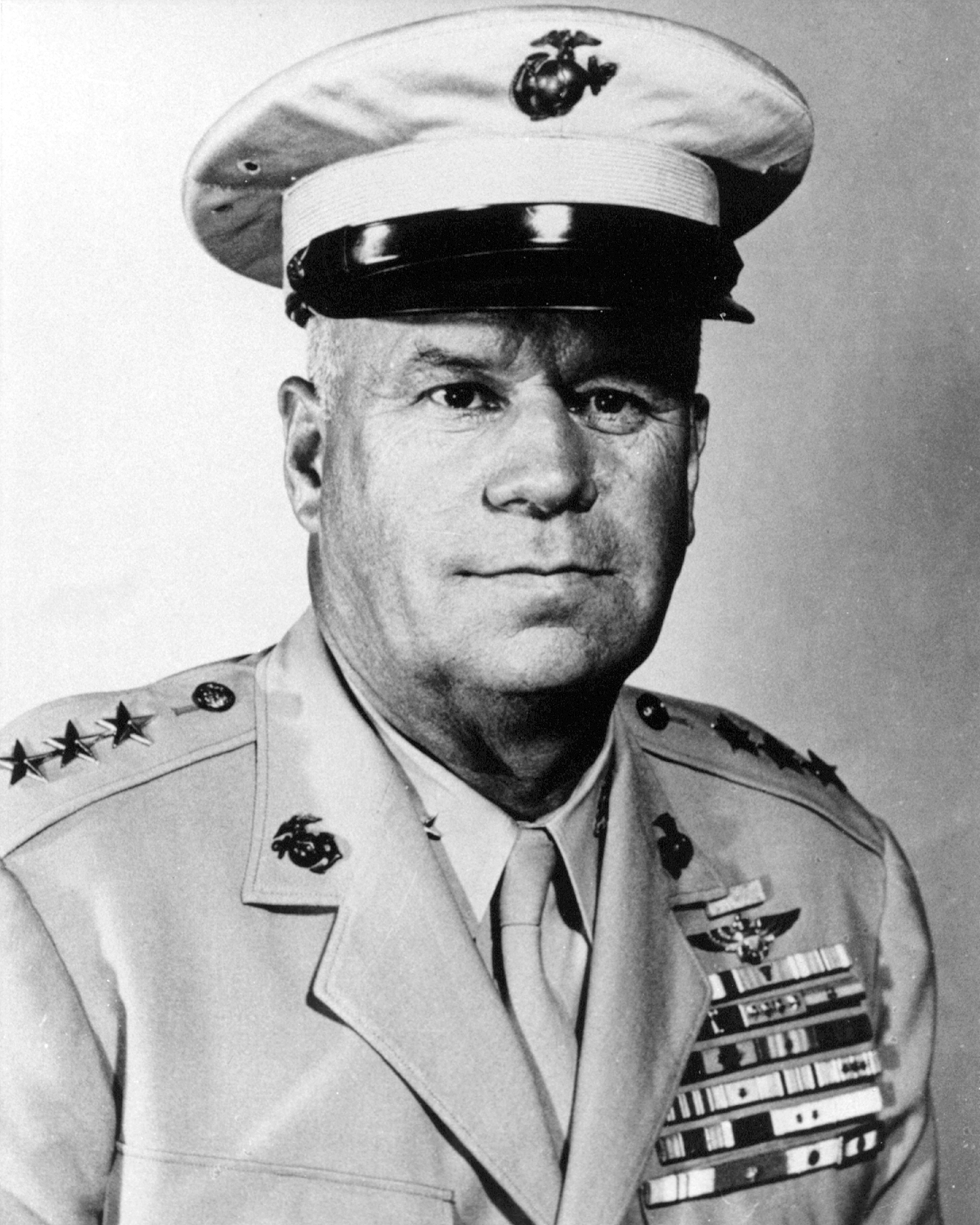
- General Christian F. Schilt, Medal of Honor recipient
- Born: March 19, 1895; Richland County, Illinois, U.S.
- Died: January 8, 1987 (aged 91); Norfolk, Virginia, U.S.
- Burial place: Arlington National Cemetery
- Military career
- Allegiance: United States of America
- Branch: United States Marine Corps
- Service years: 1917–1957
- Rank: General
- Commands: MCAS Cherry Point; 9th Marine Aircraft Wing; 1st Marine Aircraft Wing; Director of Aviation
- Conflicts: World War I; Banana Wars; Occupation of Haiti; Occupation of Nicaragua; World War II; Korean War
- Awards: Medal of Honor; Distinguished Service Medal; Legion of Merit; Distinguished Flying Cross (2); Bronze Star

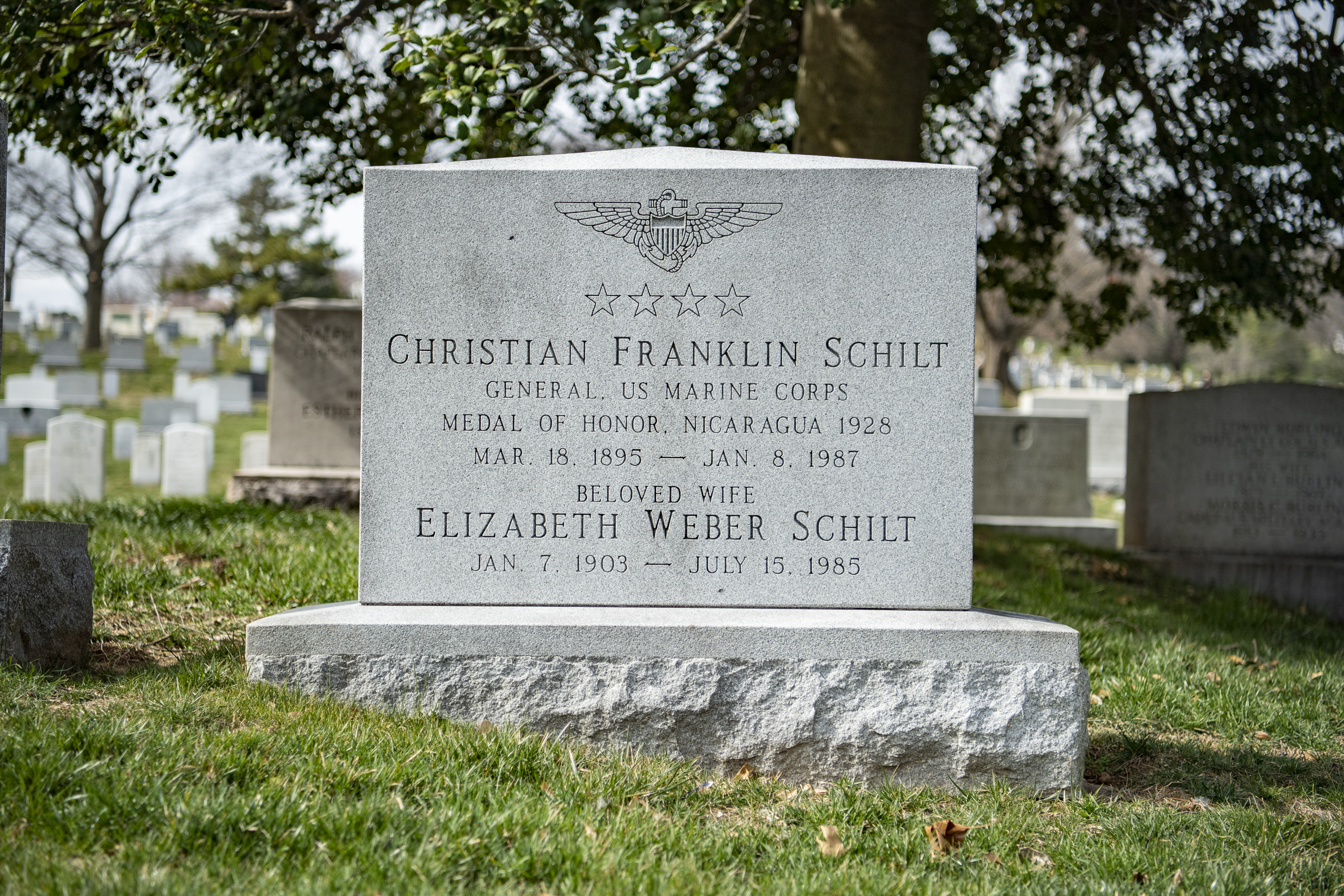
Grave at Arlington National Cemetery

Christian Frank Schilt (March 19, 1895 – January 8, 1987) was an American general in the U.S. Marine Corps. He was one of the first Marine Corps aviators and a recipient of the United States highest military decoration, the Medal of Honor. He received the Medal for using his biplane to evacuate wounded Marines under fire in Nicaragua.

In addition to his actions in Nicaragua he saw action in World War I, the Haitian and Nicaraguan campaigns, World War II and the Korean War. He retired after nearly 40 years of active service and was promoted to the rank of four-star general at retirement.

== Early life and education ==
Christian Frank Schilt was born March 19, 1895, in Richland County, Illinois, and after attending Rose Polytechnic Institute in Terre Haute, Indiana, he enlisted in the Marine Corps June 23, 1917.

== Military career ==
As an enlisted man he served at Ponta Delgada, in the Azores, with the 1st Marine Aeronautical Company, a seaplane squadron assigned to anti-submarine patrol. This was the first organized American air unit of any service to go overseas during World War I.

Returning to the United States as a corporal, he entered flight training at the Marine Flying Field, Miami, Florida. He was designated an aviator June 5, 1919, and commissioned a second lieutenant five days later. That October, he began his first tour of expeditionary duty as a member of Squadron "D," Marine Air Forces, 2nd Provisional Brigade, in Santo Domingo. He returned to the United States in February 1920, to enter the Marine Officers Training School, Marine Corps Base Quantico, Virginia.

Completing the course in August 1920, he went overseas again the following month, joining squadron "E" of the 1st Provisional Brigade, at Port-au-Prince, Haiti. He was transferred to the 2d Brigade the following March to make an aerial survey and mosaic map of the coast line of the Dominican Republic. After completing that assignment he returned to Quantico in October 1922.

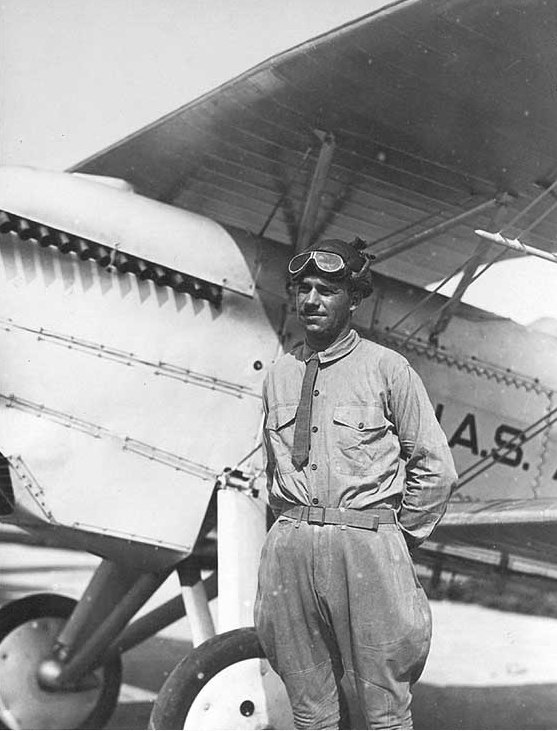
1stLt Schilt beside a Curtiss F6C Hawk at Naval Air Station Anacostia, Washington, D.C., August 1925

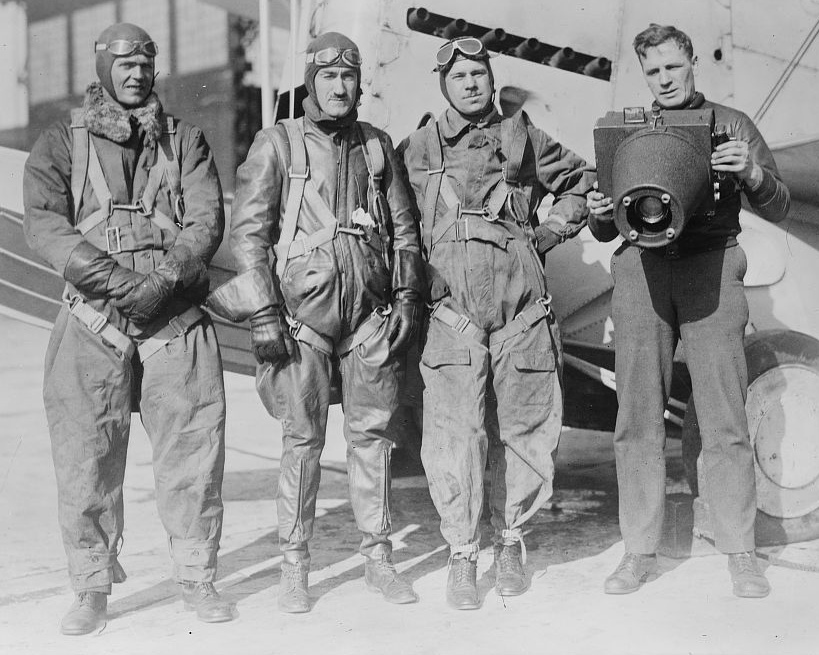
Sgt. Benjamin Franklin Belcher, Capt. Jame E. Davis, Lt. Christian Frank Schilt, and Sgt. Hubert H. Dogant on February 23, 1927

Except for service at Naval Air Station, Pensacola, Florida, from January to July 1923, and completion of a three-month photographic course at the Air Service Technical School, Chanute Field, Illinois, in 1925, Schilt remained at Quantico for the next five years. While attached to that post, he won second place in the Schneider International Seaplane Race at Norfolk, in November 1926, flying a special Curtiss racer at a speed of 231.3 mph (372.2 km/h) over seven laps of a triangular 50 km course. In November 1927, Schilt was ordered to Managua, Nicaragua, where he joined Observation Squadron 7-M. He was awarded the Medal of Honor for heroism from 6 to January 8, 1928, at Quilali, Nicaragua, where two Marine patrols were ambushed and cut off by Sandino forces. Then a lieutenant, he voluntarily risked his life to make ten flights into the besieged town, evacuating 18 casualties and carrying in a replacement commander and badly needed medical supplies. To make a landing strip on the village's rough, rolling, main street, the Marines on the ground had to burn and level part of the town, and since his O2U Corsair biplane had no brakes they had to stop it by dragging from its wings as soon as it touched down.

Hostile fire on landings and take-offs, plus low-hanging clouds, mountains and tricky air currents, added to the difficulty of the flights, which the citation describes as feats of "almost superhuman skill combined with personal courage of the highest order."

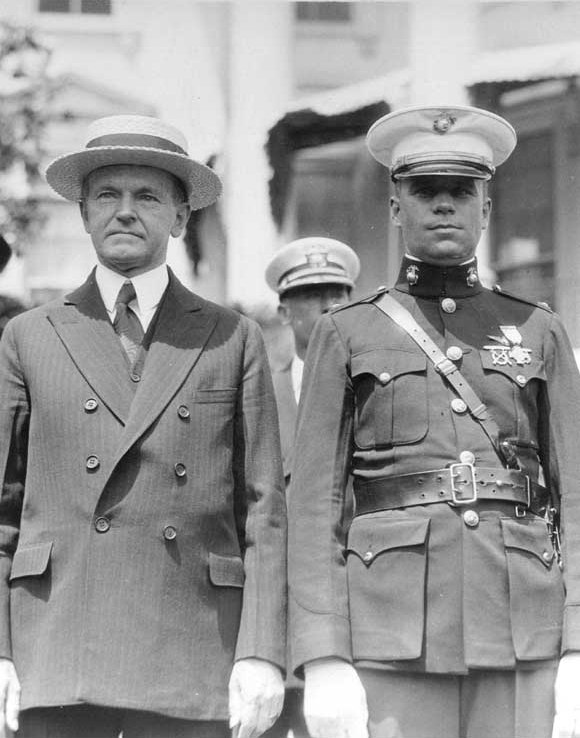
1stLt Schilt and President Coolidge at the White House, Medal of Honor presentation, c 1928. Note that his Medal of Honor is in the Tiffany Cross pattern.

He returned to the United States in August 1929, and after commanding Fighter Squadron 5-N at Quantico, was named Chief Test Pilot and Flight and Aerological Officer at the Naval Aircraft Factory, Philadelphia. He served in that capacity for two years before returning to Quantico in June 1932, to enter the Company Officers' Course at the Marine Corps Schools. He completed that course in July 1933, and a month later entered the Air Corps Tactical School at Montgomery, Alabama.

Graduating from the tactical school in June 1934, Schilt began another four years at Quantico, where he was air officer on the staff of the commanding general, Fleet Marine Force, and later a squadron commander with Aircraft One, Fleet Marine Force. He then served from May 1938 to June 1940, as executive officer of the Marine Corps Air Station St. Thomas, on the Virgin Islands. After that he returned to Quantico to complete the Senior Course in the Marine Corps Schools and serve with Base Air Detachment 1, Fleet Marine Force.

He left Quantico in May 1941, when he was assigned to the American embassy in London, United Kingdom, as an assistant naval attache for air. In that capacity he traveled through England and Scotland and served as a naval observer in North Africa and the Middle East. He returned to the United States in August 1941, and was assigned to Quantico as engineer and supply officer of the 1st Marine Aircraft Wing.

In September 1942, he arrived on Guadalcanal as assistant chief of staff, 1st Marine Air Wing. After that he was commander of Marine Aircraft Group 11, Chief of Staff of the 1st Wing and commanding officer of the Strike and Search Patrol Commands, Solomon Islands. He returned to the United States in September 1943, and commanded Marine Corps Air Station Cherry Point, North Carolina, until March of the following year.

From April to June 1944, Schilt headed the 9th Marine Aircraft Wing during the organization of that unit. He then served for six months as chief of staff of the wing and for another month as its commander before returning to the Pacific theater in February 1945. This time he was Island Commander, Peleliu, from March to August 1945, and commanding general, Air Defense Command, 2d Marine Aircraft Wing, on Okinawa until October 1945, when he took command of the 2d Wing.

Returning from Okinawa in March 1946, the general reported to the Naval Air Station Glenview, Illinois, the following month. There he headed the Marine Air Reserve Training Command until July 1949, when he was ordered to Naval Station Norfolk as chief of staff, Fleet Marine Force, Atlantic. He served in that capacity until he took command of the 1st Marine Aircraft Wing in Korea in July 1951.

In April 1952, Schilt returned from Korea to serve in Hawaii as deputy commander, Fleet Marine Force, Pacific, until February 1953 when he became commanding general, Aircraft, Fleet Marine Force, Pacific, at the Marine Corps Air Station El Toro, California. He left El Toro in July 1955, and assumed his duties at Headquarters Marine Corps as Director of Aviation on August 1, 1955, as a lieutenant general. He served in this capacity until retirement from the Marine Corps on April 1, 1957, when he was promoted to full general.

General Schilt died on January 8, 1987, at age 91, in Norfolk, Virginia, and was buried with full military honors in Arlington National Cemetery. His grave can be found in section 2E, lot 151–2.

=== Military awards and decorations ===
During his career he received the following military decorations:

Naval Aviator Badge
1st Row	Medal of Honor		Navy Distinguished Service Medal	Legion of Merit w/ valor device
2nd Row	Distinguished Flying Cross w/ gold star	Bronze Star w/ valor device	Air Medal w/ 4 gold stars	Navy Presidential Unit Citation w/ 1 service star
3rd Row	Marine Corps Good Conduct Medal	Marine Corps Expeditionary Medal w/ 1 service star	World War I Victory Medal w/ Overseas clasp	Nicaraguan Campaign Medal (1933)
4th Row	American Defense Service Medal w/ Base clasp	American Campaign Medal	Asiatic-Pacific Campaign Medal w/ 3 service stars	World War II Victory Medal
5th Row	Navy Occupation Service Medal w/ Asia clasp	National Defense Service Medal	Korean Service Medal w/ 5 service stars	Nicaraguan Medal of Merit w/ silver star
6th Row	Nicaraguan Cross of Valor	Order of Military Merit, Taeguk Cordon Medal	Korean Presidential Unit Citation	United Nations Korea Medal

=== Medal of Honor citation ===
Rank and organization: First Lieutenant, U.S. Marine Corps. Place and date: Quilali, Nicaragua, 6, 7 and January 8, 1928. Entered service at: Illinois. Born: March 1, 1895, Richland County, Ill.

Citation:

During the progress of an insurrection at Quilali, Nicaragua, 6, 7, and 8 January 1928, 1st Lt. Schilt, then a member of a marine expedition which had suffered severe losses in killed and wounded, volunteered under almost impossible conditions to evacuate the wounded by air and transport a relief commanding officer to assume charge of a very serious situation. 1st Lt Schilt bravely undertook this dangerous and important task and, by taking off a total of 10 times in the rough, rolling street of a partially burning village, under hostile infantry fire on each occasion, succeeded in accomplishing his mission, thereby actually saving 3 lives and bringing supplies and aid to others in desperate need.

=== Distinguished Service Medal citation ===
Citation:

The President of the United States of America, authorized by Act of Congress, July 9, 1918, takes pleasure in presenting the Distinguished Service Medal to Major General Christian Franklin Schilt, United States Marine Corps, for exceptionally meritorious service to the United States while in a position of great responsibility from 27 July 1951 to 5 April 1952. As Commanding General of the FIRST Marine Air Wing, United States Marine Corps, General Schilt provided United Nations Forces engaged in action against the enemy in Korea with outstanding tactical air support for ground operations. Operating from three separate sites, including an aircraft carrier, General Schilt skillfully integrated his unit into Far East Air Forces interdiction program by implementing highly efficient fighter bomber, night intruder and night interdiction operations against enemy support missions. Concurrently, the Wing performed productive photo reconnaissance missions, helicopter airlift, and air rescue operations. The Wing contributed to the destruction of ammunition stockpiles, fuel lubrications and other combat material, and proved an efficient deterrent to the build-up of the enemy's war machine. Achieving success in all its operations, the Wing materially aided the overall Far East Air Forces operations. The outstanding combat efficiency of the First Marine Air Wing in sustained operations against the enemy in Korea was achieved through the able and mature guidance of General Schilt. His vast experience in aerial combat was not only a valuable source of aid to operations of the United Nations Forces, but also evoked the full and unceasing effort of his command toward the United Nations' objective in Korea. General Schilt's significant achievements in combat, and his resourceful leadership sustained the highest traditions of the military service and reflected great credit upon himself, the United States Marine Corps, and the United Nations forces.

Military offices
Preceded by Field Harris	Commanding General of the 1st Marine Aircraft Wing; July 27, 1951 - April 12, 1952	Succeeded by Clayton C. Jerome
Preceded by William O. Brice	Director of Aviation; July 31, 1955 - March 31, 1957	Succeeded by Verne J. McCaul

== See also ==
- List of Medal of Honor recipients
