= Tactical Air Force, Tenth Army =

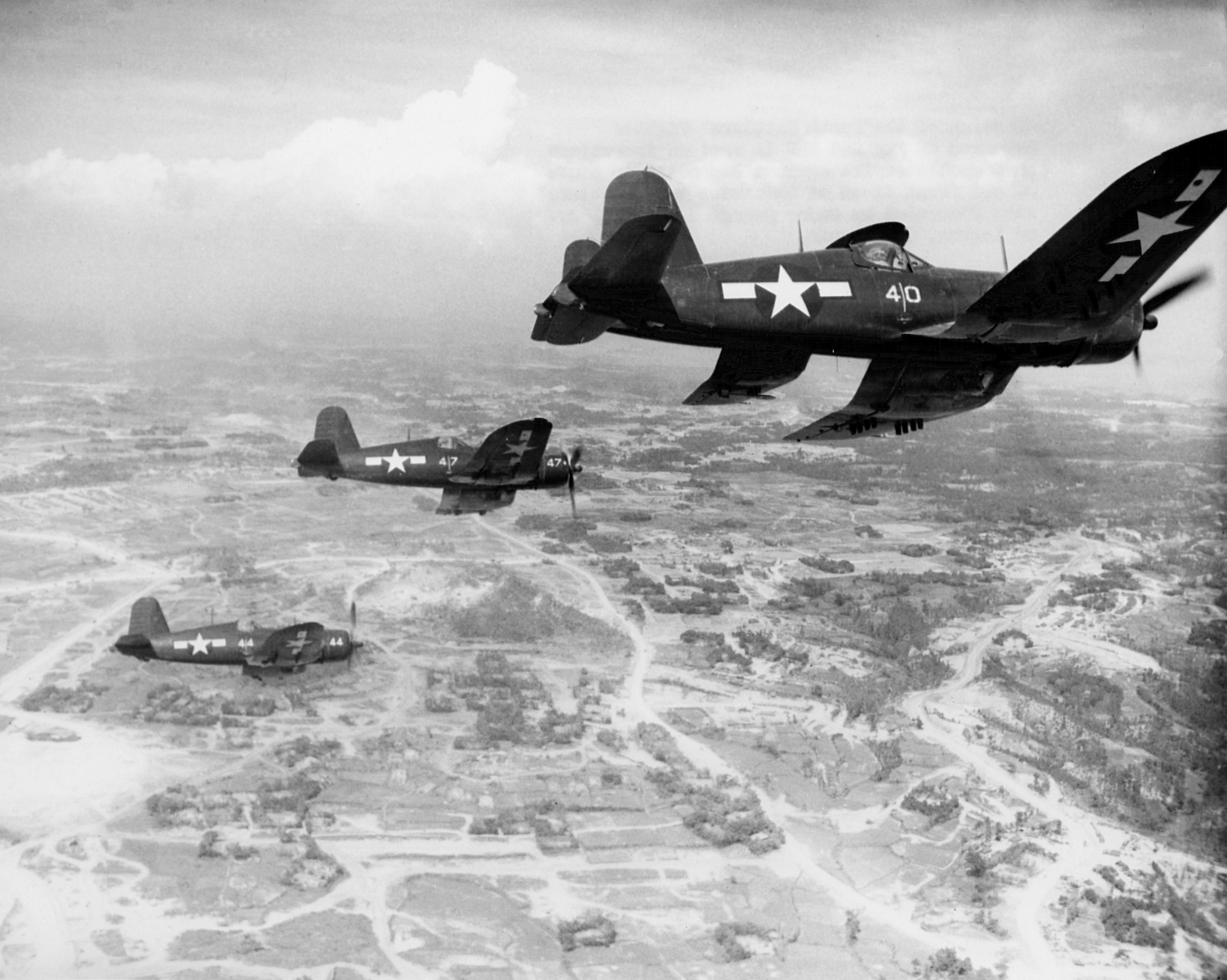
- F4U Corsairs from VMF-323 flying over Okinawa
- Active: 21 November 1944 - 14 July 1945
- Country: United States of America
- Engagements: Battle of Okinawa

Commanders
- Notable commanders: Francis P. Mulcahy; Louis E. Woods

The Tactical Air Force, Tenth Army (TAF) was a joint aviation command of the Tenth United States Army that was responsible for commanding all land-based aviation and aviation command and control units during the Battle of Okinawa. The TAF's headquarters was provided by the 2nd Marine Aircraft Wing and it was the largest joint aviation unit under Marine Corps command during World War II. During the battle, the TAF was commanded by Major General Francis P. Mulcahy until ill-health forced him to be relieved by MajGen Louis E. Woods. According to United States sources, TAF aircraft were responsible for shooting down 637 Japanese aircraft during the battle.

== Missions ==
- To establish headquarters and tactical units ashore as soon as practicable after L-Day.
- To execute the air support mission assigned by the Commander, Joint Expeditionary Force, as long as he functioned as such in the area.
- Thereafter, to provide for air defense and air support for the ground and supporting surface forces in the Okinawa area by application of available air power as dictated by the overall situation and as directed by higher.

== History ==
=== Organization and Planning ===
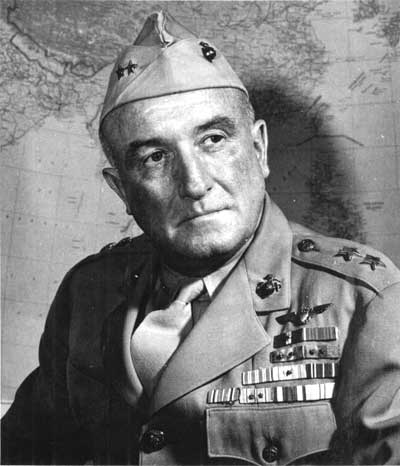
MajGen Francis P. Mulcahy, first Commanding General of the Tactical Air Force, Tenth Army.

The Tactical Air Force, Tenth Army (TAF) was activated at Schofield Barracks, Oahu, Territory of Hawaii on November 21, 1944 under the command of Major General Francis P. Mulcahy, then commander of the 2nd Marine Aircraft Wing. 2nd MAW was chosen to lead the TAF because it had recent combat experience from Peleliu and more importantly it was available in Hawaii as planning for the invasion began to ramp up. When first formed, TAF's Marine Corps and United States Army Air Forces units were scattered across the Pacific Theater. Expecting a very large number of kamikaze attacks, MajGen Mulcahy selected his Chief of Staff, Brigadier General William J. Wallace, to serve as the head of TAF's most important task unit, the Air Defense Command. The ADC was initially responsible for overseeing the day and night fighters squadrons from three Marine Aircraft Groups and the four ground based early warning squadrons. BGen Wallace was a seasoned veteran who had previous combat experience as a Marine Air Group commander during the Guadalcanal Campaign. Marine Aircraft Group 43 (MAG-43), under the command of one of the most experienced radar officers in the Marine Corps Robert O. Bisson, was also brought from Marine Corps Air Station El Centro, California to Hawaii to serve as the administrative headquarters for the TAF.

Planning for Okinawa continued while TAF struggled to get its staff together. The headquarters was not basically organized until December 1944 by which time the invasion plan was well along. By the time that the first echelon of TAF personnel embarked upon naval shipping at Pearl Harbor in late February 1945, TAF consisted of 112 officers and 398 enlisted personnel.

The plan that developed for the invasion of Okinawa was very straight forward with only a few modifications installed to improve air to ground coordination, incorporate more than one ground based radar squadron and integrate a large number of night fighter squadrons. TAF planners envisioned the units primary missions as follows:

- 1) Establish headquarters and tactical units ashore as soon as practicable after L-Day.
- 2) Execute the air support mission assigned by the Commander, Joint Expeditionary Force, as long as he functioned as such in the area.
- 3) Provide air defense and air support for the ground and supporting surface forces in the Okinawa area by application of available air power as dictated by the overall situation and as directed by higher authority.

==== Air Defense Command ====
TAF's Air Defense Command was tasked with the following missions:

- Commanding all fighter aircraft assigned to TAF in execution of all assigned defensive and offensive missions.
- Establishing Air Defense Command and an Air Defense Control Center as soon as possible.
- Assuming control of air defense including AA artillery and searchlights from Commander Air Support Control Units on order.
- Establishing and operating an early air warning net.
- Furnishing direct defense of the area in conjunction with Fleet aircraft present.
- Being prepared from time of initial establishment for emergency assistance to shipborne Air Support Control Units in handling carrier based aircraft forced to land ashore.

=== Okinawa ===
==== Getting established ====
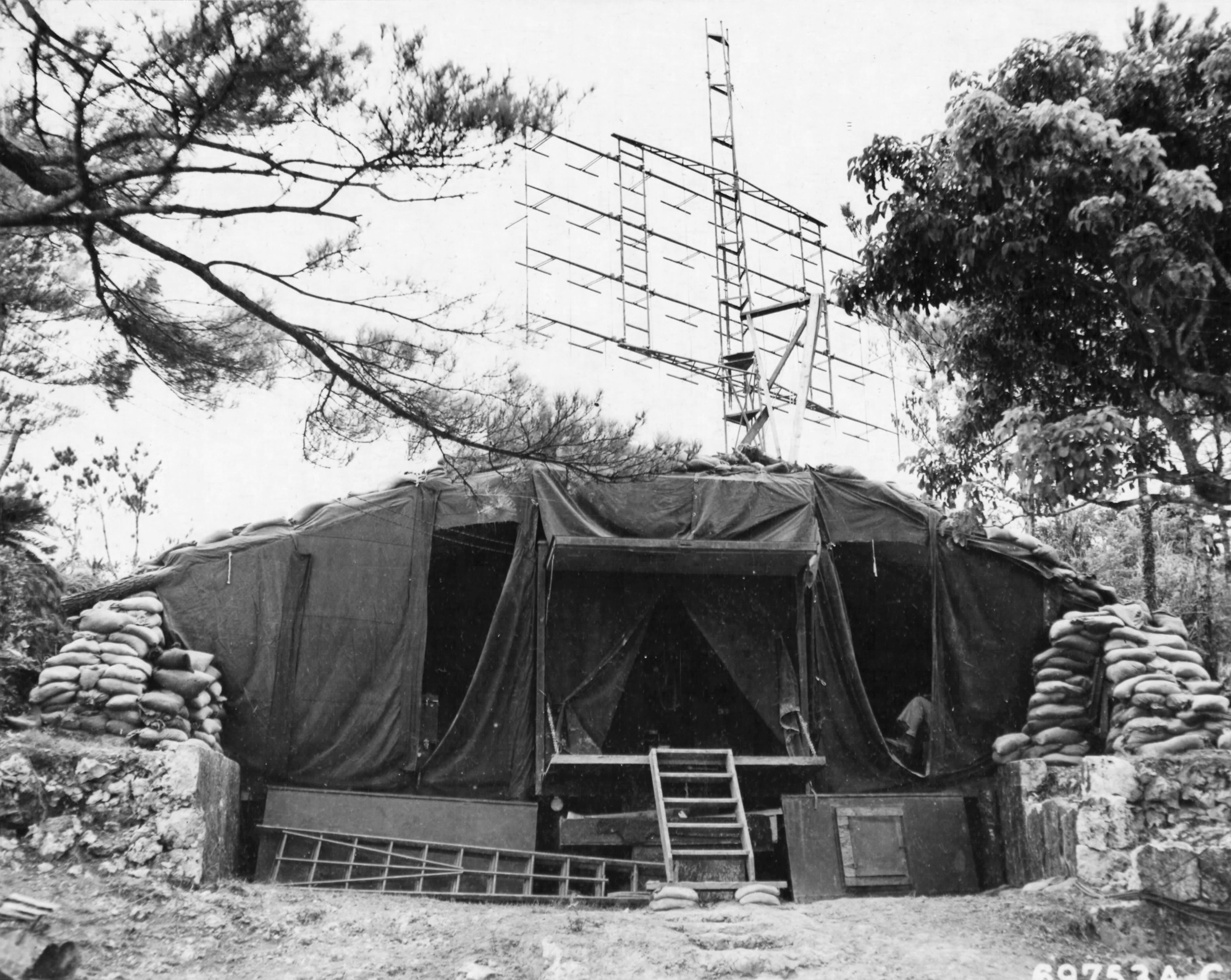
SCR-270 Radar from Air Warning Squadron 6

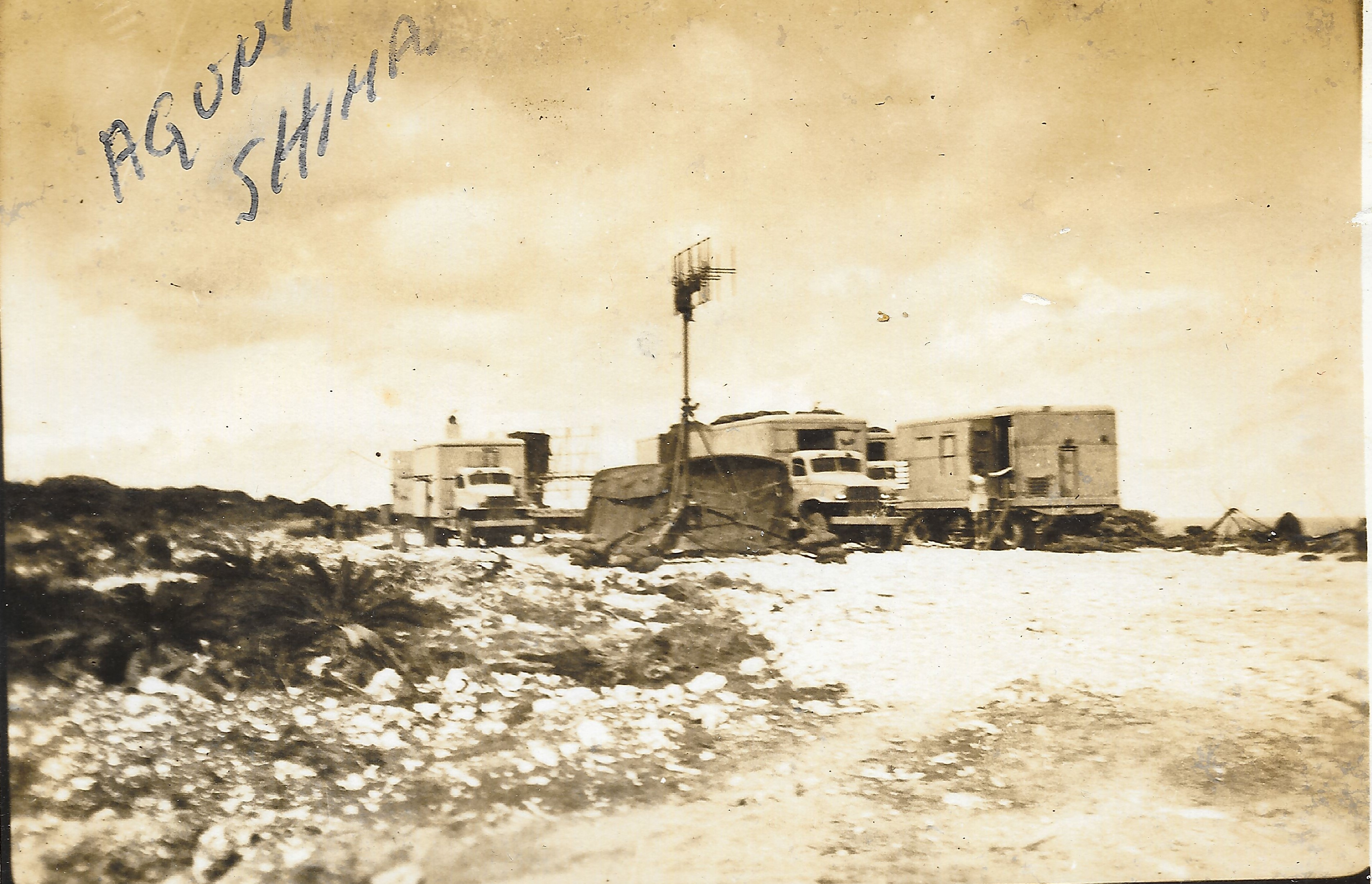
AWS-8 radar vans on Aguni Shima

Kadena and Yontan Airfields were seized by 1230 on L-Day, April 1, 1945. Engineers immediately began to expand and repair the runways. The first TAF aircraft to come ashore on Okinawa were Marine Corps OY-1 Grasshoppers from VMO-3. MAG-43's Air Defense Control Center (ADCC), callsign "Handyman", established itself in a position between Yontan Airfield and Kadena Airfield and took control of the air defense fight ashore on April 7, 1945. The ADCC was initially operated from the back of two LVTs. On April 16, MAG-43 established its full ADCC in a farmer's house about a half mile southeast of Yontan Airfield in the village of Yomitan. Initially Air Warning Squadron 7 and Air Warning Squadron 8 were the only two ground based early warning units detailed to land during the first few days after D-Day. AWS-7 moved north with the Marine Divisions and established itself at Hedo Point once it was secured. AWS-8 landed with the 77th Infantry Division before D-Day to secure Zamami Shima on March 27, 1945. Air Warning Squadrons 1 and Air Warning Squadron 6 were scheduled to land later in April. These units were tasked to work in conjunction with the Navy's radar picket ships off the coast. Because of the kamikaze threat it was quickly determined that the initial two air warning squadrons were insufficient for the task. One of the Navy's great lesson's learned from the Battle of Okinawa was that failure to secure outlying islands and install adequate ground based radar coverage was partially responsible for the devastating losses that the radar picket ships suffered. By June 30, MAG-43 consisted of 1,926 Marines with another 505 attached US Army personnel.

==== Air Defense Fight ====
HEARTIEST CONGRATULATION TO YOU AND YOUR FIGHTER COMMAND FOR HAVING SHOT DOWN YESTERDAY EVENING A FORCE OF 32 ENEMY PLANES THAT WOULD OTHERWISE HAVE BEEN IN POSITION TO INFLICT SERIOUS DAMAGE TO OUR SHIPPING AND GROUND FORCES HERE X MORE POWER TO YOU ALL XX BUCKNER

-Communique of April 23, 1945 from LtGen Simon B. Buckner, Commanding General, Tenth Army to MajGen Mulcahy, Commanding General, Tactical Air Force.

Marine Aircraft Group 31 (MAG-31) was the first Marine air group ashore landing on Yontan Airfield on April 7. Flying in from the escort carriers USS Sitkoh Bay and the USS Breton (CVE-23), the group was able to immediately put 80 of 109 F4U Corsairs into the fight and maintained a combat air patrol from 1750 until dark to aid in the fight against the kamikaze attacks that were devastating the American fleet. Marine Aircraft Group 33 was next ashore on April 9. On April 14, responsibility for providing CAP aircraft for Okinawa was transferred from the Navy's Task Force 58 to the TAF. That same day TAF was also tasked with providing an additional two plane CAP's for three of the Navy's radar picket stations.

By the end of April the TAF had two Marine Aircraft Groups ashore giving them six F4U Corsair squadrons and two night fighter squadrons equipped with Grumman F6F Hellcats TAF initially maintained a CAP of 12 aircraft overhead however as the kamikaze threat grew it increased to 32 aircraft overhead with an additional 12 aircraft on ground alert. For the month, TAF aircraft had flown 3,521 combat air patrols sorties and were responsible for assisting in the shooting down on 143 enemy aircraft.

May 1945 saw TAF strength increased with the addition of Marine Aircraft Group 22 and the 318th Fighter Group. With the additional aircraft assigned the combat air patrols were pushed further north of Okinawa. During May TAF aircraft flew more than 6,700 sorties in defense of the island and naval shipping claiming 369 enemy aircraft shot down. Not all of the action for the TAF was in the skies over Okinawa. On May 24, the Japanese mounted Operation Gi-gou: a company of Giretsu Kuteitai commandos were airlifted in a suicide attack on Yomitan. They destroyed 70,000 US gallons (260,000 L) of fuel and nine planes before being killed by the defenders, who lost two men. During the same period TAF lost 109 aircraft with only three lost to direct enemy action. At the end of May and into June, the remainder of the fighter squadrons from the United States Army Air Corps's 301st Fighter Wing and Marine Aircraft Group 14 arrived. Eventually, ADC commanded a total of 25 fighter squadrons. Between June 3–7, fighters from the TAF engaged the ninth massed kamikaze attack of the campaign. Of the 118 enemy planes shot down, TAF aircraft accounted for 35 of them.

==== Close Air Support ====
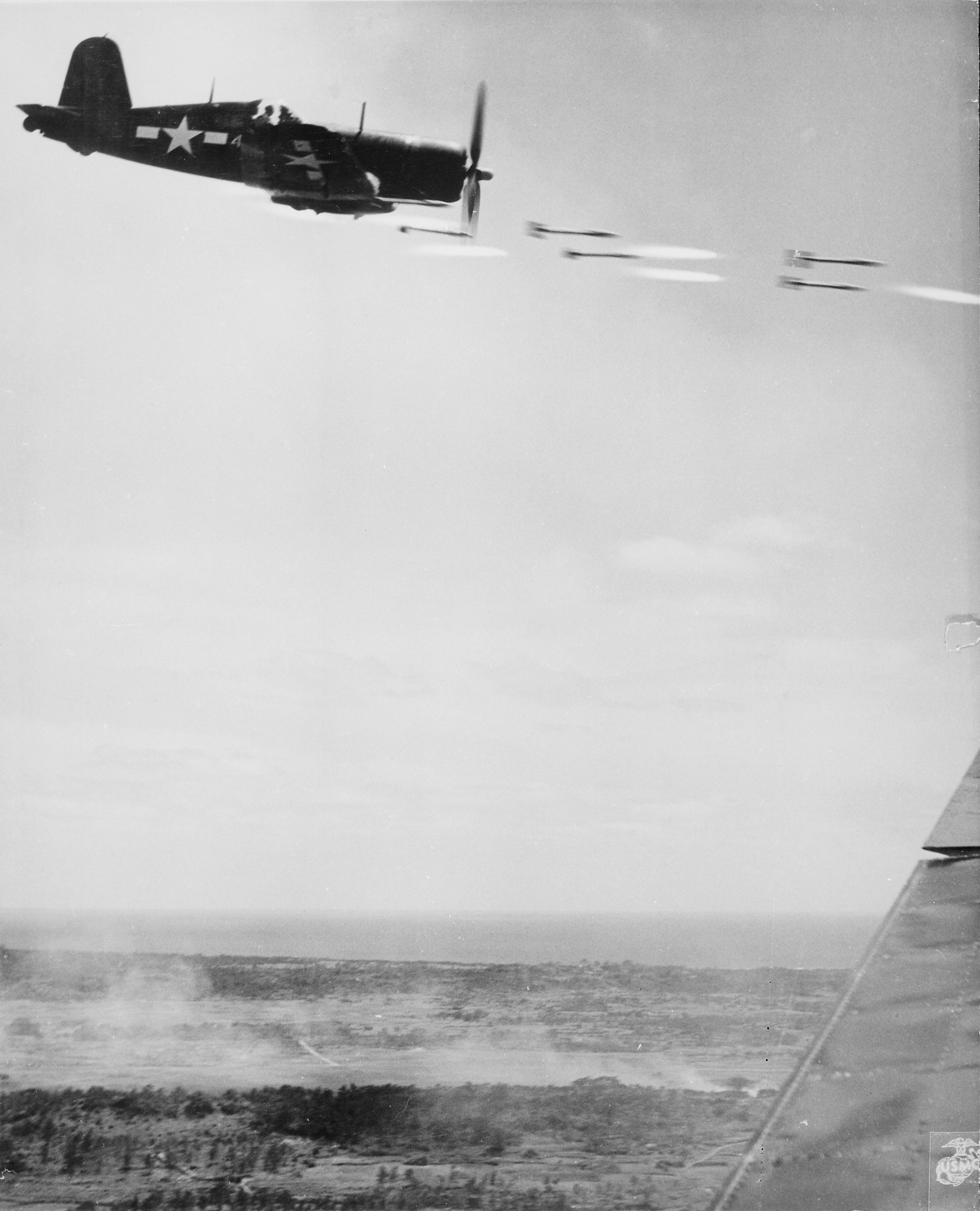
A Marine Corps F4U Corsair fires its rockets at a Japanese stronghold on Okinawa.

The original plan for the Battle of Okinawa had called for a significant portion of assigned aviation assets to conduct close air support (CAS). This did not come to fruition during the battle because of the kamikaze threat, difficult terrain and the nature of Japanese cave defenses. The nature of the kamikaze threat also meant that the defense of Okinawa from attack by the air became their primary mission. Because of the focus on air defense, approximately 60% of the close air support sorties during the battle were provided by Marine and Navy aircraft flying from Task Force 58's escort carriers. In fact, the first CAS sorties by TAF aircraft did not occur until April 13 and for the month of April only 20% of available sorties were tasked with conducting CAS.

A newly established command and control agency was utilized to coordinate and direct close air support missions during the battle. Three Landing Force Air Support Control Units (LFASCU), under the command of Colonel Vernon E. Megee, came ashore on the first day of the invasion and established their agencies ashore. LFASCU 1 was in support of the III Amphibious Corps, while LFASCU-2 supported the Army's XXIV Corps and LFASCU-3 coordinated close air support for the higher headquarters of the Tenth Army.

==== After the battle and disbandment ====
TAF's Bomber Command was originally planned to consist of the 41st Bomber Group (Medium) and the 319th Bomber Group (Light). These two groups did not begin operations on Okinawa until late June/early July. At the same time, two heavy bomber groups were also added - the 494th and 11th Bomber Groups (Heavy). With a large number of forces and a very limited mission as the fighting on Okinawa subsided in June, the Tactical Air Force began executing missions against targets in the Northern Ryukus, Kyushu, and China. It was at this point that the headquarters designed for the Battle of Okinawa was no longer needed and the unit was disbanded on July 13, 1945. Marine squadrons were transferred to the newly established Ryukuan Command and Army Air Corps assets reverted to the tactical control of the Far East Air Force.

During its existence TAF squadrons flew a total of 38,192 sorties and claimed shooting down 625 enemy aircraft as well as engaging Japanese shipping and providing close air support. During three months of combat over the skies of Okinawa, Marine squadrons assigned to the TAF accounted for 484½ planes shot down helping to create 21 new Marine Corps aces. MAG-33 had the most of any single Marine air group claiming 214 shoot-downs.

== Assigned Forces ==
Units assigned to the TAF during its existence are as follows:

- Headquarters Squadron, 2nd Marine Aircraft Wing
- Air Defense Command (Task Unit 99.2.1) (BGen William J. Wallace)

Marine Aircraft Group 43 (LtCol Robert O. Bisson)

HQ Squadron, Marine Aircraft Group 43
Air Warning Squadron 1 (Capt Edward R. Stainback)
Air Warning Squadron 6(Capt Clarence C. Gordon)
Air Warning Squadron 7(Capt Paul E. Bardet)
Air Warning Squadron 8(Maj Frank B. Freese)
Air Warning Squadron 11(Capt John L. Carnegie)
Co B, 568th Signal Air Warning Battalion
Det 1, 305th Fighter Control Squadron
927th Signal Air Warning Company
5th Radar Calibration Det

Marine Aircraft Group 31 (Colonel John C. Munn)

HQ Squadron, Marine Aircraft Group 31
Service Squadron 31
VMF-224(Maj James W. Poindexter)
VMF-311(Maj Perry L. Shuman)
VMF-441(Maj Robert O. White)
VMF(N)-542(Maj William C. Kellum / Maj Robert B. Porter)

301st Fighter Wing

318th Fighter Group

19th Fighter Squadron
73rd Fighter Squadron
333rd Fighter Squadron
548th Night Fighter Squadron

413th Fighter Group

11th Fighter Squadron
21st Fighter Squadron
34th Fighter Squadron

507th Fighter Group

463rd Fighter Squadron
464th Fighter Squadron
465th Fighter Squadron

Marine Aircraft Group 33 (Col Ward E. Dickey)

HQ Squadron, Marine Aircraft Group 33
Service Squadron 33
VMF-312
VMF-322
VMF-323
VMF(N)-543

Marine Aircraft Group 22 (Col. Daniel W. Torrey)

HQ Squadron, Marine Aircraft Group 22
Service Squadron 22
VMF-113 (Maj. Hensley Williams)
VMF-314 (Maj. Robert E. Cameron)
VMF-422 (Maj. Elkin S. Dew)
VMF(N)-533 (Maj. Marion M. Magruder / Maj. Samuel B Folsom Jr.)

Marine Aircraft Group 14(Col Edward A. Montgomery)

HQ Squadron, Marine Aircraft Group 14
Service Squadron 14
VMF-212(Maj John P. McMahon)
VMF-222(Maj Harold A. Harwood)
VMF-223(Maj Howard E. King)

- Anti-Submarine Unit (Task Unit 99.2.3)

VMTB-232 (Maj Allan A. Feldmeier)
VMTB-131 (Maj Douglas A. Bangert / Maj. Thomas A Reese)

- Photographic Unit (Task Unit 99.2.4)

28th Photo Reconnaissance Squadron

- Bomber Command (Task Unit 99.2.2)

H&HS, VII Bomber Command
41st Bombardment Group

389th Air Service Group
47th Bombardment Squadron
48th Bombardment Squadron
396th Bombardment Squadron
820th Bombardment Squadron

494th Bombardment Group

13th Air Service Group
864th Bombardment Squadron
865th Bombardment Squadron
866th Bombardment Squadron
867th Bombardment Squadron

319th Bombardment Group

514th Air Service Group
514th Bombardment Squadron
437th Bombardment Squadron
438th Bombardment Squadron
439th Bombardment Squadron
440th Bombardment Squadron

11th Bombardment Group

13th Air Service Group
57th Bombardment Squadron
26th Bombardment Squadron
42nd Bombardment Squadron
98th Bombardment Squadron
431st Bombardment Squadron

- Air Support Control Unit (Task Unit 99.2.5)

Landing Force Air Support Control Unit 1 (Col Kenneth H. Weir / Col Avery R. Kier)
Landing Force Air Support Control Unit 2 (Col Kenneth D. Kerby / LtCol Etheridge C. Best)
Landing Force Air Support Control Unit 3 (Col Avery R. Kier / Kenneth H. Weir)

== Notable Marines on the TAF, 10th Army staff ==
- Hayne D. Boyden - Wing Chief of Staff
- Paul J. Fontana - Assistant Operations Officer

== See also ==
- Okinawa naval order of battle
