= Air Warning Squadron 8 =

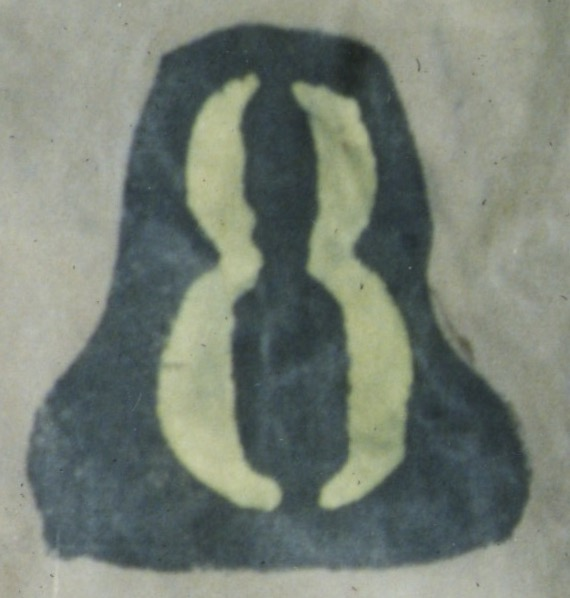
- AWS-8 tac mark on the side of a sea bag. The "warning bell" tac mark was utilized by Marine Corps radar units because of their early warning mission
- Active: 3 Mar 1944 – 12 Mar 1946
- Country: United States
- Branch: United States Marine Corps
- Type: Aviation Command & Control
- Role: Aerial surveillance & early warning
- Nickname: "Arsenic"

Air Warning Squadron 8 (AWS-8) was a United States Marine Corps aviation command and control unit that provided aerial surveillance and early warning of enemy aircraft during World War II. The squadron was commissioned on 3 March 1944 and was one of five Marine Air Warning Squadrons that provided land based radar coverage during the Battle of Okinawa in 1945. AWS-8, utilizing the callsign "Arsenic," remained on Okinawa as part of the garrison force following the Surrender of Japan. The squadron departed Okinawa for the United States in February 1946 and was quickly decommissioned upon its arrival in California. To date, no other Marine Corps squadron has carried the lineage and honors of AWS-8 to include Marine Air Control Squadron 8 (MACS-8).

== Mission ==
To furnish early warning information on approaching air and sea attack and to furnish fighter direction against this attack.

== History ==
=== Formation and training ===
Air Warning Squadron 8 was commissioned at Marine Corps Air Station Cherry Point, North Carolina on 3 March 1944 by the authority of 3d Marine Aircraft Wing General Order #6-1944 released 24 February 1944. On 24 March the majority of the squadron was moved to Marine Corps Air Station Oak Grove near Pollocksville, North Carolina to begin training on the SCR-527 and SCR-602 radars in both day and night problems. Another detachment was sent to Marine Corps Auxiliary Air Field Atlantic to train with the SCR-270 long range radar. The squadron remained at MCAS Oak Grove and Atlantic until 20 April 1944 at which time they returned to MCAS Cherry Point. For the next few days they began preparing the unit for embarkation and on 1 May 1944 they boarded trains headed for the west coast. On 6 May 1944, AWS-8 arrived at Marine Corps Air Station Miramar, California just outside of San Diego. The majority of the squadron took part in intense physical training during May while the squadron technicians drew and inspected the radar equipment that they would need for training. From 24–27 May the squadron conducted landing exercises from the amphibious training ship USS Hunter Liggett (APA-14). AWS-8 remained at Miramar until 5 June 1944 when they convoyed out to Marine Corps Air Station Mojave, California. During their six months in the vicinity of MCAS Mojave, AWS-8 deployed its radars to numerous outlying posts which would simulate their dispersed employment in combat. This training gave unit leadership practical application in communications, supply and operating issues that would occur while in field conditions. During this period they utilized five outlying sites and a control center. They operated the SCR-270, SCR-527 and SCR-602 during this time while training at MCAS Mojave. They worked both day and night problems and in October and November 1944 were able to work numerous night interceptions with the arrival of VMF(N)-543.

On 25 November 1944 the squadron was moved by train back to MCAS Miramar to await follow on movement overseas. On 3 January 1945 the majority of AWS-8 was embarked upon the USS Natrona (APA-214) at Naval Station San Diego. A small detachment of 11 men and the unit's communication gear departed the next day on the USS Allendale (APA-127). They sailed for Pearl Harbor, Territory of Hawaii arriving on 9 January 1945 and quickly thereafter set up camp at Marine Corps Air Station Ewa. A few days later on 14 January a small group of Marines from AWS-8 debarked from the USS Freestone (APA-167) with two newly acquired SP-1M ground control intercept radars and a TPS-1B long range radar. This detachment had been in North Carolina receiving training on this newly acquired radar however they did not have time to train on or calibrate these while at MCAS Ewa.

As preparations for combat continued, leadership was informed that the squadron and its various radars would be employed as independent "Operations" which would travel separately via different ships to support the Okinawa campaign. Operation "A" was composed of an SCR-270 (nicknamed Edna) & SCR-602 ( nicknamed Alice) while Operation "B" was a combination of the SP-1M and TPS-1B radars. Operation "K" handled the squadron's communication gear while the men of Operation "M" operated the SCR-527. The remainder of the squadron which consisted of what typically is Headquarters and Service Company were formed into Operation "P." The squadron also formed three early warning teams (EWTs) whose role was to monitor air warning nets and provide air warning information to front line units during the upcoming battle. EWT-1 was tasked to support the 7th Infantry Division, EWT-2 would support 96th Infantry Division and EWT-3 would attach to Signal Battalion, III Marine Amphibious Corps.

=== Battle of Okinawa ===
==== Landings ====
The men of AWS-8's Operation "A" were among the first forces ashore during the Battle of Okinawa. They landed with the 77th Infantry Division to secure Zamami Shima on 27 March 1945. They immediately began setting up their radars on high terrain and had the SCR-602 in action before assault troops landed on Okinawa on 1 April. A few days later the SCR-270 came online with both radars reporting to the US Navy's Fighter Control Director. The men of the squadron's Operation "B" SP-1M/TPS-1B radar team were sent ashore on 31 March at Nagunnu Shima west of Okinawa. The TPS-1B was operational by 1 April while the SP-1M came on line 4 April. The inability to calibrate the radar at MCAS Ewa prior to embarkation would be the driver of many of the early issues encountered with the new radar. The squadron's early warning teams (EWT) came ashore during the first few days of the battle. EWT-1 supported the 7th Infantry Division while also working closely with the 504th AAA Battalion until 22 April when they linked up with AWS-8's main body at Yontan Airfield. EWT-2 supported the III Amphibious Corps which was tasked with securing the northern end of Okinawa. As the III Amphibious Corps pushed south to join the fighting in the vicinity of Shuri Castle, EWT-2 remained in support until 24 June. EWT #3 supported the 96th Infantry Division until 19 April when they were released from duty and also sent back to Yontan Airfield. Operation "M" with its SCR-527 radar came ashore midday on 3 April at Beach Yellow Three which was located on the north side of the mouth of the Bishi River. The final portion of the squadron, which consisted of the Headquarters and Services Marines from Operation "P", landed at Beach Red One on 6 April and established the squadron's Combat Information Center at Yontan Airfield.

==== Operations ====
The squadron suffered its first casualties on 3 April when a work crew, from Operation "A" on Zamami Shima, which was improving a radar position came under Japanese machine gun fire. This led to one Marine being wounded in action. 6 April would mark the beginning of Operation Kikusui for the Japanese which saw them launch hundreds of aircraft at the Okinawa anchorage. Within these large strike packages were hundreds of kamikaze aircraft that inflicted heavy damage on the Allied Fleet. The kamikaze aircraft specifically targeted the US Navy's Radar picket ships during these raids sinking 10 and damaging 32 during the course of the battle. Because of this, land based radar coverage provided by units such as AWS-8 became even more critical. On 16 May, Japanese infiltrators started a fire in the area where fuel for the SCR-270 on Zamami was being stored. It quickly spread and in the resulting chaos and follow on small arms fire three Marines from the squadron were killed in action with another twenty six Marines receiving burns. The day after the incident, Tokyo Rose took credit for the conflagration on behalf of the Japanese infiltrators.

On 20 April, the SCR-527 and SCR-602 from Operation "M" that were ashore on mainland Okinawa were moved to Ie Shima and co-located with another SCR-527 from Air Warning Squadron 1 (AWS-1). These radars were subject to almost daily air raids during the course of the battle. The AWS-8 SCR-527 crew (callsign "Arsenic") began controlling night intercepts on 26 April. By the time the war had ended this crew had directed 21 successful night interceptions. This was the most night interceptions of any radar crew during the Battle of Okinawa. Of note, six of the night interceptions were controlled by First Lieutenant Hugh Gallarneau who had been an All-American halfback for the 1940 Stanford University national championship winning football team and also played a few years with the Chicago Bears.

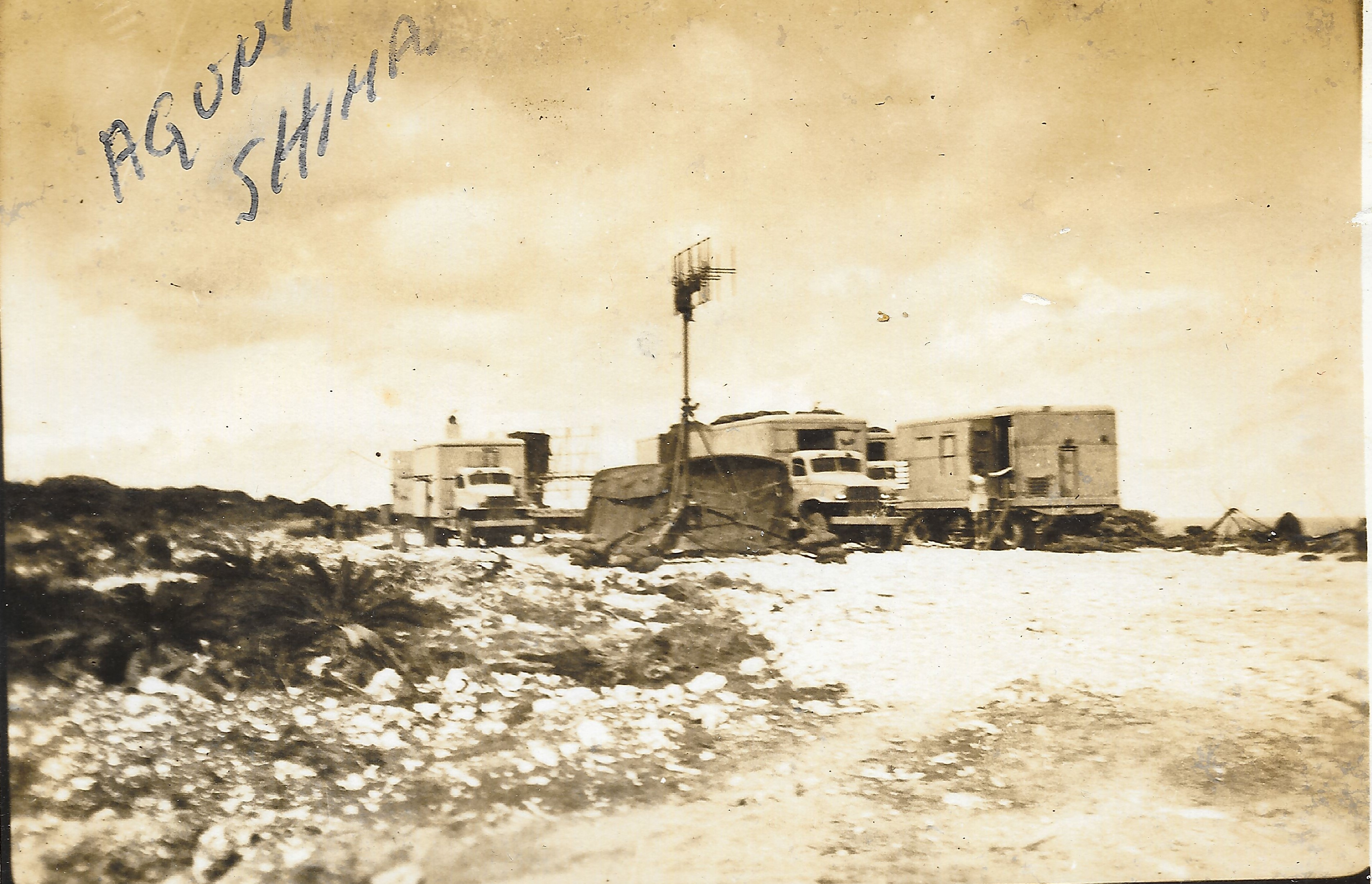
AWS-8 radar vans on Aguni Shima in July 1945

On 2 June the squadron displaced from Yontan Airfield and moved its headquarters to Zamami Shima. 22 June would see a lot of movement for AWS-8. The SCR-527 which had been operating from Ie Shima was moved again, this time to Aguni Shima. That same day, the squadron also moved an SCR-270 and TPS-1B to the southernmost point of Okinawa referred to as "Point Dog." On 15 August 1945 news of the surrender of Japan travelled fast to the combat forces on Okinawa but AWS-8 would still have one more intercept left before the war ended for them. At approximately 1630 on 15 August, AWS-8 radars began tracking the final hostile aircraft of the Second World War. Despite the Emperoro Hirohito's surrender proclamation, Admiral Matome Ugaki led an eleven plane kamikaze flight bound for the Ryukyu Islands. AWS-8 controllers directed their F4U Corsair combat air patrol (CAP) aircraft against the incoming bogeys. None of the Japanese aircraft from the Ugaki raid were able to successfully engage any Allied targets.

=== Post War and demobilization ===
At the end of the war AWS-8 maintained detachments at Zamami and Point Dog providing aerial surveillance and direction finding within their assigned sectors. On 8 & 9 October 1945 the squadron weathered Typhoon Louise which caused immense destruction at both sites. In the later half of October 1945, the detachment on Zamami departed and the squadron was consolidated at Point Dog. This marked the first time the squadron was together in one location since they had departed MCAS Ewa, Hawaii in February. As the Marine Corps instituted the point system to determine when Marines would return home the squadron saw its number steadily decrease beginning in October 1945. On 14 February 1946 the remaining 151 members of the squadron embarked on the USS Guilford (APA-112) headed for a home. AWS-8 arrived in San Diego at 1600 on 6 March 1946. The following day they received a Naval correspondence, Serial #9963-46 dated 6 March 1946 from the Commanding General of the 2nd Marine Aircraft Wing directing the decommissioning of the squadron. On 12 March 1946 Air Warning Squadron 8 was decommissioned.

== Commanding officers ==
- Capt Frank B. Freese (3 March 1944 – 1 July 1945)
- Capt Robert O. Caulkins (2 July 1945 – 9 October 1945)
- Capt John F. Wilson (10 October 1945 – 8 November 1945) (Premier GCI controller in the Marine Corps during World War II with 28 intercepts to his credit)
- Capt Frank D. Casserly (9 November 1945 – 12 March 1946)

== Notable former members ==
- John Petercuskie - noted football coach.
- Ernie Johnson - later the "Voice of the Braves."
- Hugh Gallarneau - All-American halfback at Stanford University and played for the Chicago Bears.

== Unit awards ==
A unit citation or commendation is an award bestowed upon an organization for the action cited. Members of the unit who participated in said actions are allowed to wear on their uniforms the awarded unit citation. AWS-8 was presented with the following awards:

Streamer	Award	Year(s)	Additional Info
	Presidential Unit Citation Streamer	9 April - 14 July 1945	Okinawa
	Asiatic-Pacific Campaign Streamer with one Bronze Star		Okinawa
	World War II Victory Streamer	1941–1945	Pacific War

== See also ==
- Aviation combat element
- United States Marine Corps Aviation
- List of United States Marine Corps aviation support squadrons
