= Robert O. Bisson =

United States Marine Corps general (1908–1959)

Robert Omer Bisson
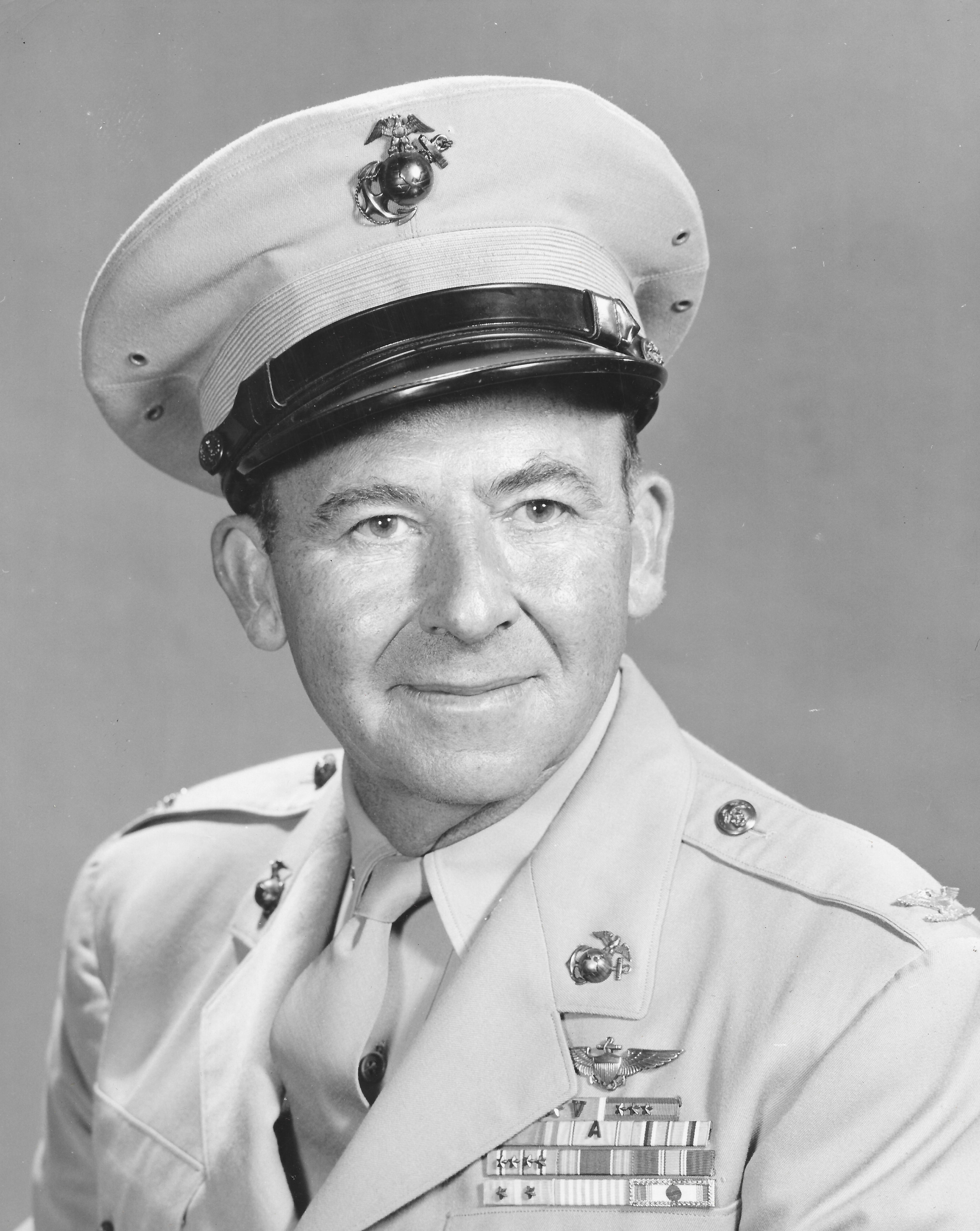
- Born: September 8, 1908; Abingdon, Illinois, US
- Died: March 19, 1959 (aged 50); Solvang, California, US
- Burial place: Arlington National Cemetery
- Military career
- Allegiance: United States
- Branch: United States Marine Corps
- Service years: 1932–1958
- Rank: Brigadier general
- Commands: Marine Aircraft Group 13; Marine Air Control Group 1 Marine Aircraft Group 43; 2nd Marine Air Warning Group
- Conflicts: World War II: Solomon Islands campaign; Battle of Okinawa; Korean War
- Awards: Legion of Merit w/ V

Robert Omer Bisson (8 September 1908 – 19 March 1959) was a brigadier general in the United States Marine Corps who served in both World War II and the Korean War. A naval aviator and communications engineer, he was at the forefront of the Marine Corps' use of radar for early warning and fighter direction. In 1943, as a member of VMF(N)-531, he supervised the installation and operation of the Marine Corps' first ground-controlled interception (GCI) equipment utilized in a combat zone. During the Battle of Okinawa he commanded the headquarters responsible for coordinating the Marine Corps' ground-based air defense units.

After the war he commanded Marine Air Control Group 1 and Marine Aircraft Group 13 and also served with the 1st Marine Aircraft Wing during the Korean War. His last assignment was as the commanding officer of Marine Corps Air Station Miami, Florida. BGen Bisson's last day on active duty was 31 December 1958. He died from a heart attack a little less than three months later on 19 March 1959 in Solvang, California.

== Early years ==
Bisson was born in Abingdon, Illinois, on 8 September 1908. He graduated from high school in 1927 and attended the University of Illinois for one year prior to entering the United States Naval Academy in 1928. He graduated on 6 June 1932 and was commissioned a second lieutenant in the United States Marine Corps that same day.

== Pre-war Marine Corps service ==
From July 1932 until June 1933 he attended the Marine Officer's Basic Course. In July 1933 he began his first assignment with the Marine Detachment on board the USS Oklahoma (BB-37). In July 1934 he transferred to the Marine barracks at Mare Island Naval Shipyard in Vallejo, California. His first assignment with the Fleet Marine Force began in October 1934 when he was assigned to 1st Battalion, 6th Marines at the Marine Corps Base in San Diego, California.

Capt Bisson was selected to transition to aviation and in June 1936 he reported to Naval Air Station Pensacola, Florida. He graduated flight training becoming a naval aviator on 27 July 1937. His first duty station as part of Marine Aviation was at Naval Air Station North Island in Coronado, California. In May 1940 he was transferred to the 1st Marine Aircraft Wing (1st MAW) based at Marine Corps Air Facility Quantico, Virginia, and assigned to Marine Observation Squadron 1 (VMO-1) which was later re-designated VMO-151. From February – August 1942 he attended the United States Army's Signal Corps School at Fort Monmouth, New Jersey. Here he received instruction on the new technology of radar. Additional schooling was received at the Electronics Specialist Course given at Harvard University and the Massachusetts Institute of Technology from August 1942 until February 1943.

== World War II ==
From February to August 1942 he attended the United States Army's Signal Corps School at Fort Monmouth, New Jersey. Here he received instruction on the new technology of radar. Additional schooling was received at the Electronics Specialist Course given at Harvard University and the Massachusetts Institute of Technology from August 1942 until February 1943. Upon graduation he joined the newly formed Marine Night Fighter Squadron 531 (VMF(N)-531) at Marine Corps Air Station Cherry Point, North Carolina as the officer in charge of their Ground Controlled Intercept detachment. In March 1943, Bisson and 4 enlisted men were sent on temporary duty to General Electric in Syracuse, New York, to receive instruction on the SCR-527 early warning radar. Newly promoted to lieutenant colonel, Bisson and his small radar detachment departed for San Diego on 15 May. At the end of May they set up their GCI equipment near Marine Corps Air Station El Centro, California in order for the squadron to train a bit more prior to deployment. They departed San Diego on 30 July on board the USS Hammondsport (APV-2) arriving at Espiritu Santo on 28 August. The GCI equipment was initially sited at Liapari Point on 18 October however on 25 October it was moved to Pakoi Bay because of operational necessity. From this position they were able to provide early warning and fighter direction coverage for the Navy task forces that were sailing towards Bougainville and Choiseul Island. During this deployment Bisson and his men established radar sites near the coast because the dense foliage of the jungle and uneven terrain were less than ideal for radar operations. They were able to calibrate the SCR-527 for overwater detection including variances for changes in tides. They were also able to keep the gear running despite the problems posed by humidity in the Pacific. Bisson returned from overseas duty in December 1943. On 8 February 1944 he took command of Marine Air Warning Group 2 (MAWG-2) at Marine Corps Air Station Miramar, California. MAWG-2 was responsible for final training and equipping of Marine Corps Air Warning squadrons prior to their deployment overseas. He remained as the group commander until 26 December 1944. On 1 February he took command of Marine Aircraft Group 43 (MAG-43) at Marine Corps Air Station Ewa, Hawaii as they were in the final stages of preparation for the assault on Okinawa. For the upcoming battle, the 2nd Marine Aircraft Wing (2d MAW) had been identified as the headquarters for the Tactical Air Force, Tenth Army (TAF) overseeing all land-based aircraft during the battle. Bisson's MAG-43 was subordinate to 2d MAW's headquarters and was the administrative headquarters for all members of the TAF's Air Defense Command (ADC) which had BGen William J. Wallace in command.

Bisson departed Pearl Harbor on 22 February 1945 on board the USS Allendale. He went ashore on 2 April with BGen Wallace to reconnoiter a position for the ADC's headquarters. The headquarters was established about a half a mile southeast of Yontan Airfield in what is today the village of Yomitan. On 20 July he was promoted to full colonel. Col Bisson remained in command of MAG-43 until 4 August. He departed for MCAS Miramar the next day.

== Post-war billets ==
On 25 September 1945 LtCol Bisson took command of Marine Air Control Group 1 at Marine Corps Air Station Cherry Point, North Carolina. He stayed in this role until the summer of 1948. On 20 August 1948 he checked into the Armed Forces Staff College at Naval Support Activity Hampton Roads in Norfolk, Virginia. Upon graduation he was assigned as the Assistant Chief of Staff, G-1 for Marine Air Reserve Training Command out of Naval Air Station Glenview, Illinois.

From the summer of 1953 through 2 June 1954 he served as the Commanding Officer of Marine Aircraft Group 13 at Marine Corps Air Station Kaneohe Bay, Hawaii

In 1955, after graduating from the United States Army War College he was assigned back to NAS Glenview as the Chief of Staff of the Marine Air Reserve Training Command. In July 1957 he began his final assignment in the Marine Corps as the Commanding Officer of Marine Corps Air Station Miami, Florida.

== Retirement, death, and legacy ==
Robert Bisson was advanced to brigadier general at retirement for having been commended for heroism in combat. Three months after his official retirement from the Marine Corps, BGen Bisson died from a heart attack in Solvang, California. He was survived by his wife Margaret and two daughters, Margaret and Barbara. BGen Bisson is buried in Arlington National Cemetery in Arlington, Virginia.

== Medals and decorations ==
Here is the ribbon bar of Brigadier General Robert O. Bisson:

=== Legion of Merit citation ===
The President of the United States of America takes pleasure in presenting the Legion of Merit with Combat "V" to Lieutenant Colonel Robert Omer Bisson (MCSN: 0-4754), United States Marine Corps, for exceptionally meritorious conduct in the performance of outstanding services to the Government of the United States while commanding a Marine Aircraft Group on Okinawa Shima, Ryukyu Islands, from 25 March to 10 June 1945. Lieutenant Colonel Bisson, by his high degree of professional and technical skill and his unceasing devotion to duty, succeeded in establishing, operating and maintaining an air defense control center and four air warning squadrons in a most efficient manner. He accomplished this despite natural difficulties, shortage of material and personnel, and numerous enemy air attacks. In addition, he also acted as radar officer for the Tactical Air Force and as staff radar advisor for the TENTH Army. The success of all aviation radar activities on Okinawa, as well as fighter direction stations, was in a great measure, the result of his careful planning and professional skill. His highly commendable performance of duty contributed materially to the success of a most difficult operation, and his conduct throughout was in keeping with the highest traditions of the United States Naval Service. (Lieutenant Colonel Bisson is authorized to wear the Combat "V".)
