= VMAQT-1 =

Marine Tactical Electronic Warfare Training Squadron 1
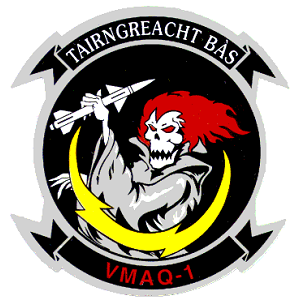
- VMAQ-1 insignia
- Active: 1 July 1992 - 29 April 2016
- Country: United States of America
- Branch: United States Marine Corps
- Type: Attack
- Role: Electronic Warfare
- Part of: Marine Aircraft Group 14; 2nd Marine Aircraft Wing
- Garrison/HQ: Marine Corps Air Station Cherry Point
- Nickname: Banshee
- Mottos: "Tairngreacht Bas" "Death Foretold"
- Tail Code: CB
- Engagements: Korean War; Vietnam War; Operation Desert Storm; Operation Northern Watch; Operation Southern Watch; Operation Allied Force; Operation Iraqi Freedom; Operation Enduring Freedom

Commanders
- Commanding Officer: LtCol. William A Schutz
- Executive Officer: Maj. Mark B. Weinrich
- Sergeant Major: SgtMaj. Jay D. Williamson

Aircraft flown
- Attack: AD-4 Skyraider
- Electronic warfare: EA-6B Prowler; EA-6A Electric Intruder; EF-10B Skynights
- Fighter: RF-8A Crusaders; RF-4B Phantom II’s

Marine Tactical Electronic Warfare Training Squadron 1 (VMAQT-1) was a United States Marine Corps electronic warfare training squadron consisting of EA-6B Prowler jets. The squadron was based at Marine Corps Air Station Cherry Point, North Carolina and fell under the command of Marine Aircraft Group 14 (MAG-14) and the 2nd Marine Aircraft Wing (2nd MAW). The VMAQT-1 logo was the Banshee, an Irish mythological figure foretelling death. Its motto was "Tairngreacht Bas," Gaelic for "Death Foretold."

== Mission ==
Conduct airborne electronic warfare in support of Fleet Marine Force operations or other units as the Joint Force Commander directs. This includes suppressing enemy radar and surface-to-air missiles utilizing electronic jamming and High-Speed Anti-Radiation (HARM) missiles, as well as collecting tactical electronic intelligence in a passive electronic support role.

== History ==
=== Korean War ===
Marine Composite Squadron One (VMC-1) was activated on 15 September 1952, at K-3 Air Base, South Korea as part of Marine Air Control Group 2, 1st Marine Aircraft Wing (1st MAW). Its mission was to conduct airborne early warning and electronic countermeasures in support of combat operations. On 16 June 1953, a United States Marine Corps AD-4 Skyraider from VMC-1 piloted by Major George H. Linnemeier and CWO Vernon S. Kramer shot down a Soviet-built Polikarpov Po-2 biplane, the only documented Skyraider air victory of the war. The squadron continued support in defense of the Korean Demilitarized Zone through March 1955. Following the Korean War, VMC-1 was redeployed to MCAS Kaneohe Bay, Hawaii, and re-designated as VMCJ-1 after merging with Marine Photographic Squadron One (VMJ-1).

=== Vietnam War ===
Throughout the 1960s and early 1970s, VMCJ-1 saw extensive service during the Vietnam War. From 14 April 1964, to 16 December 1965, the squadron flew its RF-8A Crusaders in photoreconnaissance missions from the USS Ticonderoga, USS Constellation, USS Coral Sea and the USS Oriskany. In April 1965, VMCJ-1 took its EF-10B aircraft from Marine Corps Air Station Iwakuni, Japan and joined Marine Aircraft Group 16 at Da Nang Air Base to combat the increase of surface-to-air missiles in Vietnam. In July of that same year, six VMCJ-1 EF-10B Skynights supported the first strike against a surface-to-air missile site in history. In November 1966, the Grumman EA-6A Electric Intruder was introduced at Danang and flew combat missions as far north as Hanoi and Haiphong and eventually phased out the EF-10Bs. VMCJ-1 retired its RF-8A Crusaders and received RF-4B Phantom II's to accomplish the photoreconnaissance mission. Again VMCJ-1 carried out a major portion of the area reconnaissance and electronic warfare missions for USMACV, just as it did for 5th AF in the Korean War with its photographic reconnaissance. VMCJ-1 provided escort for B-52s, support for tactical air strikes, and collection of all forms of electronic intelligence. On the photorecon side, VMCJ-1 was operating in a science which had become much more sophisticated and was now called "imagery intelligence."

After the withdrawal of troops from Vietnam, VMCJ-1 was again flying missions from Navy aircraft carriers. From 11 September 1973, to 31 December 1975, VMCJ-1 and VMCJ-1 Det 101 conducted missions from the USS Midway.

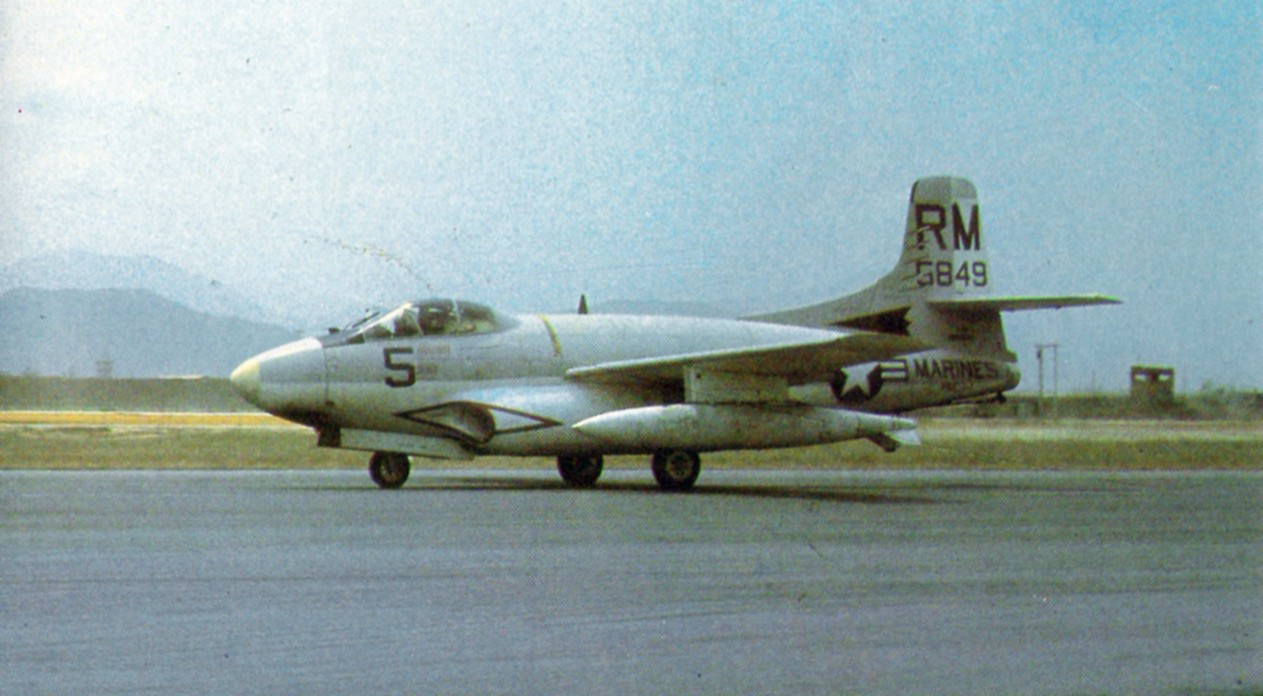
EF-10B Skyknight of VMCJ-1

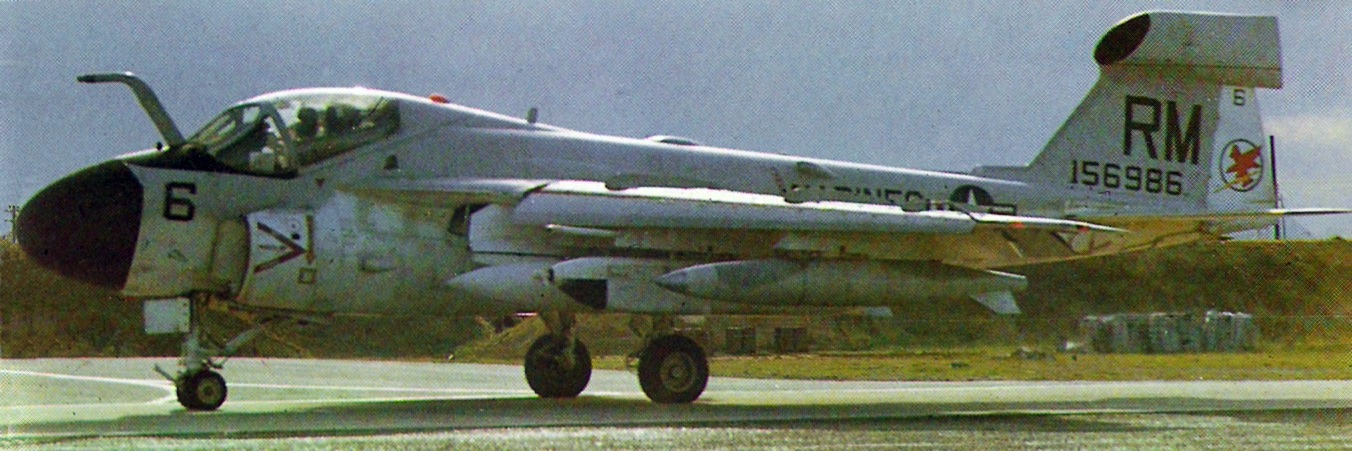
An EA-6A Intruder of VMCJ-1 at Da Nang Air Base, 1970

=== Post Vietnam & the 1980s ===
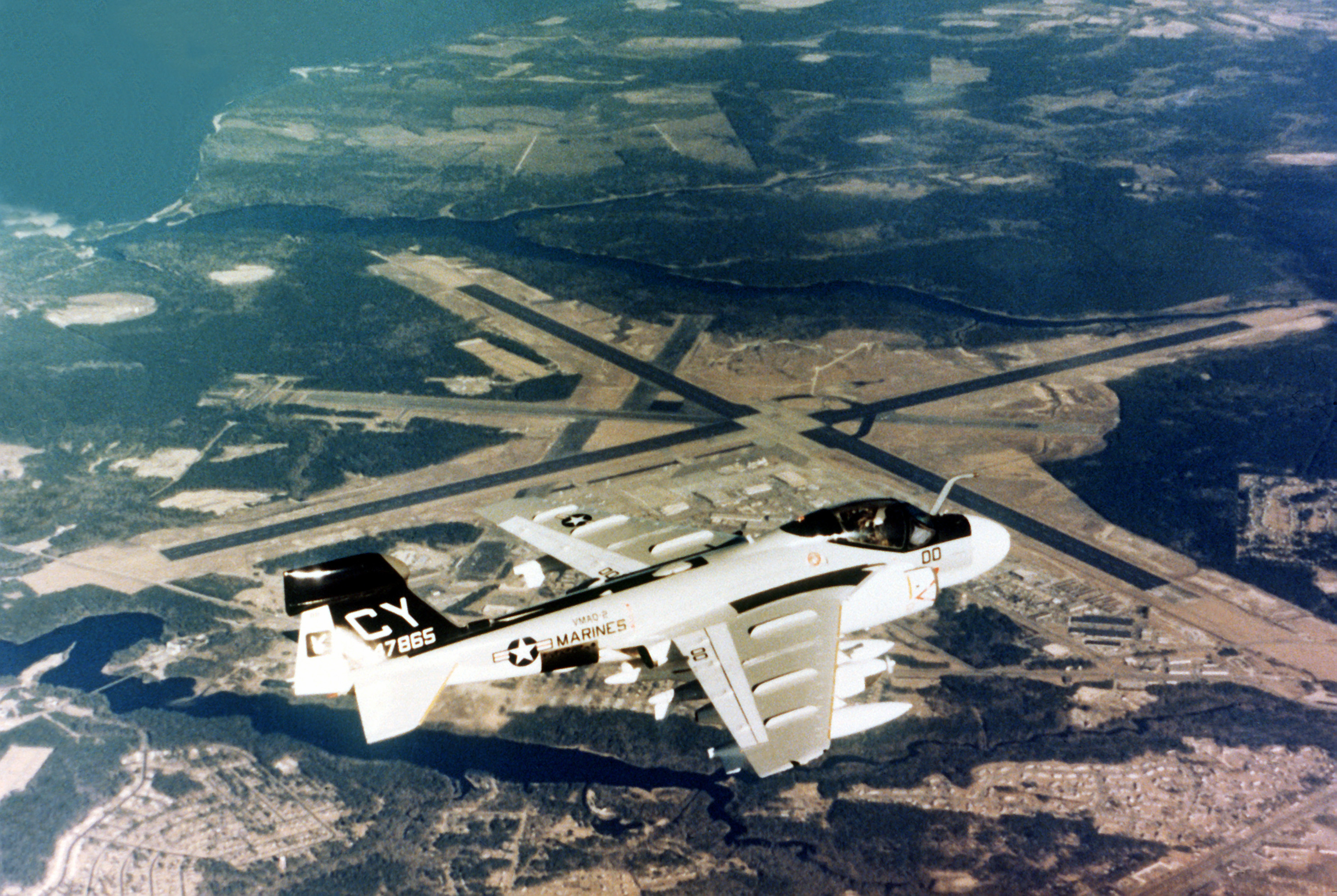
EA-6A Intruder of VMAQ-2

After Vietnam, the composite community was again reorganized and split into Marine Tactical Electronic Warfare Squadron Two (VMAQ-2) and Marine Photo-Reconnaissance Squadron Three (VMFP-3). Personnel and aircraft from each of the VMCJ's were divided and re-designated as detachments Alpha through Charlie within the larger VMAQ-2/VMFP-3 squadrons. VMAQ-2, Detachment A, flying the EA-6A, rotated with its sister detachments in support of the USS Midway Carrier Air Wing conducting operations from the Gulf of Tonkin to Korea.

Now flying the EA-6B, detachment A was renamed detachment X. During Operation Desert Shield/Desert Storm, detachment X-ray was called upon to extend its normal six-month rotation to thirteen months in order to maintain a watch over the Western Pacific.

Following Operation Desert Storm, the criticality and shortage of electronic attack assets was finally recognized. The decision was made to reorganize back to the original three electronic warfare squadrons. In addition, a fourth squadron was gained by activating the reserve Marine Tactical Electronic Warfare Squadron Four (VMAQ-4). While deployed to MCAS Iwakuni, Japan, VMAQ-2 detachment X-ray was re-commissioned as Marine Tactical Electronic Warfare Squadron 1 on 1 July 1992, with the mission to conduct electronic warfare in support of Marine Forces and Joint/Combined operations.

=== The 1990s ===
- September 1995, VMAQ-1 deployed to Aviano Air Base, Italy for six months supporting Operations Deny Flight and Decisive Endeavor over Bosnia-Herzegovina until March 1996.
- July 1997, VMAQ-1 established the first six-month EA-6B deployment to Incirlik Air Base in support of Operation Northern Watch (ONW) flying over 1,000 hours and 200 combat sorties.
- December 1998, VMAQ-1 again deployed to Incirlik Airbase in support of ONW for seven months flying over 1,100 hours and 236 combat sorties. While deployed, VMAQ-1 was called upon to re-deploy to Aviano Airbase to reinforce VMAQ-2 in support of Operation Allied Force.
- September 2000, VMAQ-1, deployed to Prince Sultan Airbase, Saudi Arabia in support of Operation Southern Watch (OSW) as part of the overall Joint EA-6B deployment schedule.
- August 2001, VMAQ-1 deployed to Incirlik Airbase in support of Operation Northern Watch. The squadron logged over 530 hours and 160 combat sorties. During this time VMAQ-1 supported several strikes on Iraqi air defense sites.
- May 2002, VMAQ-1 deployed to Prince Sultan Airbase, Saudi Arabia in support of Operation Southern Watch (OSW) as part of the overall Joint EA-6B deployment schedule.

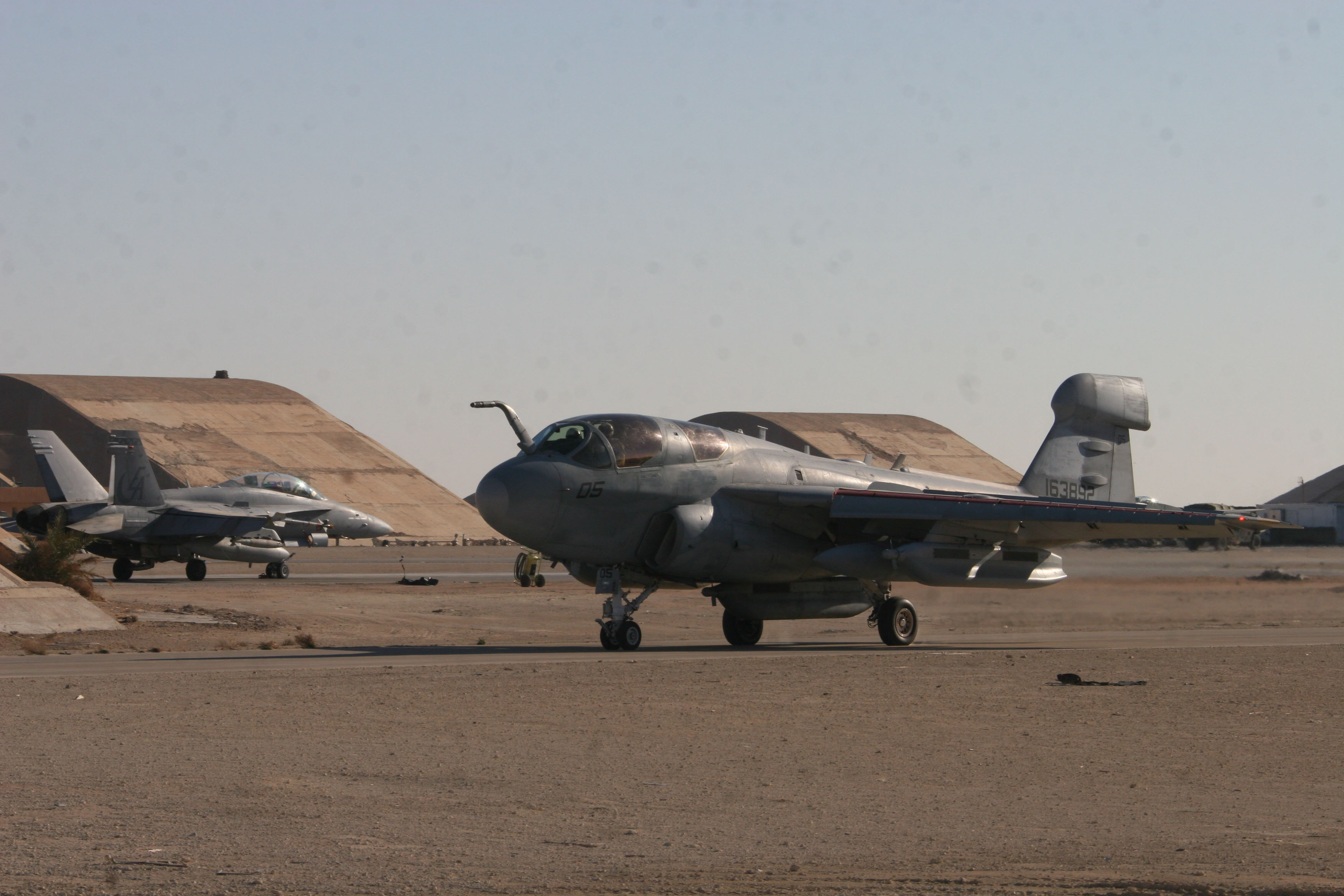
VMAQ-1 Prowler on the tarmac at Al Asad Air station in Western Iraq in January 2006

- April 2004, VMAQ-1 deployed to MCAS Iwakuni, Japan.

=== Global War on Terror ===
- February 2003, VMAQ-1 deployed to Prince Sultan Air Base to support Operation Southern Watch and shortly after arrival, to support Operation Iraqi Freedom. In seven weeks the squadron's aircrew and aircraft flew 1129 combat hours and 197 combat sorties.
- The squadron again deployed to Al Asad, Iraq in August 2005 as part of II MEF to provide nonkinetic firepower to protect Marines and Soldiers on the ground. The Prowler attacks by disrupting communications or disabling the enemy's capabilities using specialized equipment on board. During this deployment they flew over 800 combat missions, racked up more than 3000 combat flight hours and their maintenance crews provided more than 41,000 maintenance hours. The squadron returned to MCAS Cherry Point by early February 2006.
- The squadron again deployed to Al Asad Air Base, Iraq in January 2007.
- The squadron deployed to Al Asad Air Base again in July 2008
- The squadron then deployed to Bagram Airfield, Afghanistan for the first time in September 2009.
- The Squadron deployed to Aviano AB, Italy in support of NATO Operation Unified Protector in Libya in 2011. The squadron then re-deployed to Bagram Airfield, Afghanistan in support of Operation Enduring Freedom in November 2011.

=== Training squadron ===
In 2013 VMAQ-1 was redesignated a training squadron to support Prowler operations until 2016.

== Unit awards ==
A unit citation or commendation is an award bestowed upon an organization for the action cited. Members of the unit who participated in said actions are allowed to wear on their uniforms the awarded unit citation. VMAQ-1 has been presented with the following awards:

Ribbon	Unit Award
	Presidential Unit Citation
	Navy Unit Commendation with 3 Bronze Stars
	Meritorious Unit Commendation
	National Defense Service Medal with 3 Bronze Stars
	Korean Service Medal with 2 Bronze Stars
	Vietnam Service Medal with 2 Silver and 3 Bronze Stars
	Korean Presidential unit Citation
	Vietnam Cross of Gallantry with Palm Streamer
	Vietnam Meritorious Unit Citation Civil Action Medal
	Iraq Campaign Medal
	Global War on Terrorism Expeditionary Medal
	Global War on Terrorism Service Medal

=== Other awards ===
- Marine Corps Aviation Association "Squadron of the Year": 1995, 1998, 2002, 2003, 2004, 2006, 2008, and 2010.
- II MEF CG "Chesty Puller Award" for Outstanding Leadership: 2006 (both 1st and 2nd half FY06).
- Association of Old Crows "Outstanding Unit": 1994, 2002, 2006, 2008 and 2010.
- Chief of Naval Operations Aviation Safety Award: 1995, 2002, 2006, 2008, and 2010.

== See also ==
- List of United States Marine Corps aircraft squadrons
- United States Marine Corps Aviation
- List of decommissioned United States Marine Corps aircraft squadrons
