= Air Warning Squadron 6 =

US Marine Corps unit

- Active: 1 Jan 1944 – 26 Feb 1946
- Country: United States
- Allegiance: United States of America
- Branch: United States Marine Corps
- Type: Aviation Command & Control
- Role: Aerial surveillance & early warning
- Engagements: Battle of Okinawa

Commanders
- Current commander: Capt Clarence C. Gordon

Air Warning Squadron 6 (AWS-6) was a United States Marine Corps aviation command and control unit that provided aerial surveillance and early warning of enemy aircraft during World War II. The squadron was activated on 1 January 1944 and was one of five Marine Air Warning Squadrons that provided land based radar coverage during the Battle of Okinawa in 1945. AWS-6 remained on Okinawa as part of the garrison force following the Surrender of Japan. The squadron departed Okinawa for the United States in February 1946 and was quickly decommissioned upon its arrival in California. To date, no other Marine Corps squadron has carried the lineage and honors of AWS-6 to include Marine Air Control Squadron 6 (MACS-6).

== Mission ==
Furnish, in combat and danger zones, early warning through long range search radar to friendly units; ground controlled interception of enemy planes by friendly planes; receive, evaluate, coordinate and disseminate through an Air Defense Control Center information on air and surface craft to all activities concerned.

== Equipment ==
- SCR-270
- SCR-602
- SCR-527
- AN/TTQ-1

== History ==
Air Warning Squadron 6 was commissioned on 1 January 1944, at Marine Corps Air Station Cherry Point, North Carolina, on the authority of 3d Marine Aircraft Wing General Order #36-1943. After commissioning, the squadron immediately moved personnel and equipment to Marine Corps Outlying Field Oak Grove and Marine Corps Outlying Field Atlantic to begin training on available radar equipment. On 16 February the squadron was ordered to prepare for movement to the West Coast no later than 1 March 1944. The squadron returned to MCAS Cherry Point on 19 February 1944, to begin preparations.

The squadron departed North Carolina via train on 1 March 1944, arriving in San Diego on 7 March. The squadron based at Marine Corps Air Depot Miramar, California, under the command of Marine Air Warning Group 2 (MAWG-2). 9 March saw the squadron draw their gear after which they immediately began to test and train. On 20 March 1944, AWS-6 and VMF-323 moved north to the air station at Marine Corps Base Camp Pendleton. April saw men from the squadron take part in numerous amphibious landing exercises with the 5th Marine Division and Air Warning Squadron (Air Transportable)-10. On 19 April the squadron returned to MCAD Miramar and began preparing to deploy overseas in May.

The squadron's overseas deployment order was rescinded in May 1944 and the squadron immediately returned to training. I n may they set up near Miramar and worked with United States Navy units to include VB-117, VC-21 and VC-75. They returned to Camp Pendleton in July to take part in another round of amphibious exercises in the area of Aliso Canyon. The squadron continued to train in and around San Diego until mid-October 1944 when they moved to Marine Corps Air Station El Centro, California. On 15 November the squadron received orders to immediately prepare to deploy overseas.

AWS-6 departed San Diego on 3 January 1945 arriving at Pearl Harbor on 9 January. They immediately set sail again on 11 January for additional training in Kauai. On 21 February the squadron departed Hawaii continuing through Eniwetok and Ulithi en route to their final destination.

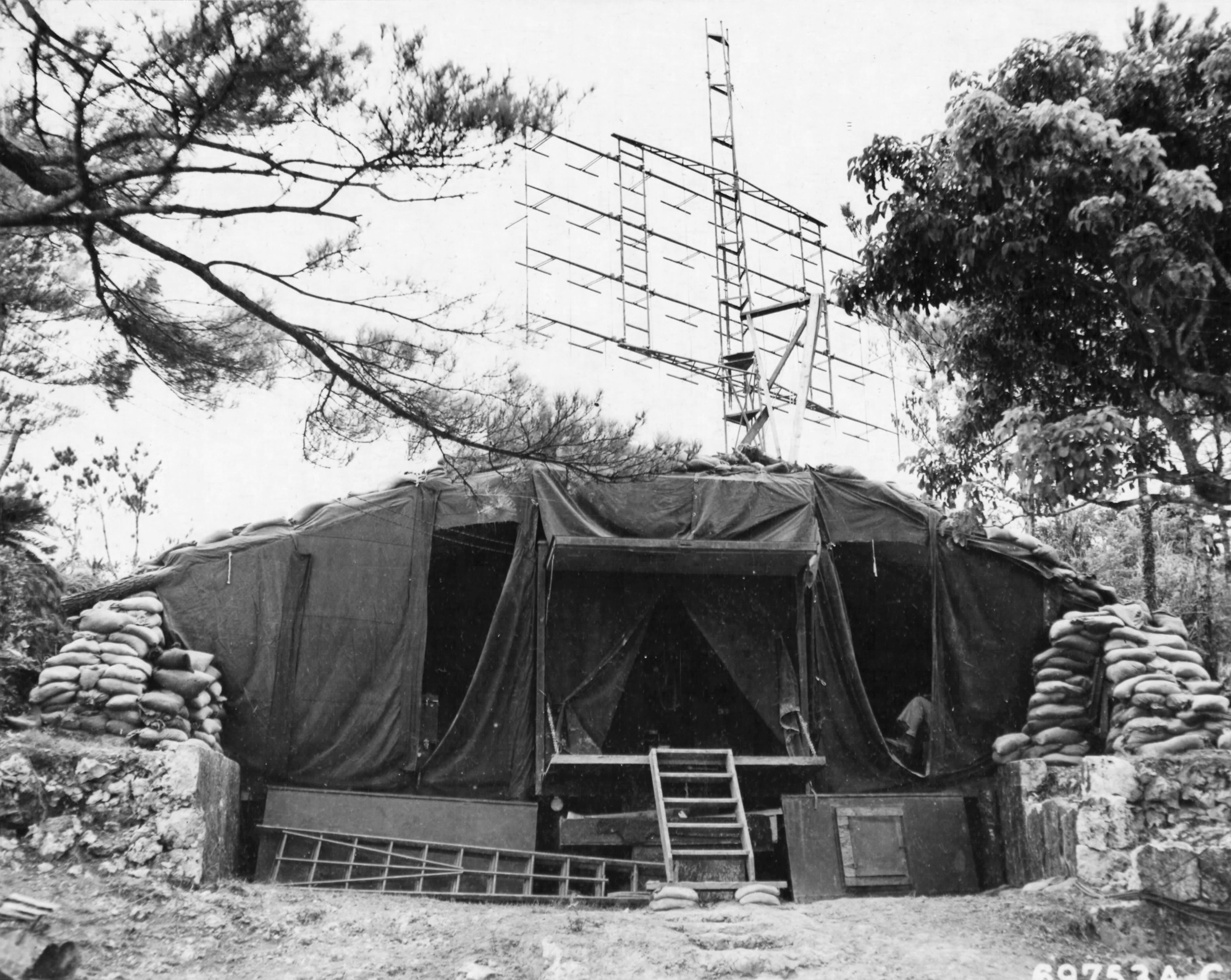
SCR-270 Radar from Air Warning Squadron 6 after the Battle of Okinawa.

On 17 April 1945, AWS-6 came ashore to take part in the Battle of Okinawa. The squadron was tasked to set up on three of the Yokatsu Islands on the eastern side of the island with the squadron headquartered at Ikei Island. They were responsible for providing early warning against Japanese raids against American shipping in Buckner Bay and also for guiding many of the aircraft coming in from Guam and Iwo Jima. The squadron's sub-Air Defense Control Center went live on 10 May and they controlled their first nighttime GCI flight on 14 May. On 25 May 1945, 2 boats with enemy personnel landed in the vicinity of AWS-6's position on Ikei Island. Squadron members engaged the enemy killing five and capturing one. AWS-6 remained on the eastern side of Okinawa throughout the remainder of the war. On 8 & 9 October 1945 the squadron weathered Typhoon Louise which caused immense destruction.

The squadron remained on Okinawa and continued to train until February 1946. On 12 February they departed Okinawa for the United States. The squadron arrived in San Francisco, CA on 26 February 1946. AWS-6 was officially decommissioned on 28 February 1946 by authority of Chief of Naval Operations Dispatch 251925 & Commandant of the Marine Corps Dispatch 291831.

== Unit awards ==
A unit citation or commendation is an award bestowed upon an organization for the action cited. Members of the unit who participated in said actions are allowed to wear on their uniforms the awarded unit citation. What follows is an incomplete list of the awards AWS-6 has been presented with:

| Streamer | Award | Year(s) | Additional Info |
|---|---|---|---|
| | Presidential Unit Citation Streamer | 1945 | Okinawa |
| | American Defense Service Streamer with one Bronze Star | | World War II |
| | Asiatic-Pacific Campaign Streamer with one Bronze Star | | Okinawa |
| | World War II Victory Streamer | 1941–1945 | Pacific War |

== See also ==
- United States Marine Corps Aviation
- List of United States Marine Corps aviation support squadrons
