= Marine Air Support Squadron 2 =

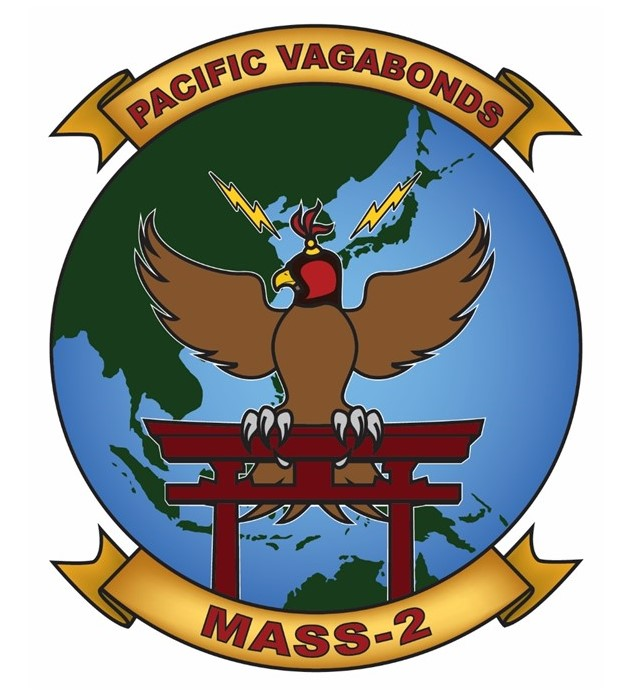
- Active: 1 January 1943 - present
- Country: United States of America
- Branch: United States Marine Corps
- Type: Aviation command and control
- Role: Provide the DASC
- Part of: Marine Air Control Group 18; 1st Marine Aircraft Wing
- Garrison/HQ: Marine Corps Air Station Futenma
- Nickname: "Pacific Vagabonds"
- Anniversaries: 1 January 2018 - 75th Anniversary
- Engagements: World War II; Korean War; Vietnam War; Operation Enduring Freedom

Commanders
- Current commander: LtCol James Lomsdale

Marine Air Support Squadron 2 (MASS-2) is a United States Marine Corps aviation command and control unit that provides the Direct Air Support Center (DASC) for the III Marine Expeditionary Force. It is the oldest and most decorated aviation command and control unit in the Marine Corps.

Originally formed at Marine Corps Air Station El Centro, California on 1 January 1943, the Squadron served as the senior air defense headquarters during the Battle of Okinawa. It was the first aviation command and control unit to arrive in Korea as part of the 1st Provisional Marine Brigade in August 1950 and was part of the last Marine Corps units to leave in July 1956. MASS-2 provided multiple DASCs and Air Support Radar Teams in support of Marine Corps operations in Vietnam from April 1965 until late 1973. The squadron has also sent multiple small detachments to support operations in both Iraq and Afghanistan. Today, the squadron is based out of Marine Corps Air Station Futenma, Okinawa, Japan and continues to regularly deploy in support of exercises and theater security cooperation engagements throughout the Indo-Pacific area of responsibility.

== Mission ==
Provide Direct Air Support Center (DASC) capabilities for control and coordination of aircraft operating in direct support of Marine Air-Ground Task Force (MAGTF) Forces.

== History ==
=== World War II ===
Marine Air Support Squadron 2 was activated 1 January 1943, at Marine Corps Air Station El Centro, California, as Headquarters Squadron 43, Services Group, Marine Wings Pacific. The unit originally functioned as the headquarters element of Marine Aircraft Base Defense Group 43. In November 1944, the Group was assigned to Marine Aircraft Group 43. During the first two years of its existence the Squadron remained in California. With the departure of the Group, however, Headquarters Squadron 43 also moved to Hawaii. While deployed to the territory of Hawaii in January 1945, Headquarters Squadron 43 and Marine Aircraft Group 43 were reassigned to the 2nd Marine Aircraft Wing.

The stay in Hawaii was only of a brief duration, because on 22 February 1945, Headquarters Squadron 43 embarked and sailed on board USS Allendale for the Western Pacific. En route to their destination their convoy stopped at Eniwetok, Babelthaup and the Philippines. Marine Aircraft Group 43 was designated to serve as the headquarters for the Tactical Air Force, Tenth Army for the forthcoming Battle of Okinawa. Its mission was first to occupy Japanese airfields and then to aid in furnishing of aerial defense for ground troops. Upon landing, Headquarters Squadron, MAG-43 assumed responsibility for all land-based air warning and fighter direction facilities within the Air Defense Command.

During the course of the battle the unit was located about one kilometre (0.62 mi) southeast of Yontan Airfield and was subjected to nearly nightly Japanese air raids. Five Marines from the unit were killed and many more wounded on 20 April 1945 when a Japanese plane dropped a bomb on the mess tent. For its service during the battle for the island, the squadron was awarded the Presidential Unit Citation.

On 1 August 1945, Headquarters Squadron 43 was re-designated as Headquarters Squadron, Marine Air Defense Command 2 (MADC-2). The squadron transferred responsibility for the Okinawa area to the 301st Fighter Wing on 1 January 1946 and began preparations to return to the United States. Headquarters Squadron was reassigned in February 1946 to the 4th Marine Aircraft Wing and was reassigned to Air Fleet Marine Force, Pacific. They closed their Okinawa Command Post at 1300 on 29 March 1946 and proceeded to board USS Waukesha for transit home. The squadron arrived back in San Diego on 15 April 1946 and were immediately redesignated as Headquarters Squadron, Marine Air Warning Group 2. On 1 August 1946, the unit was again re-designated as Headquarters Squadron, Marine Air Control Group 2 and relocated to Marine Corps Air Station Santa Ana, California. On 1 July 1947 the squadron was given the name Marine Tactical Air Control Squadron 2 (MTACS-2). Their newly assigned mission was to provide the central control facilities for air defense and air support operations, furnish administrative support to Group Headquarters and operate the special air control equipment assigned.

=== Korean War ===
At the outbreak of the Korean War, MTACS-2 was severely under strength. Additional Marines were joined from other squadrons within Marine Air Control Group 2 to fill out the squadron's ranks prior to deployment. The squadron departed Long Beach Harbor on 14 July 1950 on board USS General A. E. Anderson. They arrived in Kobe, Japan on 1 August 1950, the air defense section unloaded and set up operations at Itami Air Force Base, Honshu, Japan to be co-located with VMF(N)-513. The air support section boarded the Japanese LST Q-109 and sailed for Pusan the next day. After arriving in Pohang on 4 August, the Air Support Section assumed control of all close air support aircraft for 1st Provisional Marine Brigade engaged on the Pusan perimeter. For the Inchon invasion, both sections of MTACS-2 departed their respective locations and headed for the new front. On 17 September, the squadron disembarked at Inchon. That same day, control of close air support passed from the Tactical Air Direction Center aboard USS Mount McKinley to MTACS-2 who was now controlling for all of X Corps. The air support section aided the 1st Marine Division by enabling close air support throughout the battle. The air defense section provided air defense surveillance against possible enemy air intrusion.

When the 1st Marine Division sailed for Wonsan, both the Air Support and Air Defense sections of MTACS-2 sailed with them. Upon arrival at Wonsan, the Air Support section debarked on 26 October 1950, establishing the TADC on Wonsan Airfield, The Air Defense section moved to nearby Hamhung and was joined by the TADC on 6 November 1950. The Air Support section was with the 1st Marine Division from 27 November – 10 December 1950 during the Battle of Chosin Reservoir. They controlled the flow of aircraft in support of the division and also manned a portion of the western perimeter at Hagaru-ri where the Division Headquarters was located. A new innovation that was first utilized during the breakout from the Chosin Reservoir was the use of an Airborne Tactical Air Direction Center. Marines from MTACS-2 rigged additional radios into an R5D from VMR-152 and controlled close air support over the Marine column beginning on 7 December. Shortly after midnight on 15 December, MTACS-2 passed control of the airspace around Hungnam over to the Navy onboard Mount McKinley.

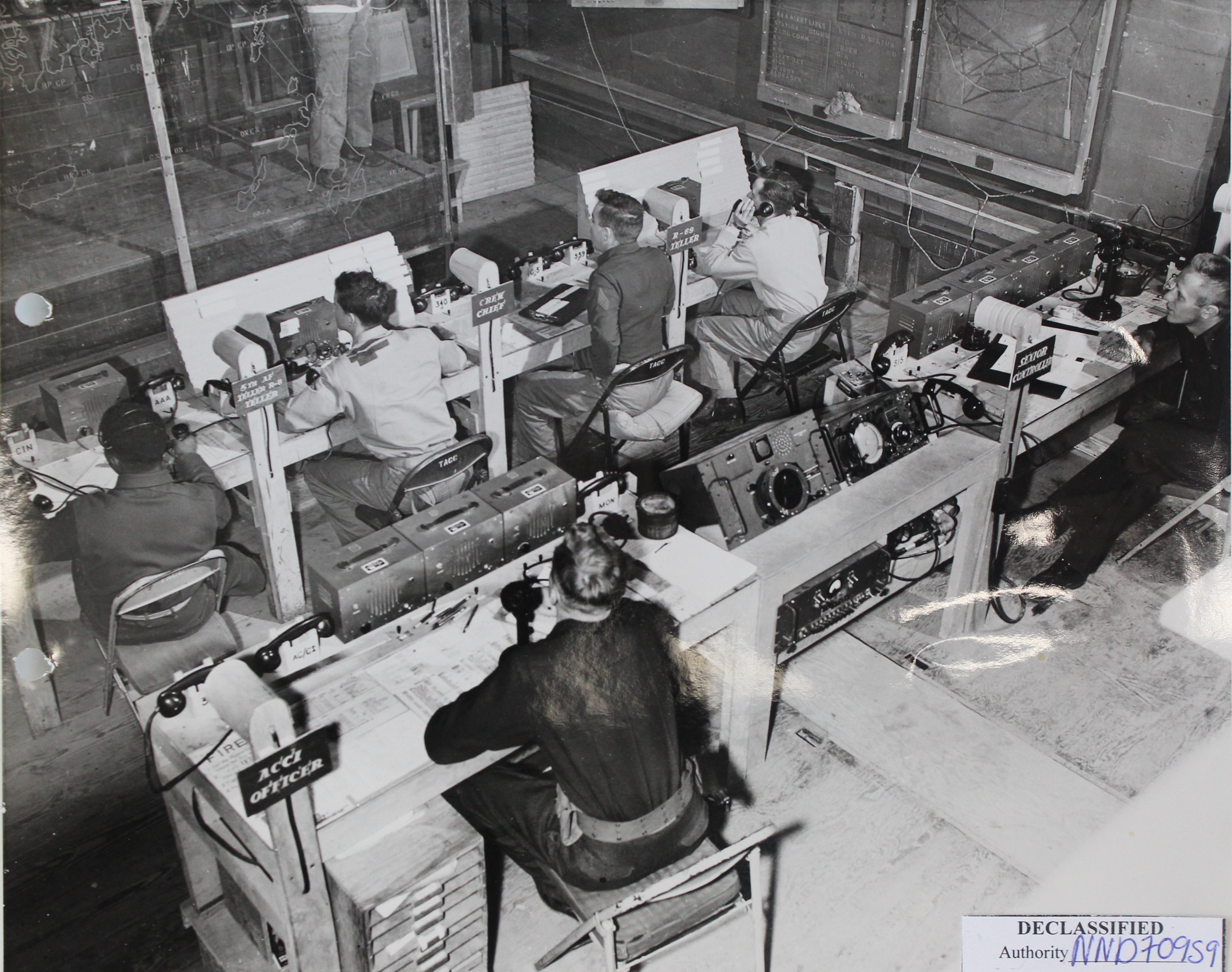
Inside the Tactical Air Control Center (TACC) run by MASS-2 in March 1954. This agency was responsible for coordinating the air defense of South Eastern Korea.

After the successful breakout of the Chosin Reservoir, the Air Support section was transported to Masan, on the southern coast of Korea. The Air Defense section remained aboard ship and sailed for Pusan, Korea and set up the TACC for operation at Pusan West AB (K-1). In August 1951, the Marine Air Support Radar Team 1 (MASRT-1) arrived from CONUS and was attached to MTACS-2. MASRT-1, nicknamed "Devastate Charlie" and a first of its kind system in the Marine Corps, utilized an AN/TPQ-2 ground based radar to control close air support. This was the first time the Marine Corps ever had a system that enabled accurate, day/night, all weather close air support. In March 1952, the Air Support section moved with the 1st Marine Division to the western front near Panmunjum. The Air Defense section continued to operate the TACC of the 1st Marine Aircraft Wing from its location at K-3 Airfield. The Squadron remained in Korea for the rest of the war until the Truce was signed in July 1953.

=== Interwar years ===
During the period July 1953 to July 1956, the squadron participated in the defense of the Korean Demilitarized Zone. It was stationed in the vicinity of Pohang, Korea and continued to train and participate in exercises. On February 15, 1954, Marine Tactical Air Control Squadron 2 was re-designated as Marine Air Support Squadron 2 (MASS-2). In July 1956, MASS-2 departed Korea for Marine Corps Air Station Iwakuni, Japan. The squadron remained at Iwakuni for the next six years continuing to train and support exercises across the Pacific. In March 1961, the squadron again moved to Okinawa, Japan. It was originally headquartered at Camp Hague until September 1962 when it moved to MCAS Futenma.

=== Vietnam War ===
MASS-2 operated in the Republic of Vietnam from 1965 to 1969. Early in April 1965 the Squadron was alerted for deployment to Vietnam. While in Vietnam, MASS-2 conducted operations at Da Nang, Chu Lai, Quảng Ngai, Marble Mountain, Phu Bai, Đông Hà, Camp Carroll, and Signal Hill, as well as other locations. The squadron redeployed to Iwakuni, Japan, in 1969 and, in 1973, became home-based at MCAS Futenma, Okinawa. During the Vietnam War, MASS-2 operated as an agency of the Marine Air Command and Control System of the 1st Marine Aircraft Wing while supporting the 3d Marine Division by providing both DASC and AN\TPQ-10 Air Support Radar Team (ASRT) support. While based in Futema the squadron maintained an ASRT team in Vietnam until late 1973.

==== 1965 ====
MASS-2 departed Naha, Okinawa on 11 April 1965 on board USS Washtenaw County. They arrived at Da Nang on 16 April 1965 and set up the DASC (callsign Landshark) 250 yards west of the runway at Da Nang Air Base. The squadron also set up an AN/TPQ-10 Air Support Radar Team. The DASC took control of their assigned airspace at 08:30 on 22 April. The first ASRT mission took place on 30 April when they controlled a flare dispensing mission in the vicinity of Da Nang. On 18 August, a second DASC (callsign Landshark Alpha) became operational at Chu Lai Air Base. Beginning on 1 May through the end of the year, MASS-2's two DASCs controlled 9562 missions and helped coordinate 994 medevacs throughout their assigned area of responsibility. While the original ASRT remained in Da Nang, the squadron added three more which also operated from Pleiku Air Base and later Chu Lai. The squadron's multiple Air Support Radar Teams would control 1872 missions throughout the year, resulting in the expending of approximately 4,886,000 lb (2,216,000 kg) of ordnance in support of Marine operations. During this time MASS-2 also provided mobile DASCs and a DASC Airborne capability in support of numerous named operations. Named operations that the squadron supported in 1965 include Starlite, Piranha, Red Snapper, Black Ferret, Blue Marlin & Harvest Moon.

==== 1966 ====
As the Marine Corps' involvement in Vietnam continued to grow in 1966, MASS-2 was pushed to its tactical limits supporting operations throughout I Corps. For much of the year the squadron operated four DASCs and four ASRTs concurrently. This included sourcing mobile DASCs to support three named operations. The squadron established new sites at Marble Mountain Air Facility, Quảng Ngãi, Phu Bai Combat Base and Hill 225 west of Danang. At its peak, MASS-2 supported four large area of operations across a 220-mile front. Relief finally arrived in November 1966 when Marine Air Support Squadron 3 (MASS-3) arrived in Vietnam to assist with air support operations.

Operational highlights for 1966 include a visit by then Secretary of Defense Robert McNamara to the MASS-2 DASC at Dong Ha on 13 October. ASRT "C" based in Phu Bai, was responsible for the first ASRT strikes into North Vietnam when it controlled six A-6A Intruders from VMA(AW)-242 against anti-aircraft sites near the DMZ. Beginning in July and continuing through the end of the year, the squadron's Civic Action Team established a relationship with the Primary School at Hoa My. MASS-2 Marines taught English classes and conducted numerous improvements to the school's facilities. Towards the end of the year the squadron also began investigating the feasibility of providing non-standard support utilizing the AN/TPQ-10s. The 5th Special Forces Group that operated nine camps throughout I Corps began coordination with MASS-2 so that they could receive ASRT support. There were also inquiries to see if the ASRT could be used to control parachute drops and provide emergency Ground-controlled approach in bad weather.

For the year, squadron DASCs controlled 31,236 rotary wing missions, 12,744 fixed wing missions and 12,042 medevacs. Squadron ASRTs controlled 12,042 strike missions responsible for dropping 36,824,200 lb (16,703,200 kg) of ordinance. Major named operations supported during 1966 include Operations Double Eagle, Utah, Texas, Georgia, Hastings, and Prairie. The year ended with a flurry when a large concentration of Viet Cong troops moving towards Huế was identified by a US Army OV-1 Mohawk equipped with Side looking airborne radar on New Year's Eve. ASRT "C" in Phu Bai proceeded to control 34 air strikes against this large troop formation dropping 204,000 lbs. of bombs on the enemy.

==== 1967 ====
For most of 1967, MASS-2 detachments remained stationary with a DASC and tethered ASRT operating from Danang, Dong Ha and Phu Bai. For the year, MASS-2 DASCs controlled 29,017 fixed wing sorties, 35,213 rotary wing sorties and 10,288 medevacs. Squadron ASRTs controlled 18,333 aircraft during 16,273 missions and were responsible for dropping 67,567,610 lb (30,648,150 kg) of ordnance. Named operations supported during the year include Hickory, Union, Kingfisher, Osceola, Medina, Kentucky, Lancaster, Neosho, Scotland, and Badger Tooth. Operations increased dramatically in December 1967 with squadron ASRTs recording their highest ever totals for number of missions and aircraft controlled.

==== 1968 ====
1968 began as the busiest yet for MASS-2 in Vietnam. The squadron supported Marine Corps and Army operations during the battles for Khe Sanh and Huế. On 22 & 23 January, MASS-2 Marines flew airborne DASC missions in direct support of the 26th Marine Regiment at Khe Sanh. During this time the squadron remained headquartered at Danang with Detachment 1 located at Dong Ha and Detachment 2 located at Phu Bai. A fourth ASRT commenced operations at Camp Carroll on 30 April. MASS-2 established an additional ASRT at Fire Support Base Veghel on 10 August in order to support XXIV Corps operations. The Veghel ASRT remained in place for month. It was disestablished on 9 September and the AN/TPQ-10 was accidentally dropped into the Gulf of Tonkin by a CH-53A Sea Stallion while being airlifted back to amphibious shipping. The Phu Bai DASC was disestablished on 10 September and all squadron personnel were consolidated at Dong Ha. The Phu Bai ASRT remained in place. On 19 November, the ASRT at Phu Bai was displaced to Hill 55 near Danang in order to support the 1st Marine Division during Operation Meade River. On 8 December the ASRT at Camp Carroll was moved to the Vandegrift Combat Base to support operations in the A Sầu Valley. For the year, squadron DASCs controlled 21,241 rotary wing missions, 22,285 fixed wing missions and 4573 medevacs. Squadron ASRTs controlled 16,590 strike missions responsible for dropping 105,261,290 lb (47,745,718 kg) of ordinance. During the course of the year MASS-2's DASCs and ASRTs also supported Operations Lancaster, Osceola, Kentucky, Napoleon and Saline, Carentan, Jeb Stuart, Nevada Eagle, Thor, Somerset Plain, and Taylor Common.

==== 1969 ====
In January 1969, MASS-2 assumed control of the Vandegrift DASC which was located on Route 9 just south of the Rockpile. The Da Nang ASRT was airlifted to Fire Support Base Cunningham in order to support Operation Dewey Canyon. On 18 April, after more than four years at Da Nang, the MASS-2 Command Post moved to Đông Hà. In May, an ASRT was sent to Fire Support Base Birmingham to support the 101st Airborne Division during Operation Apache Snow in the A Sầu Valley. The Vandegrift DASC was re-designated as a Helicopter Direction Center (HDC) in July 1969 after 9th Marines departed Vietnam. In the fall of 1969, MASS-2 received orders to redeploy from Vietnam. On 4 November 1969, MASS-2's last tactical agency in country went off the air when the Dong Ha DASC closed. On 4 November a 40-man detachment sailed from Cua Viet on board USS Meeker County en route to MCAS Futenma, Japan. On 22 November, the remainder of the squadron embarked on USS Windham County en route to Marine Corps Air Station Iwakuni thus closing the chapter on MASS-2's 4 1/2-year involvement in the Vietnam War.

=== 1970s ===
In January 1973, MASS-2 loaded their equipment on USS Racine and departed MCAS Iwakuni for MCAS Futenma. The move to Okinawa expanded the squadron's training opportunities for both the DASC and ASRT. Beginning in 1977, MASS-2 began participating in the annual Team Spirit Exercises that took place in South Korea. The squadron continued its participation until the Team Spirit Exercises were discontinued in 1993.

=== Global war on terror ===
Personnel from MASS-2 have augmented other units deploying to Afghanistan in support of Operation Enduring Freedom. They have also provided Marines for the 31st Marine Expeditionary Unit which has deployed to Iraq in support of Operation Iraqi Freedom.

== Unit awards ==
A unit citation or commendation is an award bestowed upon an organization for the action cited. Members of the unit who participated in said actions are allowed to wear on their uniforms the awarded unit citation. MASS-2 has been presented with the following awards:

Streamer	Award	Year(s)	Additional Info
A streamer with red, gold, and blue horizontal stripes with a bronze star in the center	Presidential Unit Citation Streamer with two Bronze Stars	1945, 1951, 1967	WWII, Korea, Vietnam
A green streamer with red, gold, and blue horizontal stripes along the top and bottom with one silver star in the center	Navy Unit Commendation Streamer with one Bronze Star	1952-1953, 1967-1968	Korea, Vietnam
A green streamer with red, gold, and blue horizontal stripes and four stars in the center	Meritorious Unit Commendation Streamer with four Bronze Stars	1982-1984, 1985–1987, 1988–1990, 1997–1999, 2004-2005	
	American Campaign Streamer		
	Asiatic-Pacific Campaign Streamer with one Silver and one Bronze Star		Guadalcanal, Eastern New Guinea, New Britain, Peleliu, Okinawa
	World War II Victory Streamer	1941–1945	Pacific War
	Navy Occupation Service Streamer with "ASIA"		
A red streamer with a horizontal gold stripe and three bronze stars in the center	National Defense Service Streamer with three Bronze Stars	1951–1954, 1961–1974, 1990–1995, 2001–present	Korean War, Vietnam War, Gulf War, war on terrorism
	Korean Service Streamer with one Silver Star and four Bronze Stars	1950-1953	
A yellow streamer with two green horizontal stripes on the outside and three horizontal red stripes and two silver stars and one bronze star in the center	Vietnam Service Streamer with two Silver Stars and one Bronze Star		
A blue streamer with yellow, red, and white horizontal stripes	Global War on Terrorism Service Streamer	2001–present	
	Korean Presidential Unit Citation Streamer	1950	
A gold streamer with red horizontal stripes on the outer portions and a green palm in the center	Vietnam Gallantry Cross with Palm Streamer	1965–1971	
A green streamer with red horizontal stripes	Vietnam Meritorious Unit Citation Civil Actions Streamer	1965–1971	

== Gallery ==
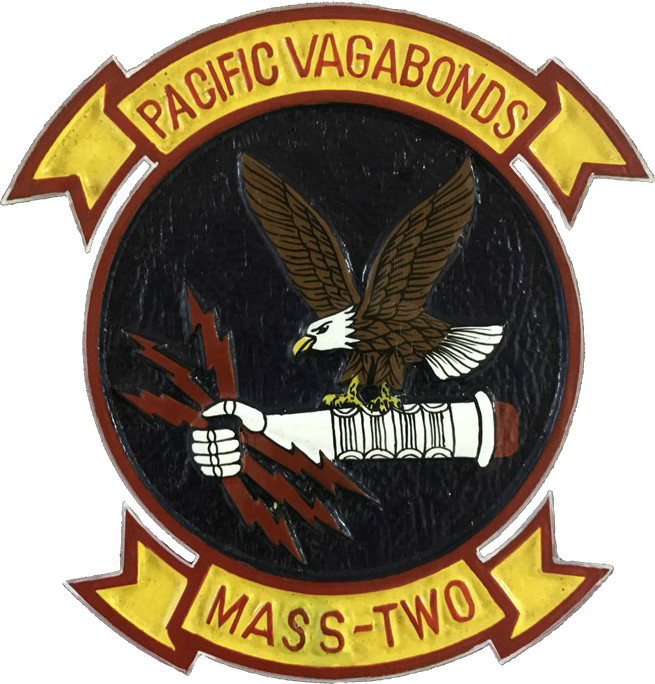
Squadron insignia during the 1980s

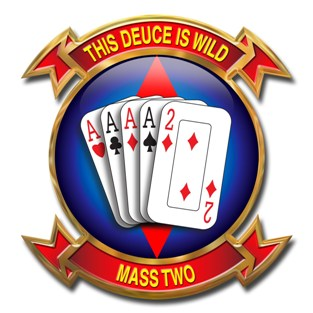
Squadron insignia from 1992 to 2017

== Notable members ==
- Joseph McCarthy - served with Headquarters Squadron 43 at MCAS El Centro, CA when the squadron was the headquarters for the Marine Gunnery School located there.

== See also ==
- United States Marine Corps Aviation
- List of United States Marine Corps aviation support units
