= Marine Aircraft Group 43 =

- Active: 1 Jan 1943 - 28 Jul 1955; 1 Jul 1962 – 1 Sep 1972
- Country: United States
- Allegiance: United States of America
- Branch: United States Marine Corps
- Type: Reserve aircraft group
- Part of: 4th Marine Aircraft Wing; Marine Forces Reserve
- Garrison/HQ: Naval Air Station Joint Reserve Base Willow Grove
- Engagements: World War II * Battle of Okinawa; Korean War

Commanders
- Current commander: N/A
- Notable commanders: Robert O. Bisson

Marine Aircraft Group 43 (MAG-43) was a fixed wing aviation group in the United States Marine Corps Reserve based at Naval Air Station Joint Reserve Base Willow Grove, Pennsylvania.

The group was originally formed during World War II as the administrative headquarters for all Marine Corps units training at Marine Corps Air Station El Centro, California. A mission change in late 1944 saw MAG-43 tasked to serve as the headquarters for the Air Defense Command of the Tactical Air Force, Tenth Army during the Battle of Okinawa. In this role the group was responsible for the employment of all land based fighters, radars and antiaircraft units. The group was later re-designated as Marine Air Control Group 2 (MACG-2) and saw service during the Korean War again overseeing Marine Corps aviation command and control equities. Deactivated in July 1955, the group was reactivated in 1962 as a part of a restructure of aviation within the Marine Corps Reserve. In 1969 the group was transferred to the 4th Marine Aircraft Wing until its deactivation in September 1972.

== History ==
=== World War II ===
==== Organization ====
Marine Aircraft Group 23 returned to Hawaii from Guadalcanal on 19 November 1942. The group's personnel were split up into four cadres that were used to form the initial personnel for four additional Marine aircraft groups. One of these four new groups, Marine Aircraft Base Defense Group 43, was activated on 1 January 1943 at Marine Corps Air Station El Centro, California. For its first two years MABDG-43 was the headquarters that oversaw training at MCAS El Centro and also participated in the defense of the west coast. On xx Oct/Nov 1944 the group's group's mission was changed. It was tasked with coordinating and controlling the air defense fight for the upcoming invasion of Okinawa. It was re-designated Marine Aircraft Group 43 (MAG-43) on 10 December 1944.

==== Okinawa ====
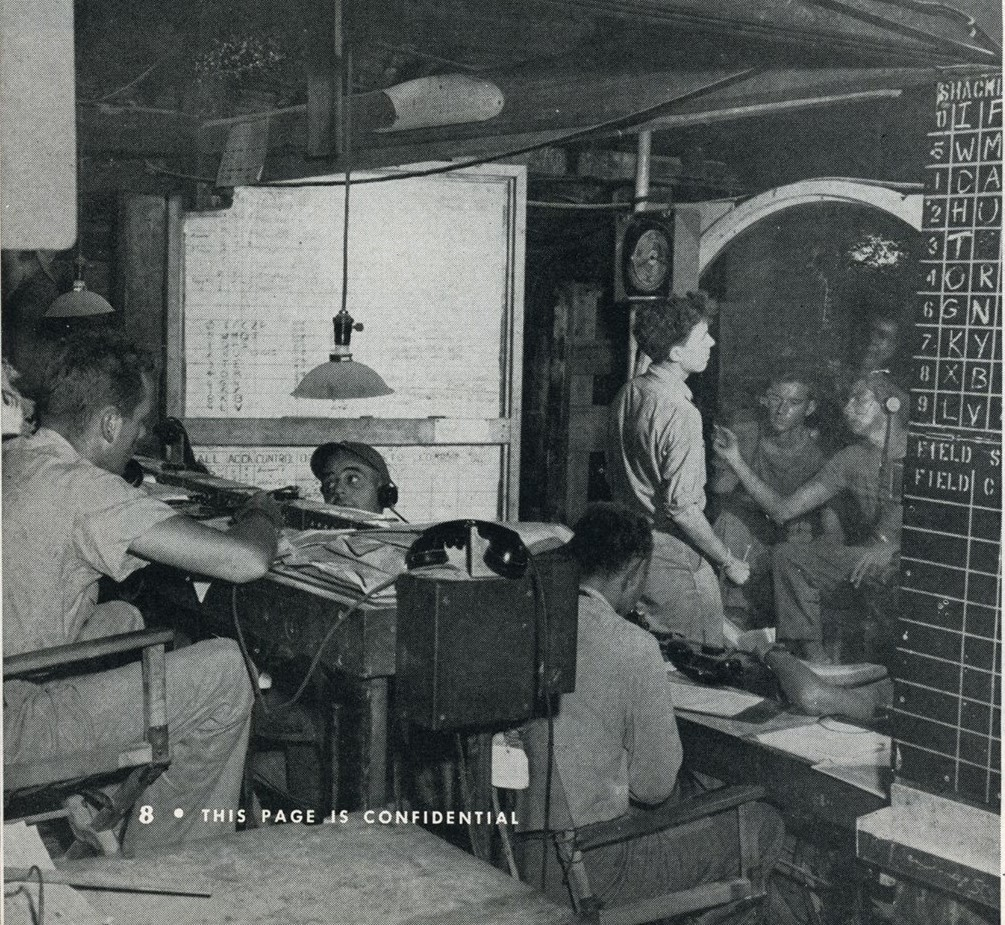
MAG-43 Marines manage the vertical plotting board inside the Air Defense Control Center during the Battle of Okinawa.

The group embarked on the USS Carteret (APA-70) at San Diego, California, on 24 January 1945. It arrived at Pearl Harbor, Hawaii, on 30 January and established itself at Marine Corps Air Station Ewa. For the upcoming Battle of Okinawa, the 2nd Marine Aircraft Wing (2d MAW) was made available to serve as the headquarters for the Tactical Air Force (TAF). The TAF was in command of all land-based aircraft during the battle. MAG-43's role for the battle was to serve as the headquarters for the Tactical Air Force's Air Defense Command (ADC) which had BGen William J. Wallace in command. On 22 February the group embarked on the USS Allendale and sailed west.

Mission at Okinawa
1) Control all fighter aircraft assigned to Tactical Air Force in execution of all assigned defensive and offensive missions.
2) Establish and Air Defense Command and Air Defense Control Center as soon as possible.
3) Assuming control of air defense including anti-aircraft artillery and searchlights from Commander, Air Support Control Units on order.
4) Establish and operate and early warning net.
5) Furnishing direct defense of the area in conjunction with fleet aircraft present.
6) Be prepared from time of initial establishment for emergency assistance to shipborne Air Support Control Units in handling carrier aircraft forced to land ashore.

On 1 April, the group arrived off the coast of Okinawa, Japan and finally went ashore 3 April. The Group's Expeditionary Air Defense Control Center, callsign Handyman, went on the air on 7 April 1945 based out of three LVTs modified with extra radios. On 16 April, MAG-43 established its full Air Defense Control Center (ADCC) in a farmer's house about a half mile southeast of Yontan Airfield in the village of Yomitan. By 30 June, MAG-43 consisted of 1,926 Marines with another 505 attached US Army personnel.

On 1 August 1945, MAG-43 was re-designated as Marine Air Defense Command 2 (MADC-2) under the 2nd Marine Aircraft Wing. That same month it moved from its position in Yomitan to higher ground on the eastern side of Okinawa just north of Nakagusuku Castle.

The group arrived in San Diego on board the USS Waukesha (AKA-84) on 15 April 1946 and was assigned to Marine Air West Coast at Marine Corps Air Station Miramar, California. On 1 August 1946 the group was again re-designated this time as Marine Air Control Group 2 (MACG-2). On 19 September 1946, MACG-2 relocated to Marine Corps Air Station El Toro, California. A year later on 1 October 1946 it was placed under the operational control of the 1st Marine Aircraft Wing.

=== Korean War ===
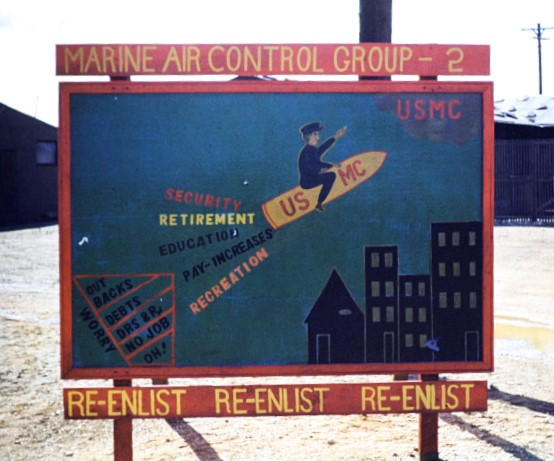
MACG-2 re-enlistment sign on K-3 Air Base during the Korean War.

At the outbreak of the Korean War, MTACS-2 and MGCIS-1 from MACG-2 were transferred to Marine Aircraft Group 33 to provide air support and air defense capabilities for the 1st Provisional Marine Brigade. Both squadrons were severely under strength and additional Marines were joined from other squadrons within MACG-2 to fill out the ranks prior to deployment. On 3 August, Marine Ground Control Intercept Squadron 2 and Marine Tactical Air Control Squadron 3 were commissioned under MACG-2 to replace the transferred units. Manpower for these new squadrons came from the recently activated Marine Corps Reserve.

On 4 March 1951, MACG-2 departed MCAS El Toro for San Francisco, California. The Group departed San Francisco the next day on board the USS General W. F. Hase. It arrived at Kobe, Japan and established headquarters at Itami Air Force Base. Between 11–20 April MACG-2 personnel were transported to South Korea via aircraft and naval shipping. MACG-2 established its headquarters at K-3 Air Base outside of Pohang and for the rest of the month was busy constructing its camp, quarters and working spaces.

While in Korea, MACG-2 was responsible for providing, operating and maintaining the 1st Marine Aircraft Wing's (1st MAW) tactical headquarters which was known as the Tactical Air Control Center (TACC). The TACC exercised operational control and direction of Marine Corps aircraft operating in Korea.

In February 1952 the 1st Marine Aircraft Wing's Electronic Countermeasures Section was transferred under MACG-2 which also oversaw the Wing's airborne early warning capability that was provided by MACG-2's radar equipped AD-1 Skyraiders. The Electronic Countermeasures Section was utilized to find and classify North Korean radar sites. This section eventually became Marine Composite Squadron 1 (VMC-1) on 15 September 1952.

MACG-2 departed Korea on 25 May 1955 on board the USS Washburn. The ship arrived at San Pedro, California on 11 June and the group immediately returned to MCAS El Toro. MACG-2 was deactivated at MCAS El Toro on 28 July 1955.

=== Reserve duty ===
MAG-43 was reactivated at Naval Air Station Willow Grove, Pennsylvania on 1 July 1962. On 1 February 1965 the Group was transferred underneath the newly reactivated 4th Marine Aircraft Wing. The group was decommissioned as part of the post-Vietnam drawdown of forces on 1 September 1972.

== Gallery ==
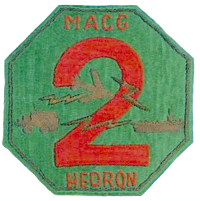
MACG-2 insignia from the 1950s

== Unit awards ==
A unit citation or commendation is an award bestowed upon an organization for the action cited. Members of the unit who participated in said actions are allowed to wear on their uniforms the awarded unit citation. MAG-43 has been presented with the following awards:

Streamer	Award	Year(s)	Additional Info
A streamer with red, gold, and blue horizontal stripes with a bronze star in the center	Presidential Unit Citation Streamer with one Bronze Star	1945, 1951	Okinawa, Korea
A green streamer with red, gold, and blue horizontal stripes along the top and bottom with one silver star in the center	Navy Unit Commendation Streamer	1952-1953	Korea
	American Campaign Streamer	1943-45	World War II
	Asiatic-Pacific Campaign Streamer with one Bronze Star	1945	Okinawa
	World War II Victory Streamer	1941–1945	Pacific War
A red streamer with a horizontal gold stripe and three bronze stars in the center	National Defense Service Streamer	1951–1954, 1961–1974, 1990–1995, 2001–present	Korean War
	Korean Service Streamer with one Silver Star and two Bronze Stars	1950-1953	First UN Counter-offensive 1951, Communist China Spring Offensive 1951, UN Summer-Fall Offensive 1951, Second Korean Winter 1951-52, Korean Defense Summer-Fall 1952, Third Korean Winter 1952-53, Korea Summer-Fall 1953

== See also ==
- List of United States Marine Corps aircraft groups
- List of United States Marine Corps aviation support squadrons
