= Marine Air Control Squadron 1 =

United States military unit

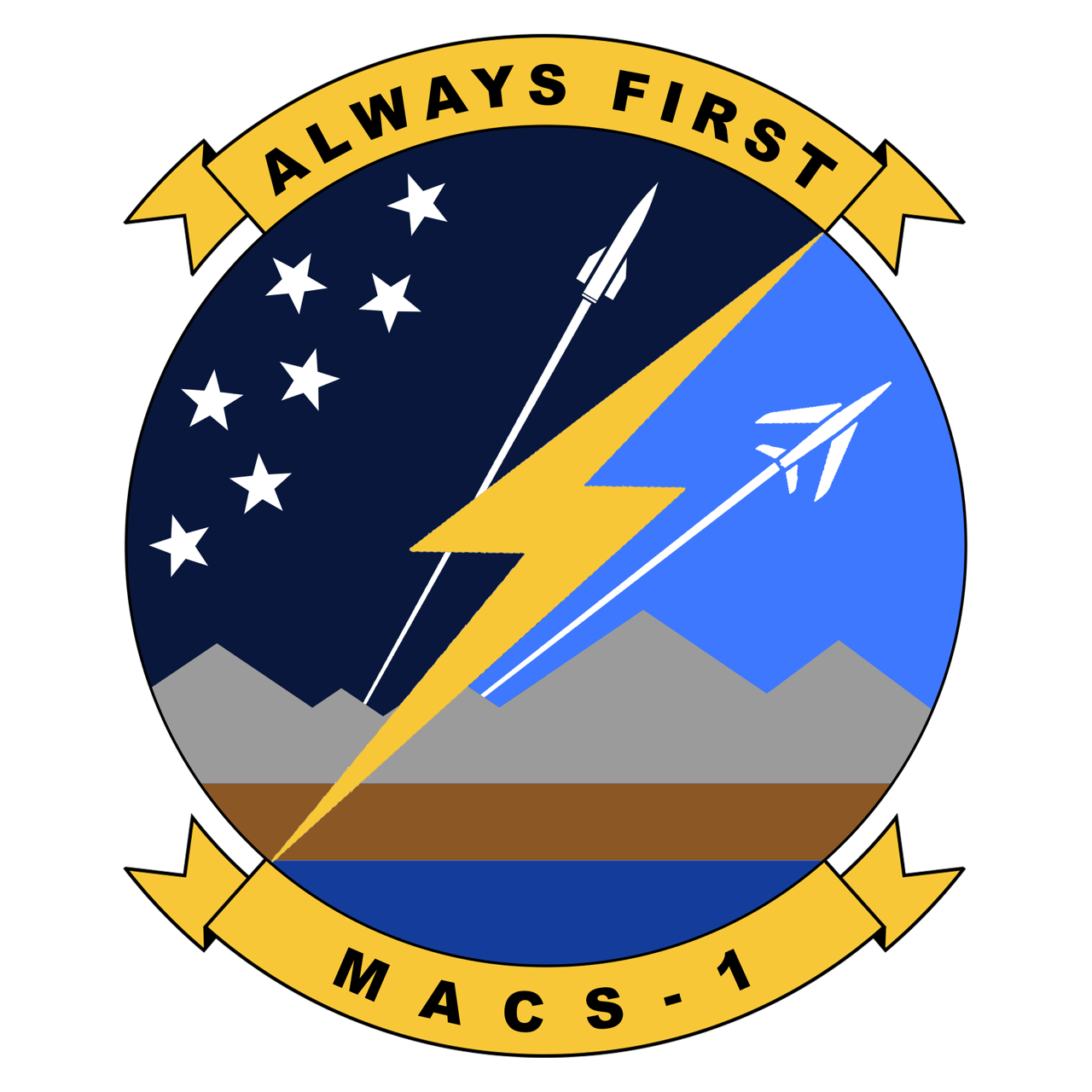
- MACS-1 Insignia
- Active: 1 Sept 1943 – 1 Feb 1972; 7 Oct 1983 - present
- Country: United States
- Branch: United States Marine Corps
- Type: Aviation Command & Control
- Role: Aerial surveillance & Air traffic control
- Part of: Marine Air Control Group 38; 3rd Marine Aircraft Wing
- Garrison/HQ: Marine Corps Air Station Yuma
- Nickname: Falconers,
- Motto: "Always First"
- Engagements: World War II; Battle of Eniwetok; Battle of Okinawa; Korean War; Operation Desert Storm; Operation Enduring Freedom; Operation Iraqi Freedom

Commanders
- Current commander: LtCol Shane A. Bladen

Marine Air Control Squadron 1 (MACS-1) is a United States Marine Corps aviation command and control squadron. The squadron provides aerial surveillance, air traffic control, ground-controlled intercept, and aviation data-link connectivity for the I Marine Expeditionary Force. It was the first air warning squadron commissioned as part of the Marine Corps' new air warning program and is the second oldest aviation command and control unit in the Marine Corps. The squadron is based at Marine Corps Air Station Yuma and falls under Marine Air Control Group 38 and the 3rd Marine Aircraft Wing.

== Organization ==
Name	Location	
Headquarters and Support Company	MCAS Yuma	
Air Defense Company Alpha	MCAS Yuma	
Air Defense Company Bravo	MCB Pendleton	
Air Traffic Control Company Kilo	MCB Pendleton	
Tactical Air Command Company | Tactical Air Command Company	MCAS Miramar	MCAS Miramar
Air Traffic Control Company Lima	MCAS Miramar	
Air Traffic Control Company Mike	MCAS Yuma	

== Mission ==
Provide air surveillance, airspace management and the control of aircraft and surface-to-air weapons for anti-air warfare and offensive air support while independently or simultaneously providing continuous all-weather radar and non-radar ATC services as in integral part of the Marine Air Command and Control system (MACCS) in support of a Marine Air-Ground Task Force (MAGTF), and Joint Force Commander.

== History ==
=== World War II ===
==== Formation and movement to Hawaii ====
Air Warning Squadron 1 was commissioned on 1 September 1943 at Marine Corps Air Station Cherry Point, North Carolina. It was the first early warning squadron organized under the newly established 1st Marine Air Warning Group The squadron's initial Table of organization and equipment had 14 officers and 192 enlisted Marines assigned. On 15 November the squadron boarded trains in North Carolina bound for the West Coast. It arrived on 22 November 1943 at Marine Corps Air Station El Toro, California and began a short period of additional training prior to deployment.

On 29 December, AWS-1 personnel boarded the USS White Plains (CVE-66) headed for the Territory of Hawaii. It arrived at Pearl Harbor on 4 January 1944 and was transported to Marine Corps Air Station Ewa. Upon arrival it was reassigned to Marine Aircraft Group 22, 4th Marine Base Defense Aircraft Wing and began training for combat missions in support of the World War II Pacific Campaign. After a short period of time at MCAS Ewa the squadron boarded the USS Mormacport on 12 February and sailed west for its first combat operation.

==== Eniwetok ====
On 20 February 1944, AWS-1 landed on Engebi as part of the larger Gilbert and Marshall Islands campaign. The squadron set up its SCR-270 and SCR-527 radars and took control of the airspace over Eniwetok on 1 March 1944. During its time on Engebi the squadron worked closely with the 10th Defense Battalion to ensure the aircraft it controlled were properly deconflicted from the battalion's air defense fires.

The first Japanese air raids against the Marines on Engebi occurred on the evening on 8 March 1944. Twenty Japanese aircraft departed Truk Atoll at 0230 inbound Engebi from the southwest. Twelve of the aircraft acted as decoys to draw American interceptors away while eight Japanese aircraft, successfully employing chaff to deceive American radars, made three bombing runs over the course of an hour and half. The first bombing run destroyed AWS-1's VHF radio transmitter necessitating immediate repair so aircraft control could continue. SSgt Jacob Marty was killed during the second bombing run while attempting to restore VHF communications. He was the first Marine from a Marine air warning squadron to be killed in action. Another seven Marines were injured during this raids.

==== Okinawa ====
AWS-1 arrived off of Okinawa on 19 April and landed on Ie Shima on 21 April 1945 and began setting up its radars and air defense control centers. The squadron was operational by the end of the month. During its first 36 days of operations, AWS-1 plotted more than 200 Japanese raids and aircraft under its control scored a total of 149 enemy aircraft destroyed or damaged. On 9 July the squadron sent a long range radar detachment to Iheya Island to further expand the radar coverage around Okinawa.

Following the war the squadron remained on Ie Shima until February 1946. The squadron's forward echelon departed on 23 February 1946 onboard USS LST-690, arriving back in the States on 29 March 1946. Main body personnel and equipment were loaded onto USS LST-970 for transport back to the United States. With stops in Guam and Pearl Harbor en route, the main body did not arrive back at Marine Corps Air Station Miramar, CA until 14 April 1946. Upon arrival at MCAS Miramar the squadron was administratively assigned to Marine Air Warning Group 2. On 1 August 1946 the squadron was re-designated as Marine Ground Control Intercept Squadron 1 and in July 1947 it moved to Marine Corps Base Camp Pendleton, California. In October 1947 the squadron was reassigned to Marine Air Control Group 2.

=== Korean War ===
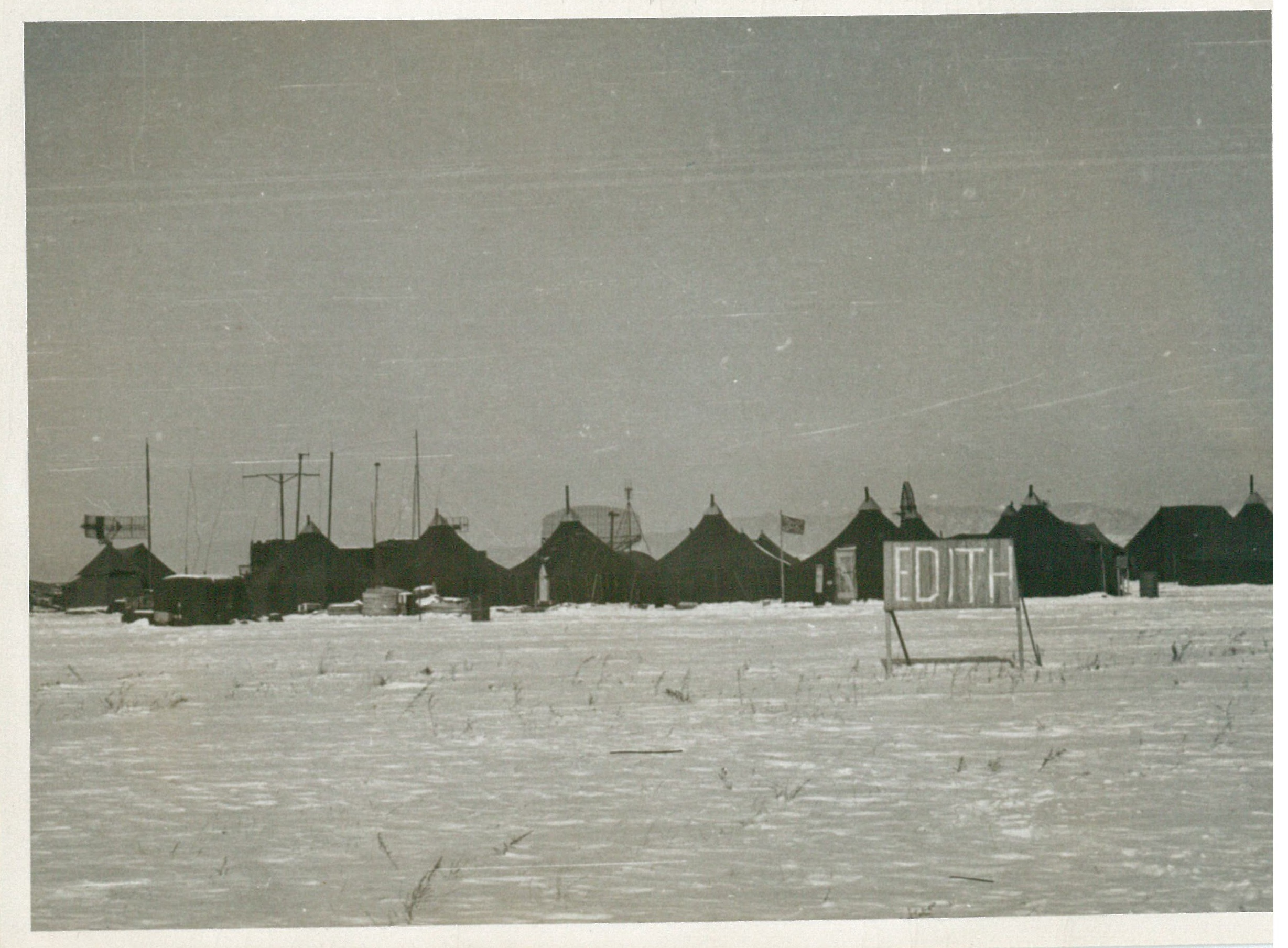
MGCIS-1 radar site located at Yonpo Airfield, Korea in December 1950.

MGCIS-1 was alerted for duty in Korea on 5 July 1950 and reassigned to Marine Aircraft Group 33 the following day. At the outbreak of the war, MGCIS-1 was severely under strength. Additional Marines were joined from other squadrons within Marine Air Control Group 2 to fill out the squadron's ranks prior to deployment. The squadron departed Long Beach Harbor on 14 July 1950 on board USS General A. E. Anderson. They arrived in Kobe, Japan on 1 August 1950 and set up operations at Itami Air Force Base, Honshu, Japan to be co-located with VMF(N)-513.

On 10 September, MGCIS-1 personnel boarded the USS George Clymer (APA-27) departed Kobe. While en route they established a secondary Tactical Air Control Center on board in case any of the primary control ships were knocked out during the upcoming assault. Following the Inchon landings on 15 September, the squadron came ashore on 17 September and established radars and a control center at Kimpo Air Base. They were partially operating by 20 September. While at Kimpo, MGCIS-1 controlled combat air patrol aircraft in the airspace and cleared cargo aircraft into the field. The squadron secured operations on 10 October and returned to the port at Inchon to prepare for follow on tasking. Personnel and gear were loaded onto the USS Alshain and the USNS Marine Phoenix (T-AP-195) and departed the harbor on 17 September.

The squadron was administratively transferred to Marine Aircraft Group 12 in October 1950. MGCIS-1 secured operations in Hungnam on 11 December and all personnel boarded an LST on 13 December as part of the Hungnam evacuation. While afloat, squadron controllers assisted their US Navy counterparts controlling hundreds of aircraft daily during the operation. The squadron sailed for Pusan, Korea and set up its equipment at Pusan West AB (K-1) as it prepared for follow-on tasking. In April 1951 MGCIS-1 was again administratively transferred to under the control of MACG-2. MGCIS-1 participated in the defense of the Korean Demilitarized Zone from July 1953 through March 1955. On 15 February 1954 the squadron received its current moniker of Marine Air Control Squadron 1.. In April 1955 the unit redeployed to Naval Air Facility Atsugi, Japan, and was reassigned to Marine Aircraft Group 11 (MAG-11).

=== 1960 through 1972 ===
The squadron was reduced to cadre status during March–April 1960. It was relocated during May 1960 to Marine Corps Air Station Yuma, Arizona and reassigned to Marine Wing Headquarters Group, 3rd Marine Aircraft Wing. On 1 February 1972, the squadron was decommissioned.

=== Reactivation, 1980s & 1990s ===
11 years later in October 1983, the squadron was reactivated at Marine Corps Base Camp Pendleton, California, as Marine Air Control Squadron 1, Marine Air Control Group 38, 3rd Marine Aircraft Wing. It participated in Operation Desert Shield in Southwest Asia from August until October 1990, though some elements of MACS-1 remained in Saudi Arabia in support of MACS-2.

MACS-1 Relocated during Jun 1998 to Marine Corps Air Station Yuma, Arizona. Elements supported Operation Southern Watch, Iraq, March–April 2000 and in November–December 2000, and May–June 2001.

=== Global war on terror ===
Elements of MACS-1 supported Operation Enduring Freedom, in Afghanistan from January–May 2002. This was followed by a deployment to Kuwait in February 2003 and participating in Operation Iraqi Freedom from March 2003 to present, both as an Air Control agency, and subsequently standing up several Security Companies.

From 2009 through 2014, MACS-1, in concert with MACS-2, supported sustained TAOC operations at Camp Leatherneck, in Helmand Province, Afghanistan. Utilizing the AN/TPS-59 radar as its primary sensor, these units were responsible for controlling 70,000 square miles of airspace in support of Regional Command Southwest operations. From 2009 through 2014, both MACS-1 and MACS-2 coordinated more than 320,000 fixed-wing operations, 80,000 aerial refueling operations, and more than 7,000 rotary wing operations. The TAOC's mission in Afghanistan ended in November 2014 as the Marine Corps withdrew its presence in Southern Afghanistan and turned over control of the area to United States Air Force's 71st Expeditionary Air Control Squadron.

== Notable former members ==
- Lee Harvey Oswald – fatally shot President John F. Kennedy in 1963.

== Gallery ==
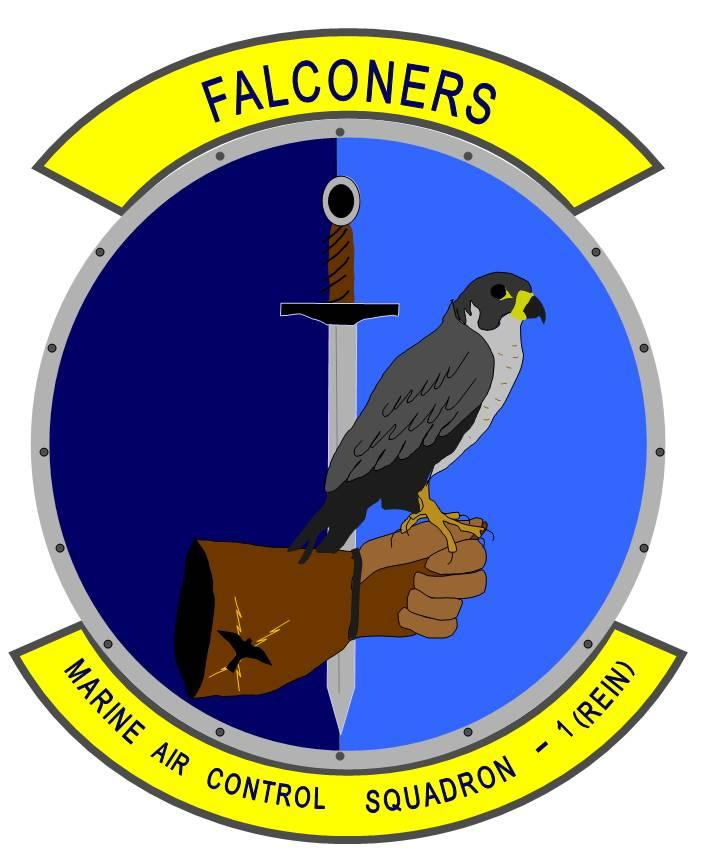
Squadron insignia from 2005-2023

== Unit awards ==
A unit citation or commendation is an award bestowed upon an organization for the action cited. Members of the unit who participated in said actions are allowed to wear on their uniforms the awarded unit citation. Marine Air Control Squadron 1 has been presented with the following awards:

Streamer	Award	Year(s)	Additional Info
	Presidential Unit Citation (Navy) Streamer with three Bronze Stars	1945, 1950, 1951, 2003	Okinawa, Korea, Iraq
	Presidential Unit Citation (Army) Streamer	1950	Korea
	Navy Unit Commendation Streamer with four Bronze Stars	1952–1953, 1990, 2004–05, 2005–06, 2006–07	Korea, Southwest Asia, Iraq
	Meritorious Unit Commendation Streamer with two Bronze Stars	1985–87, 1988–1989, 1998–1999	
	Asiatic-Pacific Campaign Streamer with two Bronze Stars	1944, 1945	Eniwetok, Okinawa
	World War II Victory Streamer	1941–1945	Pacific War
	Navy Occupation Service Streamer with "ASIA"		
	National Defense Service Streamer with three Bronze Stars	1950–1954, 1961–1974, 1990–1995, 2001–present	Korean War, Vietnam War, Gulf War, war on terrorism
	Korean Service Streamer with four Bronze Stars	1950–1953	
	Southwest Asia Service Streamer with one Bronze Star	September 1990 – February 1991	Desert Shield, Desert Storm
	Afghanistan Campaign Streamer with one bronze star		
	Iraq Campaign Streamer with four Bronze Stars		
	Global War on Terrorism Expeditionary Streamer		
	Global War on Terrorism Service Streamer	2001–present	
	Korea Presidential Unit Citation Streamer		

== See also ==
- AN/TPS-59
- United States Marine Corps Aviation
- Organization of the United States Marine Corps
- List of United States Marine Corps aviation support units
