= Marine Corps Outlying Field Atlantic =

- IATA: none; ICAO: none; FAA LID: 12NC

Summary
- Airport type: Military
- Owner: United States Marine Corps
- Operator: MCAS Cherry Point
- Location: Atlantic, North Carolina
- Built: 1941
- Elevation AMSL: 15 ft / 5 m
- Coordinates: 34°53′28.40″N 76°20′58.04″W
- Interactive map of Marine Corps Outlying Field Atlantic

Runways
Direction	Length		Surface
Direction	ft	m	Surface
5/23	3,678	1,121	Asphalt
1/19	3,575	1,090	Asphalt
10/28	3,500	1,067	Asphalt

Marine Corps Outlying Field Atlantic is a military airport of the United States Marine Corps in Atlantic, North Carolina, operated as a training field by Marine Corps Air Station Cherry Point.
