= Marine Aircraft Group 14 =

United States Marine Corps aviation unit

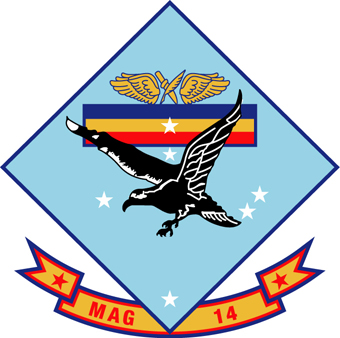
- MAG-14 Insignia
- Active: N/A
- Country: United States
- Allegiance: United States of America
- Branch: United States Marine Corps
- Type: Fixed Wing
- Role: Anti-Air Warfare; SEAD; Offensive Air Support; Aerial Reconnaissance; Assault Support
- Part of: 2nd Marine Aircraft Wing; II Marine Expeditionary Force
- Garrison/HQ: Marine Corps Air Station Cherry Point
- Engagements: World War II * Battle of Guadalcanal * Battle of the Santa Cruz Islands * Naval Battle of Guadalcanal * Battle of Bougainville * Philippines campaign (1944–45) * Battle of Okinawa; Operation Desert Storm; Operation Enduring Freedom; Operation Iraqi Freedom

Commanders
- Current commander: Col. Arthur Q. Bruggeman
- Notable commanders: William O. Brice; Albert D. Cooley; Roy L. Kline

Marine Aircraft Group 14 (MAG-14) is a United States Marine Corps aviation unit based at Marine Corps Air Station Cherry Point, North Carolina that is currently composed of one AV-8B Harrier squadron, two F-35B squadrons, one F-35C squadron, one UAV training squadron, one KC-130 squadron, and an aviation logistics squadron.

== Mission ==
Conduct offensive air support, anti-air warfare, electronic warfare, assault support, and air reconnaissance operations in support of the Marine Air-Ground Task Force or joint and coalition forces, and conduct fleet replacement program training in order to provide combat capable aircrews to operational squadrons.

== Subordinate units ==
F-35B Lightning II Squadrons

- VMA-223 "Bulldogs" (will transition to F-35B Lightning II and be redesignated Marine Fighter Attack Squadron 223 (VMFA-223))
- VMFA-231 "Ace of Spades"
- VMFA-542 "Tigers"

F-35C Lightning II Squadron

- VMFA-115 "Silver Eagles"
- VMFA-251 "Thunderbolts"

UAV Squadron

- VMUT-2 "Night Owls"

KC-130J Squadron

- VMGR-252 "Otis"

Aviation Logistics Squadron

- MALS-14 "Dragons"

== History ==
=== World War II ===
Marine Aircraft Group 14 was formed under the command of Lieutenant colonel Albert D. Cooley at then Camp Kearny, California on 1 March 1942. The nucleus for the new aircraft group came from Marine Aircraft Group 11 which had just arrived from Marine Corps Air Station Quantico following the 7 December 1941 attack on Pearl Harbor. They remained there training until they deployed for the Pacific Theater in October 1942. The Group soon arrived at Guadalcanal relieving Marine Aircraft Group 23 on 16 October 1942 to become part of the Cactus Air Force. The group would take part in the Battle of the Santa Cruz Islands just 10 days later. In November 1942 they took part in the Naval Battle of Guadalcanal and continued to fight in the skies over the island until 4 April 1943 when they were sent to Seagrove Aerodrome,Auckland, New Zealand to rest and refit.

MAG-14 returned to the Solomon Islands in August 1943 and set up the Fighter Command at Munda. The next month part of the group was moved to Ondonga and later on more units were sent to Vella Lavella. From these locations they supported the Marines and American and Allied soldiers during the Battle of New Georgia and the Battle of Bougainville.

On 15 February 1944, New Zealand troops captured the Green Islands in Papua New Guinea. Less than two weeks later aircraft from MAG-14 were operating from the airstrip here known as Lagoon Field. From here, MAG-14 units would continue to keep pressure on the isolated Japanese garrisons of Rabaul and Kavieng.

By 24 January 1945, four fighter squadrons from MAG-14 were operating from Guiuan in the northern Philippines province of Eastern Samar. During fighting in the Philippines the Group was responsible for covering convoys and supporting Army and Filipino guerillas on the islands of Negros, Mindanao, Cebu and Leyte.

Following the war, the Group returned to the United States in February 1946 and settling at Marine Corps Outlying Field Oak Grove in March 1946. The group moved to MCAS Cherry Point in July 1946 only to be sent back to Oak Grove for a six-month stint beginning in December 1946. During the group's time at Oak Grove it supported combined Caribbean maneuvers during February and March 1947. MAG-14 returned to MCAS Cherry Point on June 6, 1947.

=== The Gulf War & the 1990s ===
During Operation Desert Storm, MAG-14 flew night combat missions deep into Iraq and Kuwait and provided artillery destruction of the Iraqi Republican Guard. VMA-231 and VMA-542 provided more than 2,000 offensives in conjunction with delivering close to 4.5 million pounds of ordnance during January and February 1991.

In November 1999, Marine Unmanned Aerial Vehicle Squadron-2 (VMU-2) was reassigned from MAG-14 to Marine Air Control Group 28 (MACG-28) at the decision of the USMC Force Structure Planning Group. On 13 May 2013 VMU-2 was officially reassigned from Marine Air Control Group 28 back to Marine Aircraft Group 14.

=== Global War on Terror ===
On 14 May 2012, MWSS-271 was transferred to MAG-14 after Marine Wing Support Group 27 (MWSG-27) was deactivated, but was transferred back on 22 May 2018, when MWSG-27 was reactivated at MCAS Cherry Point.

== See also ==
- List of United States Marine Corps aircraft squadrons
- List of United States Marine Corps aircraft groups
- United States Marine Corps Aviation
