= 6th Special Security Communications Team (United States) =

- Active: Early 1960s – present
- Country: United States
- Branch: USMC
- Type: Special security communications team
- Role: Expeditionary communications
- Part of: 2nd Marine Aircraft Wing
- Garrison/HQ: Marine Corps Air Station Cherry Point
- Motto: Semper Usus Cerebrum
- Engagements: Vietnam War; Operation Iraqi Freedom; Operation Enduring Freedom

The 6th Special Security Communications Team (6th SSCT) is one of six Special Security Communications Teams in the United States Marine Corps. The team provides 2nd Marine Aircraft Wing, its commanders, and subordinate units with an expeditionary communications capability. The 6th SSCT is attached to the aviation combat element and is based at Marine Corps Air Station Cherry Point, North Carolina. The team can be forward deployed by land, air or sea worldwide to provide expeditionary, tactical, and mobile communications to the 2nd Marine Aircraft Wing Commander.

== Mission ==
Provide Special Intelligence (SI) record communications support to the Commanding General of the 2nd Marine Aircraft Wing (MAW) and designated subordinate elements. This team, which is composed of 15 specially trained communications intelligence Marines, operates the terminal communications equipment for the 2nd Marine Aircraft Wing Sensitive Compartmented Information Facility (SCIF).

Under the staff cognizance of the Assistant Chief of Staff (AC/S), G-2, 2nd Marine Aircraft Wing:

1. Provide Special Intelligence/Special Security Office (SI/SSO) record communications and cryptographic guard for the Wing Headquarters.
2. Coordinate all matters pertaining to SI/SSO communications circuit path and equipment maintenance (less 1st echelon) with the Wing Communication-Electronics Officer (CEO).
3. Perform (1st echelon) maintenance on all assigned fixed plant and tactical equipment.
4. Receive, process, and stow SI/SSO materials.
5. While in garrison, operate a fixed-plant, full-duplex, on-line, secure record SI/SSO communications terminal facility as provided by the host base station.
6. Provide off-line cryptographic SI/SSO communications support for the supported commander.
7. Maintain and exercise ground-mobile, tactical on-line and off-line record SI/SSO communications terminal facilities.
8. Be prepared to deploy, install, operate, and maintain ground-based tactical SI/SSO record communications facilities in support of the tactical commander.
9. Identify requirements for access to SI/SSO terminal facilities in Ships' Signals Exploitation Spaces (SSES), as necessary.
10. Provide personnel to man SSES communications facilities while afloat.
11. Assist the SI support section with the Wing G-2 Section as directed by the AC/S, G-2.
12. Conduct military, special, and technical training, as required.

== Current status ==
The 6th SSCT is currently in garrison at Marine Corps Air Station Cherry Point.

== Training ==
All Marines assigned to the 6th SSCT hold the 2651 MOS. Entry into the 2651 MOS requires successful completion of Recruit Training and Marine Combat Training (MCT). Following graduation from MCT, prospective 2651's proceed to the Marine Corps Detachment, Goodfellow Air Force Base, San Angelo, TX, where they attend the Tactical SIGINT Operators Course (TSOC). Upon graduation, Marines are formally assigned the primary MOS of 2651.

== Locations ==
While in garrison, the 6th SSCT is permanently located at Marine Corps Air Station Cherry Point in Havelock, NC.

== See also ==
- Radio Battalion
- United States Marine Corps Forces Cyberspace Command
- United States Cyber Command
- National Security Agency
