= Marine Wing Communications Squadron 28 =

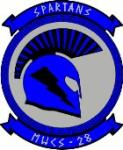
- MWCS-28 Insignia
- Active: 1 September 1967 – present
- Country: United States of America
- Branch: United States Marine Corps
- Type: Aviation Command & Control
- Role: Communications
- Part of: Marine Air Control Group 28; 2nd Marine Aircraft Wing
- Garrison/HQ: Marine Corps Air Station Cherry Point
- Nickname: Spartans
- Engagements: Operation Desert Storm; Operation Iraqi Freedom * 2003 invasion of Iraq

Commanders
- Current commander: LtCol Steve M. Magee

Marine Wing Communications Squadron 28 (MWCS-28) is a United States Marine Corps communications squadron. The squadron provides expeditionary communications for the aviation combat element of the II Marine Expeditionary Force. They are based at Marine Corps Air Station Cherry Point and fall under the command of Marine Air Control Group 28 and the 2nd Marine Aircraft Wing.

== Mission ==
Provide expeditionary communications for the aviation combat element (ACE) of a Marine Expeditionary Force (MEF), including the phased deployment element of tasked-organized elements thereof.

== Tasks ==
- Provide for the effective command of subordinate elements.
- Assist in the systems planning and engineering of ACE communications; and install, operate, and maintain expeditionary communications for command and control of the MEF ACE.
- Provide operational System Control Centers, as required, to coordinate communication functions internally and externally to the ACE.
- Provide calibration and repair facility for all ground common Test Measurement Diagnostic Equipment (TMDE) in the Marine Aircraft Wing (MAW).
- Provide maintenance support for Ground Common Communications Equipment in the MAW.
- Provide the digital backbone communications support for the ACE Command Element (CE), forward operating bases, and Marine Air Command and Control System (MACCS) agencies for up to two airfields per detachment.
- Provide tactical, automated switching, and telephone services for the ACE CE, and Tactical Air Command Center (TACC).
- Provide electronic message distribution for the ACE CE, primary MACCS agencies, and tenant units.
- Provide external, single-channel radio and radio retransmission communications support for ACE operations, as required.
- Provide deployed Wide Area Network, and deployed Local Area Network server support for the ACE CE, and primary MACCS agencies.
- Provide the Support Cryptographic Site (SCS), for all Ground Common and MACCS assigned Communication Security Equipment within the ACE.
- Plan and coordinate individual and unit training, as required to qualify subordinate detachments for tactical deployment and combat operations.

== Unit History ==
=== Early history: 1960s and 1970s ===
Throughout the Squadron's early history, MWCS-28 supported a variety of large scale, Joint, and Coalition exercises tying aviation assets and aviation command and control agencies to the Marine Air Ground Task Force. In the context of the Squadron's establishment during the Vietnam War, the Squadron's contributions and participation in these specific types of exercises ensured the 2d Marine Aircraft Wing's and the Corps' ability to provide combat power during major combat operations. Originally designated Marine Wing Communications Squadron 2, MWCS-28 was formed on 1 September 1967. MWCS-2 was organized by aggregating the organic communications sections from Marine Air Control Group 2's subordinate squadrons in to a single, centralized communications element. MWCS-2, under the command of Major Madigan with 5 officers and 55 enlisted Marines, reported to Marine Wing Headquarters Group 2. In Jul 1, 1971, MWCS-2 was re-designated as MWCS-28 and was reassigned to its present higher headquarters, Marine Air Control Group 28.

Exercises like "Operation Teamwork 76" in Europe and "Operation Bonded Item 76" in Denmark and West Germany supported the employment of aviation assets to North Atlantic Treaty Organization forces. Additionally, exercises like "Exotic Dancer III" and Exotic Dancer IV", held at Camp Lejeune, North Carolina, were two of the largest military operations outside the Vietnam War. These exercises provided communications support to 60,000 troops from all branches of the armed forces, and supported the Wing's core competencies during major combat operations.

On 6 September 1979, a massive fire ruined MWCS-28's Headquarters buildings. Maintaining their focus on mission accomplishment, seven days after the fire, the Squadron embarked on ships bound for Turkey on 13 September to participate in "Display Determination 79." During this exercise, MWCS-28 Marines enabled command and control for Marine Aircraft Group 20. During their first 13 years, MWCS-28 supported core competencies for aviation elements during major combat operations and demonstrated the ability to tailor and scale communications support to enable Joint, Coalition, Wing, and Group-level elements.

=== 1980s ===
During the 1980s, MWCS-28 continued to enable our Corps' actions as a member of the Joint force. The Squadron continued to develop the concepts of employment associated with supporting Wing and Group-level elements while additionally developing the capability to support aviation elements afloat and aviation elements task-organized to support Marine Amphibious Brigades (MAB). The 1980s also saw a significant restructuring for the MWCS-28 organization, and that restructuring remains intact today.

In February 1984, MWCS-28 participated in "Operation Ocean Venture 82" at Roosevelt Roads Naval Station, Puerto Rico in support of Marine Aircraft Group 40 and the 4th MAB. Also in February, personnel and equipment were embarked aboard the USS Mt. Whitney, USS Charleston, USS Raleigh, USS Saipan, and the USS El Paso for transit to Northern Norway for participation in exercise "Busy Eagle/Team Work - 84." That same year MWCS-28 participated in five major exercises to include two Combined Arms Exercise (CAX 9/10) at Twenty Nine Palms, California and a Joint Chief of Staff-directed MAB-level exercise conducted in Florida ("Bold Eagle 86"), which successfully demonstrated the Marine Corps' capability to interface data communications with Air Force systems.

In 1985, the Squadron executed the 2d Marine Aircraft Wing's Communication Reorganization, directed in 1981 by the 2d Marine Aircraft Wing Commanding General, Major General Keith Smith. During this reorganization, the communications detachments supporting the Marine Air Groups at MCAS New River, NC (Detachment Alpha) and MCAS Beaufort, SC (Detachment Bravo) were assigned to the operational control of MWCS-28 Headquarters located at MCAS Cherry Point. This reorganization centralized the Wing's capability to provide communications links from the MAW Headquarters to each of the 2d Marine Aircraft Wing's Marine Aircraft Groups (MAGs) at each of 2d MAW's Air Stations.

MWCS-28's experience in providing communication support to Joint, Coalition, and Wing-level elements would pay dividends in the 1990s. The exercises supported by the Squadron during the 1980s developed the concepts of employment associated with providing smaller, task-organized detachments to Brigades, Groups, and amphibious assets.

=== Operation DESERT SHIELD / Operation DESERT STORM ===
The successes Detachments "A" and "B" achieved during their support of numerous exercises in the 1960s, 1970s, and 1980s would be leveraged for greater success in support of major combat operations during Operation DESERT SHIELD and Operation DESERT STORM.

In August 1990, Iraq invaded the sovereign nation of Kuwait, and MWCS-28, Detachment A (-) immediately deployed with Marine Aircraft Group 40 aboard the USS Nassau, an LHA-4, and the USS Iwo Jima, an LHA-2. Four months later, on 10 December, Detachment B (Fwd) deployed to the Persian Gulf for Al-Jubail, Saudi Arabia. Detachment B (Fwd) remained at Al-Jubail until 26 December when they moved to Ras al-Mishab where they established two multichannel links - linking General Support Group (GSG) to the Wing's Tactical Air Operations Center, and also linking the Tactical Air Operations Center to the Direct Support Center. On 1 Jan 1991, the remainder of Detachment B arrived in Ras al-Mishab, and prepared to support Marine Aircraft Group 26's movement to Lonesome Dove, the largest rotary aircraft base in Marine Corps history, housing approximately 200 aircraft. Detachment B established links between Marine Aircraft Group 26 and the Early Warning Center and Direct Support Center. These links tied together the Marine Air Command and Control System in support of air campaign and ground war during Operation Desert Shield and Operation Desert Storm. Throughout the conduct of the ground war, Detachment A (-) remained embarked while preparing to support aviation operations ashore during an amphibious assault.

=== The 1990s: Resetting the Force and Continued Support to Global Security ===
In the 1990s, small detachments of MWCS-28 Marines were deployed all over the world, while the Squadron continued to restructure itself in order to provide the highest degree of communications support to 2d MAW and the Wing's task-organized element.

On 23 November 1991, Detachment A sent 9 Marines to support the Marine Corps' humanitarian assistance operations in Haiti during Operation GITMO. And, on 11 December 1992, 11 MWCS-28 Marines deployed to Somalia with I Marine Expeditionary Force in support of Operation RESTORE HOPE.

In 1992, MWCS-28's Commanding Officer, LtCol Washburn, implemented the Marine Corps' directed Table of Organization change, eliminating the two Detachments, each located at MCAS Beaufort and MCAS New River. The deactivation of Detachment A and Detachment B at their respective Air Stations was conducted in order to consolidate the Squadron's equipment and personnel at MCAS Cherry Point. During this period, the Squadron continued to support 2d MAW's elements during the normal tempo of operations, though it was at 50% of its original strength.

In 1993, the Squadron sent 92 Marines to Fort McCoy, Wisconsin for participation in "Alpine Warrior 93", supported Weapons and Tactics Instructor Course 1–93 in Yuma, Arizona, deployed 88 Marines to Puerto Rico for two weeks to support a Command Post Exercise, and then a majority of the Squadron deployed with MAG-40 to Norway for "Battle Griffin 93" in February.

On 21 September 1994, the Squadron completed the activities associated with consolidating its two detachments at MCAS Cherry Point, and officially reorganized as a Headquarters Detachment and two operational Detachments, all located at MCAS Cherry Point. This consolidation allowed the Squadron to supervise the collective training development and to manage the force provision of the two independent detachments. During the course of the next year, the Squadron participated in numerous exercises to include two Joint Systems Training Exercises JSTE 95-01/02, CAX 3/4-95, "Iron Ace 95", and "Roving Sands 95".

In November 1999, after supporting four real-world operations, 18 major exercises, 19 local exercises, and supporting six Marine Expeditionary Unit-Special Operations Capable detachments, MWCS-28 was presented the Meritorious Unit Citation (MUC) by CG 2d MAW, MajGen Krupp.

The 1990s saw the Squadron's participation in an ever-increasing variety of missions. Ranging from the arid deserts of the American Southwest, to the arctic tundra of Norway, the rainforests of South America, and the littorals of the Mediterranean, MWCS-28 continued to develop new concepts of employment to support 2d MAW and the Marine Corps. Also engaged in supporting new technologies, in 1995 MWCS-28 implemented routers as elements of the communications infrastructure to support providing wide area network (WAN) and local area network (LAN) services to 2d MAW's users.

=== The New Century: Y2K, Operation IRAQI FREEDOM and Operation ENDURING FREEDOM ===
The beginning of the 21st Century saw MWCS-28 continue to adjust their organizational structure to provide the highest degree of operational readiness and support to 2d MAW and the II MEF MAGTF. The Squadron also continued to support the implementation and operation and maintenance of new and emerging technologies.

At the turn of the century, 9 Marines from MWCS-28, Alpha Company, supported the Year 2000 (Y2K) Response Cell. These teams ensured that the Marines Corps continued to have positive communication with MCAS Cherry Point, NC and MCAS Beaufort, SC during the Y2K transition. These 9 Marines tested over 2,500 personal computers, 100 servers, 15 routers, and 60 switches for Y2K deficiencies.

On the first day of the year 2000, MWCS-28 officially re-designated Alpha, Bravo, and Headquarters and Service Detachments as Alpha, Bravo, and Headquarters & Service Companies.

From 5 May to 10 June 2000, B Company (Rein) deployed communications equipment and personnel to Hellenic Army Base (Camp Sparta), Assiros Greece, and Macedonia Airfield, Thessinoliki Greece to support MAG-26 during "Dynamic Mix 00". During the exercise, 115 Marines were deployed to four geographically separate sites where the Marines provided links on 2d MEB's communications architecture. AN/TRC-170s and AN/MRC-142s provided long haul connectivity, while AN/TTC-42s and SB-3865s provided telephone and switching services.

On 22 April 2002, following the 11 September 2001 attacks, 9 MWCS-28 Marines deployed in support of Operation ENDURING FREEDOM (OEF). Again, on 27 August 2002, 4 more Marines deployed with MACS-2 to support OEF.

=== Operation IRAQI FREEDOM ===
In early 2003, in support of Operation IRAQI FREEDOM, MWCS-28 provided Marines for MAG-29, as part of Task Force Tarawa and ATF East. MWCS-28 also provided a 10-Marine communications detachment to Marine Aviation Logistics Squadron 14 for duty aboard the East Coast T-AVB, the SS Wright, T-AVB-3.

Arriving in the Middle East in February, the majority of the Squadron deployed to and staged at Ali Al Salem Airbase while the Operations Section co-located with 3d MAW G-6 and MWCS-38 at Al Jaber Airbase. During March, the Squadron began to reposition itself for movement from Kuwait into Iraq. The Squadron provided a detachment to the Jalibah Forward Operating Base (JFOB), the QFSARP detachment, and the AFOB detachment. On 21 March 2003, the JFOB advance party, JFOB main body, and the QFARP detachment crossed the border moved into Iraq with their respective convoys. The Squadron Commanding Officer, LtCol Kenyon M. Gill, moved with the JFOB Main Body to its destination in Jalibah.

The JFOB Detachment began establishing its network at Jalibah via TRC-170, and within 14 hours provided the commander's information requirements. The network included 6 multi-channel AN/TRC-170 links, 5 multi-channel AN/MRC-142 links, 5 tactical telephone switches, 180 tactical phones, 645 SIPRNET accounts, 860 NIPRNET accounts, and 23 radio nets. MWCS-28 provided communications support to MAGs 29 and 16 along with their subordinate Squadrons and MWSS-373, MALS, VMU, EWC, and ATC.

The QFARP Detachment followed in trace of Task Force Tarawa. This detachment established a critical AN/TRC-170 retransmission site, between Jalibah and An Numaniyah while providing services to VMU-1 on two separate occasions, and to MWSS-371.

LtCol Kenyon M. Gill and the AFOB Detachment followed in trace of the 1st Marine Division. On 25 March, the detachment stopped at FOB An Numaniyah, Iraq, and within 11 hours the AFOB detachment installed 2 AN/TRC-170s to Qalat Sikar, 2 to Salman Pak, and 1 to Task Force Tarawa; 7 AN/MRC-142s links, 4 tactical telephone switches, 96 tactical phones, 400 SIPRNET accounts, and over 60 NIPRNET accounts. The AFOB Marines provided support to MAGs 39 and 13 and their subordinate Squadrons, MWSS-271, MALS, EWC, ATC, VMU 1 and 2, Patriot HQs Battery, 1st FSSG Med Bn, 8th ESB, SEAL Team 3, and CSSB-12.

MWCS-28's participation in Operation IRAQI FREEDOM during 2003 provided three crucial and timely communications nodes at Jalibah, Qalat Sikar, and An Numaniyah for 3d MAW, TF Tarawa, and 1st Marine Division in order to enable the command and control for the Marine Corps during major combat operations. Following combat operations in 2003, from 2004 to 2008, MWCS-28 consistently deployed more than 50% in support of OIF 04-06, 05-07, 06-08, 07-09. During this period, the Squadron continued to support 2d MAW training exercises, Marine Expeditionary Units, and Weapons and Tactics Instructor Courses.

In 2007, MWCS-28 was recognized as the most outstanding communications unit in the Marine Corps, receiving the LtCol Kevin M. Shea award, only the second unit in the Marine Corps to receive this distinction.

In 2009, MWCS-28 simultaneously provided support to both Operation IRAQI FREEDOM and Operation ENDURING FREEDOM. In January, Company A deployed to support Operation IRAQI FREEDOM, and in April, Company B deployed in support of MEB-Afghanistan to support of the expansion of the Operation ENDURING FREEDOM mission. Alpha Company returned in October ending six straight years of MWCS-28 support to Operation IRAQI FREEDOM. And in November 2009, the second increment of Company B personnel deployed to Operation ENDURING FREEDOM 10.2.

As in recent and distant years past, the Squadron, while supporting the Marine Corps' operational commitments in support of Operation IRAQI FREEDOM and Operation ENDURING FREEDOM, continued to support aviation logistics exercises (T-AVB), Marine Expeditionary Units, MACCS Integrated Simulated Training Exercises (MISTEXs), as well as Weapons and Tactics Instructor Courses, and Wing-level Large Scale Exercises.

=== Marine Aircraft Group 40 ===
In September 2012, 80 MWCS-28 Marines deployed to Kuwait and Bahrain as part of MAG-40. MAG-40 was a composite air group of 500 Marines consisting of F/A 18D and KC-130 Squadrons with a Marine Wing Support Squadron and Marine Aviation Logistics element, which all supported Theater Security Cooperation activities for the USCENTCOM commander. The Squadron's Marines installed a Standard Tactical Entry Point (STEP) communication node that provided the gateway to secure and non-secure web, email, and voice services to MAG-40 and for elements entering the Persian Gulf region in support of the USCENTCOMM commander.

=== Operation ENDURING FREEDOM ===
From November 2010 until January 2013, MWCS-28 provided forces to Operation ENDURING FREEDOM. As the mission in support of Operation ENDURING FREEDOM expanded, the size of the detachments expanded, and as the mission contracted so did the detachment's size. In February 2011, Company A deployed 120 Marines as part of Operation ENDURING FREEDOM 11.1, Company B supported the OEF 11.2 Detachment with 120 Marines, Company B supported the OEF 13.1 Detachment with 33 Marines, and in January 2013, Company A deployed 33 Marines in July as part of the last MWCS-28 detachment supporting Operation ENDURING FREEDOM, MWCS-28 OEF Det 13.2. During a majority of the Squadron's deployment time in support of Operation ENDURING FREEDOM, the Detachments provided the Regional Command (Southwest)'s alternate STEP access for the MAGTF's area of operations. In addition to supporting 2d MAW elements and airfields at FOBs Camp Leatherneck, Camp Dwyer, and Kandahar Airfield, the Squadron's Marines supported thousands of users, combat missions, and sorties for members of ground forces, combat service support forces, interagency, Joint, and coalition elements.

=== Special Purpose Marine Air Ground Task Force – Crisis Response ===
In July 2013, MWCS-28 deployed a 29-Marine detachment in support of Special Purpose Marine Air Ground Task Force-Crisis Response (SPMAGTF-CR) Command Element. SPMAGTF-CR was staged in Moron, Spain in response to the 2012 attack on the American Embassy in Benghazi, Libya. Operating outside of their traditional MWCS-28 mission, these Marines gave the SPMAGTF-CR the ability to install a forward command element in support of Theater Security Cooperation, Embassy Reinforcement, and Non-combatant Evacuation Operations. The MWCS-28 Marines provided secure and non-secure web, email, and voice services via a Standard Tactical Entry Point to extend the digital backbone to Forward Arming and Refueling Points, Forward Operating Bases, and Logistical Support Areas established by the ACE. Marines from the MWCS-28 detachment also deployed with the ground force within Spain, France and with forward elements posted at American embassies in Northern Africa and a forward command post in Italy.

=== Enabling the Combat Power of the MAGTF ===
From 2010 to 2013, countless Marines have acted as individual augments in support of various operational commitments and units in the USCENTCOM and USAFRICOM AOR. These units include MACG-28 (Fwd), 2d MAW (Fwd), MEF Headquarters Group (Fwd), II MEF (Fwd), Marine Forces Central Command (Fwd), and Redeployment and Retrograde in Support of Reset and Reconstitution Operations Group (R4OG), and Regimental Combat Team 2. In support of enduring commitments in the USAFRICOM AOR, one Marine was deployed to Monrovia, Liberia for Operation ONWARD LIBERTY. As the Squadron has continued to maintain forces deployed in support of Operation ENDURING FREEDOM, Marine Expeditionary Units, and SPMAGTFs, the Marines of MWCS-28 continually provide the most available Forces and high-degree of communications availability in order to enable the combat power of the MAGTF.

In February 2014, MWCS-28 was recognized as the most outstanding communications unit in the Marine Corps, receiving the LtCol Kevin M. Shea award for the third time. MWCS-28 was the only unit in the Marine Corps to receive this recognition three times, and the only unit to earn it in back-to-back years.

== See also ==
- United States Marine Corps Aviation
- Organization of the United States Marine Corps
- List of United States Marine Corps aviation support units

== Notes ==
- The Marines of MWCS-28 hold a bi-annual "Spartan Cup", a day long event of combined athletics and tests of strength.
