= Walter L. J. Bayler =

United States Marine Corps general

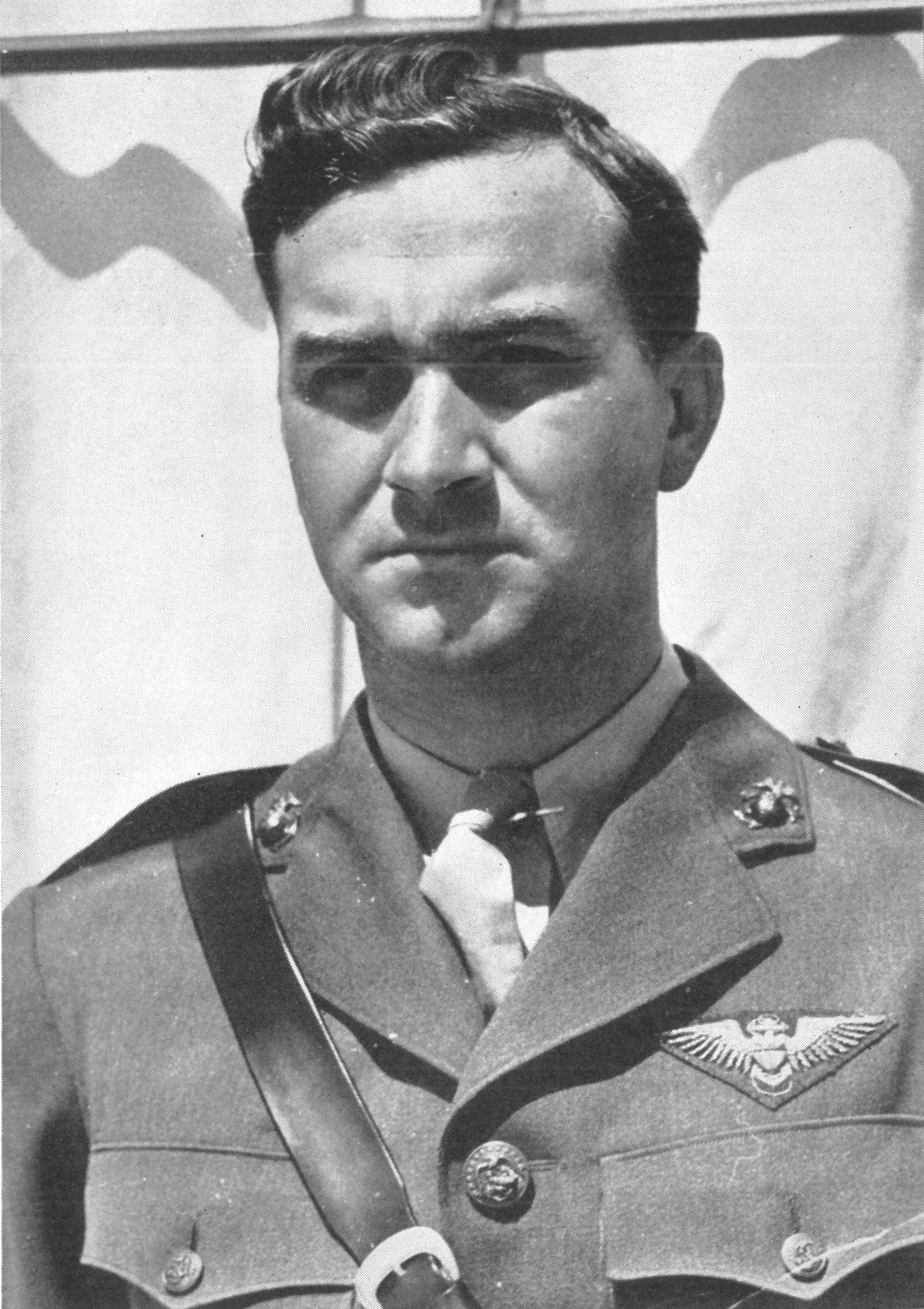
- Born: April 8, 1905; Lebanon, Pennsylvania, US
- Died: December 8, 1984 (aged 79); Tustin, California, US
- Burial place: Riverside National Cemetery
- Military career
- Allegiance: United States
- Branch: United States Marine Corps
- Service years: 1927–1957
- Rank: Brigadier general
- Commands: 3rd Marine Aircraft Wing; 1st Marine Air Warning Group
- Conflicts: Banana Wars; Occupation of Nicaragua; World War II; Battle of Wake Island; Battle of Midway; Guadalcanal campaign
- Awards: Legion of Merit

Walter Lewis John Bayler (8 April 1905 – 8 December 1984) was a brigadier general in the United States Marine Corps who was famed during World War II as the "Last Man Off Wake Island" and the only American to see combat at Wake Island, Midway and Guadalcanal. A naval aviator and communications engineer, he was at the forefront of the Marine Corps' use of radar for early warning and fighter direction. He was one of the driving forces behind the Marine Corps' establishment of an air warning program and served as the first commanding officer of the 1st Marine Air Warning Group (1st MAWG).

After the war, Colonel Bayler served as the Commander of the 3rd Marine Aircraft Wing and Marine Corps Air Station El Toro, California. He retired in 1957 settling in Orange County, California. He worked for Hughes Aircraft Company for a time before later teaching high school physics. BGen Bayler died on 8 December 1984.

== Early years ==
Born 8 April 1905, in Lebanon, Pennsylvania Walter Bayler graduated from Lebanon High School in June 1923 and was selected to attend the United States Naval Academy.

== Nicaragua and the 1930s ==
Upon graduation from the Naval Academy, he was commissioned a second lieutenant in the United States Marine Corps on 21 June 1927. He subsequently entered the Basic Class at Marine Barracks Philadelphia and graduated in January 1928. He sailed for Nicaragua that same month to serve with the 2nd Marine Brigade until his return in February 1929. While in Nicaragua he commanded the 49th Company of Horse Marines for eight months. This was a mounted cavalry unit that could swiftly deploy to problem areas. Upon his return he attended pre-flight training at Marine Corps Base Quantico, Virginia, and entered flight training at Naval Air Station Pensacola, Florida in May 1929. He earned his wings as a naval aviator in January 1930. He served at Quantico from February 1930 until May 1931. At that time he was selected to attend Naval Postgraduate School at Annapolis, Maryland, and in August 1932 he attended further post-graduate school at Harvard University. He graduated from Harvard in June 1933 with a master's degree in communications engineering.

In July 1933, he became the communications and navigation officer with VS-15M on board the USS Lexington (CV-2) and served in a similar capacity with Aircraft Two while stationed at Naval Air Station San Diego from June 1937 until August 1939.

== World War II ==
=== Pre-war ===
From August 1939 until May 1940, then Captain Bayler attended Amphibious Warfare School at MCB Quantico, VA. After graduation he returned to the west coast to serve as the communications and radio officer for Marine Aircraft Group 21 (MAG-21). He sailed with the group in January 1941 when they were transferred to Hawaii.

=== Duties on Wake Island ===
On 20 November 1941, Maj Bayler and 48 Marines from MAG-21 departed Pearl Harbor on board the USS Wright (AV-1) bound for Wake Island. Arriving 29 November, their mission was to establish facilities at the airfield for air-ground radio communications. Within three days of their arrival they had completed their radio station in a tent in a large parking area just off the main runway. During this time he worked very closely with Captain Winfield S. Cunningham, overall garrison commander, Major James P. Devereux commanding the island's 1st Defense Battalion detachment and Major Paul A. Putnam, in command of VMF-211. During the battle, Bayler provided rudimentary fighter direction without the aid of radar. He relayed observation reports from Marine spotters to Marine fighters overhead in their combat air patrol.

Bayler had follow on orders to report to Midway by first available air transport to carry out the same mission there. On the evening of 20 December, a United States Navy PBY Catalina landed in Wake's lagoon. When it departed the next morning, Maj Bayler was on board cementing him as the "Last Man Off Wake Island." At the time it was imperative for the Marine Corps to get Maj Bayler off of Wake Island because he was one of the few Marine Corps officers that had experience establishing air-ground communications networks and he was knowledgeable of the still top secret radar program within the United States. Two days later on 23 December 1941, Wake Island fell to the Japanese with all members of the garrison either killed, wounded or taken prisoners of war for the remainder of World War II

=== Midway Island and Hawaii ===
After departing Wake Island, Maj Bayler arrived at Midway Atoll and quickly joined the growing Marine Aviation Detachment there under the command of LtCol William J. Wallace. His task was to again establish air-ground radio communications however he also assisted the 6th Defense Battalion with the installation and operation of their newly acquired early warning radars. Bayler departed Midway on 20 April 1942 bound for Hawaii. He was promoted to lieutenant colonel in August 1942.

=== Defense of Guadalcanal ===
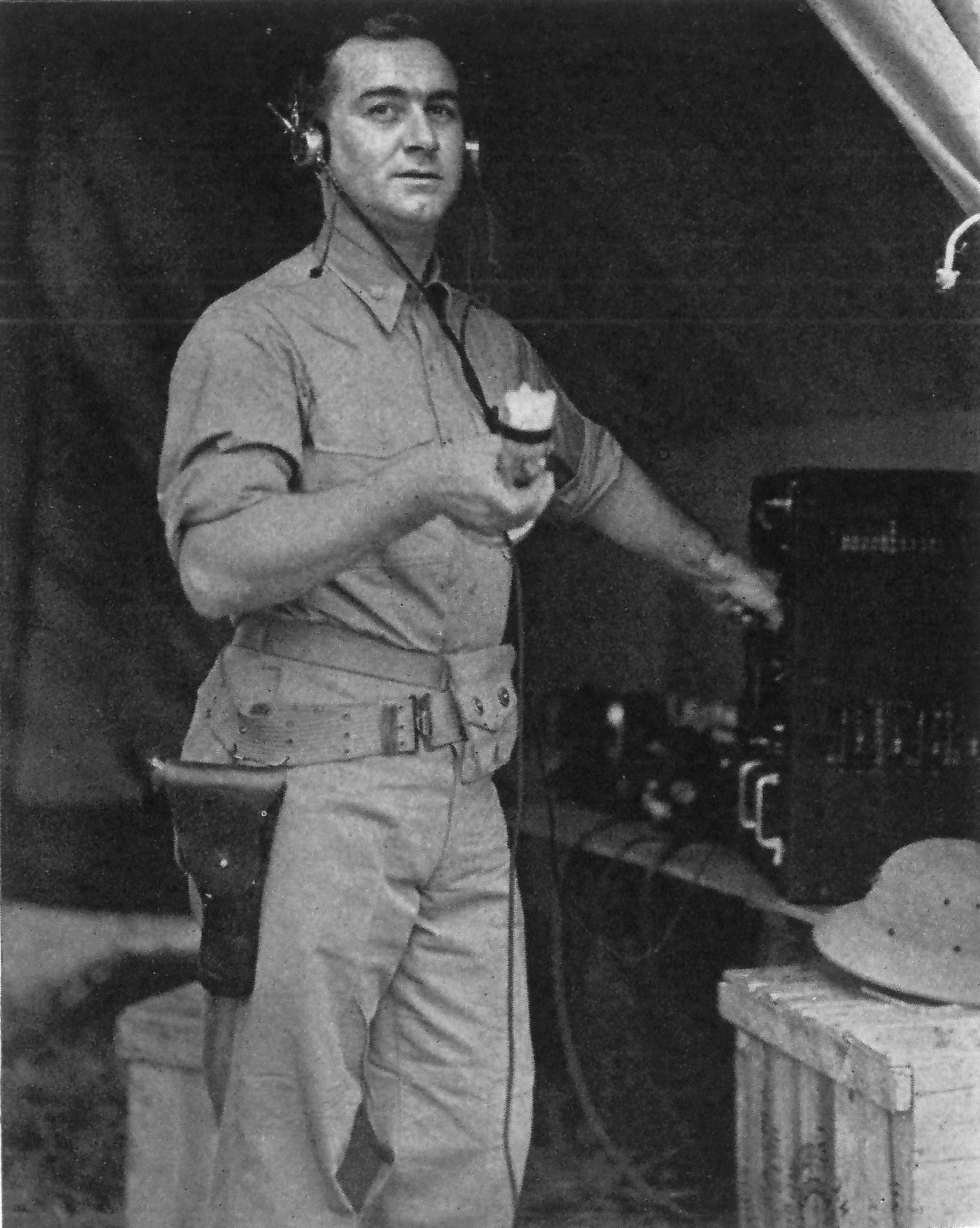
LtCol Walter Bayler controlling fighters from his communications station on Guadalcanal.

Bayler flew into Guadalcanal himself piloting a Grumman J2F Duck on 29 August 1942. Serving as the communications officer for Marine Aircraft Group 23, his mission once again was to establish air-to-ground communications facilities. On Guadalcanal he also established an early version of a TACAN to guide friendly aircraft back to Henderson Field. When the SCR-270 long range radar arrived on 20 September 1942, LtCol Bayler took over the radar detachment and began providing fighter direction. This radar and the early warning that it provided were critical to the success of the Cactus Air Force and the battle for Guadalcanal during the early stages of the campaign. The radar picked up incoming aircraft over New Georgia giving Marine fliers enough advanced warning that they did not need to maintain a constant combat air patrol. This allowed the 1st Marine Aircraft Wing to husband its resources at a time when aircraft and parts were difficult to attain. Radar operators passed distance and bearing information to Bayler at his communications facility via telephone and he then relayed this information to Marine fighter pilots overhead in their F4F Wildcats. From his communications room he could also deconflict fighter aircraft from the anti-aircraft guns of the 3rd Defense Battalion. Bayler and his team assisted interdiction efforts against the Tokyo Express by relaying critical real-time information on Japanese shipping to US aircraft. They also coordinated aviation assets during the rescue mission to save personnel in Ironbottom Sound after the USS Little (DD-79) and USS Gregory (DD-82) were sunk in September/October 1942. Bayler departed Guadalcanal on 5 November 1942.

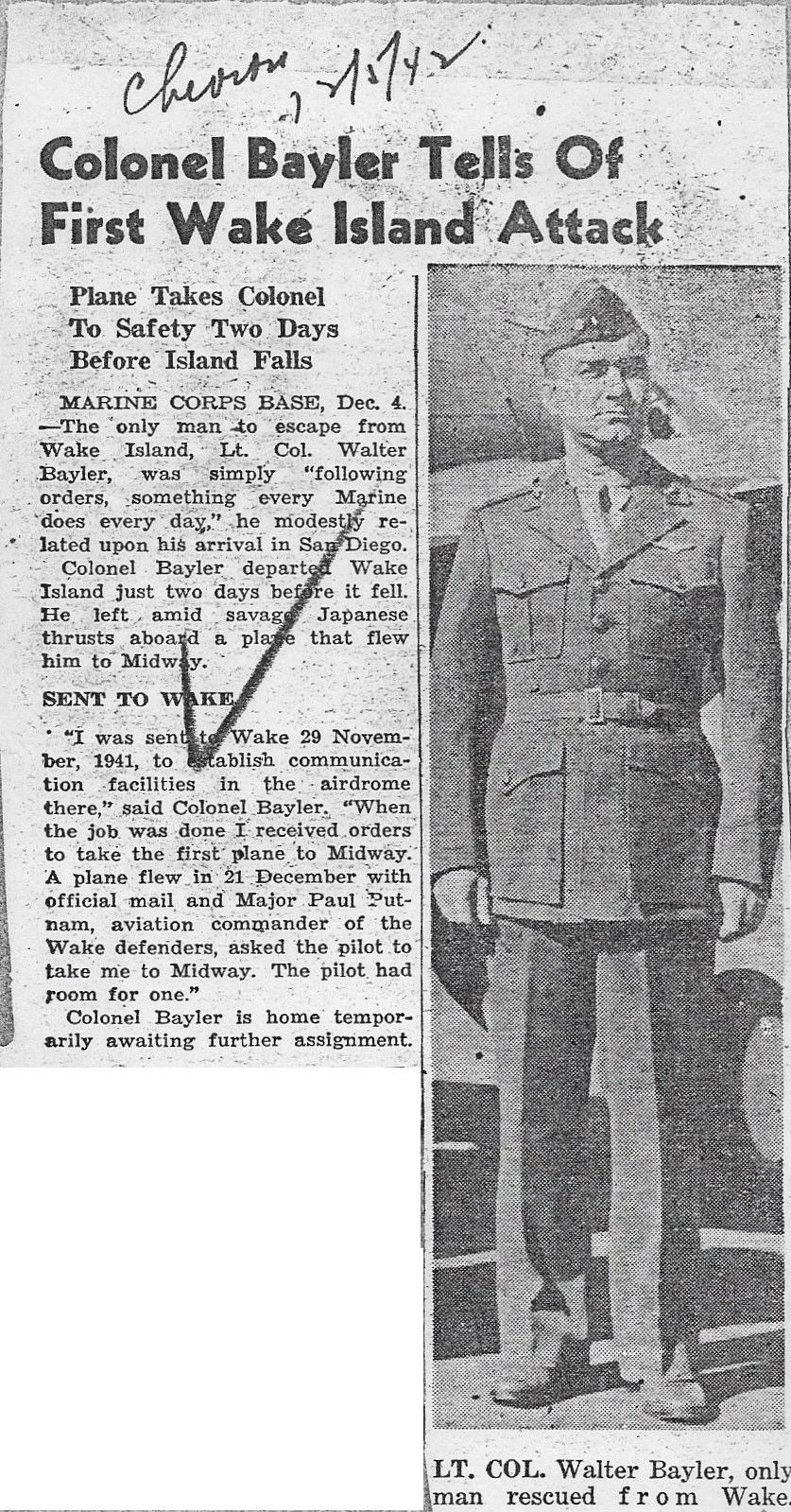
Newspaper clipping about Walter Bayler.

=== Establishment of the Air Warning Program ===
Upon his return from Guadalcanal, LtCol Bayler served as the commanding officer of the newly formed Marine Aircraft Group 34 at Marine Corps Air Station Cherry Point, North Carolina from February to April 1943. During this time he also sat as the senior member of a Radar Policy Board convened by the Commandant of the Marine Corps beginning on 11 February 1943. The board was tasked to make recommendations regarding the establishment of an adequate radar warning program, radar fire control and radar fighter direction for Marine Corps units during amphibious operations. Board recommendations included the organization of Air Warning Squadrons, placing organic fighter direction with night fighter squadrons and the creation of an Air Defense Section within the Division of Aviation at Headquarters Marine Corps. During this time in 1943, Bayler also co-authored a popular book titled Last Man Off Wake Island with Cecil Carnes. The book detailed his experiences on Wake, Midway and Guadalcanal early in the war.

On 1 July 1943, Col Bayler took command of the newly formed 1st Marine Air Warning Group (1st MAWG) at MCAS Cherry Point, NC. 1st MAWG's mission was to organize, train, and equip Air Warning Squadrons capable of setting up and maintaining expedient air defense systems to furnish early warning and fighter direction against enemy aircraft. He remained the commanding officer until 4 April 1944 at which time he was transferred to Headquarters Marine Corps, Division of Aviation to continue to develop requirements for the ever burgeoning air warning program.

=== 1944-45 in the Pacific ===
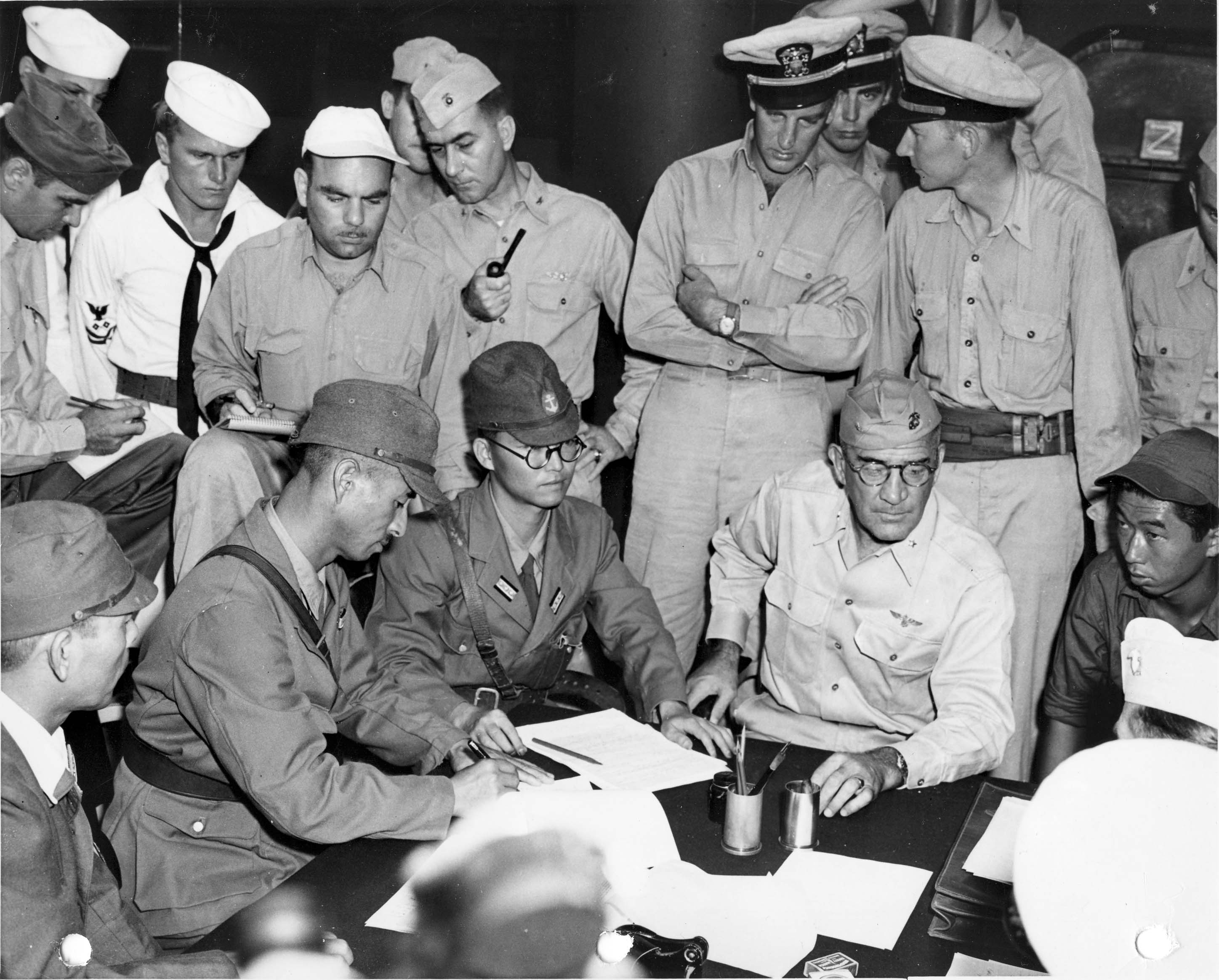
Col Bayler, holding the pipe in background, witnesses the Japanese surrender on Wake Island, 4 September 1945

Colonel Bayler returned to the Pacific in December 1944 as the chief of staff for the rear echelon of the 4th Marine Aircraft Wing. In this assignment he was based at Majuro Atoll and Kwajalein Atoll. From May 1945 through March 1946 he served as the assistant chief of staff, G-1, for Aircraft, Fleet Marine Force Pacific. Following the Japanese surrender in August 1945, Col Bayler, The Last Man Off Wake Island, became the first American to set foot back on the island when he came ashore on 4 September 1945 as part of the American delegation accepting the surrender of the Japanese Garrison.

== Post-war billets ==
He returned to Washington, D.C., in March 1946 to serve as the director of the Electronics Division, Bureau of Aeronautics, Navy Department until August 1948. He then attended the National War College until June 1949. His next assignment was as the officer in charge of the Aviation Section, Marine Corps Schools at MCB Quantico, VA. During this time he was also a member of board chaired by Major General Oliver P. Smith which recommended an expansion of the Marine Corps' newly developed helicopter program in order to advance emerging concepts in landing force techniques.

In December 1951, Col Bayler served as commanding general and later assistant wing commander for the 3rd Marine Aircraft Wing (3d MAW) at MCAS Cherry Point, North Carolina. He remained with 3d MAW when the Wing moved to Marine Corps Air Station Miami, Florida in February 1952. In August 1954, Colonel Bayler was assigned as the assistant chief of staff, G-2 and Station Inspector for Marine Corps Air Station El Toro, California. In June 1955 he became the chief of staff of the Air Station until his retirement.

== Retirement, death and legacy ==
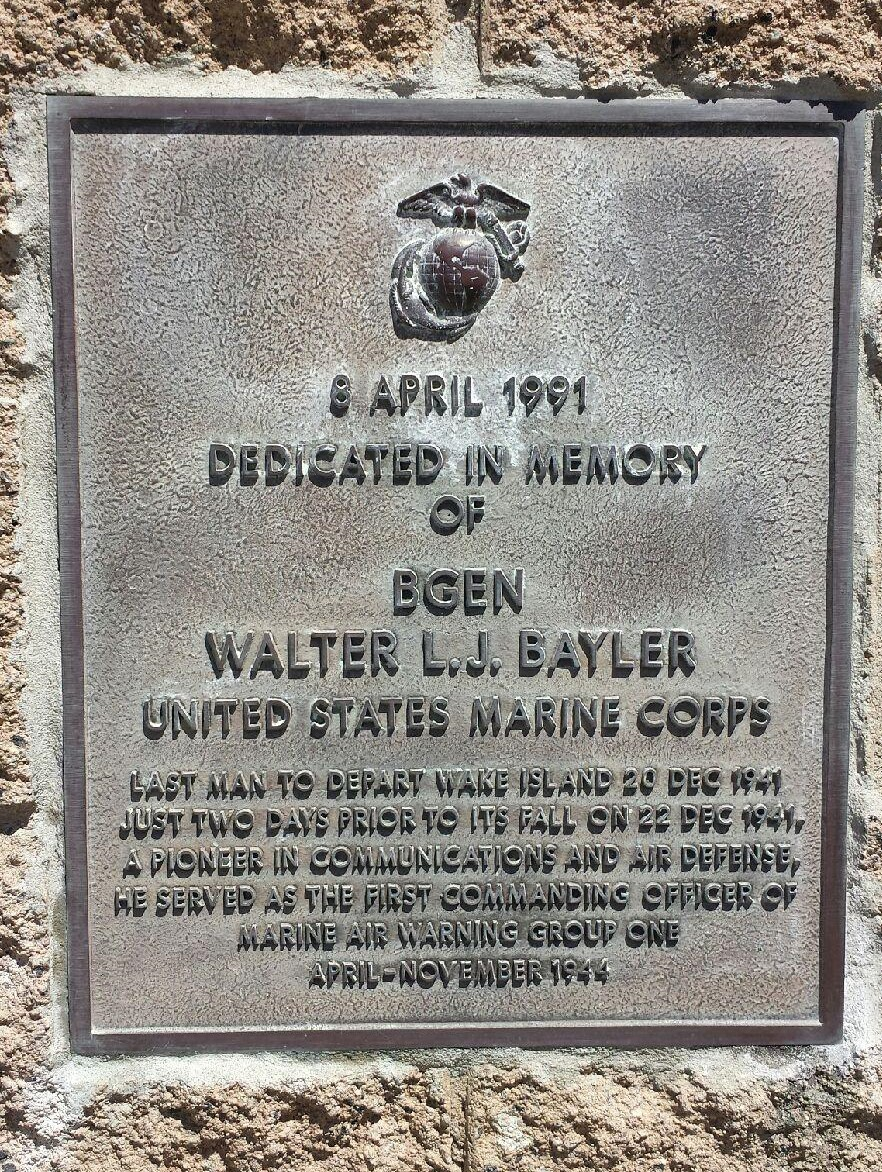
Plaque dedicating the MASS-3 headquarters building on Marine Corps Base Camp Pendleton in the name of BGen Walter L.J. Bayler.

Brigadier General Walter Bayler retired from active duty on 30 June 1957. He was advanced to the rank of brigadier general upon retirement because of his demonstrated heroism in combat. For his first five years out of uniform, he worked in production control management for the Hughes Aircraft Company in Fullerton and later Newport Beach. After his time with Hughes he earned his teaching certificate at Chapman College and taught physics at Sunny Hills High School in Fullerton for another 10 years. BGen Bayler died on 8 December 1984 in Tustin, California, and is buried in Riverside National Cemetery. He was survived by his wife, Virginia Katherine Bayler, daughter Virginia Marie who was married to Marine Corps MajGen Hal W. Vincent and three grandchildren.

The headquarters for Marine Air Control Squadron 1 (MACS-1) at the 32 Area on Marine Corps Base Camp Pendleton, California was named in honor of BGen Bayler on 9 July 1990. Today, that building is the Headquarters for Marine Air Support Squadron 3 (MASS-3).

== Medals and decorations ==
Here is the ribbon bar of Brigadier General Walter L. J. Bayler:

=== Legion of Merit citation ===
For extra exceptionally meritorious conduct in the performance of outstanding service to the Government of the United States, as Group Communications Officer and Assistant Group Operations Officer on Guadalcanal, Solomon Islands, from August 30 to September 22, 1942. Arriving by air with the rear echelon of a Marine Aircraft Group on August 30, Lieutenant Colonel Bayler, with little equipment and personnel, and often working alone, reestablished the existing communications facilities in order to operate additional aircraft successfully. Through his special ability, given determination and outstanding devotion to duty, he maintained communications in spite of the many failures caused by enemy bombings and shellings.
