= Marine Aviation Logistics Squadron 14 =

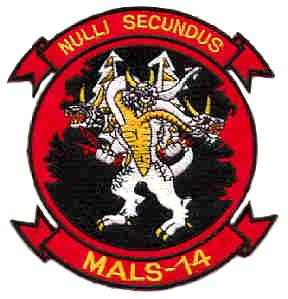
- MALS-14 insignia
- Country: United States
- Allegiance: United States of America
- Branch: United States Marine Corps
- Type: Logistics
- Role: Aviation logistics support
- Part of: Marine Aircraft Group 14; 2nd Marine Aircraft Wing
- Garrison/HQ: Marine Corps Air Station Cherry Point
- Nickname: Dragons
- Mottos: "Nulli Secundus" "Second to None"
- Engagements: Operation Desert Storm; Operation Enduring Freedom; Operation Iraqi Freedom

Commanders
- Current commander: LtCol Nicholas B. Verta

Marine Aviation Logistics Squadron 14 (MALS-14) is an aviation logistics support unit of the United States Marine Corps. They are currently based at Marine Corps Air Station Cherry Point and fall under the command of Marine Aircraft Group 14 (MAG-14) and the 2nd Marine Aircraft Wing (2nd MAW).

== Mission ==
To provide aviation logistics support, guidance, and direction to MAG-14 squadrons including intermediate level maintenance for aircraft and aeronautical components, first degree repair on J-52 and F-402 engines, aviation supply support for aircraft and navy-funded equipment, and Class V (A) ammunition logistics support.

== History ==
On 30 September 1988, Headquarters & Maintenance Squadron 14 (H&MS-14) was redesignated as Marine Aviation Logistics Squadron 14 (MALS-14). The squadron served as the test bed for the Naval Aviation Logistics Command Management Information System (NALCOMIS). With the successful realization of NALCOMIS prototype in December 1988, the NALCOMIS program interface with the Shipboard Uniform Automated Data Processing. System-Real Time (SUADPS-RT) was implemented. On 27 August 1990, MALS-14 FWD deployed to Southwest Asia aboard the SS Wright. Moored at Bahrain, MALS-14 FWD provided logistical support to the 4th Marine Expeditionary Brigade and elements of the I Marine Expeditionary Force. In December 1990, MALS-14 FWD was transferred to the 3rd Marine Aircraft Wing for duty to support Marine Aircraft Group 13 (MAG-13) at King Abdul Aziz Naval Base, Saudi Arabia.

The support provided to MAG-13 FWD contributed to the group having the highest aircraft readiness rates for a Marine unit in SWA throughout Operation Desert Storm. In February 1991, MALS-14 established the first Fixed Wing Forward Armament and Refueling Point (FARP) in a combat zone at Tanagib, Saudi Arabia. Following the conflict, MALS-14 returned to MCAS Cherry Point on 1 April 1991. This concluded the first combat deployment for the Squadron since World War II.

In August 1991, the squadron was selected as the first winner of the Marine Corps Aviation Association's "MALS of the Year" Award. In June 1991, MALS-14 added another battle streamer to its colors with the Southwest Asia Service Medal. In February 1992, the Squadron was awarded the Navy Unit Commendation for meritorious service. MALS-14 provided the logistical coordination necessary for VMAQ-2's split into three squadrons and VMAQ-4's activation. They also continued to plan and execute logistics for the stand-down of three A-6E Intruder squadrons, and the corresponding introduction of three F/A-18 Hornet squadrons.

In accordance with Marine Corps force realignments, MALS-14, along with MALS-32, planned and executed the deactivation of MALS-32 and the transfer of MAG-32's remaining structure to MALS-14. The first half of 1993 was consumed by the merging of MALS-14 and 32's assets/personnel while simultaneously supporting deployment of squadrons throughout the world.

During 1995, the Marines of MALS-14 provided combat support for Operation Deny Flight. With the requirement for tactical electronic aerial warfare, Marine Tactical Electronic Warfare Squadrons, with EA-6B Prowlers played a vital role fulfilling that requirement and were deployed to Aviano Air Base, Italy to fly in support of Operations Deny Flight, Deliberate Forge, and Deliberate Guard.

Through 1996, MALS-14 continued to find itself deployed as their tactical squadrons flew in support of Operation Decisive Edge and Operation Assured Response. Near the end of the support for operations in Bosnia, MALS-14 prepared to stand down from those commitments and concentrate on Operation Northern Watch. With the requirement to support the no-fly zone in northern and southern Iraq, MALS-14 remained the lead support element for tactical electronic warfare squadrons.

On the heels of the Bosnia operation were combat support operations against Yugoslavia, particularly the province of Kosovo. Operations in Yugoslavia also saw the buildup of 22 EA-6B Prowlers to Aviano and MALS-14 personnel to support the increase in aircraft. The air war over the skies of the Former Republic of Yugoslavia became known as the Kosovo Campaign.

In July 1999, the last Marines returned from Aviano, Italy after successfully supporting the EA-6B Prowlers flying over the skies of the Former Republic of Yugoslavia. However, Marines supporting Marine Attack Squadrons attached to the 22nd, 24th, and 26th Marine Expeditionary Units continued to deploy to the Mediterranean and particularly the Balkans.

== See also ==
- United States Marine Corps Aviation
- Organization of the United States Marine Corps
- List of United States Marine Corps aviation support units
