= Marine Tactical Air Command Squadron 28 =

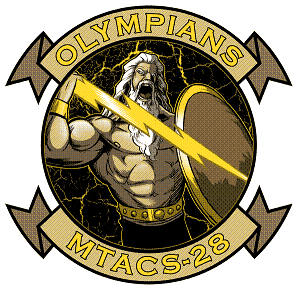
- MTACS-28 Insignia
- Active: 1 October 1947 – 18 November 2022
- Country: United States of America
- Branch: United States Marine Corps
- Role: Aviation command & control
- Part of: Marine Air Control Group 28; 2nd Marine Aircraft Wing
- Garrison/HQ: Marine Corps Air Station Cherry Point
- Nickname: Olympians
- Engagements: 'Operation Desert Storm; Operation Enduring Freedom; Operation Iraqi Freedom

Commanders
- Current commander: LtCol. Kyle P. Hahn

Marine Tactical Air Command Squadron 28 (MTACS-28) was a United States Marine Corps aviation command and control unit based at Marine Corps Air Station Cherry Point. They provided the 2nd Marine Aircraft Wings tactical headquarters and commanded other units within Marine Air Control Group 28. The unit was deactivated on 18 November 2022 as part of reshaping the United States Marine Corps.

== Mission ==
Provide equipment, maintenance, and operations for the Tactical Air Command Center (TACC) of the Aviation Combat Element (ACE), as a component of the Marine Air-Ground Task Force (MAGTF). Equip, man, operate, and maintain the Current Operations Section of the TACC. Provide and maintain a facility for the TACC Future Operations Section; and install and maintain Associated Automated Systems.

== History ==
Activated 1 October 1947 at Marine Corps Air Station Cherry Point, North Carolina as Headquarters Squadron 2, 2d Marine Aircraft Wing, Fleet Marine Force. Elements participated in Operation Desert Shield and Operation Desert Storm, Southwest Asia, August 1990 – March 1991

Re-designated 1 May 1993 as Marine Tactical Air Command Squadron 28, Marine Air Control Group 28, 2nd Marine Aircraft Wing, Fleet Marine Force, Atlantic.

Detachments and Elements Participated in Operation Enduring Freedom, Operation Southern Watch, Operation Iraqi Freedom.

This unit was officially decommissioned on November 18, 2022 with a ceremony held at Miller’s Landing on MCAS Cherry Point.

== Unit awards ==
A unit citation or commendation is an award bestowed upon an organization for the action cited. Members of the unit who participated in said actions are allowed to wear on their uniforms the awarded unit citation. MTACS-28 has been presented with the following awards:

Streamer	Award	Year(s)	Additional Info
	Joint Meritorious Unit Award Streamer		
A green streamer with red, gold, and blue horizontal stripes along the top and bottom with one silver star in the center	Navy Unit Commendation Streamer		
A green streamer with red, gold, and blue horizontal stripes and four stars in the center	Meritorious Unit Commendation Streamer with three Bronze Stars		
A red streamer with a horizontal gold stripe and three bronze stars in the center	National Defense Service Streamer with three Bronze Stars	1951–1954, 1961–1974, 1990–1995, 2001–present	Korean War, Vietnam War, Gulf War, war on terrorism
A multicolored streamer with (from outer to inner) green, red, black (the three colors of the Afghan flag), white, red, and white again horizontal stripes with a blue horizontal stripe in the center	Afghanistan Campaign Streamer with one bronze star		
A multicolored streamer with (from outer to inner) red, white, green, white again, black (the colors of the Iraqi flag) horizontal stripes with a yellow horizontal stripe in the center	Iraq Campaign Streamer with three bronze stars		
	Global War on Terrorism Expeditionary Streamer	2001–present	
A blue streamer with yellow, red, and white horizontal stripes	Global War on Terrorism Service Streamer	2001–present	

== See also ==
- United States Marine Corps Aviation
- Organization of the United States Marine Corps
- List of United States Marine Corps aviation support squadrons
