= 2nd Low Altitude Air Defense Battalion =

2d Low Altitude Air Defense Battalion
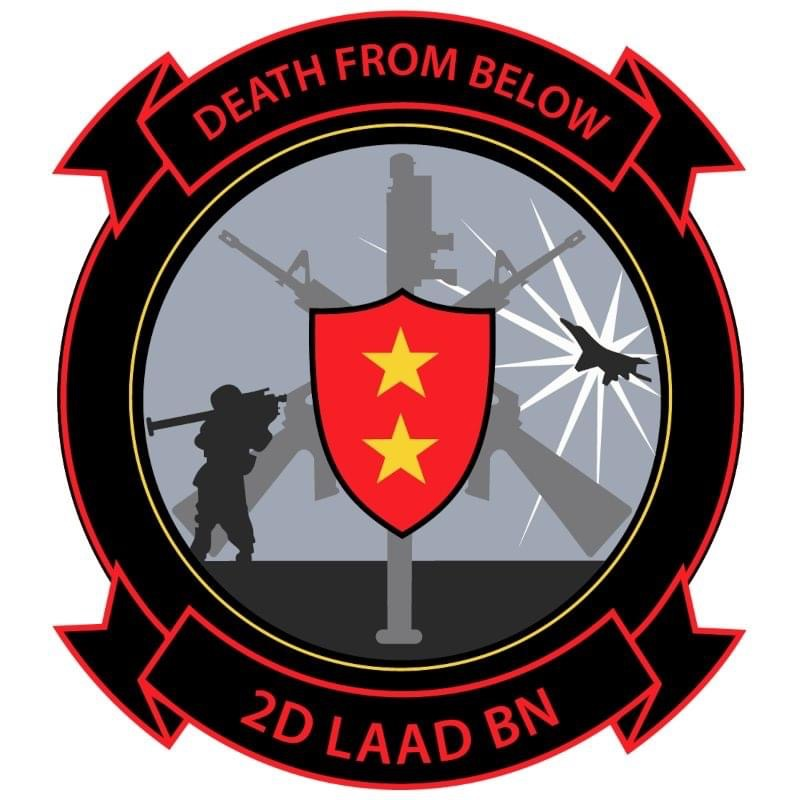
- 2d LAAD Insignia
- Active: 1 October 1983 — present
- Country: United States
- Branch: United States Marine Corps
- Type: Air Defense
- Role: Air Defense
- Part of: Marine Air Control Group 28; 2nd Marine Aircraft Wing
- Garrison/HQ: Marine Corps Air Station Cherry Point
- Nickname: 2nd LAAD
- Motto: "Death from Below"
- Engagements: Operation Desert Storm; Operation Iraqi Freedom; Operation Enduring Freedom

Commanders
- Current commander: LtCol Leonard J. Niedosik

The 2d Low Altitude Air Defense Battalion (2d LAAD) is an air defense unit of the United States Marine Corps. The battalion is subordinate to Marine Air Control Group 28 (MACG-28) and the 2nd Marine Aircraft Wing (2nd MAW) and is currently based at Marine Corps Air Station Cherry Point. The battalion is composed of one Headquarters and Support Battery and three Firing Batteries (Alpha, Bravo, and Charlie).

== Mission ==
Provide close-in, low altitude, surface-to-air weapons fires, in defense of Marine Air-Ground Task Force (MAGTF) assets by defending forward combat areas, maneuvering forces, vital areas, installations and/or units engaged in special/independent operations. Secondly, the battalion provides a task organized, ground security force in defense of MAGTF air sites, assets and installations when not engaged in air defense operations.

== History ==
=== Early years ===
On 26 February 1969, an official table of organization was established for the Forward Area Air Defense (FAAD) Platoon. As a result of a decision to group all anti-air warfare assets under the command and control of the tactical air commander, the 2d FAAD Platoon was transferred to Marine Air Control Group 28, 2nd Marine Aircraft Wing. From 1969 to 1983, 2d FAAD Platoon was assigned under the operational and administrative control of three commands: Headquarters and Headquarters Squadron 28, Marine Air Support Squadron 1, and the 3d Light Antiaircraft Missile Battalion (3rd LAAM). Based on a Headquarters Marine Corps initiative to strengthen close-in air defense assets in support of each Marine Air Ground Task Force, a decision was made to activate the 2d FAAD Battery, which eventually consisted of a service platoon and five firing platoons. 2d FAAD Battery was established as a separate unit under Marine Air Control Group 28 on 1 October 1983.

=== 1980s and 1990s ===
On 8 August 1986, the unit was expanded into a battalion comprising a headquarters and service battery, and two firing batteries. Since its activation, 2d LAAD Battalion has remained heavily committed around the globe. The battalion has continuously provided LAAD detachments to the 22nd, 24th and 26th Marine Expeditionary Units. Participating in numerous exercises from the Carolinas to California and numerous NATO exercise from Turkey to Northern Norway.

In August 1990, at the outset of the Iraqi invasion into Kuwait, the battalion deployed one firing battery in support of the 4th Marine Expeditionary Brigade, which immediately set sail to the Persian Gulf. Subsequently, the remainder of the battalion, augmented by a reserve firing battery from 4th Low Altitude Air Defense Battalion, deployed to Southwest Asia in January 1991 in support of Operation Desert Shield and Operation Desert Storm. The battalion was designated as the Marine Air Command and Control Systems Unit of the Year for 1991 and received the prestigious "Edward S. Fris Award". Following Desert Storm, detachments from the battalion participated in Operation Provide Comfort in Northern Iraq and Operation Safe Harbor in Guantanamo Bay, Cuba.

In 1999, 2d LAAD Battalion's 26th MEU Marines were first in the Marine Corps to take combat loaded M1097 Avengers into a combat environment during operation Operation Allied Force in Kosovo as well as participate in Operation Joint Guardian off Albania and Operation Avid Response in Turkey. During the operations in the Balkans, a section from 2d LAAD supported the 26th MEU and landed in Kosovo with the battalion landing team. The section provided air defense and perimeter security for the BLT against sniper attacks.

=== Global War on Terror ===
In September 2001, the battalion was again heavily deployed. A detachment from the battalion was part of the 26th Marine Expeditionary Unit and deployed ashore in support of combat operations in Pakistan and Afghanistan.

2d LAAD deployed as part of Task Force Tarawa in January 2003. LAAD teams were attached to 1st Battalion 2nd Marines, 2nd Battalion 3rd Marines, 3rd Battalion 2nd Marines, and the 11th Marine Regiment during the invasion of Iraq, 19 March 2003. Marines from 2d LAAD would take part in the battle of An Nasiriyah and other skirmishes in Al Kut, An Numaniyah, and other areas.

A detachment from the battalion was part of the 22nd Marine Expeditionary Unit and deployed ashore to Kandahar airfield, Afghanistan, in April, 2004 in support of Operation Mountain Storm.

During Operation Iraqi Freedom, 2d LAAD Bn was deployed to the Al Anbar Province in Iraq, and engaged in combat operations between February 2005 to September 2005. From February 2007 to November 2007, 2d LAAD Bn conducted combat and support operations within the al Anbar Governorate in the role of a Provisional Security Battalion aboard and around Al Asad Airbase. From April 2008 to October 2008, 2d LAAD Bn would again deploy to Iraq and this time provide support and security operations aboard Al Taqaddum Airbase.

In 2010 the battalion deployed to southern Afghanistan in support of Operation Enduring Freedom. A section of Bravo Battery also deployed in 2010 with the 24th Marine Expeditionary Unit and took part in Operation Unified Response in Haiti and Operation Enduring Freedom – Horn of Africa.

== Gallery ==
Old Battalion insignia

== See also ==
- 2nd Marine Aircraft Wing
- Marine Air Control Group 28
- Marine Corps Air Station Cherry Point
- List of United States Marine Corps aviation support units
- History of ground based air defense in the United States Marine Corps
