= VMUT-2 =

Marine Unmanned Aerial Vehicle Training Squadron 2
- VMUT-2 Squadron Insignia
- Active: June 1984 - Present
- Country: United States
- Branch: USMC
- Type: United States Marine Corps Aviation
- Role: Aerial Reconnaissance, Offensive Air Support, Electronic Warfare
- Size: Squadron
- Part of: Marine Aircraft Group 14; 2nd Marine Aircraft Wing
- Garrison/HQ: Marine Corps Air Station Cherry Point
- Nickname: "Night Owls"
- Engagements: Operation Desert Storm; Operation Iraqi Freedom; Operation Enduring Freedom; Operation Allies Refuge

Commanders
- Commanding Officer: LtCol Jonathan L. Boersma
- Executive Officer: Maj Zachery J. Kelly

Marine Unmanned Aerial Vehicle Training Squadron 2 (VMUT-2) is an unmanned aerial vehicle training squadron in the United States Marine Corps that is transitioning from operating the RQ-21A Blackjack to the MQ-9A Reaper. The squadron is based at Marine Corps Air Station Cherry Point in Havelock, North Carolina and will serve as the MQ-9A Reaper Fleet Replacement Squadron, training UAS officers and enlisted sensor operators. Historically, VMUT-2 (as VMU-2) provided aerial surveillance, offensive air support, and electronic warfare for the II Marine Expeditionary Force. VMUT-2 falls under the command of Marine Aircraft Group 14 and the 2nd Marine Aircraft Wing.

== History ==
=== Early years ===
VMUT-2 was originally formed in June 1984 as Detachment T, Target Acquisition Battery, 10th Marine Regiment, 2nd Marine Division, Fleet Marine Forces, Atlantic, thus becoming the first Remotely Piloted Vehicle (RPV) unit within the Marine Corps.

On 22 August 1984, the detachment reorganized, and was re-designated, as the 1st Remotely Piloted Vehicle Platoon, Headquarters Battalion, and 2nd Marine Division. During November 1984, Marines traveled to Israel and began indoctrination training on the Mastiff RPV system. Upon completion of contractor training, 1st RPV Platoon accepted its first two Mastiff air vehicles, control stations, and associated ground support equipment.

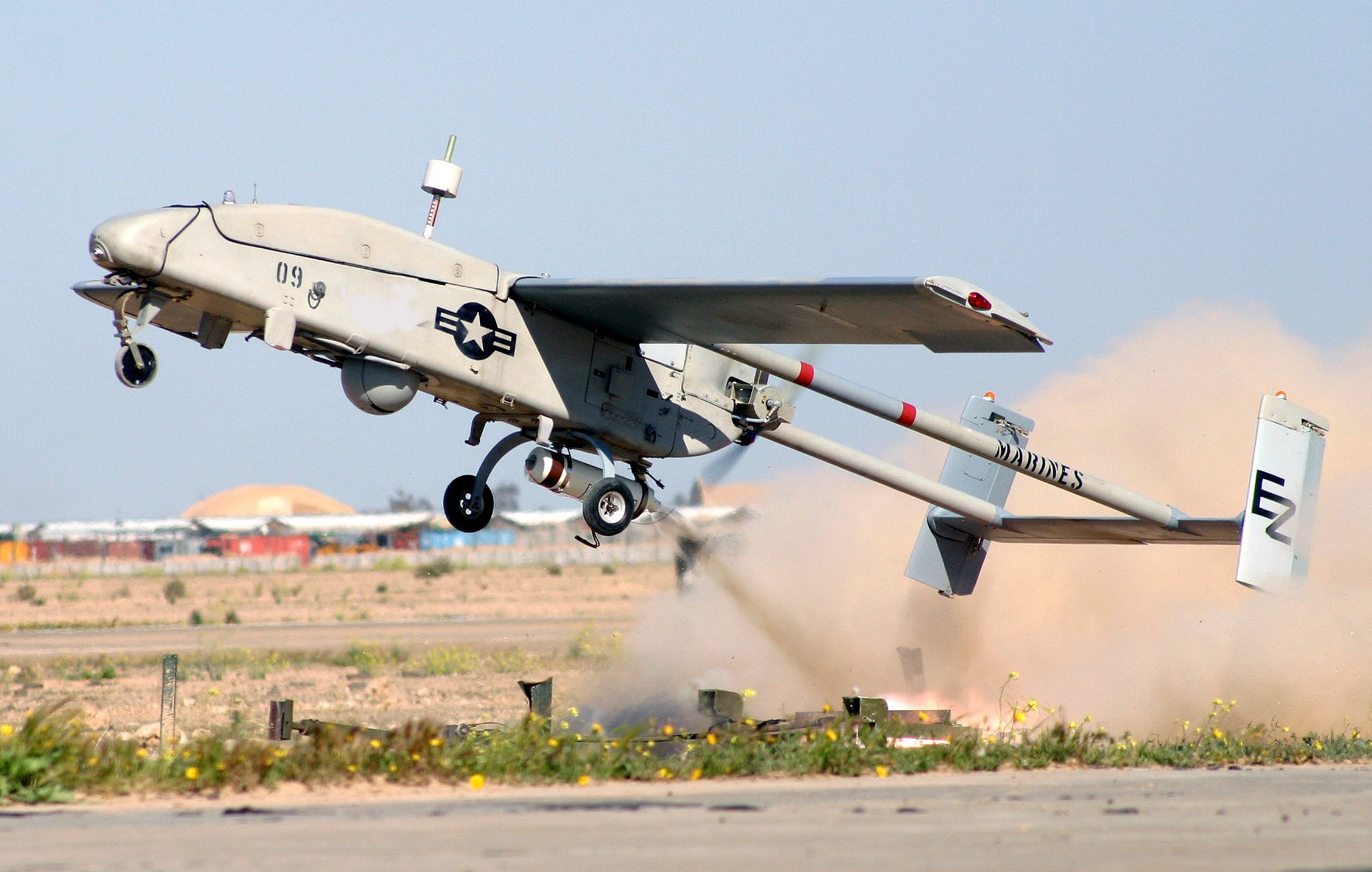
VMU-2 UAV — Pioneer Short Range (SR) UAV

In June 1986, 1st RPV Platoon was assigned to the 13th Marine Amphibious Unit and embarked aboard USS Tarawa for operations in the Western Pacific. In October 1986, the 1st RPV Platoon was reorganized and re-designated as the 2nd Remotely Piloted Vehicle Company, Headquarters Battalion, 2nd Marine Division at Camp Lejeune, NC while deployed with the 13th MAU. The 2d RPV Company transitioned to the Pioneer (Option I) Unmanned Aerial Vehicle system. During May 1987, 2d RPV Company was awarded the Navy Unit Commendation for its numerous contributions to the fielding of Unmanned Aerial Vehicles within the Marine Corps.

During the next three years, the 2d RPV Company trained on the Pioneer system and deployed within the continental United States in support of several Marine Corps exercises. In February 1989, RPVs were incorporated into the Surveillance, Reconnaissance, Intelligence Group (SRIG) concept as an independent company under the group command in March 1990; the unit received the Pioneer Option II air vehicle. As the first UAV unit to field this upgrade, the company embarked aboard the USS Nassau and conducted the first shipboard trial operations of the Pioneer Option II air vehicle.

=== Gulf War and 1990s ===
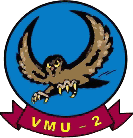
The old VMU-2 insignia

In August 1990, the 2d RPV Company was reassigned to the 4th Marine Expeditionary Brigade (4th MEB) and embarked to Southwest Asia in support of Operation Desert Shield. The company remained embarked with the 4th MEB until November 1990. Thereafter, the company was ordered ashore and reassigned to the 1st Surveillance, Reconnaissance and Intelligence Group, I Marine Expeditionary Force. During January 1991, the company deployed to Saudi Arabia in direct support of the 2nd Marine Division and later conducted missions in support of Operation Desert Storm. From 15 February, to 3 March 1991, direct support of Operation Desert Storm was conducted from Al Qurah. 2d RPV Company began retrograde operations and returned to Camp Lejeune on 20 March 1991. During Operation Desert Shield/Storm, 2d RPV Company flew a total of 69 sorties and 226 flight hours. Of these, 55 sorties and 192 flight hours were combat. No Pioneer air vehicles were lost as a result of enemy action.

During May 1991, a detachment from 2d RPV Company was formed to participate in Operation Provide Comfort and the Kurdish relief effort in northern Iraq. These Marines provided surveillance information during the conduct of the operation. The detachment returned to Camp Lejeune, NC on 31 May 1991. For the remainder of 1991, the company provided support to various elements of II Marine Expeditionary Force.

On 1 January 1993, 2d Remotely Piloted Vehicle Company was re-designated as the 2d Unmanned Aerial Vehicle (UAV) Company and in February 1994, the company was re-equipped with the Pioneer Option II Plus air vehicle. On 16 January 1996, 2nd UAV Company was reorganized under Marine Aviation sponsorship and re-designated as Marine Unmanned Aerial Vehicle Squadron 2 (VMU-2). Placed under Marine Aircraft Group 14, 2nd Marine Aircraft Wing, the squadron was relocated to Marine Corps Air Station Cherry Point, NC in May 1996. Then, in August 2000, VMU-2 was reassigned to Marine Air Control Group 28, 2nd Marine Aircraft Wing.

=== Global war on terrorism ===
==== Operation Iraqi Freedom ====
VMU-2 deployed to Kuwait in February 2003 and subsequently played a key role in Operation Southern Watch and Operation Iraqi Freedom (OIF). Conducting day and night aerial reconnaissance, surveillance, and target acquisition missions in support of coalition forces in the Persian Gulf region, the squadron was deployed for seven months in support of combat operations. Of the 30 squadrons, 200 aircraft and more than 7000 Marines and Sailors from 2nd MAW to conduct combat operations in Iraq, VMU-2 was the final unit to return from Iraq in September 2003.

In February 2004, the squadron deployed to Al Taqqadum Airbase, Iraq again in support of OIF conducting combat missions in support of coalition forces in the Sunni Triangle region. During this deployment the squadron flew over 2,100 hours comprising 700+ combat sorties in support of I MEF in and around Fallujah and Ramadi, Iraq. In August 2004 the Squadron returned to MCAS Cherry Point and began preparation for yet another deployment to Iraq.

The Night Owls deployed again in February 2005 in support of OIF 04–06. During this deployment, the Night Owls integrated the Boeing Insitu ScanEagle UAV into operations along the Euphrates River Valley, more than doubling total aerial reconnaissance coverage for the MEF to over 5,600 hours. The Night Owls returned home in September 2005, then deployed again in support of OIF 05–07 in February 2006, with 3D MAW and I MEF. Many improvements were made during this time which ultimately increased the efficiency and combat effectiveness of the Pioneer. Returning home in late September 2006, the squadron immediately started preparing for the next OIF deployment.

In March 2007, the Night Owls deployed again for the fifth time in support of OIF 06–08. Deploying with the AAI RQ-2 Pioneer and ScanEagle yet again, the Night Owls executed a successful combat deployment and returned to MCAS Cherry Point later in 2007.

In January 2008, VMU-2 transitioned from the RQ-2B Pioneer to the AAI RQ-7B Shadow. Transition training occurred at MCAS Cherry Point during their five-month dwell time. In April 2008, VMU-2 deployed to Iraq for its first operational deployment with the RQ-7B Shadow system and its sixth consecutive deployment in support of the war on terror while simultaneously continuing to provide support with ScanEagle missions across the Al Anbar Province. During this deployment VMU-2 flew over 500 sorties totaling more than 2,400 flight hours.

==== Operation Enduring Freedom ====
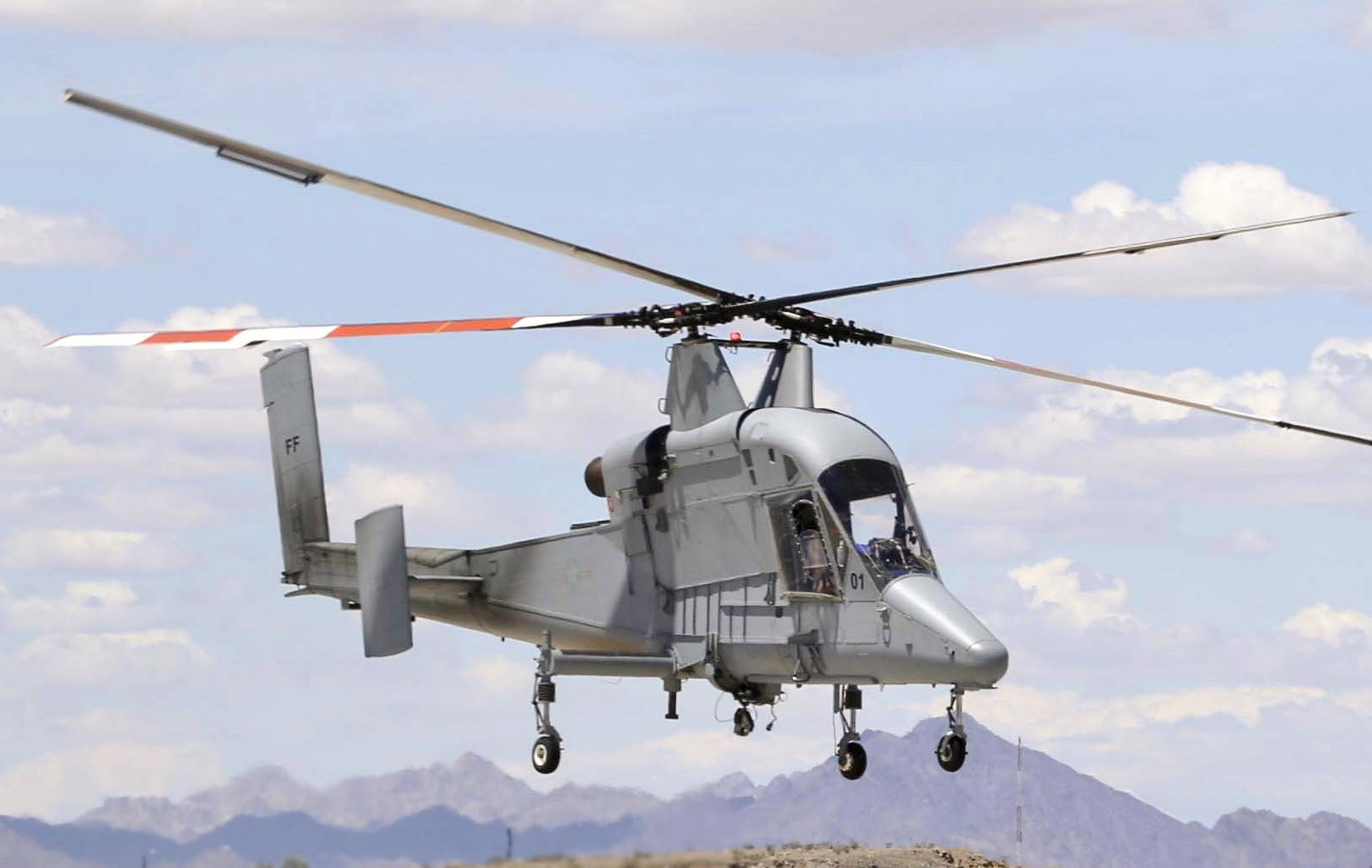
Unmanned K-MAX flown by VMU-2

In 2009, VMU-2 conducted flight operations throughout coastal North Carolina to prepare elements of VMU-2 for upcoming deployments to OIF and OEF. In April 2009, VMU-2 sent Marines to both Iraq and Afghanistan to support the "Overseas Contingency Operation" while conducting flight ops with both the Shadow and ScanEagle systems. In November 2009, VMU-2's two detachments that were deployed to OIF and OEF returned home safely after conducting RQ-7B Shadow and ScanEagle flight operations in both theaters.

During the first half of 2010, VMU-2 conducted flight operations throughout coastal North Carolina and Arizona. While supporting WTI, the Night Owls completed the Alternate Mission Rehearsal Exercise (AMRX) in preparation for the upcoming OEF deployment. This would be the squadron's tenth deployment in support of the war on terror. In October 2010 VMU-2 deployed to Helmand Province, Afghanistan in support of OEF 10.2. During this deployment VMU-2 conducted multiple missions with both the RQ-7B Shadow and ScanEagle. VMU-2 returned from Afghanistan in May 2011 after conducting nearly 20,000 hours of combat flight operations. Throughout the spring and summer of 2011 the squadron continued conducting flight operations in Eastern North Carolina in preparation for domestic training exercises.

In January 2012, VMU-2 was, once again, preparing for another deployment and was conducting unit level training and completing Alternate Mission Rehearsal Exercise while supporting Enhanced Mojave Viper from 29 Palms, CA. In May 2012, VMU-2 deployed to Helmand Province, Afghanistan in support of OEF. During this deployment VMU-2 conducted multiple missions utilizing RQ-7B Shadow, ScanEagle, and the Cargo Resupply Unmanned Aerial System (CRUAS) using the Kaman K-MAX helicopter. Throughout the summer, the Squadron conducted over 3,800 RQ-7B of combat flight hours becoming the first Marine Unmanned Aerial Vehicle Squadron to conduct combat flight operations with the Improved Endurance (Big Wing) RQ-7B Shadow. The squadron employed the K-MAX as a support asset to North Atlantic Treaty Organization (NATO) Forces throughout Southern Afghanistan by delivering and retrograding over 900,000 pounds of supplies and equipment. VMU-2's use of ScanEagle during the deployment contributed to over 20,000 combat flight hours. In August 2012, the Night Owls of VMU-2 re-deployed the RQ-7B Shadow, back to MCAS Cherry Point. This brought to a close more than four years of RQ-7B Shadow support to combat operations.

Again, in November 2013, the Night Owls deployed to Helmand Province, Afghanistan conducting operations through the utilization of the hub and spoke concept from both Camps Leatherneck and Dwyer. During this deployment VMU-2 supported Marines, NATO, and Coalition Forces with the assistance of U.S. civilian contractors in their employment of the AAI Corporation Aerosonde. Furthermore, the Night Owls supported an additional function of Marine aviation, Assault Support, during this period through the employment of the Kaman K-MAX with the Cargo UAS (CRUAS) program. In May 2014, the Night Owls turned over operations to their sister squadron, VMU-1, and returned home to MCAS Cherry Point.

In April 2014, the squadron deployed a detachment with the first RQ-21A Blackjack system to Camp Leatherneck, Afghanistan in support of Operation Enduring Freedom conducting combat missions in support of coalition forces in the Helmand Province. During this deployment the squadron flew upwards of 120 combat sorties involving nearly 1,000 flight hours while under the command of Marine Aircraft Group Afghanistan | MAG A. On its first combat deployment the Blackjack's primary functions were aerial reconnaissance and electronic warfare in support of 1st Battalion, 2nd Marines and 1st Battalion, 7th Marines. These missions were conducted up and down the Helmand River as well as in and around both the cities of Sangin and Marjah. In October 2014, Camp Leatherneck was officially turned over to the Afghan National Army and the VMU-2 detachment returned to MCAS Cherry Point.

=== Marine Expeditionary Units ===
In 2014, VMU-2 began transitioning from the RQ-7B Shadow to the Boeing Insitu RQ-21A Blackjack, a derivative of the ScanEagle, previously utilized by the unit the decade before. VMU-2 completed divestment of its Shadow systems in 2016.

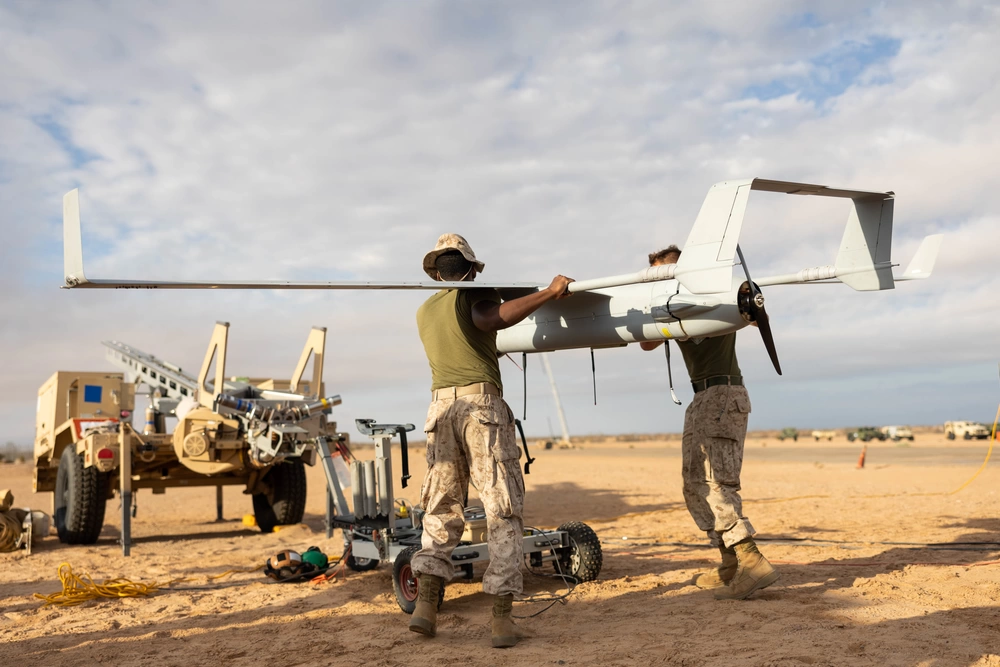
Maintainers from VMU-2 load an RQ-21A onto a launcher.

Between 2015 and 2021, VMU-2 supplied RQ-21A detachments to the 22nd, 24th, and 26th Marine Expeditionary Units (MEUs) where they conducted flight operations from San Antonio-class ships, providing intelligence, surveillance, and reconnaissance (ISR) support. The final MEU deployment for VMU-2 with the RQ-21A took place with the Aviation Combat Element of the 24th MEU in 2021, during which the detachment completed the first ever operational ship to shore deployment with the platform, disembarking from the USS San Antonio, bound for Afghanistan prior to non-combatant evacuation operations. The detachment operated out of Hamid Karzai International Airport in Kabul, flying 183 flight hours in support of Task Force 51/5 and JTF-CR during Operation Allies Refuge.

=== Future ===
In February 2021, the Marine Corps decided to divest all RQ-21A systems in favor of transitioning to the MQ-9A Reaper. Divestment completed FY 2024. VMU-2 completed the last operational flight of the RQ-21A in the Marine Corps on 30 March 2023, and was redesignated as Marine Unmanned Aerial Vehicle Training Squadron 2 (VMUT-2) in July 2023.

== Integrating UAS ==
=== Marine Aviation ===
The beginning of 2013 proved to be the beginning of a new wave for the unmanned community and the employment of the VMUs. Tests and meetings throughout the early part of the year brought to life the movement of VMU-2 into a Marine Aircraft Group 14, setting the standard for the rest of the community. VMU-2 celebrated this transition as the way forward with an increase in training opportunities and potential for greater effects on the battlefield.

On 13 May 2013, VMU-2 was officially reassigned from Marine Air Control Group 28 to Marine Aircraft Group 14.

=== National Airspace ===
Incorporating unmanned aircraft into manned airspace has been on ongoing effort for VMUT-2. In 2013, the Night Owls hosted numerous meetings and conducted several evaluations in order to determine possible solutions for incorporating UAS into the National Airspace. As a result, agencies like the Civil Air Patrol, the US Army, and NASA developed a standard of operations as a proposal to the Federal Aviation Administration (FAA).

Today, there are still many airspace limitations concerning domestic unmanned flight. As the FAA continues to seek out a solution for safely integrating unmanned aircraft into federal airspace, VMU-2 conducts the bulk of its flight and training operations within military operations areas (MOAs).

== See also ==
- History of unmanned aerial vehicles
- List of active United States Marine Corps aircraft squadrons
- List of inactive United States Marine Corps aircraft squadrons
- Fleet Replacement Squadron
- General Atomics MQ-9 Reaper
- Boeing Insitu RQ-21 Blackjack
- AAI RQ-7 Shadow
- AAI Corporation Aerosonde
- Kaman K-MAX
- Boeing Insitu ScanEagle
