= Marine Air Control Group 28 =

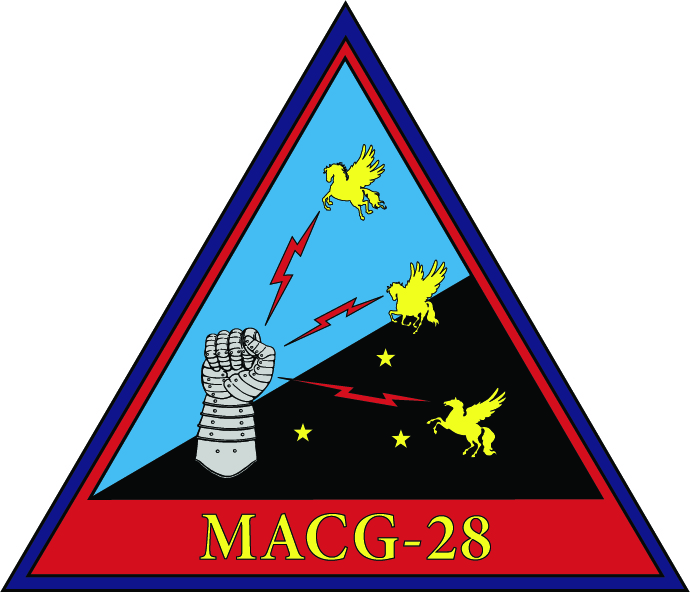
- Active: 1 July 1943 – 31 December 1955; 2 January 1956 - present
- Country: United States
- Allegiance: United States of America
- Branch: United States Marine Corps
- Role: Aviation command & control
- Part of: 2nd Marine Aircraft Wing; II Marine Expeditionary Force
- Garrison/HQ: Marine Corps Air Station Cherry Point
- Engagements: Operation Desert Storm; Operation Enduring Freedom; Operation Iraqi Freedom

Commanders
- Current commander: Colonel Michael Pruden
- Notable commanders: Walter L. J. Bayler; James E. Webb; Robert O. Bisson

Marine Air Control Group 28 (MACG-28) is a United States Marine Corps aviation command and control unit based at Marine Corps Air Station Cherry Point that is currently composed of four command and control squadrons and a low altitude air defense battalion that provide the 2nd Marine Aircraft Wing with airspace coordination, air control, immediate air support, fires integration, air traffic control (ATC), radar surveillance, aviation combat element (ACE) communications support, and an integrated ACE command post in support of the II Marine Expeditionary Force.

== Mission ==
The mission of the MACG is to provide, operate, and maintain the MACCS (Marine Air Command and Control System). The MACG contains subordinate units that provide the major facilities of the MACCS. It normally consists of a Marine tactical air command squadron (MTACS), a Marine air support squadron (MASS), one Marine air control squadron (MACS), a low-altitude air defense (LAAD) battalion, and a Marine wing communication squadron (MWCS).

== Subordinate units ==
- 2nd Low Altitude Air Defense Battalion
- Marine Air Control Squadron 2
- Marine Air Support Squadron 1
- Marine Wing Communications Squadron 28
- Marine Wing Support Squadron 271
- Marine Wing Support Squadron 272
- Marine Wing Support Squadron 273

== History ==
=== Background ===
In February 1943 the Commandant of the Marine Corps convened a "Radar Policy Board" headed by LtCol Walter L. J. Bayler. The board was tasked to make recommendations regarding the establishment of a program for radar early warning, radar fire control and radar fighter direction for Marine Corps units during amphibious operations. Board recommendations included the organization of air warning squadrons and groups, placing organic fighter direction with night fighter squadrons and the creation of an Air Defense Section within the Division of Aviation at Headquarters Marine Corps. The findings of the report were endorsed by the Commandant of the Marine Corps in May 1943

=== World War II ===
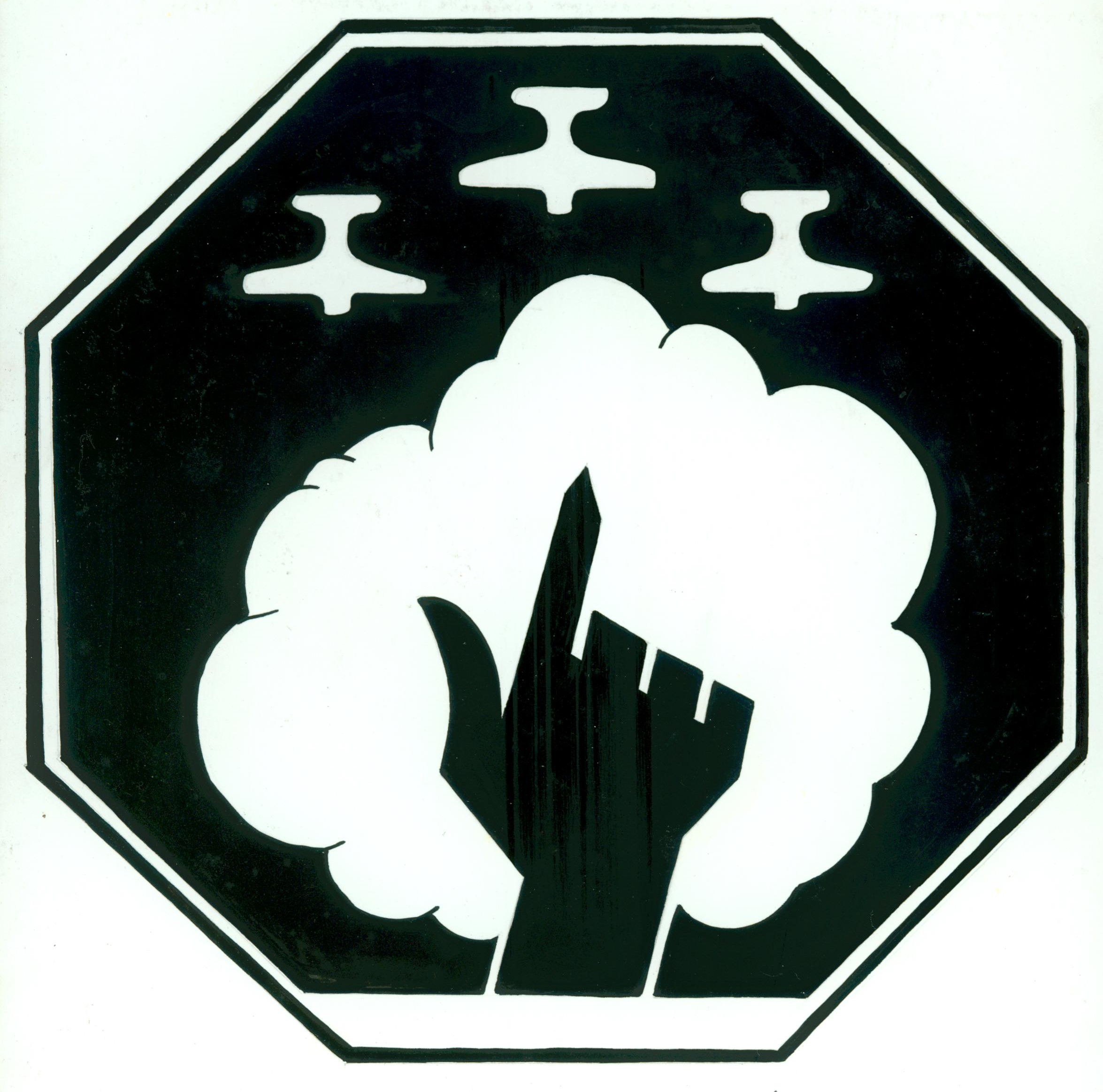
Insignia of the 1st Marine Air Warning Group from World War II.

The 1st Marine Air Warning Group was commissioned at MCAS Cherry Point, North Carolina as part of the 3rd Marine Aircraft Wing on 1 July 1943. The aforementioned and newly promoted Colonel Walter Bayler was the group's first commanding officer. 1st MAWG's mission was to form and train Air Warning Squadrons capable of providing expeditionary air defense during amphibious operations. On 1 April 1944, the group was reassigned to the 9th Marine Aircraft Wing which took over at MCAS Cherry Point after the departure of 3d MAW. Once units were formed and had conducted initial training together as a unit on the east coast they were then shipped to the west coast for follow on training before departing for the Pacific. During World War II, 1st MAWG oversaw the formation and training of 18 air warning squadrons. On 1 August 1946 the group was again re-designated as Marine Air Control Group-1 (MACG-1). MACG-1 was decommissioned on 1 August 1955.

=== Reactivation through the 1980s ===
Marine Wing Headquarters Group 2 (MWHG-2) of the 2nd Marine Aircraft Wing was reactivated on 2 January 1956 at MCAS Cherry Point, North Carolina. Its composition at that time included Headquarters and Headquarters Squadron 2 and Marine Air Control Squadron 7 (MACS-7). The fledgling organization began to grow when, in 1963, it was administratively assigned the 3d Light Antiaircraft Missile Battalion (3rd LAAM). Its growth was short lived however, for in 1965 MACS-7 was directed to deploy to Okinawa, Japan and subsequently saw duty in the Republic of Vietnam. Upon completing its service in Vietnam, MACS-7 was reassigned for duty with the 3rd Marine Aircraft Wing at Marine Corps Air Station El Toro, California.

In May 1966, the Group was again re-designated; it would now be known as Marine Air Control Group 2. It was this year that 3d LAAM Battalion became administratively and operationally under the control of the Group. Re-designation occurred once more in 1967 when the Group was assigned its present-day moniker Marine Air Control Group 28.

With its new designation came additional support and control organizations in the form of Marine Air Support Squadron 1 and Marine Air Control Squadron 5. MACS-5 was activated and assigned to support Fleet Marine Force Aviation operations at Marine Corps Air Station Beaufort, South Carolina.

The Group's expanding support and control responsibilities were reexamined and in 1971 it was determined that the critical function of Wing communications needed to be added to the Group's communications capabilities. This consolidation joined the organizational colors of Marine Wing Communications Squadron 28 with those of H&HS-28, 3d LAAM Battalion, MASS-1, MACS-5, and MACS-6 under the senior banner of MACG-28.

In 1973, the capability of a shoulder-launched missile was introduced into the Group. A Forward Area Air Defense (FAAD) platoon was activated and placed under the administrative and operational control of 3d LAAM Battalion. The activation of the FAAD platoon enhanced air defense of aviation vital areas and introduce a close-in air defense capability for maneuver units or security missions. April 1976 introduced the consolidation of air traffic control assets within the Marine Air Wing and a new squadron. Marine Air Traffic Control Squadron 28 (MATCS-28), joined ranks as the newest member of the Marine Air Command and Control System.

The tactical advantages, increased capabilities and innovative employment offered by shoulder-launched missiles led to the creation of a FAAD Battery. This enhanced capability was formally introduced in October 1983 as the 2d Forward Area Air Defense Battery stood-up and took its place in the organizational structure of MACG-28.

=== Global war on terror ===
Following the September 11, 2001 attacks, MACG-28 Marines were sent almost immediately to augment the Combined Air Operations Center (CAOC) at Prince Sultan Air Base, Saudi Arabia and were manning tactical positions on the CAOC floor when the first bombs fell in Afghanistan. Notably, MACS-2 deployed an Early Warning and Control site to Jordan to assist with data collection on Iraq in the months building to Operation Iraqi Freedom (OIF).

During OIF all subordinate units of MACG-28 deployed Marines with the I Marine Expeditionary Force. MASS-1, MWCS-28, VMU-2 sent their entire squadrons, while 2nd LAAD deployed a battery, MACS-2 an EW/C detachment, and MTACS-28 critical augments for the 3rd Marine Aircraft Wing (3rd MAW) Tactical Air Command Center (TACC)

At the conclusion of major offensive operations, most elements of MACG-28 redeployed home. In early 2004, MACG-28 deployed VMU-2 and an Air Traffic Control Detachment from MACS-2, and B CO, MWCS-28 to Al Taqqadum Airfield in Al Anbar Province, Iraq. At the start of 2005, MACG-28 deployed its Headquarters, MTACS-28, MACS-2, 2nd LAAD, MASS-1, MWCS-28 back to Iraq. The units of MACG-28 maintained air command and control, wing communications, and ISR of the MEF battlespace for the duration of 2005, then the majority redeployed back to the states.

In January 2007, MACG-28 again deployed all its units and tactical agencies once again to Iraq. In January 2009, MACG-28 deployed all units (with the exception of 2nd LAAD) to Operation Iraqi Freedom. They were the last Marine units to control the airspace in western Iraq. During this time several detachments of the group deployed to Afghanistan as part of Marine Aircraft Group 40 as Marine Corps forces began to build-up in Helmand Province.

In January 2013, MACG-28 (Forward) again deployed to Operation Enduring Freedom in Helmand Province, Afghanistan. The group was the last Marine air command and control unit to control the airspace over southern Afghanistan.

== Unit awards ==
A unit citation or commendation is an award bestowed upon an organization for the action cited. Members of the unit who participated in said actions are allowed to wear on their uniforms the awarded unit citation. Marine Air Control Group 28 has been presented with the following awards:

Streamer	Award	Year(s)	Additional Info
	Navy Unit Commendation Streamer with one Bronze Star	2005-2006, 2007-2008	Iraq
	American Campaign Streamer	World War II	
	World War II Victory Streamer	1941–1945	Pacific War
	National Defense Service Streamer with three Bronze Stars	1950–1954, 1961–1974, 1990–1995, 2001–present	Korean War, Vietnam War, Gulf War, war on terrorism
A multicolored streamer with (from outer to inner) green, red, black (the three colors of the Afghan flag), white, red, and white again horizontal stripes with a blue horizontal stripe in the center	Afghanistan Campaign Streamer with two Bronze Stars		
	Iraq Campaign Streamer with four Bronze Stars	2003, 2005, 2007, 2009	
	Global War on Terrorism Expeditionary Streamer		
	Global War on Terrorism Service Streamer	2001–present	

== See also ==
- Organization of the United States Marine Corps
- List of United States Marine Corps aviation support units
