= Marine Corps Air Station Cherry Point =

US Marine Corps base in Havelock, North Carolina, United States

- Cunningham Field
- Havelock, North Carolina in the United States
- KC-130J Hercules of VMG-252 on the flight-line MCAS Cherry Point

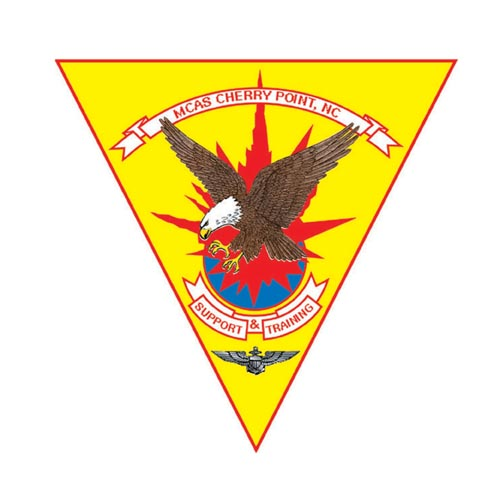

Site information
- Type: Marine Corps Air Station
- Owner: Department of Defense
- Operator: US Marine Corps
- Controlled by: Marine Corps Installations – East
- Condition: Operational

Location
- Location in the United States
- Coordinates: 34°54′03″N 076°52′51″W

Site history
- Built: 1942; 84 years ago
- In use: 1942–present

Garrison information
- Current commander: Colonel Brendan Burks
- Garrison: 2nd Marine Aircraft Wing

Airfield information
- Identifiers: ICAO: KNKT, FAA LID: NKT, WMO: 723090
- Elevation: 8.8 metres (29 ft) AMSL
Runways
Direction	Length and surface
14L/32R	2,736.7 metres (8,979 ft) Asphalt
5L/23R	2,588 metres (8,491 ft) Asphalt
14R/32L	2,559.7 metres (8,398 ft) Asphalt
5R/23L	2,495.7 metres (8,188 ft) Asphalt
- Other airfield facilities: 5x V/STOL pads

Marine Corps Air Station Cherry Point or MCAS Cherry Point (*34.9009°N 76.8807°W) (ICAO: KNKT, FAA LID: NKT) is a United States Marine Corps airfield located in Havelock, North Carolina, United States, in the eastern part of the state. It was built in 1941, and was commissioned in 1942. It is currently home to the 2nd Marine Aircraft Wing.

== History ==
Congress authorized Marine Corps Air Station Cherry Point on 9 July 1941, with an initial appropriation of $14,990,000 for construction and clearing of an 8,000 acre (32 km^{2}) tract of swamps, farms and timberland.

Actual clearing of the site began on 6 August 1941, with extensive drainage and malaria control work. Construction began in November, just 17 days before the attack on Pearl Harbor. Lieutenant Colonel Thomas J. Cushman served as the Marine Corps representative supervising construction by the Navy Civil Engineer Corps, and later served as the first commanding officer of the air station.

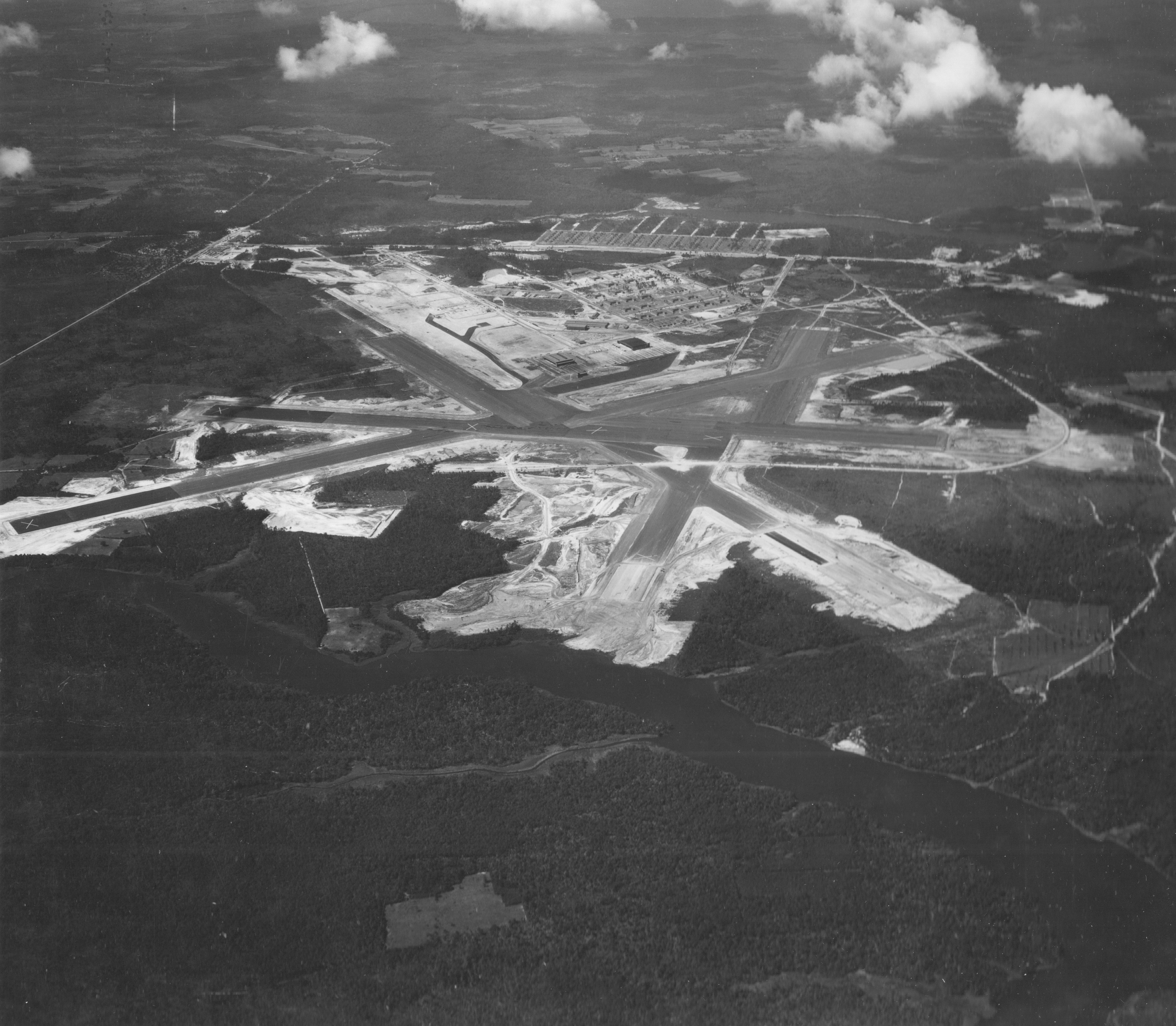
MCAS Cherry Point looking Southwest from 7,000 foot altitude, September 19, 1942

On 20 May 1942, the facility was commissioned Cunningham Field, named in honor of the Marine Corps' first aviator, Lieutenant Colonel Alfred A. Cunningham. The completed facility was later renamed Marine Corps Air Station Cherry Point, after a local post office situated among cherry trees.

Cherry Point's primary World War II mission was to train units and individual Marines for service to the Pacific theater. The air station also served as a base for anti-submarine operations, with an Army Air Forces (22nd Antisubmarine Squadron) and later a Navy squadron each being responsible for the sinking of a German U-boat just off the North Carolina coast during 1943.

Cherry Point's contribution to the Korean War effort was to provide a steady stream of trained aviators and air crewmen, as well as maintenance and support personnel as replacements to forward deployed aviation units.

During the Vietnam War, Cherry Point deployed three A-6 Intruder squadrons to the Far East and again provided a constant source of replacements for aircrews and enlisted aviation personnel.

In Operation Desert Storm, Cherry Point was a major contributor to the victory in Southwest Asia by supporting the deployment of three AV-8B Harrier squadrons, two A-6E Intruder squadrons, one KC-130 Hercules squadron, one EA-6B Prowler squadron, and headquarters detachments from Marine Aircraft Group 14, Marine Aircraft Group 32, and the 2nd Marine Aircraft Wing.

Cherry Point Marines and Navy Corpsmen participated in strike missions and follow-on operations in Afghanistan and its surrounding region during Operation Enduring Freedom, which was initiated on 7 October 2001.

On 8 September 2007, the headquarters building (198) was gutted by a fire. The groundbreaking ceremony for the new Headquarters Building was on 29 July 2009, with completion planned for sometime in 2011.

The air station and its associated support locations occupy more than 29,000 acres (120 km^{2}). Its runway system is large enough that the air station served as an alternate emergency landing site for the Space Shuttle launches out of Cape Canaveral, Florida.

In 2013, Cherry Point hosted warfighters, technology teams and testers under the flags of 10 nations, and each of the U.S. military services for the 11th Bold Quest coalition demonstration. The Joint Staff, J6 Joint Deployable Analysis Team (JDAT) led the test plan design, execution control, and emplaced the necessary infrastructure to connect the numerous geographic sites across seven states. Cherry Point was chosen for its ideal location for hosting East Coast military assets, supporting two U.S. Navy warships operating offshore, the Arleigh Burke-class guided missile destroyer USS Jason Dunham and Ticonderoga-class guided missile cruiser USS San Jacinto.

In 2024, VMFA-251 received their first Joint Strike Fighter aircraft, making it the first active duty F-35C Lightning II squadron on the East Coast.

=== USAF use ===
On 1 July 1957, the United States Air Force (USAF) 614th Airborne Control and Warning Squadron established an Air Defense Command Phase I Mobile Radar station (M-116) at Cherry Point. This station was part of the planned deployment of forty-four Mobile radar stations. The USAF activated an AN/FPS-6 and two AN/FPS-8 radars located adjacent to Base Flight Operations. These radars were placed on top of 90-foot (27 m) towers without radomes, and initially the station functioned as a Ground-Control Intercept (GCI) and warning station. As a GCI station, the squadron's role was to guide interceptor aircraft toward unidentified intruders picked up on the unit's radar scopes.

In addition to the radars on the air station, two unmanned AN/FPS-14 "Gap Filler" sites, one at Engelhard, NC (M-116B) 35°29′49″N 076°00′34″W and one at Holly Ridge, NC (M-116C) 34°30′50″N 077°32′08″W were set up for additional coverage.

One of the AN/FPS-8s was damaged by Hurricane Donna in 1960. The radars were turned over to the Navy on 30 April 1960, and the Marine Corps retained the other undamaged AN/FPS-8 radar for a number of years for base air traffic control.

In 1961, M-116 joined the Semi Automatic Ground Environment (SAGE) system, initially feeding data to DC-04 at Fort Lee AFS, Virginia. After joining, the squadron was re-designated as the 614th Radar Squadron (SAGE) on 1 March 1963. The radar squadron provided information 24/7 the SAGE Direction Center where it was analyzed to determine range, direction altitude speed and whether or not aircraft were friendly or hostile.

USAF radar operations continued at MCAS Cherry Point until 1 August 1963 when budget reductions and a general draw-down of antiaircraft radar sites closed the facility.

== Tenant Squadrons ==
Flying units based at MCAS Cherry Point

Insignia	Squadron	Code	Callsign/Nickname	Assigned Aircraft	Operational Assignment
	Marine Fighter Attack Squadron 251	VMFA-251	Thunderbolts	F-35C Lightning II	2nd Marine Aircraft Wing
	Marine Fighter Attack Squadron 115	VMFA-115	Silver Eagles	F-35C Lightning II	2nd Marine Aircraft Wing
	Marine Fighter Attack Squadron 231	VMFA-231	Ace of Spades	F-35B Lightning II	2nd Marine Aircraft Wing
VMFA-542 Squadron Insignia	Marine Fighter Attack Squadron 542	VMFA-542	Tigers	F-35B Lightning II	2nd Marine Aircraft Wing
	Marine Unmanned Aerial Vehicle Training Squadron 2	VMUT-2	Night Owls	RQ-21A Blackjack / MQ-9A Reaper	2nd Marine Aircraft Wing
	Marine Aerial Refueler Transport Squadron 252	VMGR-252	Otis	KC-130J Hercules	2nd Marine Aircraft Wing

== Based units ==
Flying and notable non-flying units based at MCAS Cherry Point.

=== United States Marine Corps ===
Marine Corps Installations – East

- Headquarters and Headquarters Squadron – UC-35D Citation

2nd Marine Logistics Group

- Combat Logistics Regiment 25 (CLR-25)
  - Combat Logistics Company 21 (CLC-21)

2nd Marine Aircraft Wing

- Marine Wing Headquarters Squadron 2
- Marine Air Control Group 28
  - 2d Low Altitude Defense Battalion (2D LAAD Bn)
  - Marine Air Control Squadron 2 (MACS-2)
  - Marine Air Support Squadron 1 (MASS-1)
  - Marine Tactical Air Command Squadron 28 (MATCS-28)
  - Marine Wing Communications Squadron 28 (MWCS-28)
- Marine Aircraft Group 14
  - Marine Aerial Refueller Squadron 252 (VMGR-252) – KC-130J Hercules
  - Marine Attack Squadron 223 (VMA-223) – AV-8B Harrier II
  - Marine Attack Squadron 231 (VMA-231) – AV-8B Harrier II
  - Marine Fighter Attack Squadron 542 (VMFA-542) – F-35B Lightning II
  - Marine Aviation Logistics Squadron 14 (MALS-14)
  - Marine Unmanned Aerial Vehicle Squadron 2 (VMU-2) – RQ-21A Blackjack
  - Marine Wing Support Squadron 271 (MWSS-271)
- Marine Aviation Training Support Group 42
  - Marine Attack Training Squadron 203 (VMAT-203) Squadron Augment Unit – AV-8B Harrier II and TAV-8B Harrier II

=== United States Navy ===
Naval Air Systems Command

- Fleet Readiness Center East

== Supported facilities ==
MCAS Cherry Point also maintains a number of satellite airfields:

- MCALF Bogue, a staffed installation in Bogue Sound, North Carolina which is used for Field Carrier Landing Practice.
- MCOLF Oak Grove, a minimally staffed outlying airfield near Pollocksville, North Carolina specializing in operations on unimproved surfaces in a reduced visibility environments.
- MCOLF Atlantic, an outlying airfield near Atlantic, North Carolina used as an arming and refueling point and base for rotary-wing base supporting training activities in the region.

Several former outlying landing fields have been converted to regional airports, such as MCOF Greenville, MCAA Kinston, MCASE near Edenton NC and MCOF New Bern.

== See also ==
- Marine Corps Auxiliary Landing Field Bogue
- Proposed Naval Outlying Landing Field North Carolina
- United States Marine Corps Aviation
- List of United States Marine Corps installations
- List of airports in North Carolina
- List of USAF Aerospace Defense Command General Surveillance Radar Stations
