= 2nd Marine Aircraft Wing =

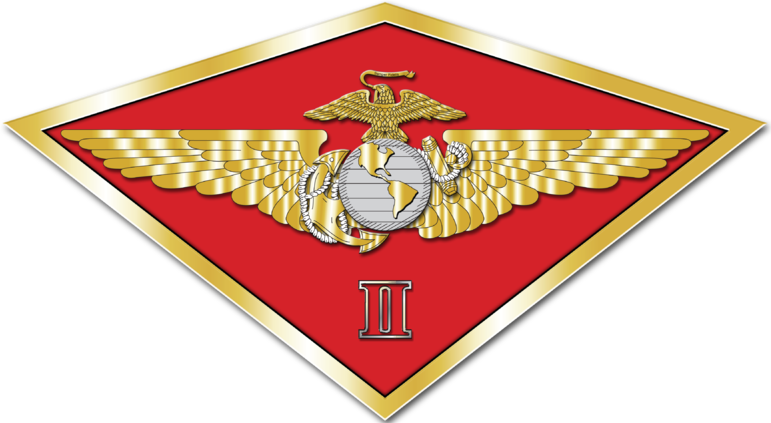
- 2nd MAW Insignia
- Active: 10 July 1941–present
- Country: United States
- Branch: United States Marine Corps
- Type: Marine Aircraft Wing
- Role: Conduct air operations in support of the Fleet Marine Forces
- Part of: II Marine Expeditionary Force
- Garrison/HQ: Marine Corps Air Station Cherry Point
- Nickname: 2nd MAW
- Engagements: World War II: Wake Island; Battle of Guadalcanal; Battle of Midway; Battle of Saipan; Battle of Tinian; Battle of Guam; Battle of Okinawa; Operation Desert Storm; War on terror: Operation Enduring Freedom; Operation Iraqi Freedom; War on cartels: Ecuadorian conflict (2024–present)

Commanders
- Commanding General: MajGen Ryan S. Rideout
- Assistant Wing Commander: BGen Shannon M. Brown
- Notable commanders: Gen. Glenn M. Walters; Lt.Gen. Francis P. Mulcahy; Lt.Gen. Ralph K. Rottet; Lt.Gen. Hugh M. Elwood; Lt.Gen. George C. Axtell; Maj.Gen. William L. McKittrick; BGen. Alexander W. Kreiser Jr

Insignia
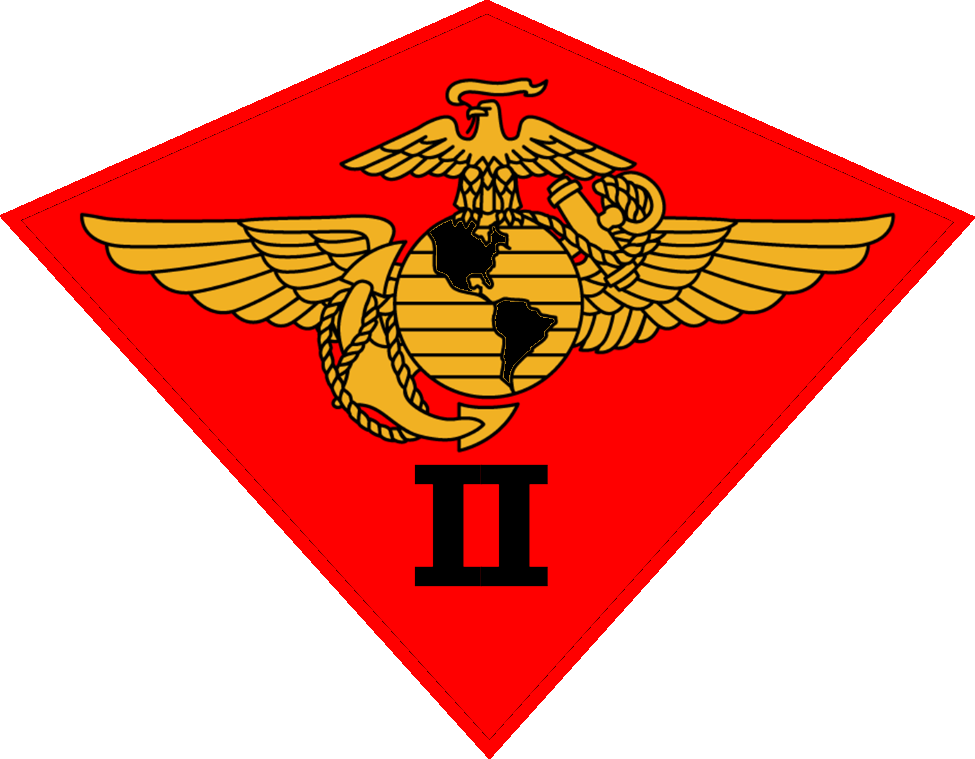
- Late WWII 2nd MAW Insignia

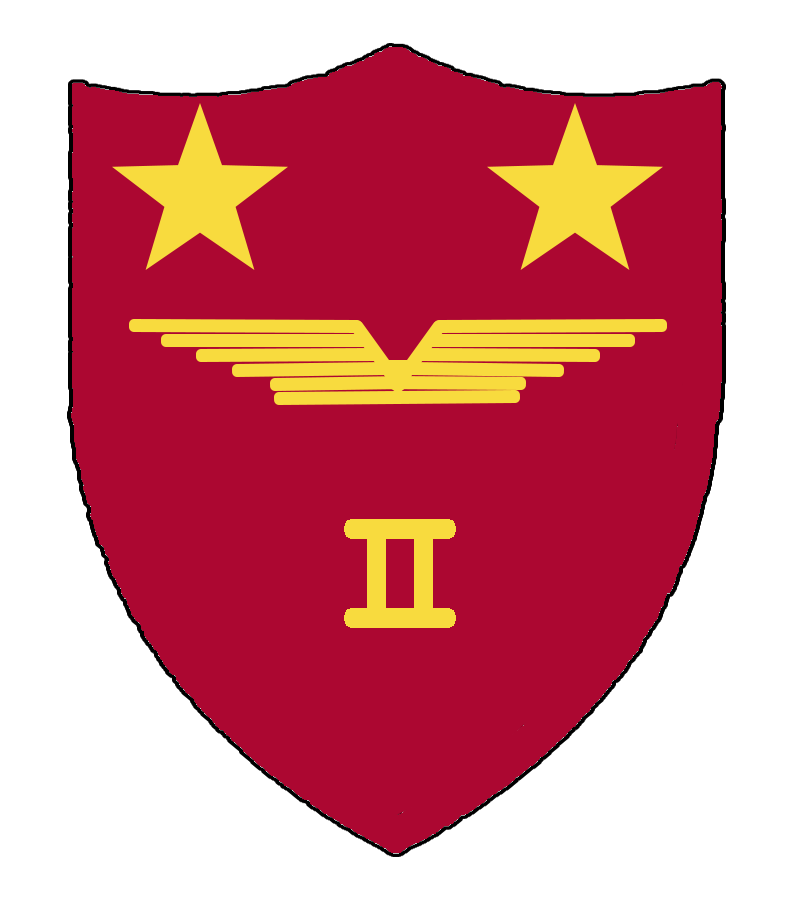
- Early WWII 2nd MAW Insignia

The 2nd Marine Aircraft Wing (2nd MAW) is the major east coast aviation unit of the United States Marine Corps and is headquartered in Marine Corps Air Station Cherry Point, North Carolina. The Wing provides the aviation combat element for the II Marine Expeditionary Force.

== Mission ==
Conduct air operations in support of the Marine forces to include Offensive air support, anti air warfare, assault support, aerial reconnaissance, electronic warfare, and control of aircraft and missiles. As a collateral function, the MAW may participate as an integral component of naval aviation in the execution of such other Navy functions as the Fleet Commander may direct.

== Organization ==
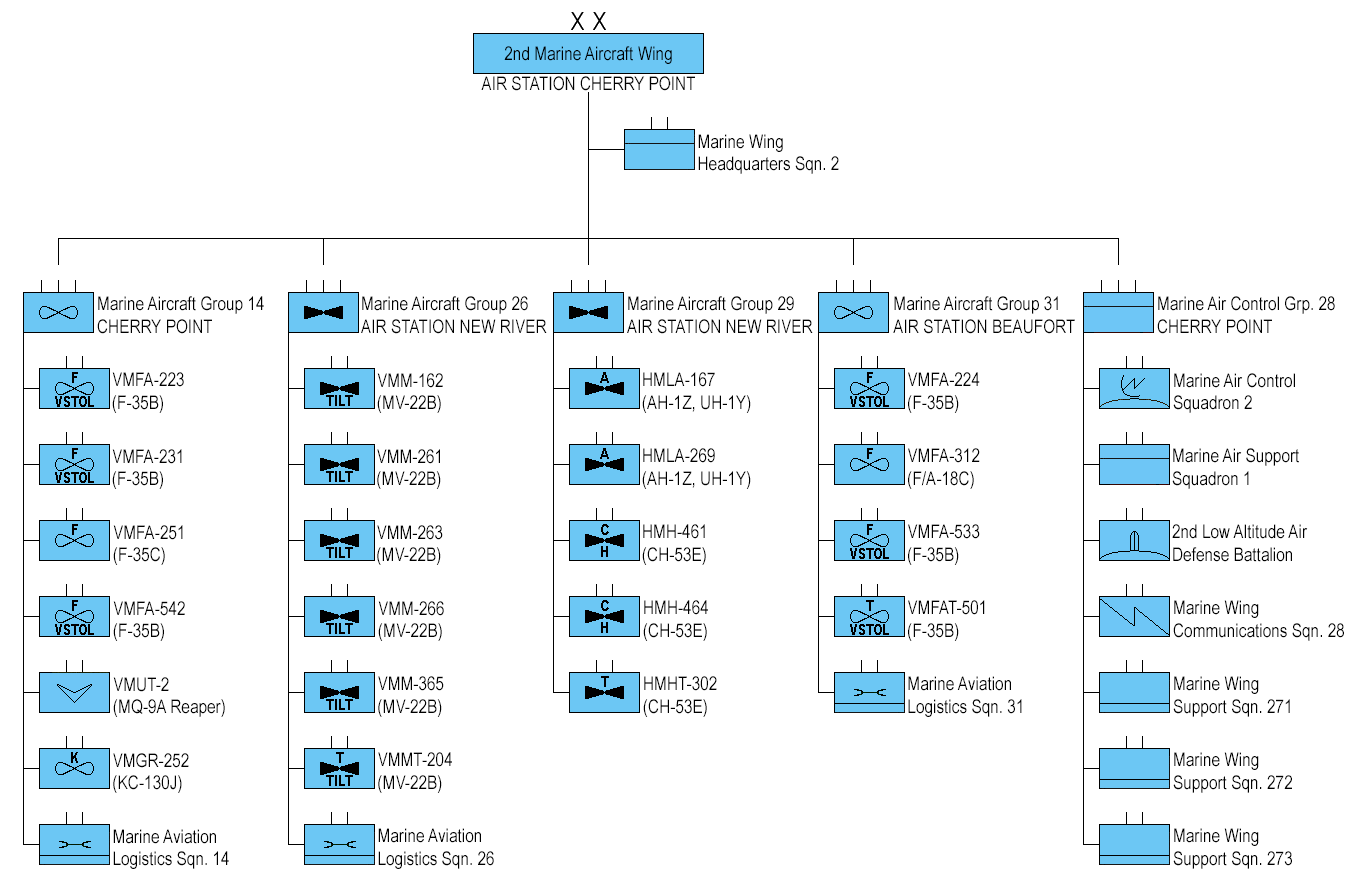
2nd Marine Aircraft Wing organization as of May 2026 (click to enlarge)

As of May 2026 the 2nd Marine Aircraft Wing consists of the following units

- Marine Wing Headquarters Squadron 2
- Marine Aircraft Group 14
- Marine Aircraft Group 26
- Marine Aircraft Group 29
- Marine Aircraft Group 31
- Marine Air Control Group 28
- 2nd Marine Aircraft Wing Band

Due to a re-organization within Marine aviation, 2nd MAW expanded between 2007–2010. In 2008, HMH-366 and HMLA-467 were commissioned in September and October, respectively. In 2010, VMFA-451 was recommissioned and re-designated as VMFAT-501 as the Fleet Replacement Squadron for the F-35 Lightning II.

== Locations ==
- Marine Corps Air Station Cherry Point
- Marine Corps Air Station New River
- Marine Corps Air Station Beaufort.

== History ==
=== World War II ===
In late 1940, Congress authorized a naval air fleet of fifteen thousand aircraft. The Marine Corps was allotted a percentage of these planes to be formed into two air wings with thirty-two operational squadrons. On the advice of Navy and Marine Corps advisors returning from observing the war in Europe these numbers were doubled very soon after. It was under this expansion program that the 2nd Marine Aircraft Wing was commissioned in San Diego, California on 10 July 1941. Its first subordinate command was Marine Air Group Two which was based at Marine Corps Air Station Ewa, Hawaii. This gave 2dMAW some of the oldest squadrons in Marine aviation

Although the Hawaii-based squadrons sustained extensive damage during the Japanese attack on Pearl Harbor on 7 December 1941, 2dMAW contributed to 83 South Pacific combat operations. Marines and aircraft from 2dMAW participated in major battles or campaigns at Wake Island, Guadalcanal, Midway, Saipan, Tinian, Guam and Okinawa. 2dMAW served as the headquarters for the Tactical Air Force, Tenth Army during the Battle of Okinawa. During three months of combat over the skies of Okinawa, squadrons from 2dMAW accounted for 484½ planes shot down helping to create 21 new Marine Corps aces. Following the surrender of Japan, 2dMAW retained its headquarters on Okinawa and sent Marine Aircraft Group 31 (MAG-31) to Yokosuka and other units to Omura and Nagasaki.

In April 1946, 2dMAW relocated to its present home at Marine Corps Air Station Cherry Point, North Carolina.

=== Vietnam War ===
During the Vietnam War, 2nd MAW supplied combat-ready units and personnel to operations in the Asian Theater.

=== 1980s and 1990s ===
In the 1980s, 2nd MAW units were active participants in exercises and operations around the globe, to include those in Lebanon, Cuba, Grenada, Panama, and the Dominican Republic.

The decade of the 1990s began with Operation Desert Shield and Operation Desert Storm. The millennium closed with 2nd MAW squadrons prosecuting and supporting NATO air strikes in Kosovo and Serbia during Operation Allied Force, and flying support during Operation Northern Watch from Incirlik, Turkey.

=== Global war on terror ===
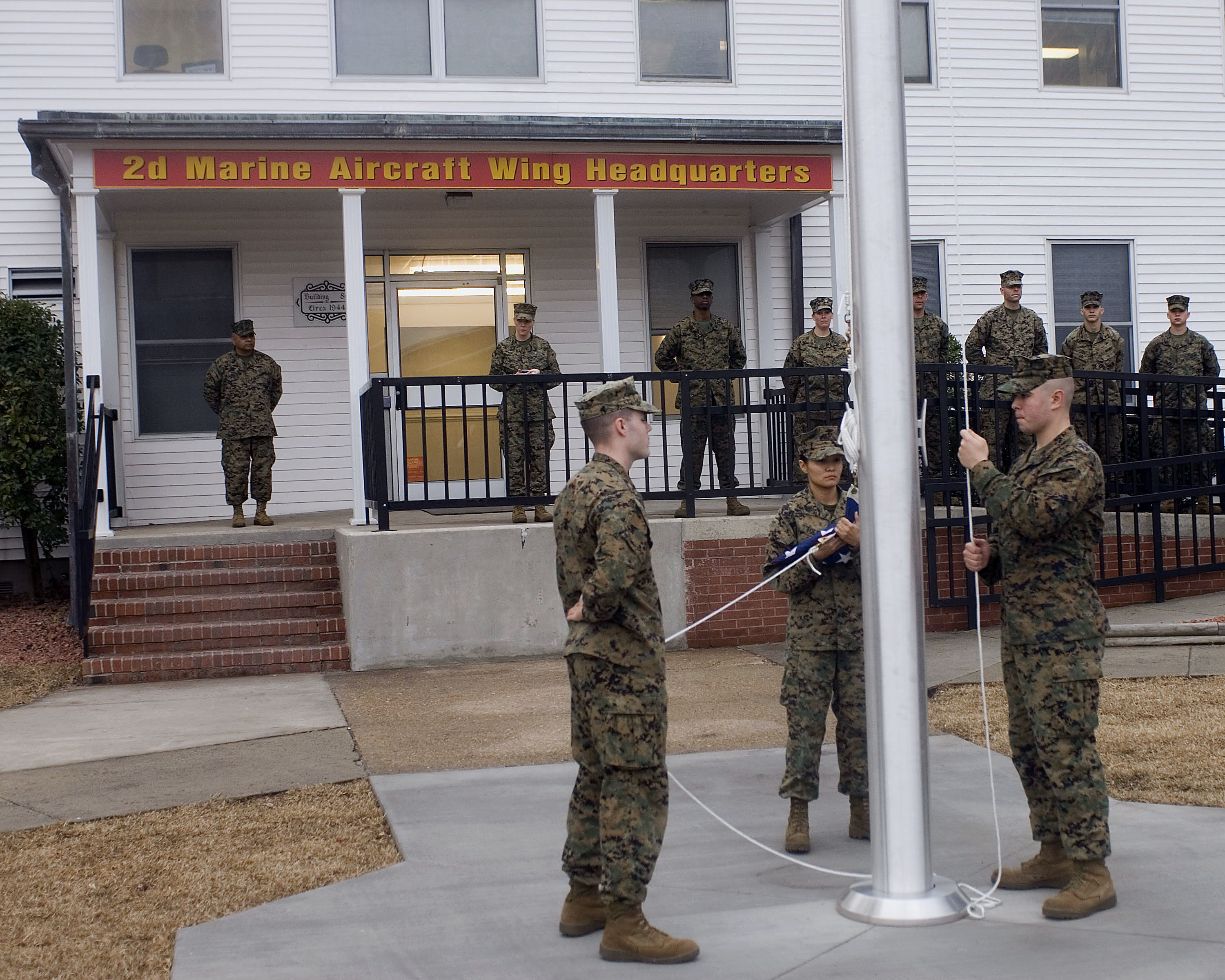
Marines from 2nd MAW headquarters prepare morning colors for the first time at the new headquarters building in 2008.

From 2000 through 2002, EA-6B Prowler squadrons deployed in support of Operation Southern Watch, Operation Northern Watch and Unit Deployment Program rotations to Japan. AV-8B Harrier and helicopter squadrons deployed in support of the 22nd, 24th and 26th Marine Expeditionary Units. F/A-18 Hornet squadrons deployed aboard the USS Harry S. Truman with Carrier Air Wing 3; and Marine Wing Support Group 27 and Marine Air Control Group 28 deployed personnel in support of all exercises and operations in which 2nd MAW flying squadrons were participating.

In early 2001, VMFA-312 and VMAQ-3 participated in a joint combined strike against Iraq. This marked the first Marine Corps combat use of the Joint Standoff Weapon (JSOW). VMA-542 and HMM-261 flew combat missions over Afghanistan in support of Operation Enduring Freedom and conducted humanitarian missions in Djibouti. The Marines of VMA-542 were among the first to employ the LITENING 2 targeting pod in combat.

In 2003, 2nd MAW deployed more than 7,700 Marines and Sailors in support of the Operation Iraqi Freedom, Operation Enduring Freedom, and Joint Task Force Horn of Africa. More than 200 tactical combat aircraft flew in support of these missions. They supported combat and contingency operations around the globe, with greater than 70 percent of the command and control, support group, and aircraft deployed simultaneously.

During the 2003 invasion of Iraq, 2nd Marine Aircraft Wing units flew over 7,800 combat sorties, expended over 3.9 million pounds of ordnance, carried over 10,000 troops and 6.2 million pounds of cargo, built five base camps, two expeditionary airfields (EAFs), ten forward area arming and refueling points (FARPS) and three forward operating bases (FOBs). 2nd MAW eventually headquartered at Al Asad Airbase to serve as the aviation combat element of Multi-National Forces West for the remainder of the Iraq War. In the fall of 2009, the wing headquarters turned this mission over to Marine Aircraft Group 26 and returned home.

As American forces ended their missions in Iraq, 2dMAW continued to support the war on terrorism in Afghanistan. Units from 2dMAW rotated through Afghanistan on a regular basis until the Marine Corps finally withdrew in 2014.

== Current aircraft ==
Fixed-wing aircraft

- F-35B Lightning II
- F/A-18 Hornet
- KC-130J Hercules

Rotary wing aircraft

- AH-1W SuperCobra
- AH-1Z Viper
- UH-1Y Venom
- CH-53E Super Stallion

Tilt rotor aircraft

- MV-22B Osprey

UAVs

- RQ-21A Blackjack
- MQ-9A Reaper

== See also ==
- United States Marine Corps Aviation
- List of United States Marine Corps aircraft wings
- List of United States Marine Corps aircraft squadrons
- 6th Special Security Communications Team
