= VMAQ-3 =

Marine Tactical Electronic Warfare Squadron 3
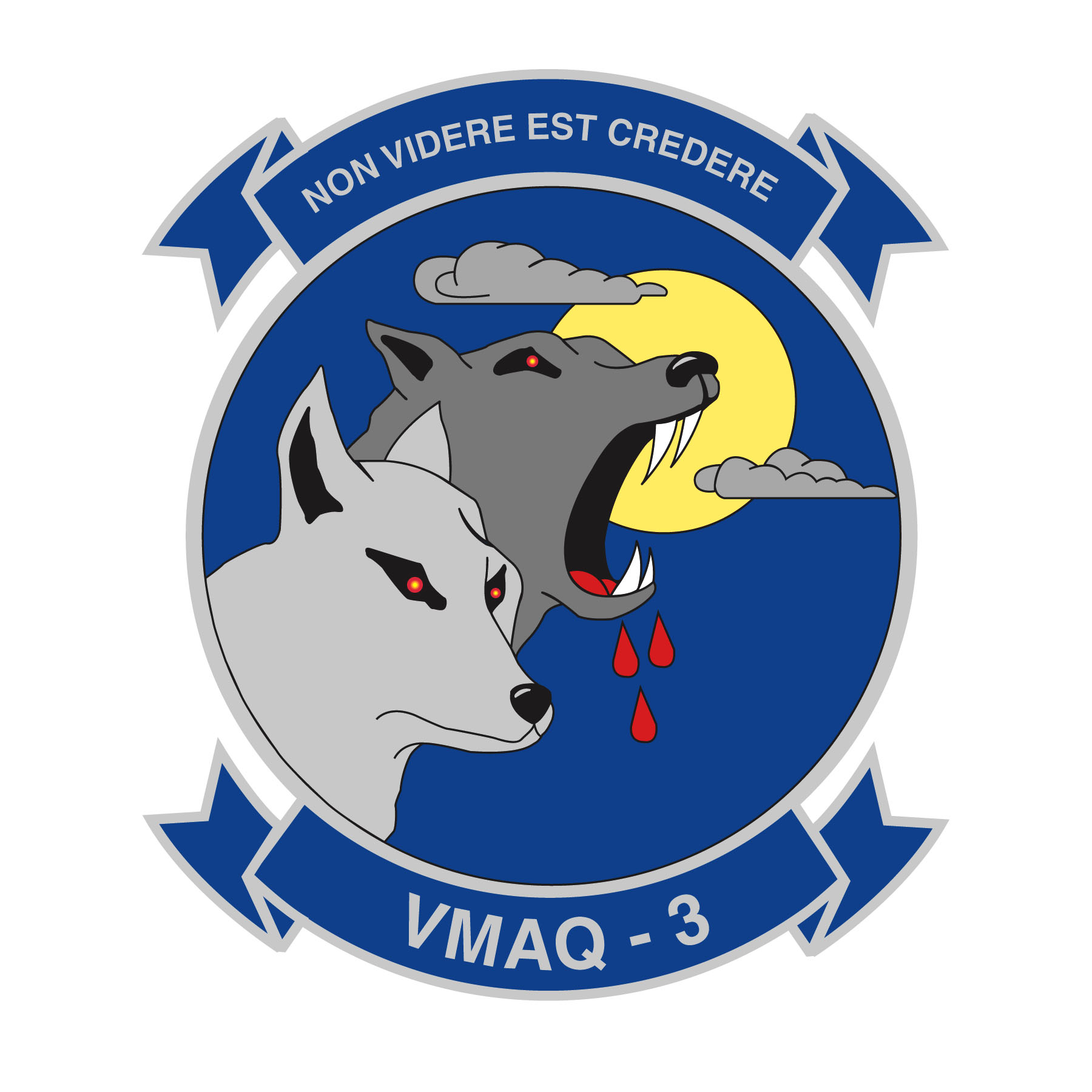
- VMAQ-3 insignia
- Active: 1 July 1992 – 11 May 2018
- Country: United States
- Allegiance: United States of America
- Branch: United States Marine Corps
- Type: Attack
- Role: Electronic Warfare
- Part of: Marine Aircraft Group 14; 2nd Marine Aircraft Wing
- Garrison/HQ: Marine Corps Air Station Cherry Point
- Nickname: Moon Dogs
- Mottos: "Non Videre Est Credere" "Not Seeing is Believing"
- Tail Code: MD
- Engagements: Operation Deny Flight; Operation Deliberate Guard; Operation Northern Watch; Operation Enduring Freedom; Operation Iraqi Freedom; Operation Inherent Resolve

Marine Tactical Electronic Warfare Squadron 3 (VMAQ-3) was one of four Tactical Electronic Warfare Squadrons in the United States Marine Corps. The squadron consisted EA-6B Prowler jets and was tasked with conducting airborne electronic warfare. The squadron was based at Marine Corps Air Station Cherry Point, North Carolina and fell under the command of Marine Aircraft Group 14 (MAG-14) and the 2nd Marine Aircraft Wing (2nd MAW). The squadron was decommissioned on 11 May 2018 as the Marine Corps sunsets the EA-6B Prowler.

== Mission ==
Support the Marine Air-Ground Task Force (MAGTF) commander by conducting airborne electronic warfare, day or night, under all weather conditions during Expeditionary, Joint, or Combined operations.

== History ==
=== Early years ===
VMC-2 was formally commissioned at Marine Corps Air Station Cherry Point on 15 September 1952, evolving from the Airborne Early Warning and Electronic Countermeasures section of the Wing Headquarters Squadron. On 1 December 1955, the squadron was combined with Marine Photographic Squadron 2 (VMJ-2). In July 1975, VMCJ-2 was reorganized into separate electronic warfare and photoreconnaissance squadrons. VMAQ-2, based at MCAS Cherry Point, retained all electronic warfare aircraft, while the photo reconnaissance aircraft became VMFP-3, based at Marine Corps Air Station El Toro, California.

Some of the aircraft flown by VMAQ-3's tactical electronic warfare predecessors included; the AD-5Q Skyraider, the EF-10B Skyknight and the EA-6A Electric Intruder. In 1977, the Marine Corps received the first of its EA-6B "Prowlers,".

=== Reorganization ===
VMAQ-2 was organized into three Detachments; XRAY, YANKEE and ZULU to better support the Marine Corps' worldwide mission. On 1 July 1992, VMAQ-3 was commissioned and formed from the personnel and aircraft of VMAQ-2 Detachment ZULU. In October 1994, VMAQ-3 received The Association of Old Crows Tactical Electronic Warfare Squadron of the Year Award.

VMAQ-3 began integrating with Carrier Airwing One (CVW-1), in December 1994 and deployed to the Mediterranean Sea and Persian Gulf aboard the USS America (CV-66) in August 1995. The Squadron saw combat action in Operation Deliberate Force, Operation Deny Flight and Operation Decisive Endeavor. Additionally the squadron participated in Operation Southern Watch in the Persian Gulf.

Early 1997 found the Moondogs preparing to deploy to Aviano Air Base, Italy. From February to August the Moondogs conducted air operations over Bosnia in support of Operation Deliberate Guard while also supporting Operation Silver Wake, a Non-Combatant Evacuation Operation conducted in Albania.

In December 2000 to April 2001, VMAQ-3 deployed to Prince Sultan Air Base, Saudi Arabia in support of Operation Southern Watch.

=== Global War on Terror ===
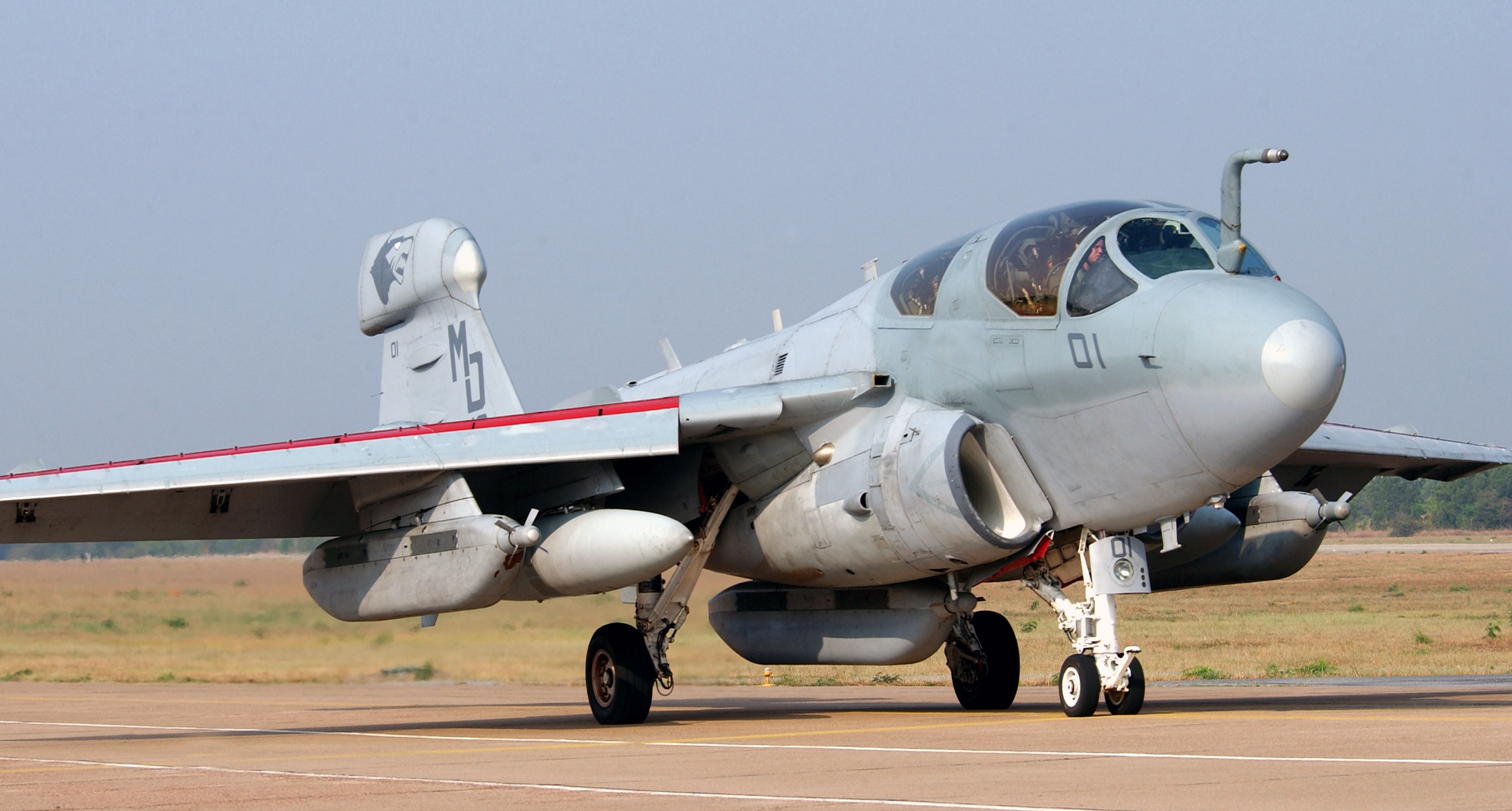
A VMAQ-3 EA-6B at Korat, in 2003.

From October 2001 to February 2002, VMAQ-3 deployed to Incirlik Air Base, Turkey to fly combat missions in the enforcement of United Nations resolutions and sanctions imposed upon Iraq by flying in support of Operation Northern Watch.

Early in 2003 the squadron was deployed to Marine Corps Air Station Iwakuni, Japan as part of the Unit Deployment Program. During this time the squadron participated in exercises in Thailand and Korea.

From January to August 2005 the squadron was deployed to Bagram Air Base, Afghanistan in support of Operation Enduring Freedom (OEF). VMAQ-3 was awarded a Meritorious Unit Commendation for its performance during this time.

From July 2006 to January 2007, the squadron supported Operation Iraqi Freedom where they sustained an operational tempo 700% greater than their average garrison optempo. VMAQ-3 flew over 3,900 hours in support of ground combat forces.

On 5 February 2010 aircraft from VMAQ-3 returned home to MCAS Cherry Point from Al Asad Airbase in western Iraq after a six-month deployment. They were the last Marine Corps aviation unit to leave Iraq after the Marine Corps turned over control of Al Anbar Governorate to the United States Army.

On 7 August 2015 the squadron deployed to MCAS Iwakuni, Japan in support of the Global War on Terror. They returned on 11 February 2016 to MCAS Cherry Point.

The squadron was decommissioned on 11 May 2018 at MCAS Cherry Point after 26 years of service.

== Unit awards ==
A unit citation or commendation is an award bestowed upon an organization for the action cited. Members of the unit who participated in said actions are allowed to wear on their uniforms the awarded unit citation. VMAQ-3 has been presented with the following awards:

== See also ==
- List of United States Marine Corps aircraft squadrons
- United States Marine Corps Aviation
- List of decommissioned United States Marine Corps aircraft squadrons
