= VMAQ-4 =

Marine Tactical Electronic Warfare Squadron 4
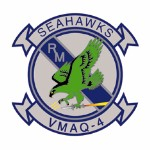
- VMAQ-4 Insignia
- Active: 7 November 1981 – 2 June 2017
- Country: United States of America
- Branch: United States Marine Corps
- Type: Marine Corps aviation
- Role: Electronic warfare ISTAR; SIGINT
- Size: Squadron
- Garrison/HQ: Marine Corps Air Station Cherry Point
- Nickname: Seahawks
- Tail Code: RM
- Engagements: Operation Deny Flight; Operation Decisive Endeavor; Operation Deliberate Guard; Operation Allied Force; Operation Southern Watch; Operation Iraqi Freedom; Operation Enduring Freedom; Operation Inherent Resolve

Marine Tactical Electronic Warfare Squadron 4 (VMAQ-4) was a United States Marine Corps electronic warfare squadron consisting of EA-6B Prowler jets. The squadron was last based at Marine Corps Air Station Cherry Point, North Carolina and fell under the command of Marine Aircraft Group 14 (MAG-14), and the 2nd Marine Aircraft Wing (2nd MAW). The squadron was decommissioned on 2 June 2017 as the Marine Corps retired the EA-6B Prowler.

== Mission ==
Support the Marine Air-Ground Task Force (MAGTF) Commander by conducting airborne electronic warfare, day or night, under all weather conditions during Expeditionary, Joint, or Combined operations.

== History ==
=== Korean War ===
On 15 September 1952, VMC-1 was established at Pohang-dong, Korea. While flying combat missions during the Korean War, VMC-1 flew the Douglas AD-4N Skyraider from 1952 to 1958. After flying the Skyraider, VMC-1 was combined with VMJ-1 on 31 July 1958 at Marine Corps Air Station El Toro, California. This combination, along with the formation of VMCJ-2, provided the Marine Corps with squadrons that were dedicated to perform electronic warfare and photoreconnaissance missions.

=== Vietnam War ===
During this new era, VMCJ-1 flew the first carrier-based all weather jet, the Douglas F3D-2Q Skynight. In 1962, the Navy and Marine Corps re-designated all of their aircraft, resulting in the plane's new designation of EF-10 Skynight. VMCJ-1's Skynights were the only jet-powered aircraft to fly combat missions in both the Korean and Vietnam Wars. From 14 April 1964 to 16 December 1965 VMCJ-1 flew its Vought RF-8A Crusaders in photoreconnaissance missions from the USS Ticonderoga (CVA-14), USS Constellation (CVA-64), USS Coral Sea (CVA-43) and the USS Oriskany (CVA-34). In April 1965 VMCJ-1 took its EF-10B aircraft from Marine Corps Air Station Iwakuni, Japan and joined Marine Aircraft Group 16 (MAG-16) at Danang to combat the increase of surface-to-air missiles in Vietnam. In July of that same year, six VMCJ-1 EF-10B's supported the first strike against a surface-to-air missile site in history. In November 1966, the Grumman EA-6A Electric Intruder was introduced at Danang and flew combat missions as far north as Hanoi and Haiphong and eventually phased out the EF-10B Skynight. VMCJ-1 retired its RF-8A Crusaders and received McDonald-Douglas RF-4B Phantom IIs to accomplish the photoreconnaissance mission. VMCJ-2 and VMCJ-3 also rotated through Danang with the VMCJ squadrons flying electronic attack and photoreconnaissance missions for thousands of strike missions for the remainder of the Vietnam War.

After the withdrawal of troops from Vietnam, VMCJ-1 was again flying missions from Navy aircraft carriers. During the fall of South Vietnam from 11 September 1973 to 31 December 1975, VMCJ-1 and VMCJ-1 Detachment 101 conducted missions from the USS Midway (CVA-41), eventually being replaced by VMCJ-2 in December 1975 when the USS Midway returned to her home port.

=== Reorganization and the 1980s ===
Due to force restructures, the Marine Corps decided to reorganize its squadrons to establish dedicated electronic attack and reconnaissance squadrons. The result was the establishment on 1 July 1974 of VMFP-3 at MCAS El Toro, which would then only fly the RF-4B Phantom II. All EA-6A aircraft were reorganized at MCAS Cherry Point, North Carolina, under the designation VMAQ-2. In September 1975, VMCJ-1 and its "Romeo Mike" tail flash were disestablished. During this time, the U.S. Navy had been receiving the newly designed Grumman EA-6B Prowler. The Marine Corps decided to maintain its war proven EA-6A's until the Prowler Improved Capability (ICAP) aircraft would be produced. In the early 1980s, the Marine Corps began receiving the ICAP EA-6B Prowlers. The growing number of Prowlers forced the Marine Corps to reduce its number of EA-6A's. To accomplish this, the Marine Corps moved its EA-6A's to the Marine Reserves at NAS Whidbey Island, Washington. This allowed the Marine Corps to maintain a proven electronic attack asset and on 21 May 1981 VMAQ-4 was established as a reserve squadron at NAS Whidbey Island flying the EA-6A. Many members of the new VMAQ-4 had flown EA-6As in Vietnam while in VMCJ-1, and when the time came to designate a tail code, the members reprised the old "RM" as a remembrance of VMCJ-1.

=== Gulf War and the 1990s ===
During the spring of 1991, VMAQ-4 transitioned from the EA-6A to the newer EA-6B Prowler. That summer, the squadron was activated for a Unit Deployment Program (UDP) to MCAS Iwakuni, Japan to help relieve the active duty squadron VMAQ-2 detachments that spent the previous 14 months overseas. During the UDP, VMAQ-4 had several "mini-det"s to places such as Kadena Air Force Base, Okinawa; RAAF Curtin, Australia; and Naval Air Station Cubi Point, Philippines. In 1991, VMAQ-4 received the "Outstanding Unit Awards" from the Association of Old Crows for the expedited transition from EA-6A to the EA-6B. After returning from the UDP and standing down for approximately 10 months as a reserve squadron, VMAQ-4 was restructured as an active duty squadron and moved to MCAS Cherry Point in October 1992. Around the same time, one year after Operation Desert Storm, VMAQ-2, detachments X (x-ray), Y (yankee), and Z (zulu) were divided into three squadrons, VMAQ-1, 2, and 3. This restructuring move gave the Marine Corps four full active duty EA-6B squadrons based out of MCAS Cherry Point, NC. From 1996 to 1998, VMAQ-4 and its "RM" tail flash flew in support of combat sorties from Aviano Air Base, Italy during Operation Deny Flight, Operation Decisive Endeavour, and Operation Deliberate Guard over the former Yugoslavia. In March 1999, with only three days notice, VMAQ-4 deployed again to Aviano, in support of NATO Operation Allied Force, joining VMAQ-2 and other U.S. Navy EA-6B squadrons flying hundreds of air strikes against the Serbian Air Force and Air Defense during the Kosovo Campaign. In 2002, VMAQ-4 deployed to Saudi Arabia in support of Operation Southern Watch.

=== Recent History ===
VMAQ-4 EA-6B Prowler at Al Asad Air Base, February 2005

In 2005, VMAQ-4 deployed to Al Asad Airbase, Iraq in support of Operation Iraqi Freedom. After a successful deployment, the squadron returned to Cherry Point in July and supported the fall WTI course in Yuma, AZ. In 2006, VMAQ-4 conducted a DEFTAC exercise in MCAS Yuma and later that year supported Exercise RED FLAG 06-02B.

In January 2007, VMAQ-4 deployed to MCAS Iwakuni from January to April, where they conducted DEFTAC and HARM exercises at Kadena AFB in Okinawa and participated in Operation FOAL EAGLE. VMAQ-4 returned from deployment in April 2007.

In August 2007, VMAQ-4 conducted a TACDEMO exercise at MCAS Yuma in order to prove the effectiveness of the integration of the EA-6B and the LITENING Targeting Pod. Later that fall, a VMAQ-4 detachment augmented WTI 1-08 in MCAS Yuma.

During December 2007, VMAQ-4 deployed to MCAS Yuma in support of Exercise DESERT TALON 01-08. Upon return to MCAS Cherry Point, the squadron spent the remainder of 2007 preparing for the upcoming deployment to Operation Iraqi Freedom in January 2008.

In January 2008, VMAQ-4 deployed to Al Asad Airbase for a six-month deployment in support of OIF 06-08.

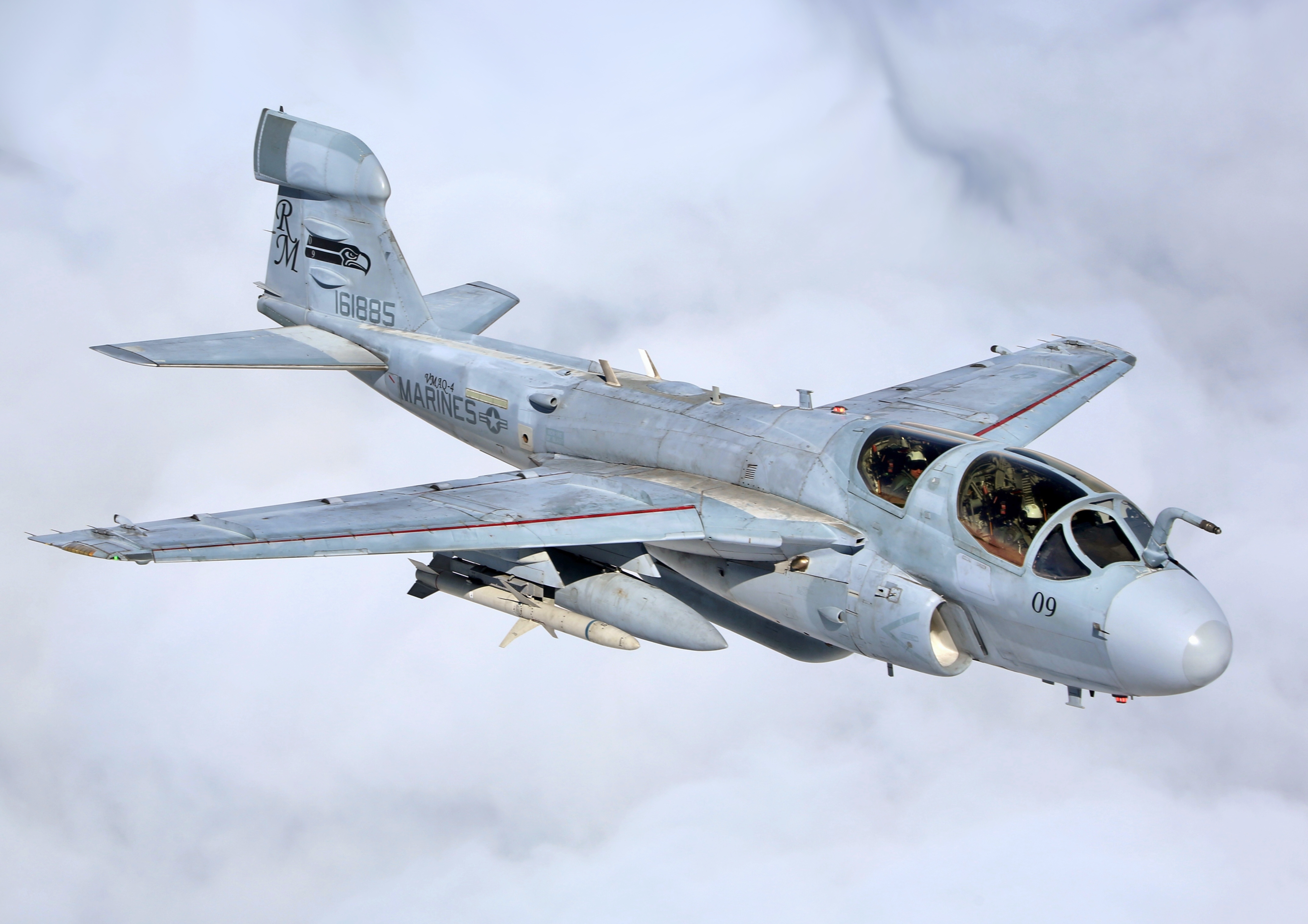
VMAQ-4 EA-6B in flight, 2016

In May 2011, VMAQ-4 deployed to Bagram Airfield in Afghanistan for a six-month deployment in support of OEF. They were the very first ICAP III Prowler squadron to go into Afghanistan.

In February 2013, VMAQ-4 deployed to Iwakuni Air Base in Iwakuni Japan.

In August 2014, VMAQ-4 deployed to Al Udeid Air Base in Qatar. From here they supported Operation Enduring Freedom, along with Operation Inherent Resolve which would start while they had been deployed there for only a few months. They returned home to MCAS Cherry Point, NC in February 2015.

In April 2016, VMAQ-4 deployed to Incirlik Air Base in Turkey for a 6 month deployment to support operations against ISIS in Iraq and Syria. This was the last operational deployment for VMAQ-4.

The squadron was decommissioned on 2 June 2017 at MCAS Cherry Point after 35 years service.

== See also ==
- United States Marine Corps Aviation
- List of decommissioned United States Marine Corps aircraft squadrons
