= Common Support Aircraft =

Concept aircraft

The Common Support Aircraft (CSA) was a proposed concept, which has been considered by the United States Navy since at least the early 1990s, to replace a number of different fixed-wing aircraft capable of operating from an aircraft carrier and which serve a "support" function, with a single type of aircraft or aircraft platform able to perform all support tasks.

Current roles deemed "support" by the Navy include: carrier on-board delivery (COD), electronic surveillance (ES), electronic warfare (EW), and airborne early warning (AEW). Another possible support role for a carrier-based aircraft is that of aerial refueling.

Among combat roles, while anti-submarine warfare (ASW) and anti-surface warfare (ASUW) are sometimes also considered "support"; fighter, bomber, and ground attack roles are not.

Current carrier-based fixed-wing support aircraft used by the US Navy, and which would presumably be replaced by the CSA, include:

- C-2 Greyhound, for COD
- E-2 Hawkeye, for AEW

Other support aircraft used by the US Navy in the recent past include:

- S-3 Viking, for ASW, ASUW, and recovery tanking
- ES-3 Shadow, for ES
- EA-6B Prowler, for EW
- KA-6D, for mission tanking
