= Grumman EA-6B Prowler =

American carrier-based electronic warfare aircraft

EA-6B Prowler
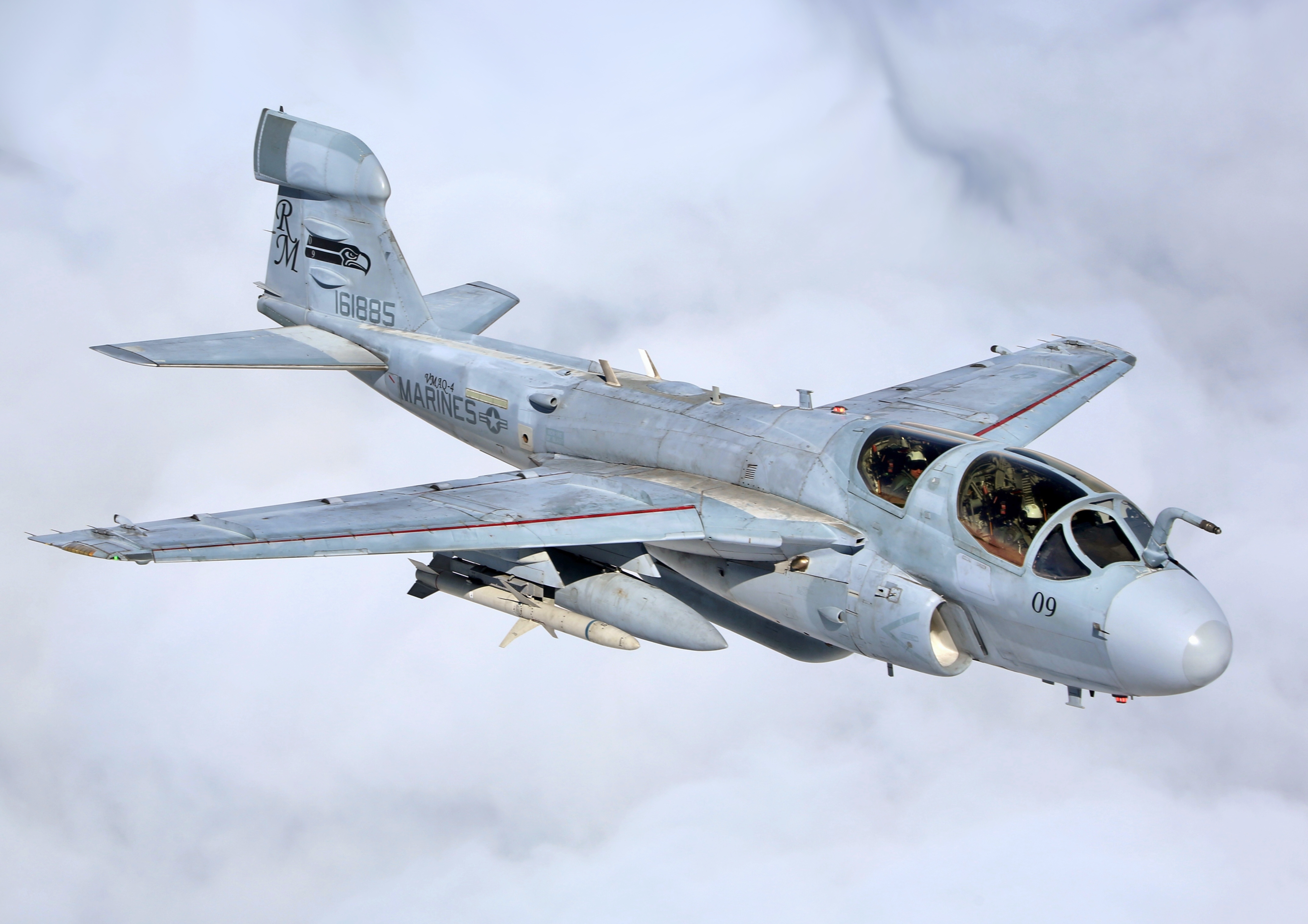
- Grumman EA-6B Prowler in flight

General information
- Type: Electronic warfare/Attack aircraft
- Manufacturer: Grumman; Northrop Grumman
- Status: Retired
- Primary users: United States Navy (historical) United States Marine Corps (historical)
- Number built: 170

History
- Manufactured: 1966-1991
- Introduction date: July 1971
- First flight: 25 May 1968
- Retired: 2015 (USN); March 2019 (USMC)
- Developed from: Grumman A-6 Intruder

The Northrop Grumman (formerly Grumman) EA-6B Prowler is a twin-engined, four-seat, mid-wing electronic-warfare aircraft. Operated by both the United States Marine Corps and United States Navy between 1971 and 2019, it was derived from the A-6 Intruder airframe.

The aircraft's immediate predecessor, the EA-6A, was an interim conversion of the A-6 airframe to perform electronic warfare missions during the 1960s. In 1966, work on the more advanced EA-6B commenced. It featured an enlarged, four-seat cockpit, a fully integrated electronic-warfare system, and advanced electronic countermeasures. Furthermore, it was suitable for long-range, all-weather, carrier-based operations in addition to land-based uses. Typically, the aircrew of an EA-6B consisted of a single pilot and three electronic countermeasures officers, though having only two ECMOs on missions was not uncommon. It was capable of firing anti-radiation missiles (ARMs), such as the AGM-88 HARM. Although designed as an electronic-warfare and command-and-control aircraft for air strike missions, the EA-6B was also capable of attacking some surface targets on its own, in particular enemy radar sites and surface-to-air missile launchers. In addition, the EA-6B was capable of gathering electronic signals intelligence.

On 25 May 1968, the EA-6B performed its maiden flight; three prototypes were converted from A-6As, while five EA-6Bs participated in the development program. During July 1971, Tactical Electronic Warfare Squadron 132 (VAQ-132) became the first operational squadron to be equipped with the type; the EA-6B's first combat deployment took place 11 months later in the latter half of the Vietnam War. It frequently carried out electronic-warfare operations, such as the jamming of enemy radar systems, as well as the gathering of radio intelligence on enemy radar and air defense systems. The EA-6B also played an active role during the 1983 invasion of Grenada, Operation El Dorado Canyon (Libya, 1986), Operation Praying Mantis (Iran, 1988), and Operation Desert Storm (Iraq, 1991). It also was called on during the Operation Enduring Freedom (Afghanistan, 2001–2014) and Operation Inherent Resolve (Iraq, 2014), in addition to other lower-intensity duties.

By the 21st century, efforts to eventually replace the EA-6B had been launched, such as the abortive Common Support Aircraft initiative. As a result of the type being heavily used during its lengthy service life, the EA-6B had become a relatively high-maintenance aircraft during its latter years of service. Nevertheless, it had undergone frequent equipment upgrades throughout its service life; major programs included the Advanced Capability EA-6B and the Improved Capability (ICAP) II schemes. The type's final overseas deployment occurred in late 2014; the EA-6B was withdrawn from U.S. Navy service in June 2015, while the U.S. Marine Corps retired its last aircraft in March 2019. It has been effectively succeeded by the EA-18G Growler, an electronic-warfare derivative of the F/A-18F Super Hornet.

== Development ==
=== Origins ===
By the 1960s, the United States Marine Corps (USMC) was operating several aging electronic countermeasure (ECM) platforms, including the EF-10B Skyknight and AD Skyraider. The service sought to procure more modern platforms; this desire led to the development of the EA-6A "Electric Intruder". The EA-6A was a direct conversion of the standard Grumman A-6 Intruder airframe, equipped with a twin-seat cockpit along with assorted electronic-warfare (EW) equipment. During December 1965, the EA-6A entered squadron service with the USMC; shortly thereafter, it saw action in Operation Rolling Thunder during the Vietnam War. In total, three USMC squadrons were equipped with the type in the conflict; 27 EA-6As were produced, 15 of which were newly manufactured, while the others were conversions. The majority of these EA-6As were retired from service in the 1970s; the final handful of aircraft were operated by two electronic-attack "aggressor" squadrons of the United States Navy (USN). These last examples were finally retired during the 1990s. The EA-6A was essentially an interim warplane until the more-advanced EA-6B could be designed and built.

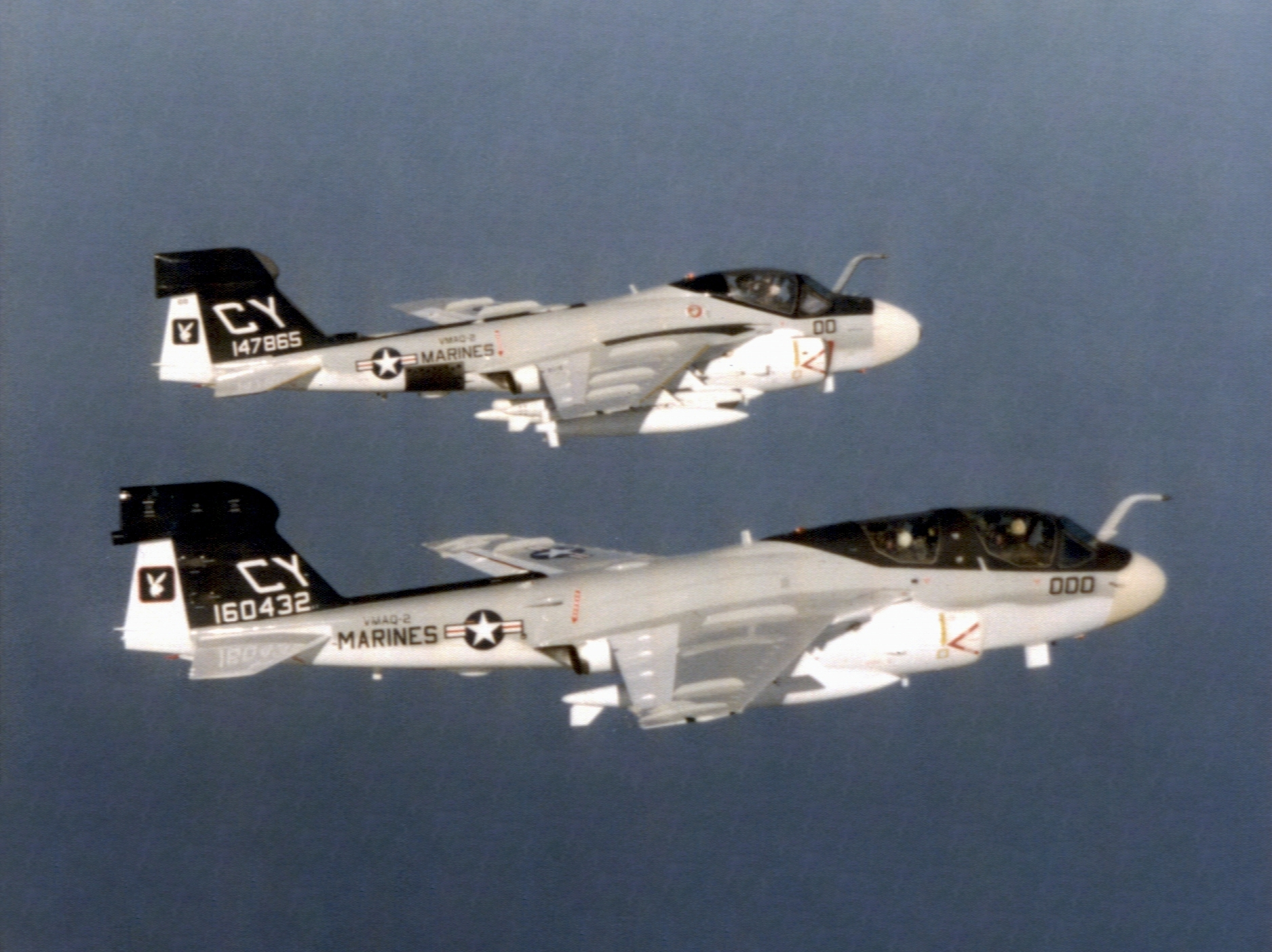
The two-seat EA-6A (top) was followed by the four-seat EA-6B Prowler (bottom)

During 1966, development of the EA-6B, a substantially redesigned and more advanced model, commenced as a replacement for the EKA-3B Skywarriors then being operated by the USN. The redesign included the lengthening of the forward fuselage to create a rear area that accommodated a larger four-seat cockpit, while an antenna fairing was added to the tip of the vertical stabilizer. The EA-6B was powered by a pair of Pratt & Whitney J52 turbojet engines, which enabled it to attain high subsonic speeds. On 14 November 1966, Grumman was awarded a $12.7 million contract to develop an EA-6B prototype. On 25 May 1968, the EA-6B performed its maiden flight; it entered regular service on aircraft carriers during July 1971. Three prototype EA-6Bs were converted from A-6As, and five EA-6Bs were developmental airplanes. Between 1966 and 1991, 170 EA-6B production aircraft were manufactured.

The EA-6B was continually upgraded over the years. The first such upgrade was named "expanded capability" (EXCAP) beginning in 1973. Then came "improved capability" (ICAP) in 1976 and ICAP II in 1980. The ICAP II upgrade provided the EA-6B with the capability of firing Shrike missiles and AGM-88 HARM missiles.

=== Advanced Capability EA-6B ===
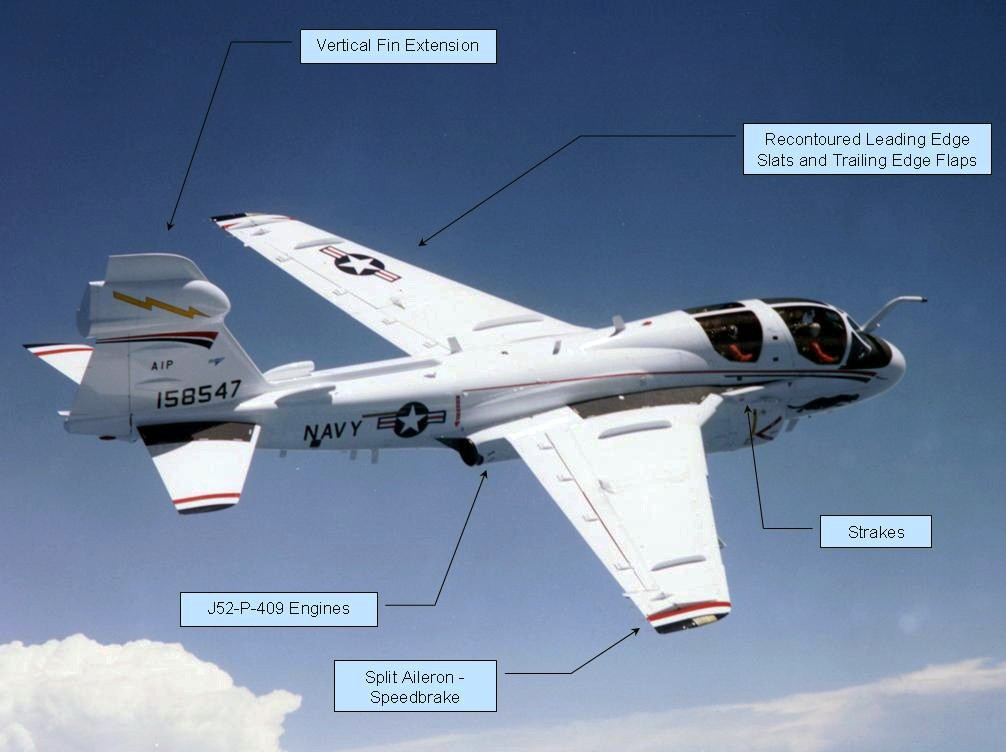
EA-6B ADVCAP

The Advanced Capability EA-6B Prowler (ADVCAP) was a development program initiated to improve the flying qualities of the EA-6B and to upgrade the avionics and electronic-warfare systems. The intention was to modify all EA-6Bs into the ADVCAP configuration, but the program was removed from the Fiscal Year 1995 budget due to financial pressure from competing Department of Defense acquisition programs.

The ADVCAP development program was initiated in the late 1980s and was broken into three distinct phases: Full-scale Development (FSD), Vehicle Enhancement Program (VEP), and Avionics Improvement Program. FSD served primarily to evaluate the new AN/ALQ-149 Electronic Warfare System. The program used a slightly modified EA-6B to house the new system.

The VEP added numerous changes to the aircraft to address deficiencies with the original EA-6B flying qualities, particularly lateral-directional problems that hampered recovery from out-of-control flight. Bureau Number 158542 was used. Changes included:

- Leading-edge strakes (to improve directional stability)
- Fin pod extension (to improve directional stability)
- Ailerons (to improve slow speed lateral control)
- Recontoured leading-edge slats and trailing-edge flaps (to compensate for an increase in gross weight)
- Two additional wing stations on the outer wing panel (for jamming pods only)
- New J52-P-409 engines (increased thrust by 2,000 lbf (8.9 kN) per engine)
- New digital standard automatic flight-control system

The added modifications increased the aircraft gross weight about 2,000 lb (910 kg) and shifted the center of gravity (CG) 3% MAC aft of the baseline EA-6B. In previous models, when operating at sustained high angles of attack, fuel migration would cause additional shifts in CG with the result that the aircraft had slightly negative longitudinal static stability. Results of flight tests of the new configuration showed greatly improved flying qualities and the rearward shift of the CG had minimal impact.

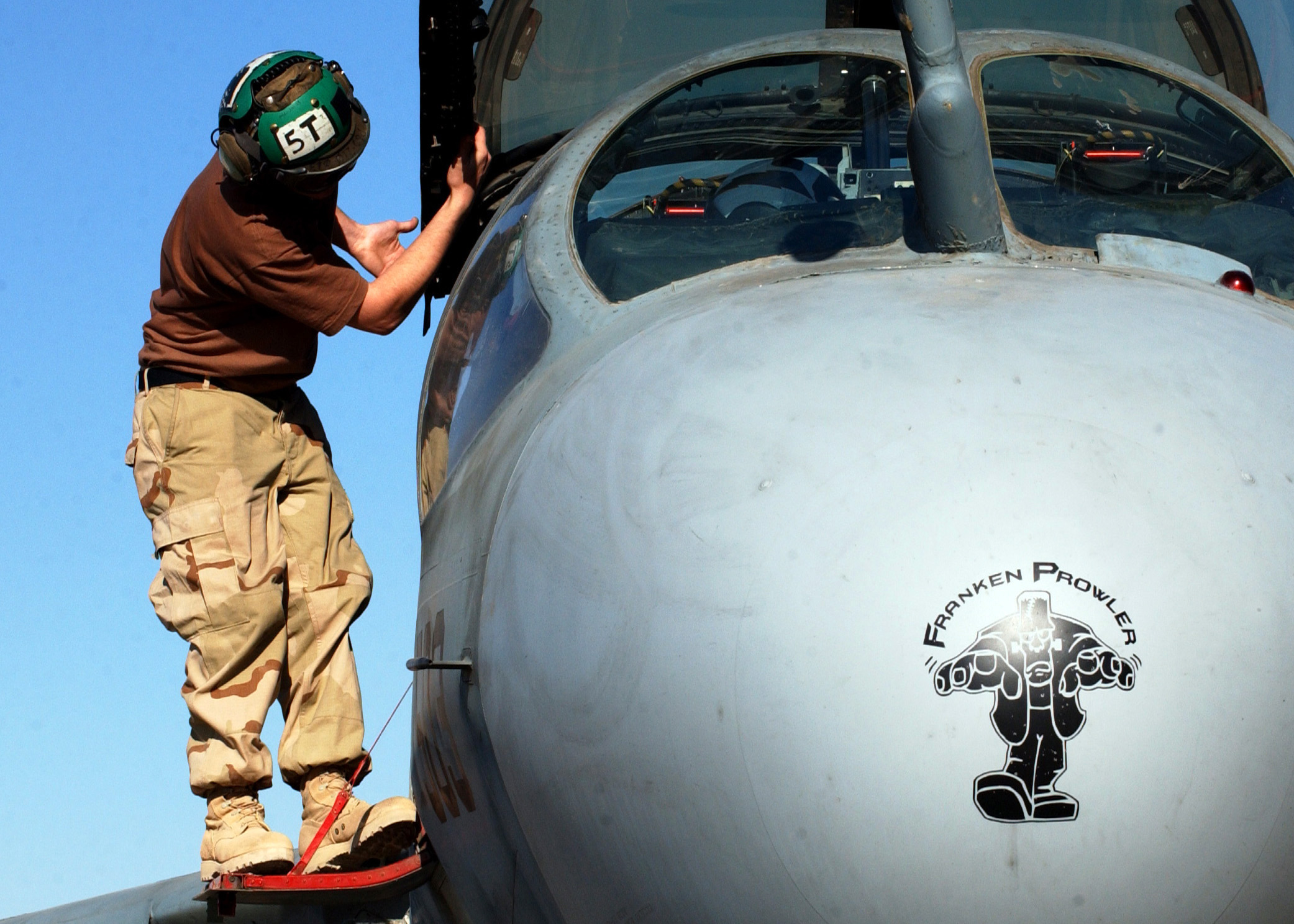
"FrankenProwler" during a preflight inspection at Al Asad Air Base, Iraq

The AIP prototype (bureau number 158547) represented the final ADVCAP configuration, incorporating all of the FSD and VEP modifications plus a completely new avionics suite, which added multifunction displays to all crew positions, a head-up display for the pilot, and dual global positioning/inertial navigation systems. The initial joint test phase between the contractor and the USN test pilots were completed successfully with few deficiencies.

After the program was canceled, the three experimental Prowlers, BuNo 156482, 158542, and 158547, were mothballed until 1999. Over the next several years, the three aircraft were dismantled and reassembled to create a single aircraft, b/n 158542, which the USN dubbed "FrankenProwler". It was returned to active service on 23 March 2005.

=== Improved Capability (ICAP) III ===
Northrop Grumman received contracts from the USN to deliver new electronic countermeasures gear to Prowler squadrons; the heart of each ICAP III set consists of the ALQ-218 receiver and new software that provides more precise selective-reactive radar jamming and deception and threat location. The ICAP III sets also are equipped with the multifunction information distribution system, which includes the Link 16 data-link system. Northrop delivered two lots and delivered two more beginning in 2010. The EA-6B Prowlers in service toward the end of their service lives were the ICAP III version, carrying the ALQ-99 tactical jamming system.

== Design ==
Designed for carrier-based and advanced-base operations, the EA-6B was a fully integrated electronic-warfare system combining long-range, all-weather capabilities with advanced electronic countermeasures. A forward equipment bay and pod-shaped fairing on the vertical fin housed the additional avionics equipment. It was the primary electronic warfare aircraft for the USN and USMC. The EA-6B's primary mission was to support ground-attack strikes by disrupting enemy electromagnetic activity. As a secondary mission, it could also gather tactical electronic intelligence within a combat zone, and another secondary mission was attacking enemy radar sites with antiradiation missiles.

The Prowler was operated by a crew of four, a pilot and three electronic countermeasures officers (ECMOs). The two ECMOs in the rear cockpit operated the Prowler's primary jamming equipment, while the ECMO in the right front seat handled navigation, communications, and defensive electronic countermeasures. Powered by two non-afterburning Pratt & Whitney J52-P-408A turbojet engines, it was capable of speeds above 500 knots (580 mph; 930 km/h), with a range over 1,000 nmi (1,200 mi; 1,900 km).

Design particulars included the refueling probe being asymmetrical, appearing bent to the right to improve pilot visibility over that of the A-6 Intruder. It contained an antenna near its root. The canopy had a shading of gold to protect the crew against the radio emissions that the electronic-warfare equipment produces.

== Operational history ==
=== 20th century ===
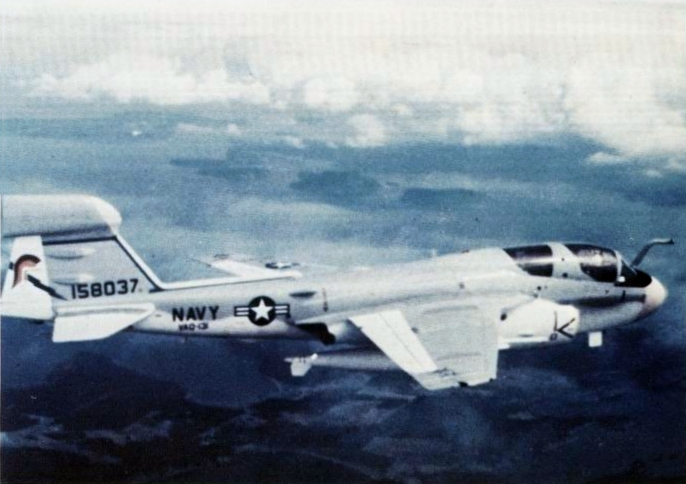
VAQ-131 was the second squadron to deploy to Vietnam, in September 1972.

In September 1970, the EA-6B entered service with Fleet Replacement Squadron VAQ-129; 10 months later, Tactical Electronic Warfare Squadron 132 (VAQ-132) became the first operational squadron to be equipped with the type; during June 1972, VAQ-132 began its first combat deployment to Vietnam on America; it was promptly followed by VAQ-131 on Enterprise and VAQ-134 on Constellation. Two squadrons of Prowlers flew 720 sorties during the Vietnam War in support of USN attack aircraft, as well as the Boeing B-52 Stratofortress bombers of the United States Air Force; typically, they suppressed enemy air defenses just prior to the attack/bomber aircraft deploying their own payloads.

During the 1983 invasion of Grenada, four Prowlers supported the operation from USS Independence (CV-62). Two years later, in response to the Achille Lauro hijacking, Prowlers from USS Saratoga (CV-60) provided ESM support during the interception of the EgyptAir 737 carrying four of the hijackers on 10 October 1985.

Prowlers jammed Libyan radar and air defenses during Operation El Dorado Canyon in April 1986. Similarly, Prowlers from VAQ-135 on USS Enterprise (CVN-65) jammed Iranian ground control intercept radars, surface-to-air missile-guidance radars, and communication systems during Operation Praying Mantis on 18 April 1988.

During 1991, 39 EA-6Bs were involved in Operation Desert Storm; 27 were based on six aircraft carriers, while 12 were from USMC shore bases. During 4,600 flight hours, Prowlers fired over 150 AGM-88 HARM missiles, the majority of which were targeted at radars and communications nodes across Iraqi's integrated air defense system. In total, USN Prowlers flew 1,132 sorties, while USMC EA-6Bs flew 516 sorties; no losses were incurred.

Following the retirement of the EF-111 Raven in 1998, the EA-6B was the only dedicated aerial radar-jammer aircraft of the United States Armed Forces, until the fielding of the Navy's EA-18G Growler in 2009. The EA-6B was flown in almost all American combat operations from 1972 until its retirement in 2019 and was frequently flown in support of missions undertaken by the United States Air Force (USAF).

=== 21st century ===
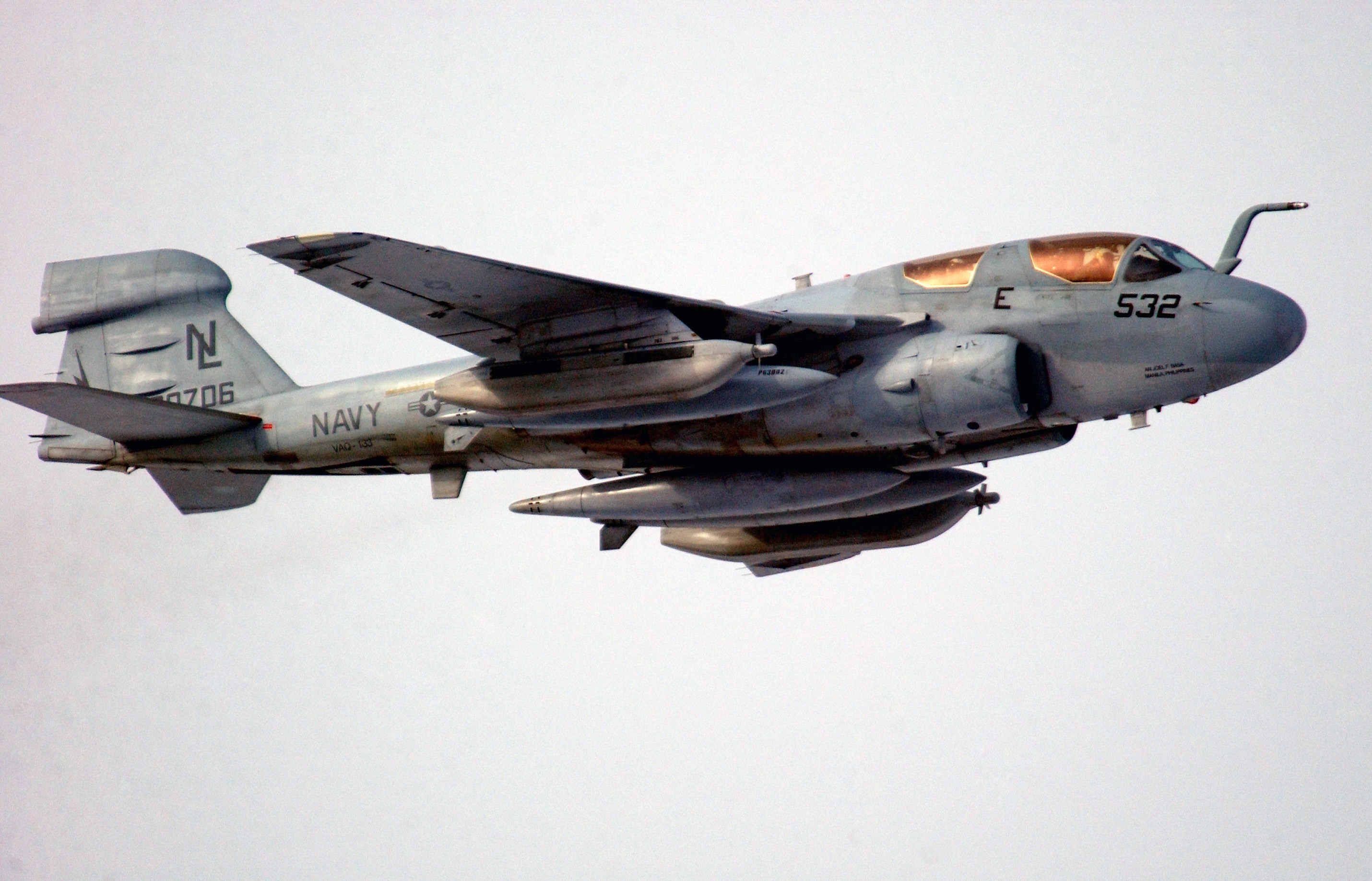
EA-6B takes off from Eielson AFB: Note the gold tint of the canopy for protection from electromagnetic interference and prevents some EM emissions.

In 2001, 124 Prowlers remained, divided between 12 USN, four USMC, and four joint USN-USAF "Expeditionary" squadrons. A Joint Chiefs of Staff staff study recommended that the EF-111 Raven be retired to reduce the types of aircraft dedicated to the same mission, which led to an Office of the Secretary of Defense program memorandum to establish four land-based "expeditionary" Prowler squadrons to meet the needs of the Air Force. Between 2004 and 2014, the USAF augmented USN Prowler units with electronic warfare officers from the 388th and 390th Electronic Combat Squadrons assigned to the 366th Operations Group at Mountain Home AFB, Idaho.

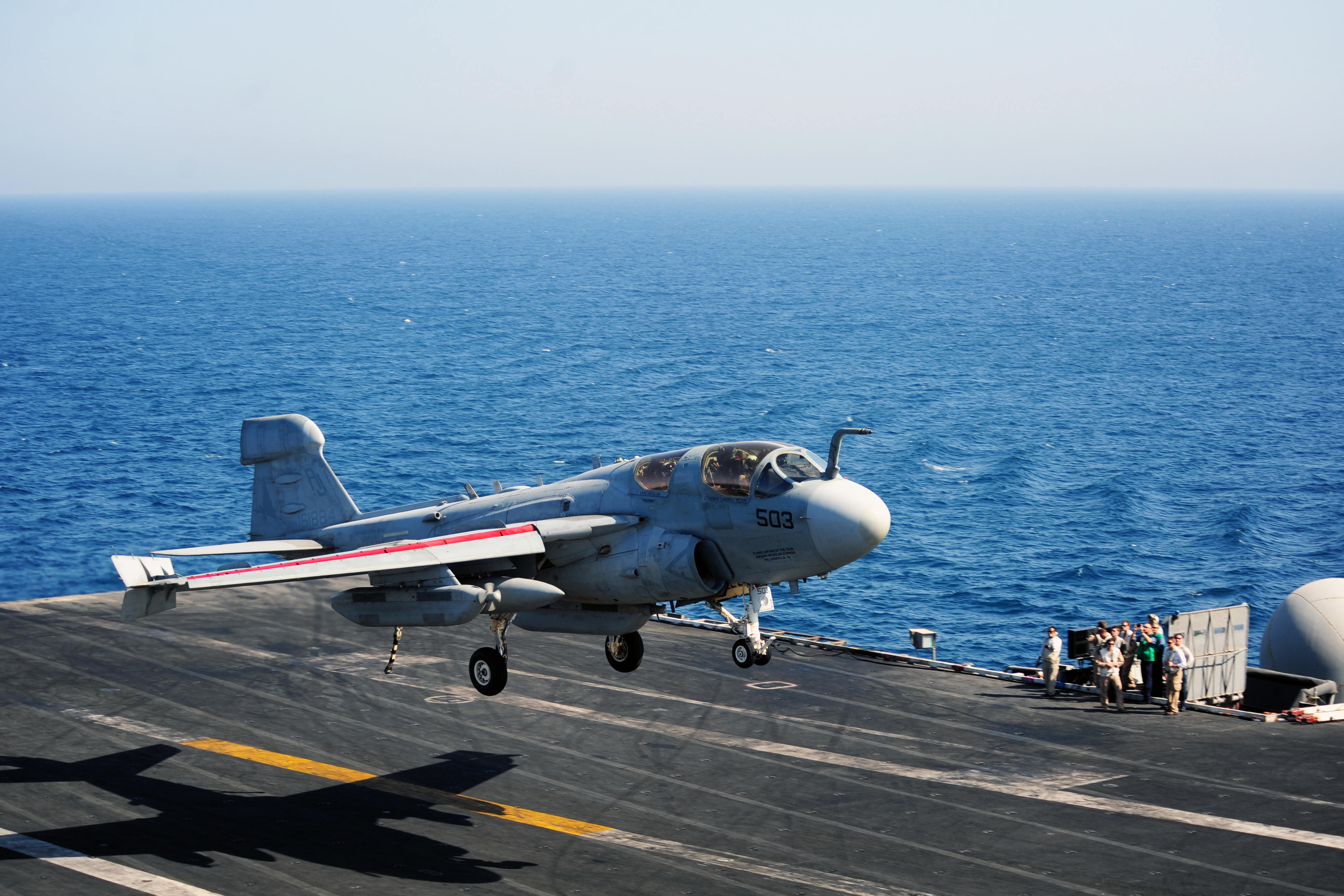
An EA-6B Prowler lands on the flight deck of the aircraft carrier USS George H. W. Bush (CVN 77).

In 2007, the Prowler reportedly had been used in counter-improvised explosive device operations in the conflict in Afghanistan for several years by jamming remote detonation devices such as garage-door openers or cellular telephones. Two Prowler squadrons were also based in Iraq, working with the same mission. According to Chuck Pfarrer in his book SEAL Target Geronimo, an EA-6B was also used to jam Pakistani radar and assist the two MH-60 Black Hawk stealth helicopters and two Chinook helicopters raiding Osama Bin Laden's compound in Operation Neptune Spear.

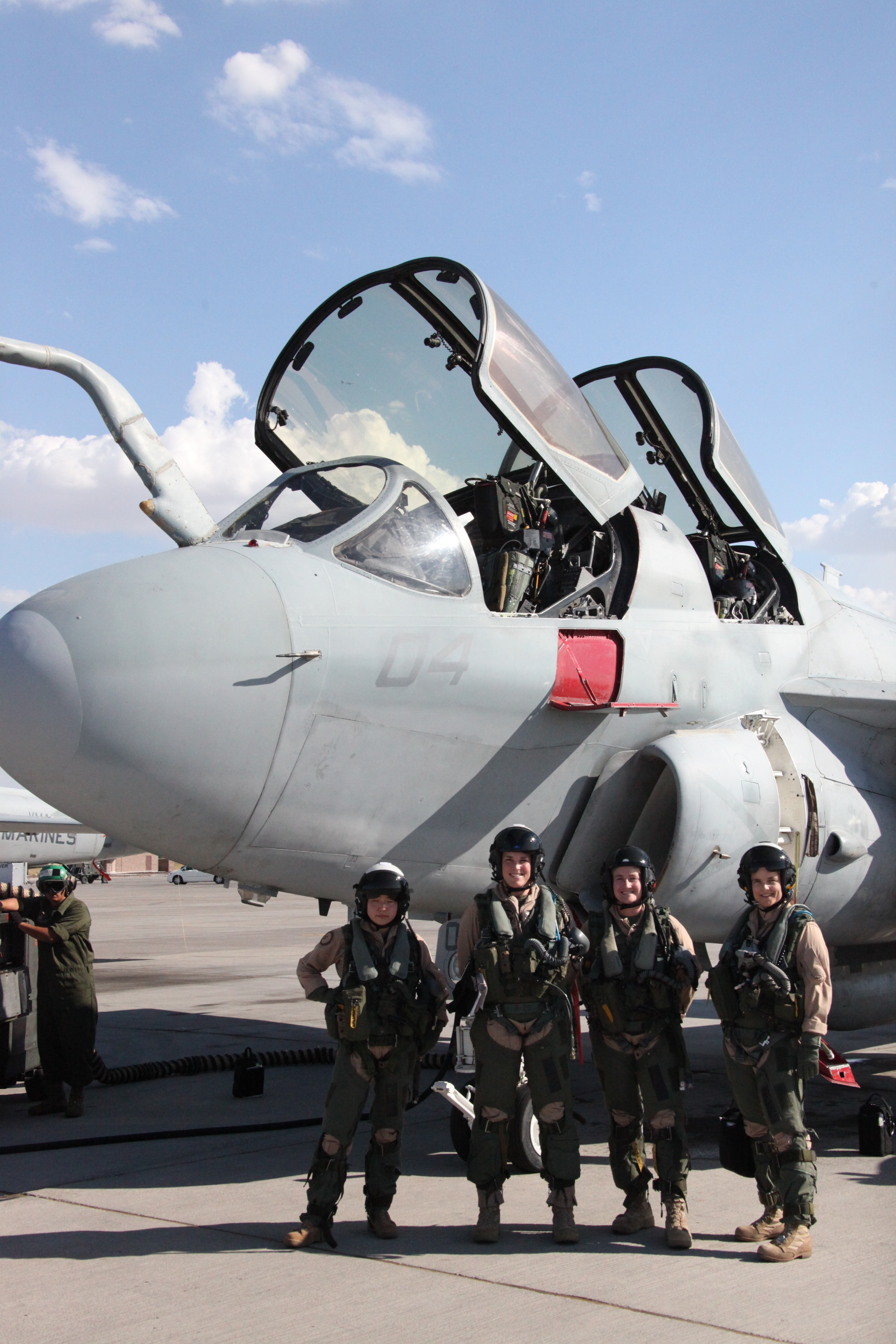
USMC-100729-M-0381B-008

During June 2014, VMAQ-3 began flying Prowler missions against Islamic State militants over Iraq. Two months later, Operation Inherent Resolve began and VMAQ-4 took over. The Prowlers were the first USMC aircraft in Syria, where they were involved in strike packages, air drops, and electronic-warfare requirements against militants. By January 2015, the five aircraft of VMAQ-4 had flown 800 hours during 110 sorties in support of operations in both countries, including supporting coalition airstrikes and providing EW support for Iraqi Army forces to degrade enemy systems. Marine Prowlers had not dropped munitions themselves, and host nations basing them have not been revealed.

Though once considered being replaced by Common Support Aircraft, that plan failed to materialize. In 2009, the USN EA-6B Prowler community began transitioning to the EA-18G Growler, an electronic-warfare derivative of the F/A-18F Super Hornet. All but one of the active-duty USN EA-6B squadrons were based at Naval Air Station Whidbey Island. VAQ-136 was stationed at Naval Air Facility Atsugi, Japan, as part of Carrier Air Wing 5, the forward deployed naval forces air wing that embarks aboard the Japan-based George Washington. VAQ-209, the Navy Reserve's sole EA-6B squadron, was stationed at Naval Air Facility Washington, Maryland. All USMC EA-6B squadrons were located at Marine Corps Air Station Cherry Point, North Carolina.

During 2013, the USN planned to fly the EA-6B until 2015, while the USMC expected to phase out the Prowler in March 2019. The last Navy deployment was on George H.W. Bush in November 2014, with VAQ-134. The USN's last operational flight took place on 27 May 2015. NAS Whidbey held a retirement commemoration for the EA-6B from 25 to 27 June 2015 of the EA-6B culminating on the last day with the Navy's last operational EA-6B Prowler, bureau number 163890, taking off from NAS Whidbey Island.

In April 2016, a squadron of EA-6B Prowlers from Marine Corps Tactical Electronic Warfare Squadron 4 (VMAQ-4), based at Marine Corps Air Station Cherry Point, North Carolina, was deployed to Incirlik Air Base, Turkey, for operations over Syria. U.S. European Command confirmed that the deployment was expected to last through September 2016. The Center for Strategic and International Studies suggested that the Prowlers may be used to prevent Russian and Syrian air=defense systems from tracking U.S. and coalition aircraft.

During November 2018, Prowlers of VMAQ-2 completed their last operational deployment to Al Udeid Air Base, Qatar. The squadron, being the last equipped with the EA-6B, was disbanded on 8 March 2019, after which its remaining two Prowlers were reallocated to museums.

The USMC's four members of VAMQ-2 flew the last EA-6B on its final flight on 14 March 2019 from their station at Cherry Point, North Carolina, to the Steven F. Udvar-Hazy Center.

== Operators ==
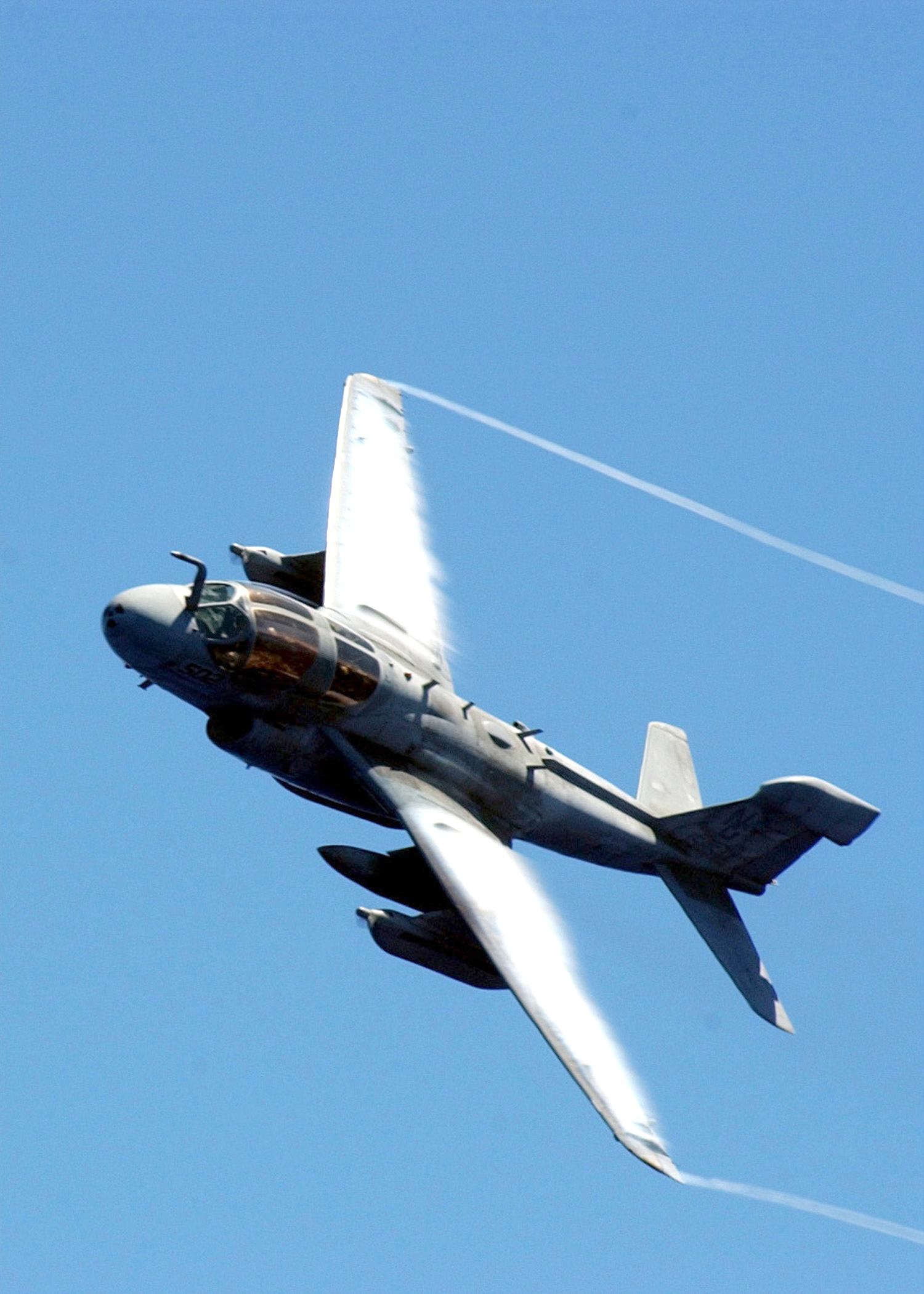
An EA-6B Prowler from VAQ-138 is carrying two wing-mounted jamming pods.

The EA-6B Prowler was operated by the U.S. Armed Forces with squadrons in the USMC and USN.

=== USMC squadrons ===
VMAQ squadrons operated the EA-6B Prowler. Each of the three squadrons operated five aircraft; the squadrons were land-based, although they were capable of operating aboard U.S. Navy aircraft carriers and did so in the past.

In 2013, VMAQ-1 converted from an active to a training squadron as the USN stopped training on the Prowler and switched over to the Growler. The Marine Training Squadron first received students for training in October 2013 and produced its first training flights in April 2014.

Squadron Name	Insignia	Nickname	Dates operated	Senior Command	Station
VMAQT-1		Banshees	1992–2016	MAG-14, 2nd MAW	MCAS Cherry Point, NC
VMAQ-2		Playboys	1977-2019	MAG-14, 2nd MAW	MCAS Cherry Point, NC
VMAQ-3		Moon Dogs	1992–2018	MAG-14, 2nd MAW	MCAS Cherry Point, NC
VMAQ-4		Seahawks	1981–2017	MAG-14, 2nd MAW	MCAS Cherry Point, NC

In 2008, the USMC investigated an electronic attack role for the Lockheed Martin F-35 Lightning II to replace their Prowlers. The Marines began retiring the EA-6 in 2016 and replaced them with the Marine Air-Ground Task Force Electronic Warfare (MAGTF-EW) concept, which calls for a medium to high-altitude long-endurance unmanned aerial vehicle to off-load at least some of the electronic warfare mission.

In November 2018, VMAQ-2 returned from performing the final deployed operations of USMC Prowlers. The Marines retired the aircraft on 8 March 2019, with some placed in storage and on static display at the Smithsonian Institution Steven F. Udvar-Hazy Center of the National Air and Space Museum in Chantilly, Virginia and the Frontiers of Flight Museum at Dallas Love Field.

=== USN squadrons ===
While in U.S. Navy service four EA-6B Prowlers were typically assigned to a Tactical Electronic Warfare Squadron. These Navy Electronic Attack squadrons carried the letters VAQ (V-fixed wing, A-attack, Q-electronic); most of these squadrons were carrier-based, while others were "expeditionary" and deployed to overseas land bases.

Squadron Name	Insignia	Nickname	Dates Operated	Carrier air wing	Station	Notes
VAQ-129		Vikings	1971–2015	Fleet Replacement Squadron	NAS Whidbey Island	Trained both Marine, Air Force, and Navy crews in the EA-6B and the EA-18G
VAQ-130		Zappers	1975–2011	CVW-3	NAS Whidbey Island	EA-6B replaced by EA-18G
VAQ-131		Lancers	1971–2015	CVW-2	NAS Whidbey Island	EA-6B replaced by EA-18G
VAQ-132		Scorpions	1971–2009	CVW-17	NAS Whidbey Island	EA-6B replaced by EA-18G
VAQ-133		Wizards	1971–2014	CVW-9	NAS Whidbey Island	EA-6B replaced by EA-18G
VAQ-134		Garudas	1972–2015	CVW-8	NAS Whidbey Island	EA-6B replaced by EA-18G.
VAQ-135		Black Ravens	1973–2010		NAS Whidbey Island	EA-6B replaced by EA-18G
VAQ-136		Gauntlets	1973–2012		NAS Whidbey Island	EA-6B replaced by EA-18G
VAQ-137		Rooks	1973–2012	CVW-1	NAS Whidbey Island	EA-6B replaced by EA-18G
VAQ-138		Yellow Jackets	1976–2009		N/A	EA-6B replaced by EA-18G
VAQ-139		Cougars	1983–2011	CVW-17	NAS Whidbey Island	EA-6B replaced by EA-18G
VAQ-140		Patriots	1985–2014	CVW-7	NAS Whidbey Island	EA-6B replaced by EA-18G
VAQ-141		Shadowhawks	1987–2009	CVW-5	Naval Air Facility (NAF) Atsugi	EA-6B replaced by EA-18G
VAQ-142		Gray Wolves	1997–2015	CVW-11	NAS Whidbey Island	EA-6B replaced by EA-18G
VAQ-209		Star Warriors	1977–2013	Reserve Tactical Support Wing	NAS Whidbey Island	EA-6B replaced by EA-18G

==== Disestablished Squadrons ====
VAQ-128: Established as an expeditionary squadron in October 1997, utilizing the insignia and heritage of the former A-6 Intruder Fleet Replacement Squadron at NAS Whidbey Island. Disestablished in September 2004 due to budget reductions.

VAQ-309: Established as a Naval Air Reserve Force squadron at NAS Whidbey Island in 1979 with EA-6A aircraft, transitioning to the EA-6B in 1989 as part of Carrier Air Wing Reserve THIRTY (CVWR-30). Disestablished on 31 Dec 1994 following the decommissioning of CVWR-30 due to budget cuts; aircraft returned to the Regular Navy.

== Notable accidents ==
While no Prowler was ever lost during combat operations, nearly fifty of the 170 aircraft built were destroyed in various accidents as of 2013. In 1998, a memorial at Naval Air Station Whidbey Island was dedicated to 44 crew members lost in EA-6B aircraft accidents.

- On 26 May 1981, a USMC EA-6B crashed onto the flight deck of Nimitz and caused a fire, killing 14 crewmen and injuring 45 others. The Prowler was running out of fuel after a missed approach ("bolter" in Navy parlance), and its crash and the subsequent fire and explosions destroyed or damaged 19 other aircraft.
- On 5 December 1988 at 0215 hours, a US Navy EA-6B was reported missing after taking off on a training exercise from the USS Constellation (CV-64), approximately 900 miles west of San Diego, California. A search and rescue team reported seeing debris, but the debris sank before a recovery operation could be undertaken. All four of the crew were killed.
- On 3 November 1992, a US Navy EA-6B (161776, P99 First lCAP ll) from VAQ 129 crashed after takeoff outside of Naval Air Facility, El Centro killing all three crew members aboard.
- On 3 February 1998, a USMC EA-6B, BuNo 163045, from VMAQ-2 struck the cables of a cable car system in Cavalese, Italy. The crew broke rules to fly low at high speed in mountainous terrain, cut the cables and caused the death of 20 people when a cable car running on the line fell to the ground. The aircraft also suffered severe damage to its vertical stabilizer and wings as a result of striking the cable, but was landed successfully at Aviano Air Base. Two members of the crew were court-martialed a second time for obstruction of justice and conduct unbecoming an officer and a gentleman, because they had destroyed a videotape recorded on the plane the day of the disaster.
- On 8 November 1998, a USN EA-6B landed on a Lockheed S-3 Viking during night landing qualifications on Enterprise; four crew members were killed.
- On 11 March 2013, a USN EA-6B of Electronic Attack Squadron VAQ-129 in Washington State, crashed during a training exercise. Three crew members were killed. A year later, an investigation determined that the Prowler experienced a controlled flight into terrain that was due to pilot error.

== Variants ==
- EA-6A: Two early production A-6As converted to EA-6As as prototypes. Total of 25 EA-6As were built, including 10 conversions of A-6As and 15 production EA-6As.
- EA-6B: Three A-6As converted as initial prototypes. Total of 170 EA-6Bs were built.

== Aircraft on display ==
=== Japan ===
- 160786 – EA-6B on static display at Naval Air Facility Atsugi in Yamato, Kanagawa.

=== United States ===
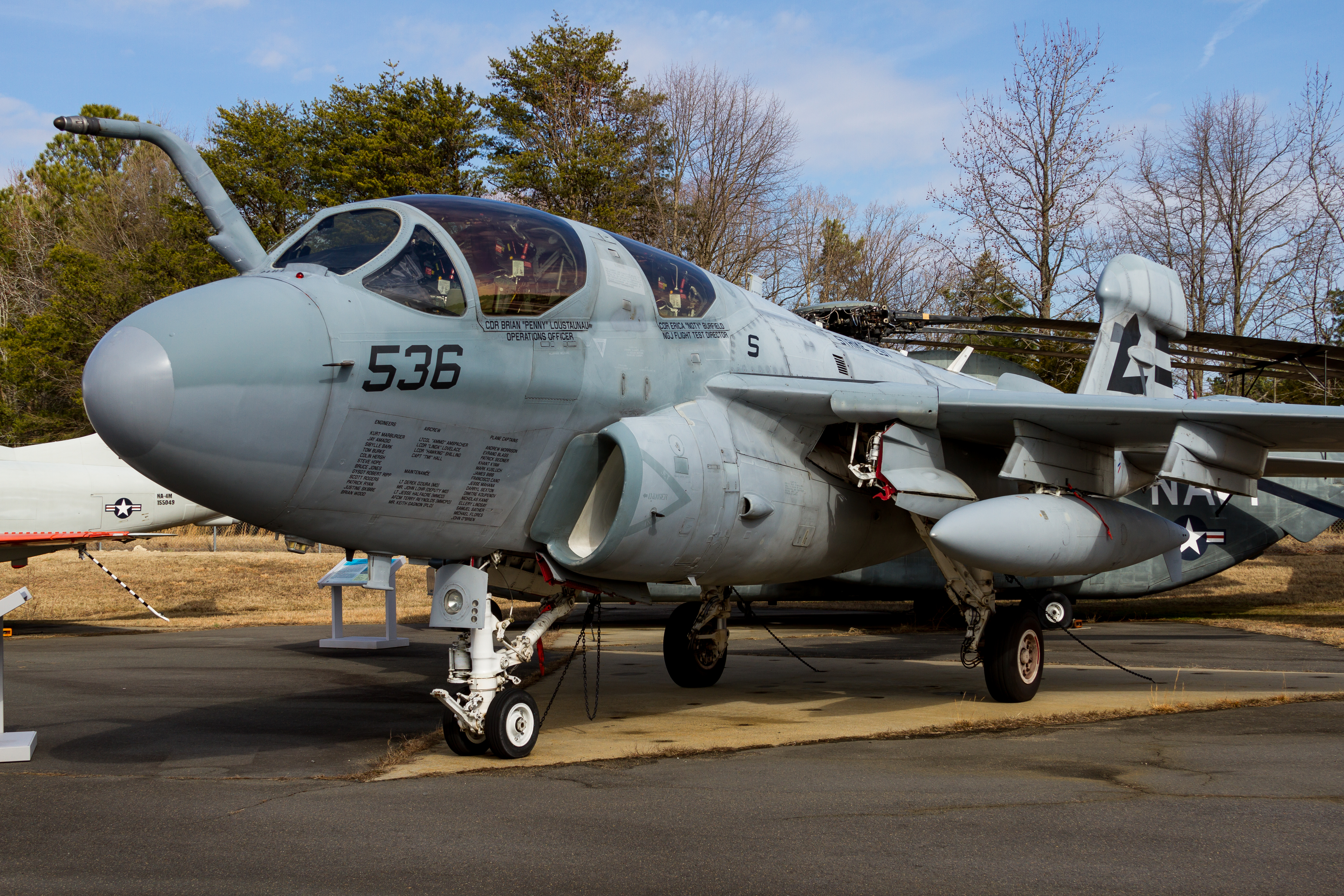
An EA-6B on display at the Patuxent River Naval Air Museum

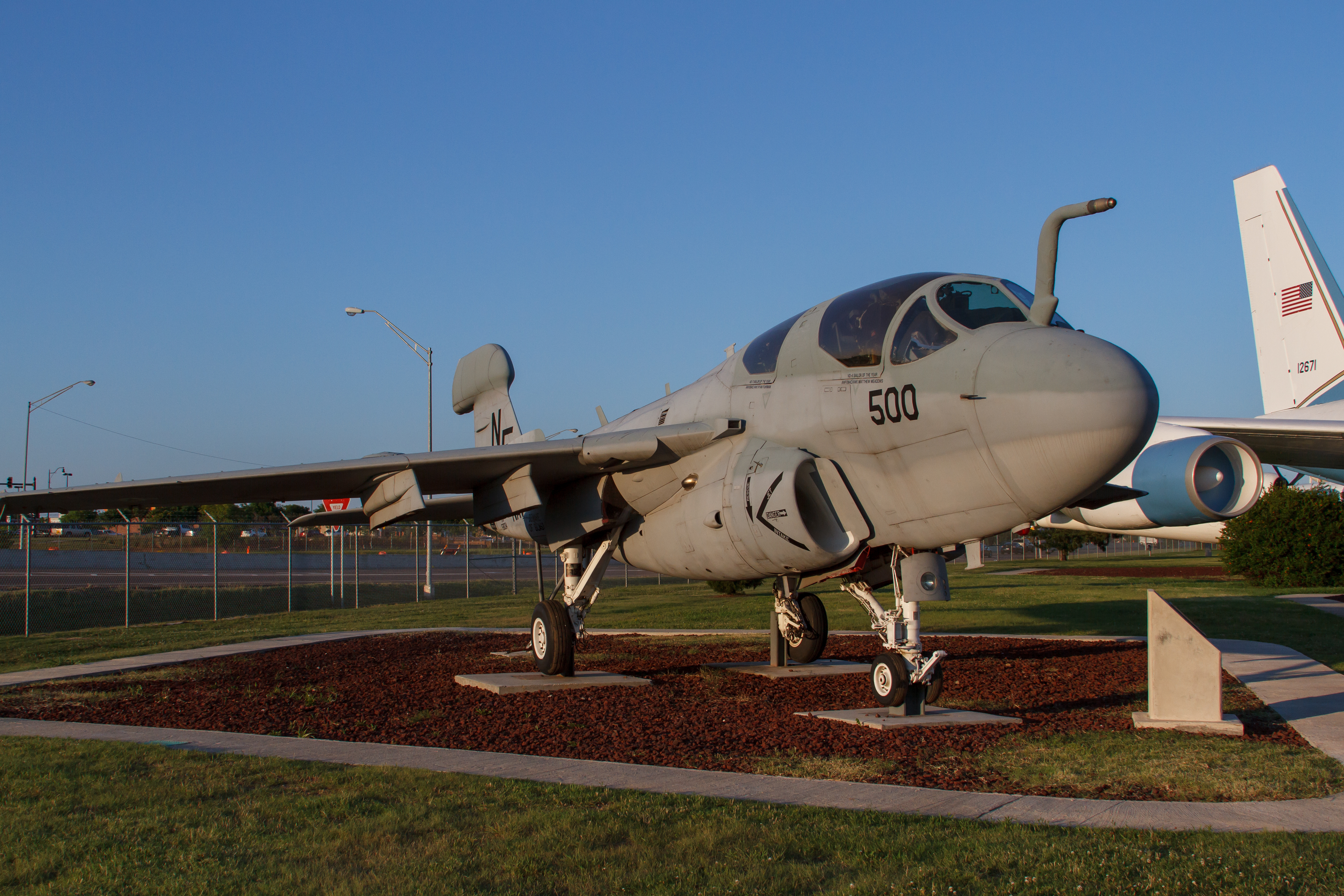
An EA-6B Prowler on display at Tinker AFB in Oklahoma City

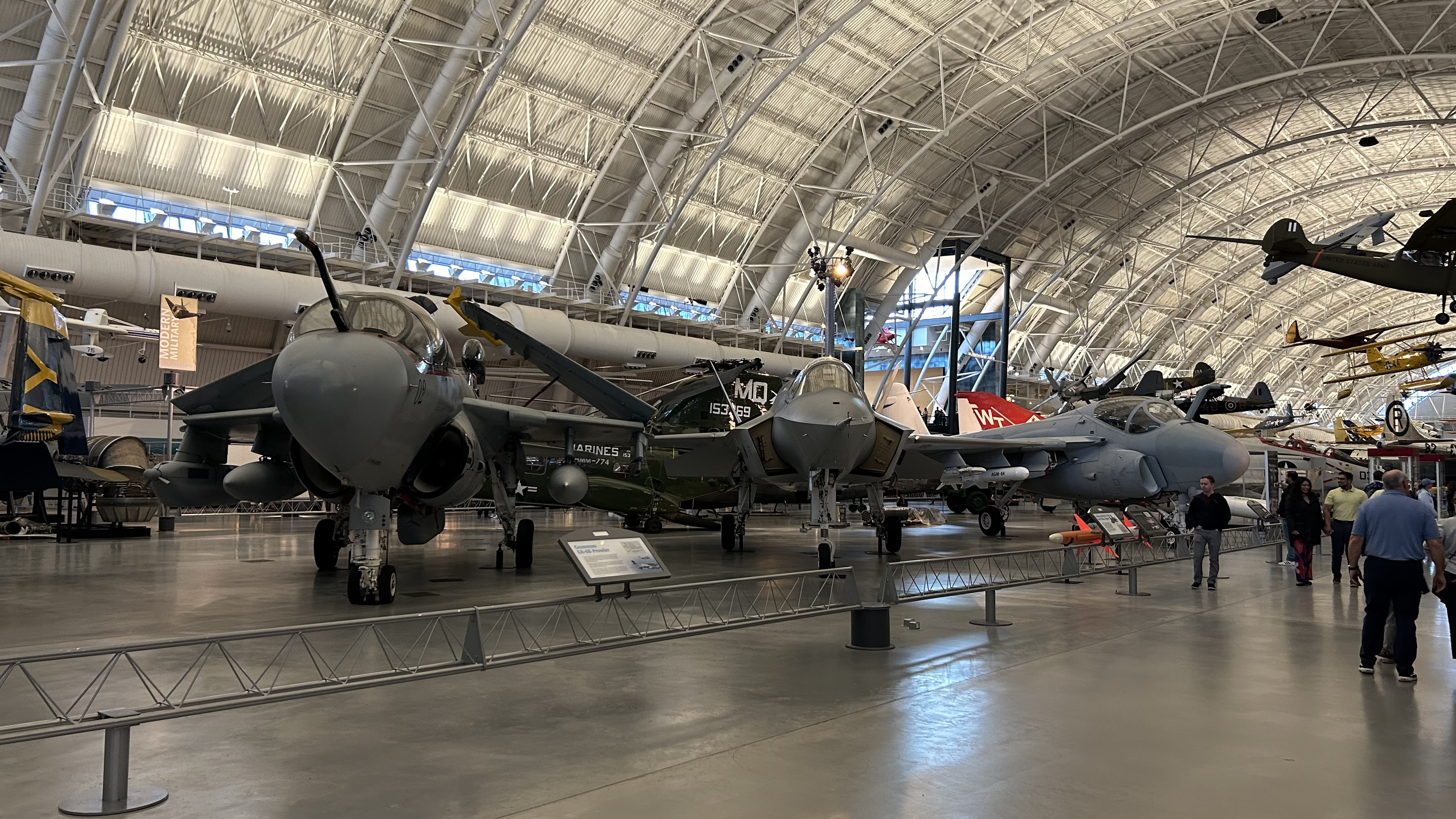
EA-6B Prowler 162230 (left) on display at the Steven F. Udvar-Hazy Center, alongside a Lockheed Martin X-35B & Grumman A-6E Intruder

- 147865 – EA-6A on static display at Marine Corps Air Station Cherry Point in Havelock, North Carolina.
- 148618 – EA-6A on static display at Naval Air Station Key West in Big Coppitt Key, Florida.
- 149475 – EA-6A on static display at the Wisconsin National Guard Memorial Library and Museum at Volk Field Air National Guard Base in Camp Douglas, Wisconsin.
- 156481 – EA-6B on static display at the National Naval Aviation Museum in Pensacola, Florida.
- 156478 – EA-6B on static display at Naval Air Station Whidbey Island in Oak Harbor, Washington.
- 156984 – EA-6A on static display at the Warner Museum of Aviation and Transportation in Sioux City, Iowa.
- 158029 – EA-6B on static display at Naval Air Station Patuxent River in Lexington Park, Maryland.
- 158033 – EA-6B on static display at Patuxent River Naval Air Museum in Lexington Park, Maryland.
- 158034 – EA-6B on static display at Charles B. Hall Airpark at Tinker Air Force Base in Oklahoma City, Oklahoma.
- 158036 – EA-6B on static display at Naval Air Station Whidbey Island in Oak Harbor, Washington.
- 158542 FrankenProwler – EA-6B on static display at the Pima Air & Space Museum in Tucson, Arizona. Three different ADVCAP airframes were assembled to create this one airframe.
- 158810 – EA-6B on static display at Naval Air Station Fallon in Fallon, Nevada.
- 158811 – EA-6B on static display at the Pacific Coast Air Museum in Santa Rosa, California.
- 160432 – EA-6B on static display at Marine Corps Air Station Cherry Point in Havelock, North Carolina.
- 160436 – EA-6B on static display at the Castle Air Museum in Atwater, California.
- 160609 – EA-6B on static display at Naval Air Station Jacksonville in Jacksonville, Florida.
- 161882 – EA-6B on static display at the March Field Air Museum in Riverside, California. Formerly on display at the Flying Leatherneck Aviation Museum in San Diego, California.
- 161884 – EA-6B on static display at the Museum of Flight in Seattle, Washington. It is on loan from the National Naval Aviation Museum at Pensacola, Florida.
- 162228 – EA-6B on static display at the Frontiers of Flight Museum at Dallas Love Field in Dallas, Texas. This aircraft along with 162230 participated in the decommissioning of VMAQ-2 in March, 2019.
- 162230 – EA-6B on static display at the Smithsonian Institution's Steven F. Udvar-Hazy Center in Chantilly, Virginia. This aircraft along with 162228 participated in the decommissioning of VMAQ-2 in March, 2019.
- 162935 – EA-6B on static display at the USS Midway Museum in San Diego, California.
- 162938 – EA-6B on static display at the American Airpower Museum in Farmingdale, New York.
- 163033 – EA-6B on static display at the Hickory Aviation Museum in Hickory, North Carolina. It flew to the museum from Marine Corps Air Station Cherry Point.
- 163047 – EA-6B on static display at the MAPS Air Museum in Canton, Ohio
- 163395 – EA-6B on static display at the United States Naval Academy in Annapolis, Maryland.
- 163886 – EA-6B on static display at the Wings Over the Rockies Air and Space Museum in Denver, Colorado.
- 163890 – EA-6B on static display at Naval Base Ventura County in Camarillo, California.
- 164401 – EA-6B on static display at Naval Support Activity Crane in Crane, Indiana.

== Specifications (EA-6B) ==
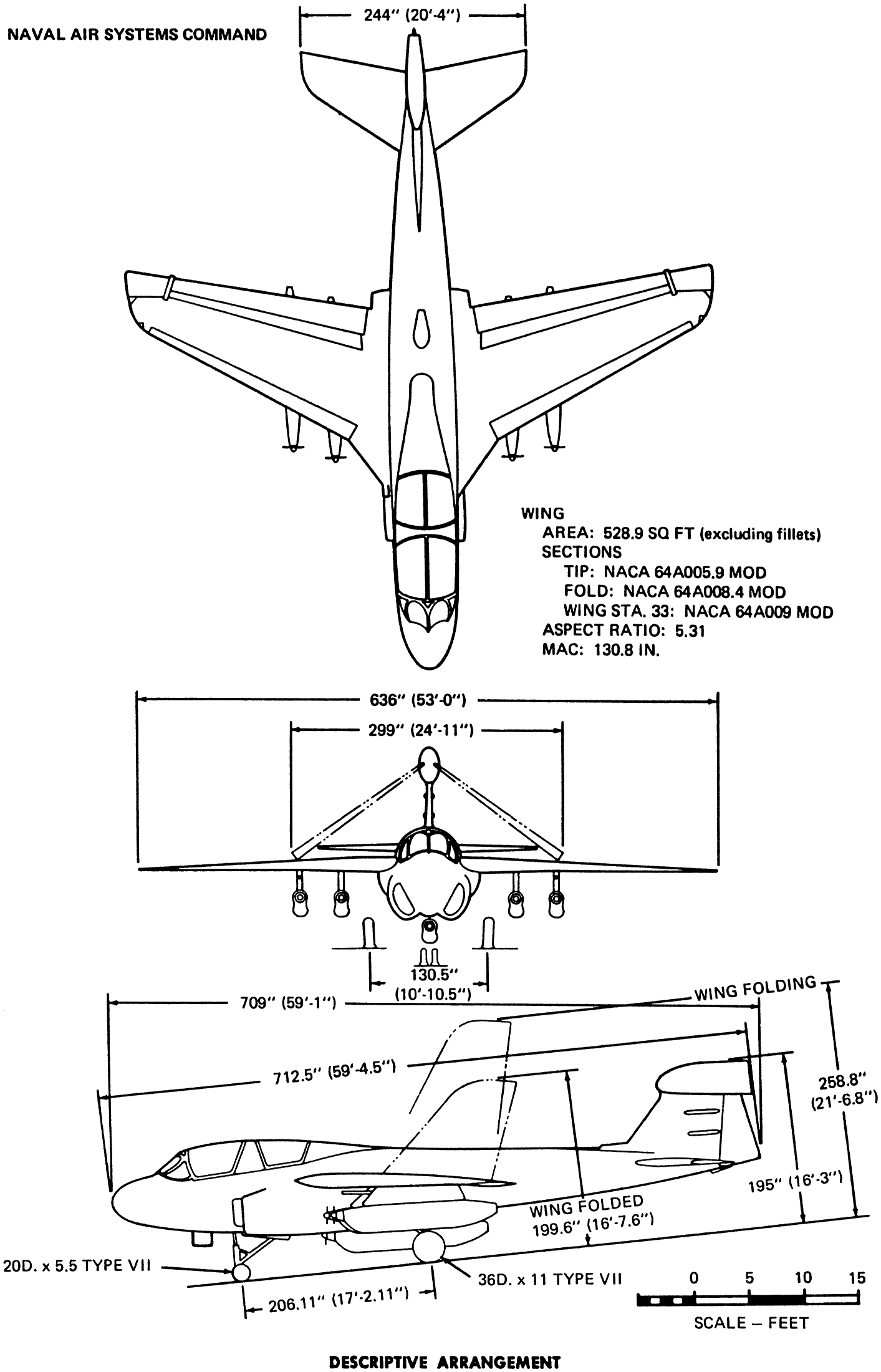
3-view line drawing of the Grumman EA-6B Prowler

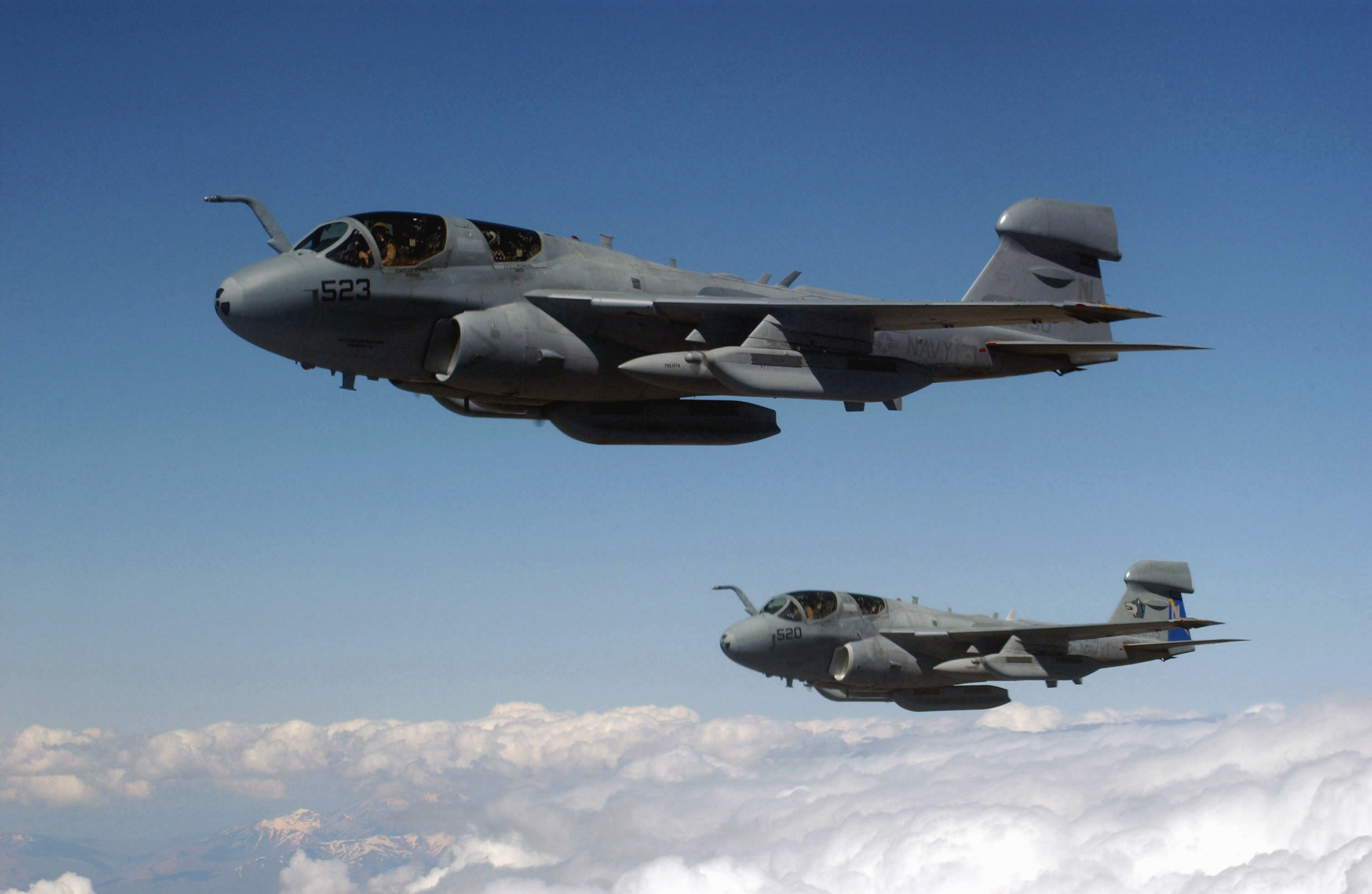
Two EA-6B Prowlers over Turkey flying in support of Operation Northern Watch, 2002.

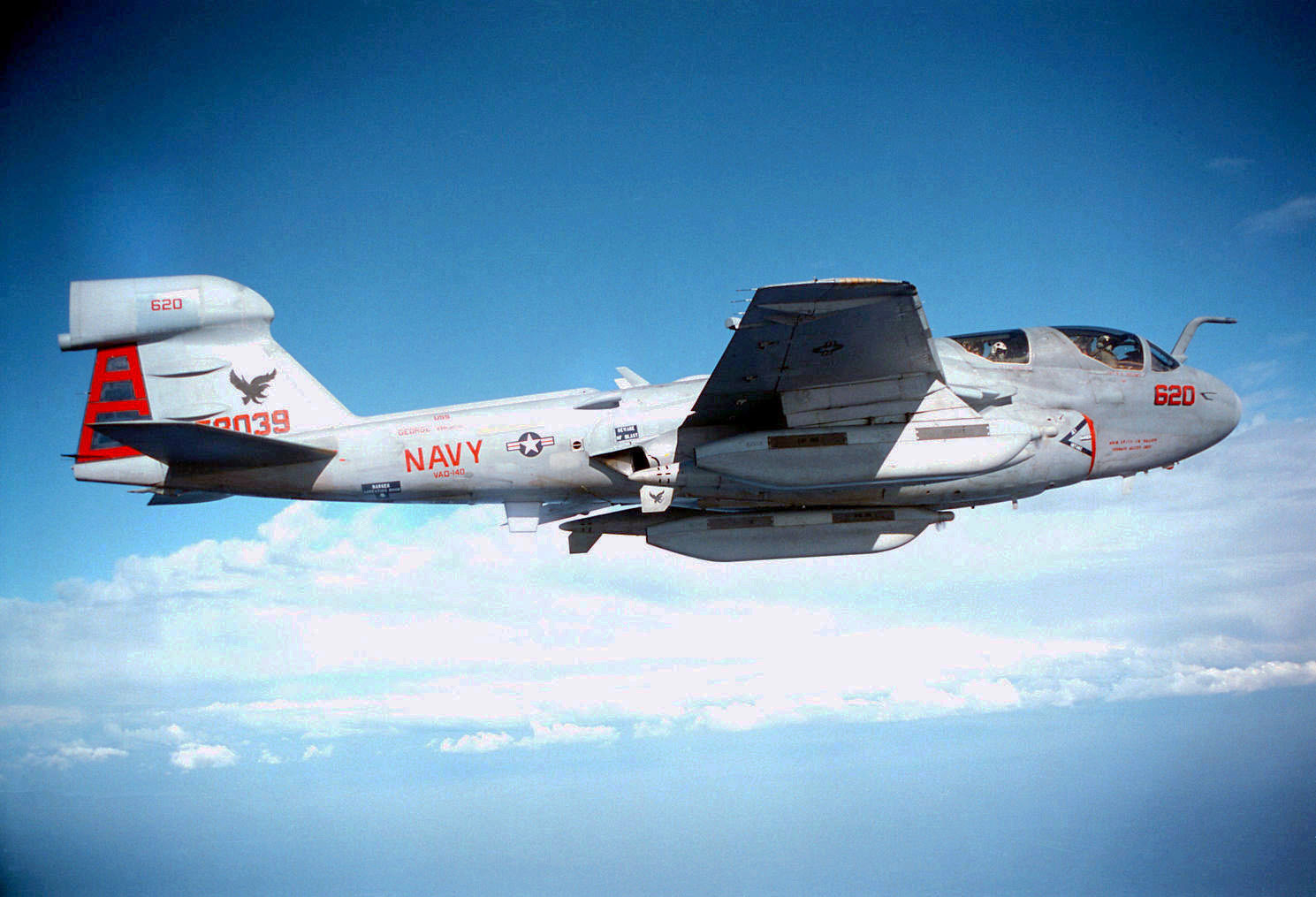
An EA-6B of VAQ-140 "Patriots" patrols the skies over Bosnia and Herzegovina, 1995.

Data from US Navy Fact File, US Navy history page

General characteristics

- Crew: four (one pilot, three electronic countermeasures officers)
- Length: 59 ft 10 in (18.24 m)
- Wingspan: 53 ft (16 m)
- Height: 16 ft 8 in (5.08 m)
- Wing area: 528.9 sq ft (49.14 m^{2})
- Empty weight: 31,160 lb (14,134 kg)
- Max takeoff weight: 61,500 lb (27,896 kg)
- Powerplant: 2 × Pratt & Whitney J52-P-408A turbojet engines, 10,400 lbf (46 kN) thrust each

Performance

- Maximum speed: 566 kn (651 mph, 1,048 km/h)
- Cruise speed: 418 kn (481 mph, 774 km/h)
- Range: 2,022 nmi (2,327 mi, 3,745 km) (tanks kept)

2,400 mi (2,100 nmi; 3,900 km) (tanks dropped)

- Service ceiling: 37,600 ft (11,500 m)
- Rate of climb: 12,900 ft/min (66 m/s)
- Wing loading: 116 lb/sq ft (570 kg/m^{2})
- Thrust/weight: 0.34

Armament

- Hardpoints: five total: one on the centerline/under-fuselage and four under-wing pylon stations with a capacity of 18,000 pounds (8,200 kg), with provisions to carry combinations of:
  - Missiles: Up to four AGM-88 HARM Anti-radiation missiles (typically two carried)
  - Other:
    - Up to five 300 US gallons (1,100 L) external drop tanks
    - Up to five AN/ALQ-99 Tactical Jamming System (TJS) external pods
    - AN/ALE-43(V)1&4 Bulk Chaff Dispensing System pod
    - AN/AAQ-28(V) Litening targeting pod (USMC only)

Avionics

- AN/ALQ-218 Tactical Jamming System Receiver
- AN/USQ-113 Communications Jamming System

== See also ==
Related development

- Grumman A-6 Intruder

Aircraft of comparable role, configuration, and era

- Boeing EA-18G Growler
- General Dynamics–Grumman EF-111A Raven

Related lists

- List of active United States military aircraft
- List of military electronics of the United States
