= VAQ-128 =

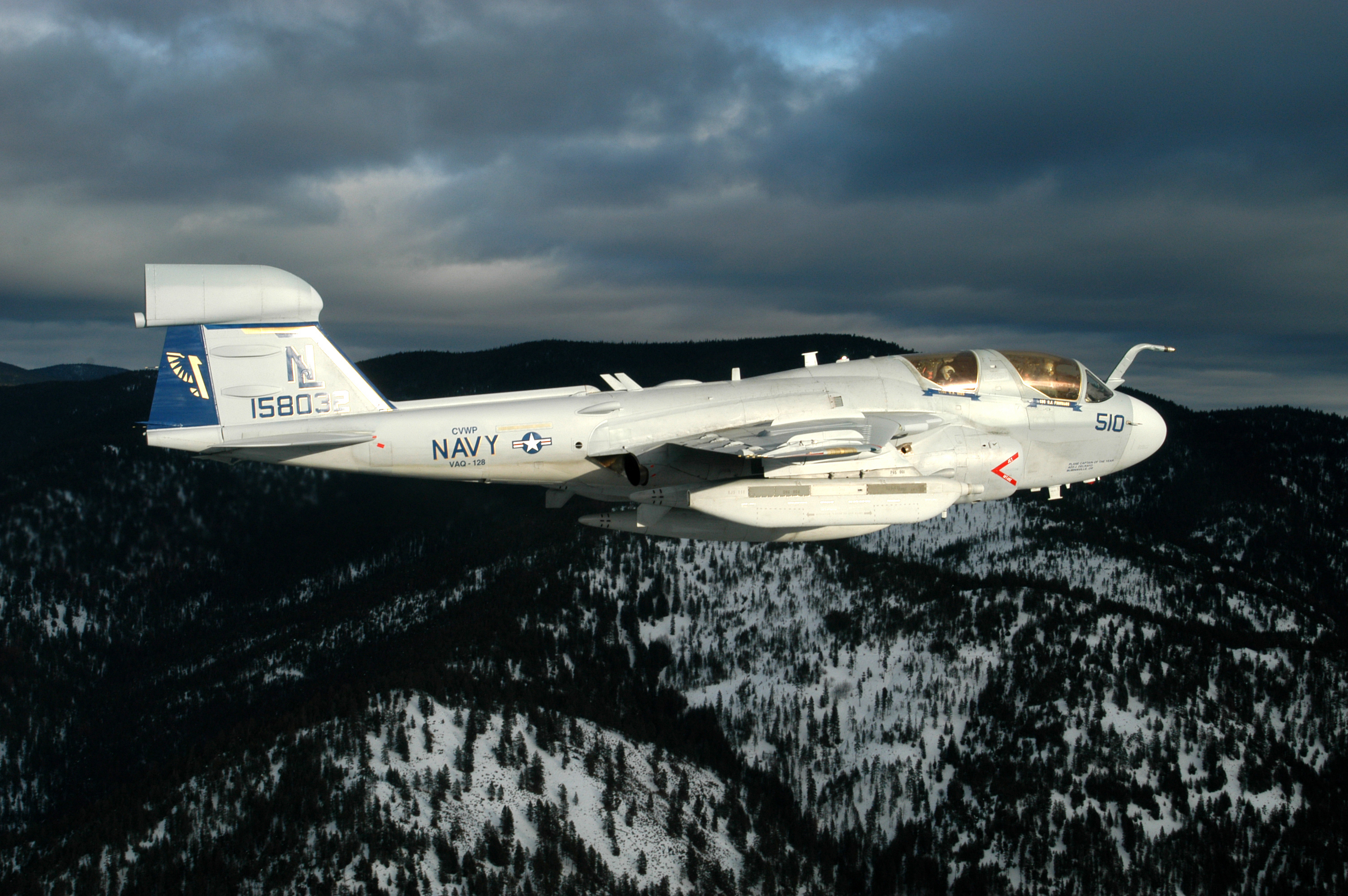
- VAQ-128 EA-6B in 2003
- Active: 9 October 1997 – September 2004
- Country: United States
- Branch: United States Navy
- Role: Electronic warfare aircraft
- Part of: Inactive
- Nickname(s): Fighting Phoenix

Aircraft flown
- Electronic warfare: EA-6B Prowler

VAQ-128, nicknamed the Fighting Phoenix, was an Electronic Attack Squadron of the United States Navy, based at NAS Whidbey Island, Washington. It was established on 9 October 1997 as an expeditionary EA-6B Prowler squadron to provide airborne radar jamming and deception support to Navy and Air Force units when the Air Force's EF-111A Raven was retired from service. The squadron included both Navy and Air Force personnel.

== Operational history ==
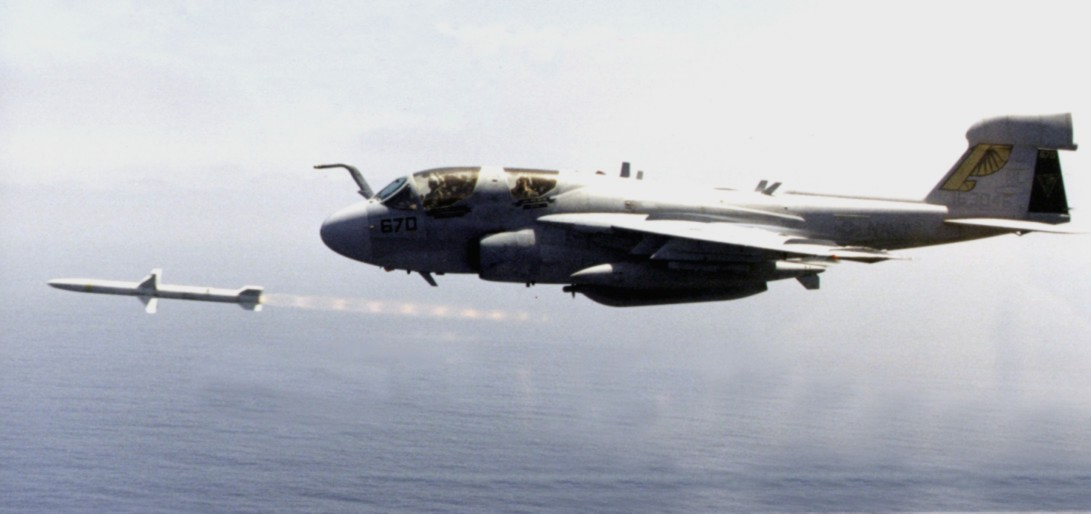
VAQ-128 EA-6B launches an AGM-88 HARM anti-radiation missile at NAS Point Mugu in 1999

Its deployments took VAQ-128 aircrews to Saudi Arabia, Turkey, Sicily and Japan in support of Operations Southern Watch, Desert Fox, Northern Watch and Iraqi Freedom. It returned from its final deployment in January 2004, and was deactivated in September of that year.

== See also ==
- History of the United States Navy
- List of inactive United States Navy aircraft squadrons
