= VMAQ-2 =

United States Marine Corps electronic warfare squadron

Marine Tactical Electronic Warfare Squadron 2
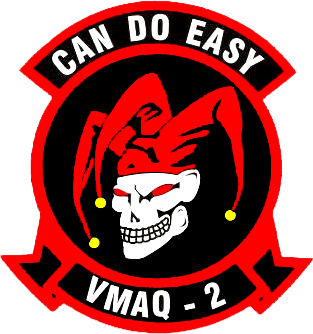
- Active: 15 September 1952 – 8 March 2019
- Country: United States
- Branch: United States Marine Corps
- Type: Airplane squadron
- Role: Attack and electronic warfare
- Garrison/HQ: Marine Corps Air Station Cherry Point
- Nicknames: "Death Jesters" "Panthers" (1993-2000) "Playboys" (1955-1993) "Widowmakers"
- Motto: "Can Do Easy"
- Tail code: CY
- Engagements: Vietnam War; Operation El Dorado Canyon; Persian Gulf War: Operation Desert Storm; Operation Decisive Endeavor; Operation Allied Force; Global War on Terrorism: War in Afghanistan; Iraq War; 2003 invasion of Iraq

Marine Tactical Electronic Warfare Squadron 2 (VMAQ-2) was a United States Marine Corps electronic warfare squadron in service from 1952 to 2019. It was the last squadron flying the Northrop Grumman EA-6B Prowler.

== Mission ==
Its mission was to support the Marine Air-Ground Task Force (MAGTF) commander by conducting airborne electronic warfare, day or night, under all weather conditions during expeditionary, joint, or combined operations. The squadron was based at Marine Corps Air Station Cherry Point, North Carolina and fell under the command of Marine Aircraft Group 14 (MAG-14) and the 2nd Marine Aircraft Wing (2nd MAW).

== History ==
VMAQ-2's predecessor squadrons flew various electronic warfare aircraft, including the AD-5 Skyraider, the EF-10 Skyknight, the RF-8 Crusader, the RF-4B Phantom II, and the EA-6A Intruder. VMC-2 was the original composite squadron (combined aerial photographic reconnaissance and electronic warfare capability) in Marine Corps aviation. It was commissioned at Marine Corps Air Station Cherry Point on 15 September 1952 evolving from the former Airborne Early Warning and Electronic Counter Measures section of the Wing Headquarters Squadron. On 1 December 1955, the squadron was redesignated as VMCJ-2 after former Marine Photographic Squadron 2 (VMJ-2) was decommissioned and joined VMC-2, and became VMCJ-2 (Marine Composite Jamming Squadron 1). As 1955 was also the year Playboy magazine was first published, it soon followed that the squadron adopted the Playboy name and logo with their permission. In 1962, VMCJ-2 provided electronic and photographic intelligence during the Cuban Missile Crisis that enabled President Kennedy to make key decisions that would lead to the removal of Soviet military equipment from Cuba. In 1964 VMCJ-2 participated in Operation Steel Pike, the largest amphibious training exercise in history. The unit sailed from Morehead City, NC to the Naval Base at Rota, Spain and flew both photographic and electronic warfare missions during the exercise.

=== Vietnam War ===
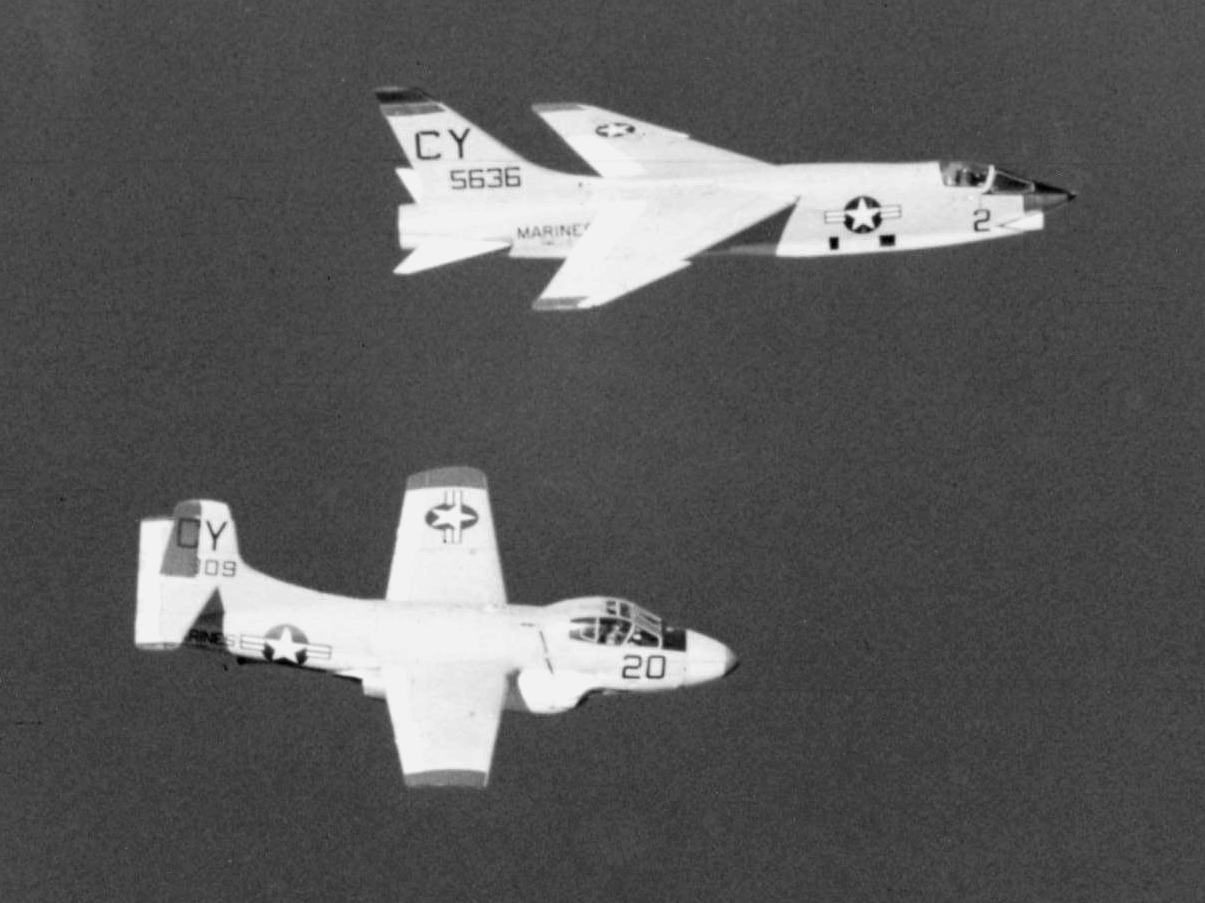
A F3D-2Q and a F8U-1P of VMCJ-2 in flight, circa 1958.

Less than three years after the end of the Cuban Missile Crisis, some of the same VMCJ-2 aircrews deployed with VMCJ-1 to Vietnam and applied their lessons learned against Cuba as the EF-10Bs began to provide ECM support for air strikes against North Vietnamese targets. Beginning in the Spring of 1966 the squadron began sending Marines to join VMCJ-1 in Vietnam for 13-month tours. In late November 1965, VMCJ-2 received the first EA-6A Electric Intruder. With the rapidly escalating North Vietnamese air defenses this new EW aircraft was anxiously awaited by VMCJ-1 still flying the outdated EF-10B Skyknights, However, the initial EW systems delivered with the new aircraft proved unsuitable for the mission without some major modifications. Given the urgency, the decision was made to make the modifications by a contractor team on-site at VMCJ-2. The success of this effort was due to the dedicated support of VMCJ-2 personnel who worked tirelessly to get the aircraft ready for deployment to Vietnam.

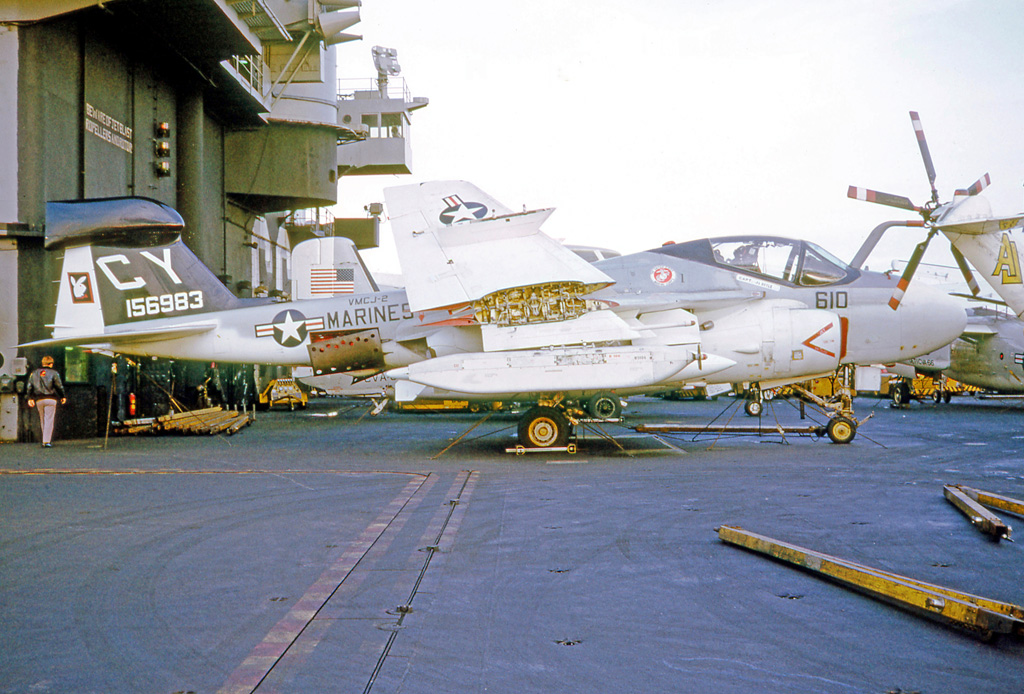
EA-6A Intruder of VMCJ-2 aboard USS America (CV-66) in September 1974 wearing the Playboy unit markings

During this same time period the squadron received the first of its RF-4Bs and for several months the squadron was flying four different aircraft types. In October, 1966 VMCJ-2 sent six EA-6As with full maintenance capability to Danang, Vietnam as a VMCJ-1 replacement cadre. The squadron would continue to provide replacement aircrews and updated aircraft to VMCJ-1 in Vietnam.

In 1971 the squadron deployed the first EA-6A detachment aboard USS Forrestal (CV-59) for a Mediterranean cruise that lasted 10 months with cross decking to USS Saratoga (CV-60) and USS America (CV-66). On 13 April 1972 the squadron diverted an EA-6A detachment that was scheduled to deploy on the Saratoga in the Mediterranean to WESTPAC to join VMCJ-1 at NAS Cubi Point. The VMCJ-2 detachment operated in concert with VMCJ-1 to support strikes against North Vietnam under Operation Linebacker that ended with the release of the U.S. POWs early in 1973.

=== Cold War Sea Service ===
==== 1970s ====
After its re-designation in 1975, VMAQ-2 deployed detachments of EA-6A Electric Intruder aircraft [designated Detachments Alpha, Bravo, and Charlie] and EA-6B Prowler aircraft [designated Detachments Xray, Yankee, and Zulu] on a continuous basis in support of Marine forces in the Western Pacific and in support of Fleet Commanders on aircraft carriers, including lengthy deployments on the Midway, Nimitz, America, and Saratoga. In 1977, the squadron transitioned to the EA-6B Prowler with the Improved Capability (ICAP) EW suite.

==== 1980s ====
On 26 May 1981, shortly before midnight, VMAQ-2, EA-6B Number 610 crashed while attempting to land on USS Nimitz. The aircraft struck several parked planes on the flight deck, killing 14 crew members and injuring more than 40 others. At the time of the incident, squadron detachment Y (Yankee) was assigned to Carrier Air Wing 8 (CVW-8) and was conducting training exercises 70 miles off the coast of Florida. After flight deck repairs in Norfolk, VA, the detachment continued to operate from Nimitz during a Mediterranean deployment of that same year.

In 1986, a detachment of the squadron participated in U.S. raids against Libya as part of Operation El Dorado Canyon.

=== The Persian Gulf War and Post-War Reorganization ===
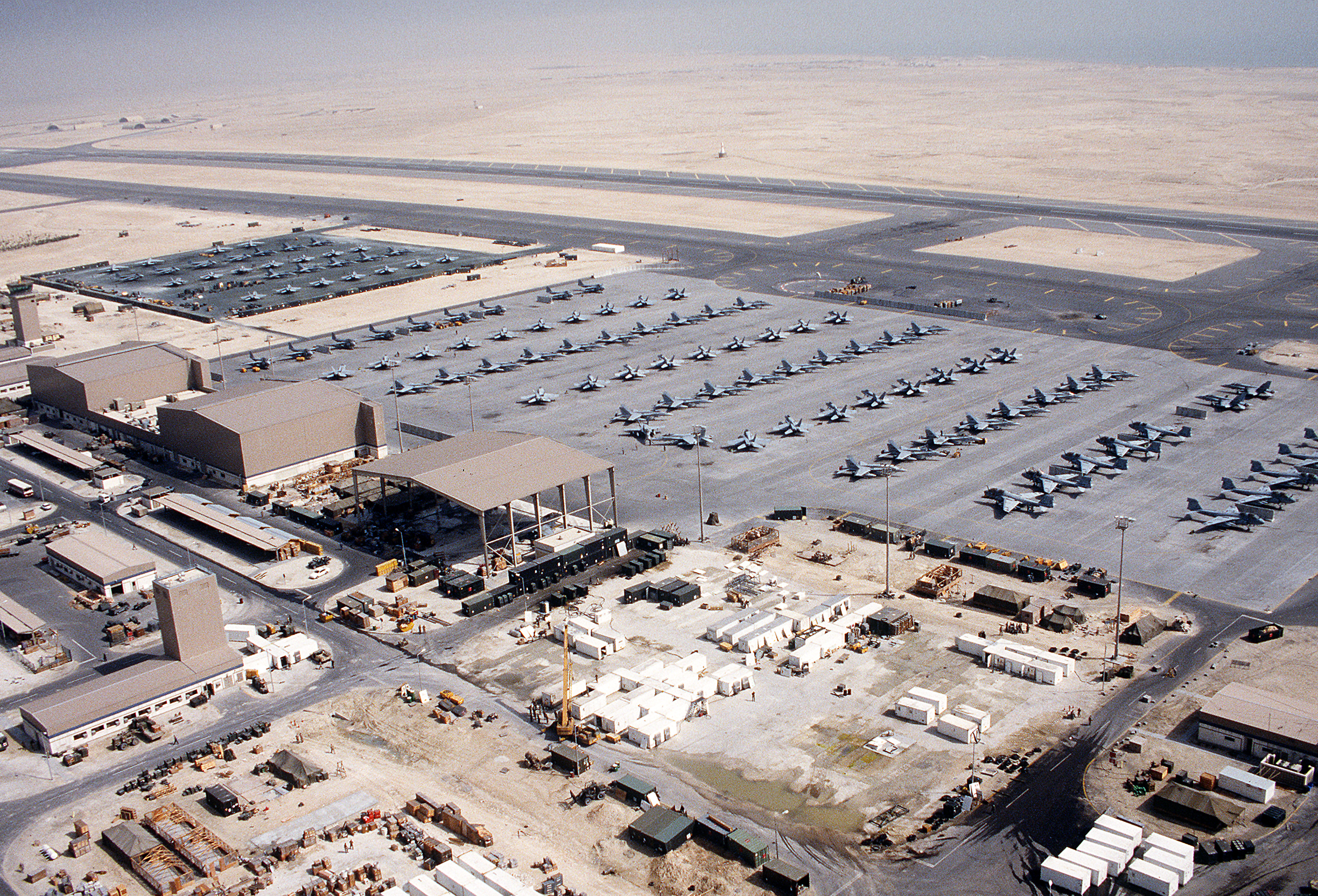
U.S. Marine Corps Marine Aircraft Group 11 aircraft at Shaikh Isa Air Base, in 1991.

In August 1990, VMAQ-2 deployed Detachments Yankee and Zulu to Shaikh Isa Air Base (ICAO: OBBS), in southern Bahrain in support of Operation Desert Shield and Operation Desert Storm, flying nearly 500 combat sorties in a six-week period. Detachment X-Ray was already forward deployed to MCAS Iwakuni (1st Marine Aircraft Wing) for their routine six-month WestPac tour but would end up remaining on deployment for a total of 410 days - more than double their scheduled time - the longest continuous deployment in Marine aviation history during peacetime.

On 1 July 1992, VMAQ-2, the largest tactical squadron in Marine Aviation, was reorganized into three squadrons: VMAQ-1 "Banshees", VMAQ-2 "Playboys", and VMAQ-3 "Moondogs". In 1993, outside pressure forced the Marine Corps to direct the squadron to change their name and logo from "Playboys" to something more politically correct. After several ideas were rejected the squadron chose "Panthers" as the new name and began using the logo (with permission) of the National Football League's Carolina Panthers. VMAQ-2 later changed from the "Panthers" to the current name "Death Jesters". Even with the name changes the squadron continues to use "Playboy" Bunny patches and paint jobs on their five aircraft. Even the CY tail code was fashioned on some in the shape of a bunny head (designed and implemented by VMAQ-2's MMCO at the time, Captain Ross Meglathery).

=== The Balkans ===
VMAQ-2’s next assignment led them to Aviano Air Base, Italy, in March 1996 in support of Operation Decisive Endeavor. This operation tasked VMAQ-2 with missions over Bosnia and Herzegovina. Specifically, VMAQ-2 Prowlers provided Suppression of Enemy Air Defenses (SEAD) support to British Harriers performing reconnaissance flights over weapons containment sites in these two areas of operation. In 1997, VMAQ-2 once again deployed to Aviano Air Base. However, this time it was in support of Operation Deliberate Guard. VMAQ-2 was tasked with flying missions over Bosnia to cover the Bosnian elections. On 3 February 1998 a USMC Grumman EA-6B Prowler, BuNo 163045, callsign "Easy 0-1" from VMAQ-2, struck a cable supporting a gondola in Cavalese, Italy. The cable was severed and 20 people in the cabin plunged over 80 metres to their deaths. The plane had wing and tail damage but was able to return to the base. It was the squadron's first major mishap in over 60,000 flight hours spanning nearly fifteen years of worldwide operations. In February 1999, VMAQ-1, VMAQ-2, VMAQ-3, and VMAQ-4 received the order to again deploy to Aviano Air Base in Italy in support of Operation Noble Anvil and possible subsequent combat operations against the Federal Republic of Yugoslavia. After diplomatic attempts to resolve the Kosovo crisis failed, Operation Allied Force began. VMAQ-2 launched day and night sorties to provide jamming and HARM support to U.S. and NATO missions. VMAQ-2 also provided support for armed reconnaissance missions, day and night battlefield air interdiction strikes, and combat search and rescue efforts of downed allied aircrew. When Operation Allied Force came to an end, VMAQ-2 had flown 2151.5 combat hours, 464 combat sorties, and fired 57 High speed Anti-Radiation Missiles (HARM) against the Federal Republic of Yugoslavia.

=== Global war on terrorism ===
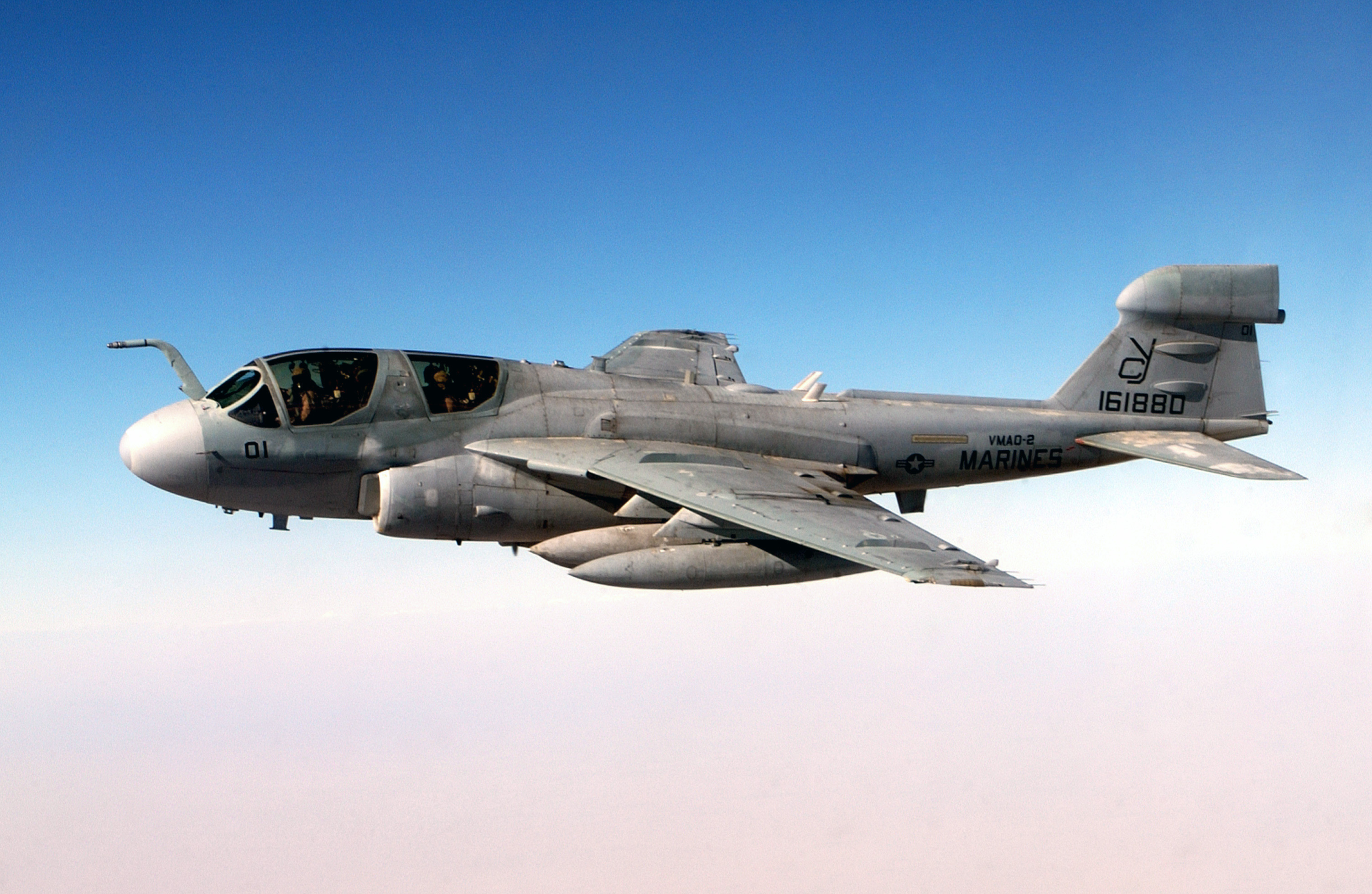
An EA-6B Prowler from VMAQ-2 over Iraq in 2004.

In February 2003, VMAQ-2 deployed to Prince Sultan Air Base, Saudi Arabia, initially in support of Operation ENDURING FREEDOM and then Operation IRAQI FREEDOM. VMAQ-2 logged over 1000 combat hours in under 60 days during the invasion of Iraq.

VMAQ-2 deployed to Tallil Air Base, Iraq, for Operation IRAQI FREEDOM II from July 2004 through January 2005 and became the first Prowler squadron to operate from Iraqi soil. The squadron logged over 2000 mishap-free combat hours and attained 10,000 mishap free flight hours during the same period. VMAQ-2 was subsequently chosen as the Marine Corps Aviation Association 2005 Prowler squadron of the year

In January 2006, VMAQ-2 deployed to Al Asad Airbase, Iraq in support of Operation IRAQI FREEDOM 05-07. VMAQ-2 flew 691 combat missions for 3286.7 combat flight hours and supported 975 Joint Tactical Air Requests (JTARS). This rigorous operational tempo resulted in four times the normal airframe utilization rate.

In July 2007, VMAQ-2 returned to Al Asad, Iraq in support of Operation IRAQI FREEDOM 06-08. During the deployment, VMAQ-2 flew 821 combat missions for a total of 4423.0 combat flight hours while supporting Coalition ground forces. This sustained tempo led not only to the highest utilization rate for any Prowler squadron but also for any Type/Model/Series in the Marine Corps.

On May 19, 2010, VMAQ-2 Marines deployed to Camp McCool had to repel a Taliban attack in which two of the Marines who were involved in the firefight were injured.

In November 2018, VMAQ-2 returned from its final deployment and the final deployment of any USMC Prowler squadron. The squadron was decommissioned on 8 March 2019.

== Awards ==
VMAQ-2’s awards include the Navy Unit Commendation Streamer with two Bronze Stars for the Cuban Missile Crisis and actions against Iraq, the Meritorious Unit Commendation Streamer with two Bronze Stars, the Marine Corps Expeditionary Streamer with two Bronze Stars, the National Defense Service Streamer with two Bronze Stars, the Armed Forces Expeditionary Streamer with one Bronze Star for Cuban and Dominican Republic service, and the Southwest Asia Service Streamer with two Bronze Stars.

== Gallery ==
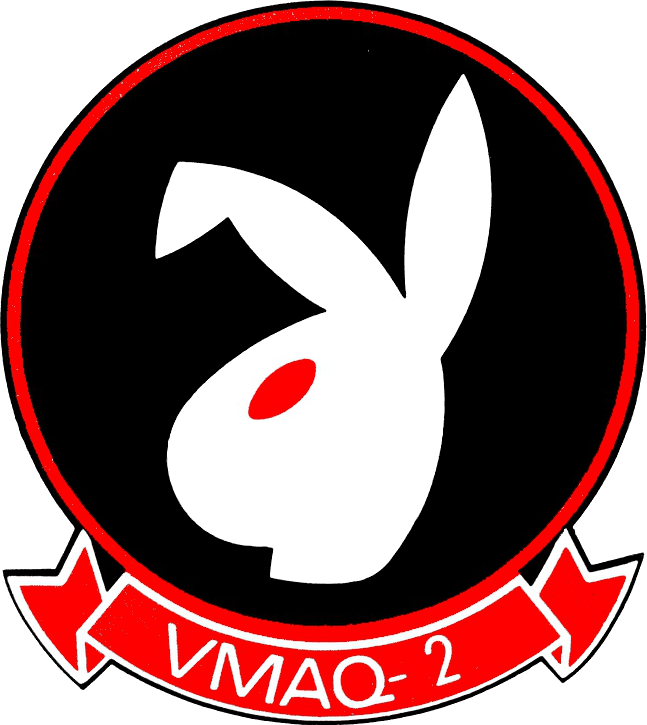
Squadron insignia from 1977

== See also ==
- United States Marine Corps Aviation
- List of United States Marine Corps aircraft squadrons
- List of decommissioned United States Marine Corps aircraft squadrons
