= List of Royal Air Force operations =

This following list of Royal Air Force operations includes both national and multi-national operations, as well as joint and air-only operations that the Royal Air Force has participated in.

== Current ==
Name	From	To	Location	Notes
Aluminium	2022, February	Present	Poland & Romania	UK contribution to NATO's response to the Russian invasion of Ukraine.
Azotize	2023, March	Present	Lithuania & Estonia	UK contribution to NATO's Baltic Air Policing mission.
Biloxi	2017, April	Present	Romania	UK contribution to NATO's Southern Air Policing mission.
Broadshare	2020, January	Present	British Overseas Territories & overseas military bases	Military assistance to tackle the COVID-19 pandemic overseas.
Kipion	2011, June	Present	Oman, UAE, Qatar	UK air presence in the Persian Gulf & Indian Ocean.
Shader	2014, 26 September	Present	Iraq & Syria, operating from RAF Akrotiri	Providing humanitarian aid airdrops, reconnaissance and airstrikes as part of the military intervention against ISIL.

== Previous ==
Name	From	To	Location	Notes
Accolade			Rhodes	Cancelled, part of the Dodecanese campaign, World War II.
Banner	1969, August	2007, July	Northern Ireland	Military support to the Royal Ulster Constabulary/Police Service of Northern Ireland
Bolton	1998	2003	Southern Iraq	Part of Operation Southern Watch
Boomster	2018, March	2018, March	United Kingdom	Military Aid following extreme weather conditions
Bushell	1984, November	1985, December	Ethiopia	Famine relief
Chocolate	12 November 1942	13 November 1942		Part of the Western Desert Campaign, World War II.
Coral	2003, 14 June	2003, 10 September	Democratic Republic of Congo	Humanitarian operation in the Democratic Republic of Congo
Corporate	2 April 1982	14 June 1982	Falkland Islands	Part of the Falklands War
Decisive Edge	January 1996	December 1996	Bosnia and Herzegovina; Croatia	Part of the NATO intervention in Bosnia and Herzegovina.
Deliberate Force	30 August 1995	14 September 1995	Bosnia and Herzegovina; Croatia	Part of the NATO intervention in Bosnia and Herzegovina.
Deliberate Guard	December 1996	April 1998	Bosnia and Herzegovina; Croatia	Part of the NATO intervention in Bosnia and Herzegovina. Formerly Op Decisive Edge.
Deny Flight	12 April 1993	20 December 1995	Bosnia and Herzegovina; Croatia	Part of the NATO intervention in Bosnia and Herzegovina.
Ellamy	19 March 2011	31 October 2011	Libya	Part of the 2011 military intervention in Libya
Engadine	1999	1999	Kosovo	Part of NATO operations in Kosovo
Fingal	1 January 2002	2002	Afghanistan & Asia	Part of the War in Afghanistan (2001–2021)
Fresco	2002	2003	United Kingdom	Military support during the UK firefighters' dispute
Granby	1 October 1990	March 1991	Iraq & Asia	Part of the Gulf War
Gritrock	30 October 2014	13 November 2015	West Africa	UK military contribution to the Ebola virus epidemic in West Africa
Herrick	20 June 2002	12 December 2014	Afghanistan & Asia	Part of the War in Afghanistan (2001–2021)
Highbrow	2006	2006	Lebanon via Cyprus	UK military support to evacuation operation from Beirut.
Jural	1992	1998	Southern Iraq	Part of Operation Southern Watch
Khana Cascade	March 1973	March 1973	Nepal	Airlift to villagers.
Luminous	August 2013	November 2013	Cyprus	Protection of UK Sovereign Base Areas
Masterer	November 2019	December 2019	Iceland	UK contribution to NATO's Icelandic Air Policing Mission
Maturin	October 2005	January 2006	Pakistan and Kashmir	UK military contribution to humanitarian operations following earthquake.
Microbe	13 September 1943	22 November 1943	Rhodes	Part of the Dodecanese campaign, World War II.
Newcombe	13 January 2013	14 November 2022	West Africa	Operation Newcombe was the code name for two separate and concurrent RAF non-combat military operations in Mali. One operation involved logistical and airlift support for the French-led Operation Barkhane (previously Operation Serval), whilst the other encompassed peacekeeping in support of the United Nations Multidimensional Integrated Stabilization Mission in Mali (MINUSMA).
Palliser	May 2000	September 2000	Sierra Leone	UK military intervention in Sierra Leone
Pitting	13 August 2021	28 August 2021	Afghanistan	Evacuating British nationals and eligible Afghans from Afghanistan following the 2021 Taliban offensive.
Plainfare	24 June 1948	12 May 1949	Allied-occupied Germany	Part of the Cold War.
Rescript	23 March 2020	2022	United Kingdom	Homeland military operation to support tackling the COVID-19 pandemic.
Resinate	2001	2003	Iraq	Maintaining no-fly zones in Iraq.
River	27 May 1944			Part of World War II.
Ruman	September 2017	October 2017	Caribbean	Providing relief to the British Overseas Territories in the Caribbean affected by Hurricane Irma.
Shaku	December 2016	December 2016	Northern England	Repairing flood defences during the 2015–16 Great Britain and Ireland floods.
Stamina	July 1944			Part of World War II
Telic	19 March 2003	22 May 2011	Iraq & Asia	Part of the Iraq War
Thursday	5 March 1944		Burma	Part of the Burma Campaign, World War II
Toral	2015	8 July 2021	Afghanistan	UK's contribution to NATO's Resolute Support Mission
Trenton	2017	2020	South Sudan	British contribution to the United Nations Mission in South Sudan (UNMISS).
Turus	April 2014	April 2024	Nigeria	Training and supporting the Nigerian Armed Forces to help it counter violent extremists.
Veritas	2001	20 June 2002	Afghanistan & Asia	Part of Operation Enduring Freedom - Afghanistan
Vigour	12 December 1992	12 December 1992	Kenya	Relief flights.
Warden	September 1991	1991	Iraq	
Wildhorn	1944	1994	Poland	Part of the World War II.
