= Marine Aircraft Group 15 =

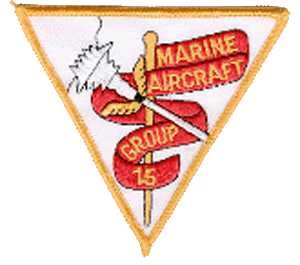
- MAG-15 insignia
- Active: 1 March 1942 – 31 December 1988
- Country: United States
- Allegiance: United States of America
- Branch: United States Marine Corps
- Part of: Marine Air, West Coast
- Engagements: World War II; Vietnam War

Commanders
- Notable commanders: Robert P. Keller

Marine Aircraft Group 15 (MAG-15) was a United States Marine Corps aviation group established during World War II. MAG-15, a transport and photo-reconnaissance training group, was commissioned on 1 March 1942, headquartered at Camp Kearny, San Diego. In addition to radio and photographic training, the Group also conducted a navigation school. Additional roles included West Coast aircraft acceptance and transport service for the Marine Corps.

== History ==
=== World War II ===
Marine Aircraft Group 15 was commissioned on 1 March 1942 at Camp Kearny, San Diego, California. For the next two years the group remained there as the transportation, observation and photo reconnaissance training group. They trained pilots and crews to serve in the South Pacific Combat Air Transport Command (SCAT). From its commission in 1942 until 1944, MAG-15 trained and dispatched the following unit for overseas deployment: VMD-154 and VMD-254; VMO-151 and VMO-155; and VMJ-152, VMJ-153, VMJ-353, VMJ-952, and VMJ-953.

MAG-15 shipped out from Camp Kearny to the South Pacific on 2 March 1944. They arrived in Apamama on 1 April and operated from there as part of the Transport Air Group until October 1944. In October they were ordered to establish the Air Transport Group (ATG) in order to provide transportation services to units in the Marshall and Gilbert Islands. ATG was redesignated the Troop Carrier Group (TCG) in November 1944. MAG-15 then became part of Task Unit 96.1 which was disbanded shortly thereafter on 25 March 1945 as its responsibilities were assumed by the NATS.

Headquarters Squadron 15 was sent to Marine Corps Air Station Ewa, Hawaii in April 1945 and was quickly joined by VMR-953 and VMR-352. They stayed there through the end of the war becoming part of the TAG again and controlling the transportation units for the Marines throughout the Pacific.

In January 1947 the group became dual roled when they also had fighter squadrons attach and in May 1947 they became all fighter squadrons. In March 1949 they returned to the United States and were based at Marine Corps Air Station Edenton, North Carolina.

=== Vietnam War ===
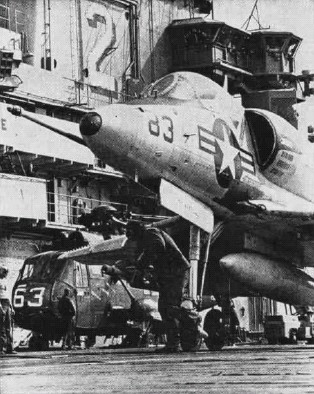
An A-4C of H&MS-15 Det. N on the USS Hornet in 1965/66

MAG-15 moved to Marine Corps Air Station Iwakuni in July 1966 and included VMCJ-1, VMA(AW)-533, VMFA-334 and VMFA-232.

On 6 April 1972 Marine Aircraft Group 15 (MAG-15) received orders from 1st Marine Aircraft Wing. They were to move the air group to Da Nang Air Base, South Vietnam. On 9 April 1972, the first aircraft touched down at Da Nang. Missions were flown in support of South Vietnam's military after the 30 March 1972 North Vietnamese Easter Offensive.

On 20 June 1972 MAG-15 was ordered to move to Royal Thai Air Base Nam Phong, Thailand, aka MCAS Rose Garden.

MAG-15 in June 1972 consisted of four combat aircraft squadrons. VMFA-115 F-4B Phantoms, VMFA-232 F-4J Phantoms and All-weather attack squadron VMA(AW)-533 A6A Intruders. Air to air refueling was performed by VMGR-152 KC-130's. Search and rescue was performed by H&MS-36 CH-46 Sea Knight's.

Task Force Delta's MAG-15 was supported by units from FMFPAC including the U.S. Navy SeaBee's 5th Mobile Construction Battalion (MCB 5), US Navy Medical Corps and 3rd Force Service Regiment, 3rd Marine Division on Okinawa.

MAG-15 during 1972–73, under the umbrella of the 7th Air Force, participated in Operations Linebacker, Linebacker II and after the 1973 cease-fire in Vietnam, Cambodia. MAG-15 provided direct support to the government of Cambodia until 15 August 1973.

=== Stand down ===
On 31 December 1988, MAG-15 stood down after 46 years of service.

== Notable commanders ==
- Peter Pace, former Chairman of the Joint Chiefs of Staff served as executive officer of the Security Element, 1972–1973.
- Robert G. Owens Jr., former Commanding general, 1st Marine Aircraft Wing, served as Group's operations officer in 1953-1954.

== See also ==
- List of United States Marine Corps aircraft groups
