= SOPAC =

SOPAC may refer to:

- South Pacific Applied Geoscience Commission
- South Pacific Combat Air Transport Command
- South Pacific Area
- Southern Pacific Railroad
- Sydney Olympic Park Aquatic Centre
