= 152 Squadron =

152 Squadron or 152nd Squadron may refer to:

- No. 152 Squadron RAF, a unit of the United Kingdom Royal Air Force
- Marine Aerial Refueler Transport Squadron 152, a unit of the United States Marine Corps
