= Royal Thai Air Base Nam Phong =

Nam Phong Royal Thai Air Force Base
- Part of Royal Thai Air Force (RTAF)
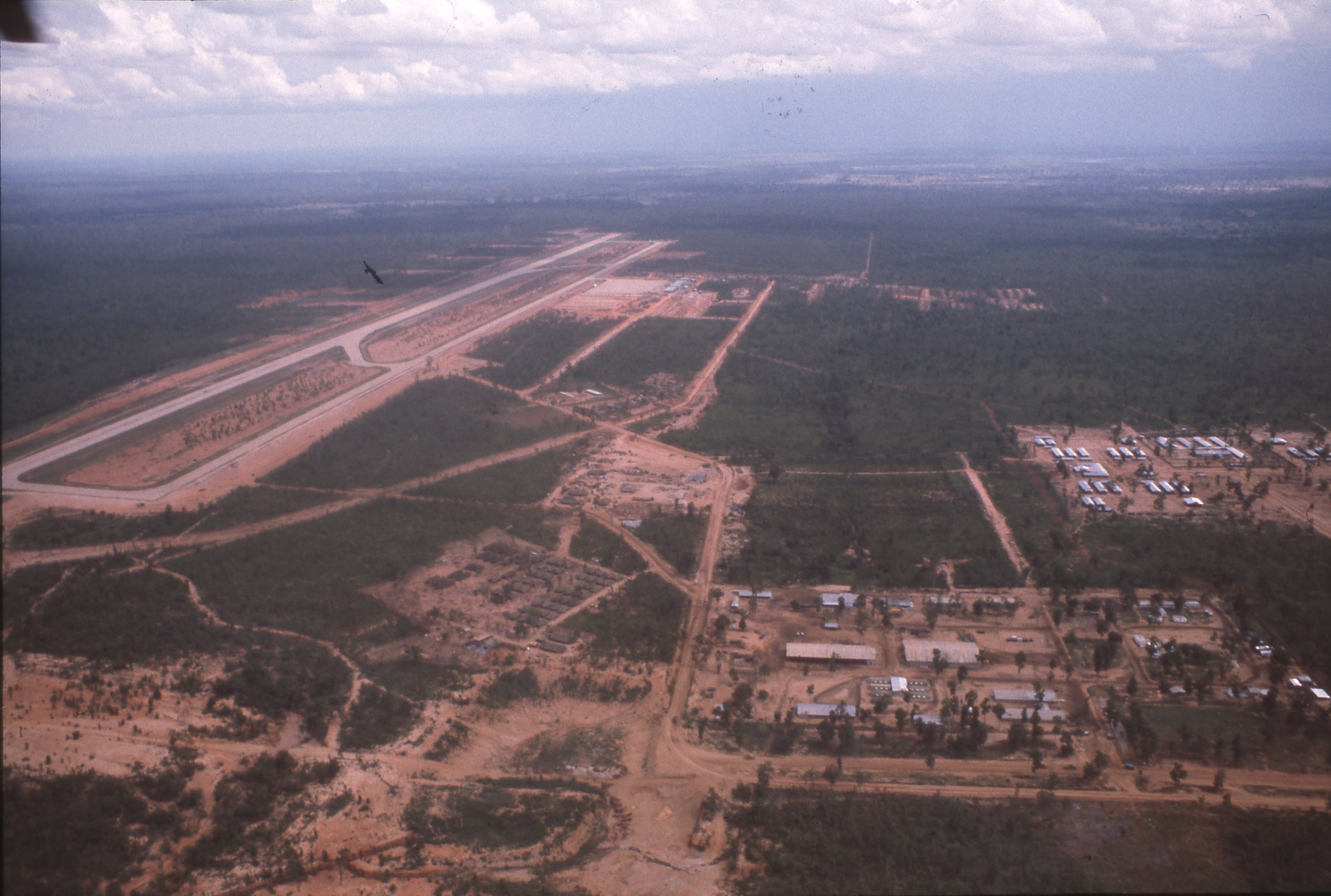
- Nam Phong in June 1972

Site information
- Type: Air Force Base
- Condition: Military Air Force Base

Location
- Coordinates: 16°39′06″N 102°57′56″E

Site history
- Battles/wars: Vietnam War

Garrison information
- Occupants: Marine Aircraft Group 15

Airfield information
- IATA: none; ICAO: VTUZ

Summary
- Elevation AMSL: 750 ft (230 m)
- Coordinates: 16°39′06″N 102°57′56″E

Map
- Location of Nam Phong Royal Thai Air Force Base

Runways
Direction	Length		Surface
Direction	ft	m	Surface
01/19	9,843 x 200	3,000	Concrete

The Royal Thai Air Base Nam Phong in Nam Phong District, Khon Kaen Province, Thailand was constructed in 1966-1967 during the Vietnam War by Utah Mining Company, originally to support EC-121 aircraft and potentially three tactical aircraft squadrons, but was ultimately completed as a "bare base" to support disbursal and theater force staging. The airfield was used by covert Laotian and Thai Special Operations Forces as part of Project 404 (aka-Palace Dog) and Project Unity from 1969 through 1975. In June 1972 Nam Phong became a concurrent base of operations for United States Marine Corps air operations by Marine Aircraft Group 15, 1st Marine Aircraft Wing.

Elements of squadrons that had previously been located at Da Nang Air Base, South Vietnam were moved to Nam Phong starting in June 1972 to support air operations to counter the Easter Offensive. The advance party that first arrived landed to find basically an airfield in the middle of the jungle. At that time the base consisted of a runway, parking apron, and a few wooden buildings. A United States Navy Seabee battalion (MCB 5) was soon clearing the jungle and some 10 man tents were hastily erected to sleep and work in. Since the conditions were rugged, the base soon came to be called "The Rose Garden" after the song by Lynn Anderson and the Marine recruiting campaign based on it, saying "We never promised you a rose garden" and depicting a Marine drill instructor addressing a terrified recruit.

The squadrons in residence soon included H&MS-15, MABS-15, VMFA-115 and VMFA-232 with F-4 Phantom IIs, VMA(AW)-533 with A-6 Intruders, VMGR-152 with KC-130 Hercules, and H&MS-36, Det "D" with CH-46 Sea Knights.

These were soon joined by 3rd Battalion 9th Marines. who served as the security element. Marine Air Traffic Control Unit 62 (MATCU 62) handled the airport traffic control operations, including the airport tower and GCA radar (Ground Controlled Approach). The military occupying "The Rose Garden" was designated Task Force Delta. The base included Marines, Navy medical and construction staff, some airmen (mostly cargo handers), and a six-man United States Army detachment from the 11th Signal Brigade (United States), which provided specialized communications security to the command from June to December 1972. There were also Thai military elements. The Rose Garden was active until September 1973, when all US military units returned to their home bases.

During its operational occupation by U.S. forces, Nam Phong was used for air operations against targets in North Vietnam, Cambodia and Laos. During this time, a small contingent of Marines remained in Da Nang to serve as a "turn around crew" It was their job to refuel and re-arm Marine aircraft for a second sortie to the North before returning to Nam Phong. This allowed the Marines to make two sorties per day per plane. Nam Phong was also a primary divert airbase for battle damaged aircraft and those low on fuel.

In May 1975 Nam Phong also received refugee flights evacuating Hmong from Long Tieng, Laos.

Nam Phong has been a Royal Thai Air Force (RTAF) communications center. An on-site visit in January 2019 by several Marine veterans of Task Force Delta report that the base was minimally staffed and the runway surface is in poor condition and would not support non-emergency fixed-wing aircraft use.

In early April 2022, The Bangkok Post reported that due to noise complaints from residents near Udorn Royal Thai Air Force Base, the RTAF had decided to relocate jet training from there to Nam Phong, with the move scheduled to occur in late 2025 after the base facilities had been improved. Google Maps and Google Earth images dated Feb 2021 show the runway has been resurfaced and a few additional structures have been constructed.

== See also ==
- List of United States Marine Corps aircraft squadrons
