= 13th Troop Carrier Squadron (disambiguation) =

13th Troop Carrier Squadron may refer to:

- The 913th Air Refueling Squadron, designated the 13th Troop Carrier Squadron from July 1942 to October 1946.
- The 13th Reconnaissance Squadron, designated the 13th Troop Carrier Squadron, Medium from June 1952 to April 1953.
