= Marine Aircraft Group 25 =

Marine Air Group 25
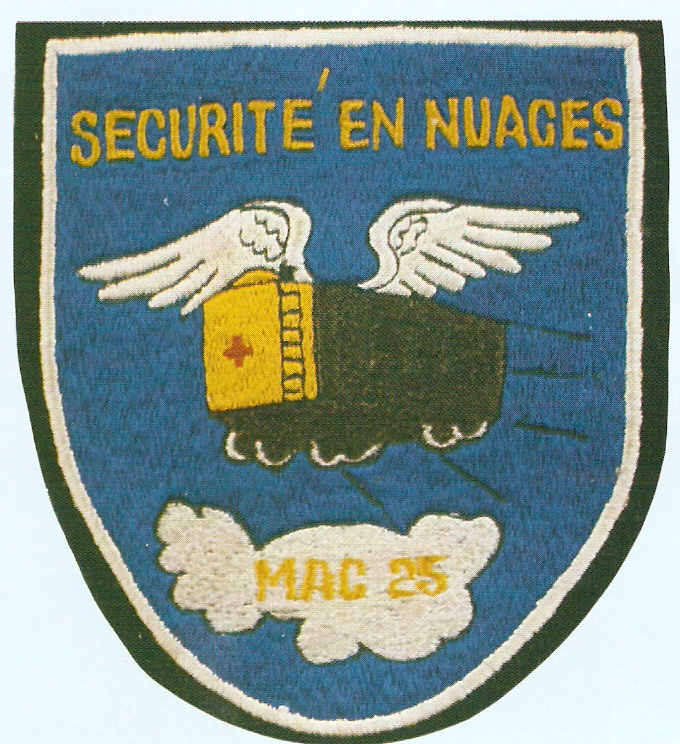
- MAG-25 insignia
- Active: July 1942-May 1947; February 1950-January 1956
- Country: United States
- Type: Utility/Transport
- Role: Assault support
- Part of: 1st Marine Aircraft Wing
- Nickname(s): Flying Boxcars
- Motto(s): Securité en Nuages
- Engagements: World War II * Guadalcanal Campaign * New Georgia Campaign * Battle of Vella Lavella * Bougainville Campaign * Philippines Campaign (1944-1945) * Operation Beleaguer; Korean War
- Decorations: Distinguished Unit Citation Navy Unit Commendation

Marine Air Group (MAG) 25 was a United States Marine Corps combat air transport group that provided logistical support, including cargo and personnel transport and aeromedical evacuation, to forward units during World War II and the Korean War. During World War II it formed the nucleus of the South Pacific Combat Air Transport Command.

== History ==
Marine Aircraft Group 25 was commissioned on June 1, 1942, at Camp Kearney, San Diego, California and initially consisted of Headquarters Squadron 25 and VMJ-253. On August 23, the squadron’s first echelon departed for the Pacific Theater via R4D and arrived at Marine Corps Air Station Ewa, Hawaii the following day. The Group initially based out of Tontouta, New Caledonia and began flying missions in support of the Battle of Guadalcanal in September 1942. On September 3, the first plane from MAG-25 landed at Henderson Field on Guadalcanal carrying the commanding general of the 1st Marine Aircraft Wing, Roy Geiger. MAG-25 was soon joined by the 13th Troop Carrier Squadron, United States Army Air Forces (USAAF), an uncommon inter-service cooperative effort. In late November 1942, at the direction of VAdm. Aubrey Fitch, MAG-25 formed the nucleus of SCAT, with its senior officer serving as SCAT's commanding officer throughout the organization's existence. MAG-25 soon grew to include VMJ-152 and SMS-25 of the Marine Corps, and the 801st Medical Air Evacuation Transport Squadron (MAETS), USAAF. In March 1943 it was joined by VMJ-153. From January to July 1944, Marine Air Repair & Salvage Squadron 1 (MAR&SSq-1) was attached to the group.

SCAT provided rapid transport of personnel and cargo, including munitions, food, replacement parts, and medical supplies, to and from forward areas. On rearward flights SCAT frequently provided aeromedical evacuation of wounded or sick personnel. Aircraft typically included a flight nurse, corpsman, or flight surgeon as part of the crew, split between USAAF personnel of the 801st MAETS and the Navy medical personnel of Headquarters Squadron-25. SOPAC Combat Air Transport Command was dissolved and reconstituted as Solomons Combat Air Transport Command after its Army Air Forces troop carrier units departed in July 1944, with MAG-25 continuing to utilize the "SCAT" acronym. At that time VMR-253 departed MAG-25 to join the Transport Air Group (TAG) in the Central Pacific. SCAT was finally dissolved in February 1945 as MAG-25's primary mission shifted to support of 1st Marine Aircraft Wing operations in the Philippines.

MAG-25, including the attached 13th Troop Carrier Squadron, was awarded the Distinguished Unit Citation as part of the 1st Marine Division (Reinforced) for the Guadalcanal campaign. SCAT received a Navy Unit Commendation for its operations in the South Pacific from December 1942 to July 1944.

In October 1945, MAG-25 began moving to Tsingtao, China, where VMR-153 participated in the evacuation of liberated prisoners from the Weixian Internment Camp. MAG-25 returned to the United States in June 1946 and was deactivated in 1947.

MAG-25 was reactivated in February 1950 at Marine Corps Air Station El Toro, with VMR-152, and VMR-352 attached, equipped with Douglas R5D aircraft. During the Korean War the group's forward echelon (Sub-Unit 2 of VMR-152) supported the operations of the 1st Marine Division and 1st Marine Aircraft Wing, flying mostly personnel and cargo transport missions while based at Itami, Japan. VMR-253, flying the Curtiss R5C and Fairchild R4Q, was reattached to the group in 1951. After the Korean Armistice Agreement, VMR-253 deployed to Itami to assist in post-armistice airlift operations.

The nickname "Flying Boxcars" was widely used for the Douglas R4D aircraft flown by MAG-25 during World War II, predating its attachment to the post-war Fairchild R4Q aircraft.

== Personnel ==
Notable former MAG-25 personnel include:

- Richard Nixon, 37th President of the United States, who served as officer-in-charge of SCAT forward detachments at Bougainville and Green Island while assigned to Headquarters Squadron-25.
- John P. Coursey, Brigadier general, who served as Group's executive officer in 1944
- David Douglas Duncan, photographer, who covered SCAT while assigned to VMD-154.
- George Roy Hill, director and actor, who served as a naval aviator in VMR-152.
- William K. Lanman, executive officer of VMJ-153 and later of MAG-25, who became a millionaire benefactor of Yale University.

== Unit awards ==
Since the beginning of World War II, the United States military has honored various units for extraordinary heroism or outstanding non-combat service. The following are the known awards that MAG-25 earned during their time in active service.

Streamer	Award	Year(s)	Additional Info
	Presidential Unit Citation Streamer with one Bronze Star	7 Aug 1942 - 9 Dec 1942	Guadalcanal Campaign
	Navy Unit Commendation Streamer	11 Dec 1942 - 15 Jul 1944	World War II,
	Asiatic-Pacific Campaign Streamer		
	World War II Victory Streamer	1942–1945	Pacific War
	Navy Occupation Service Streamer with "ASIA"		
	China Service Streamer	Sept 1946 - June 1947	North China
	National Defense Service Streamer	1950–1954	Korean War

== See also ==
- United States Marine Corps Aviation
- List of decommissioned United States Marine Corps aircraft squadrons
