= Pacific Ocean Areas =

U.S. military command in World War II

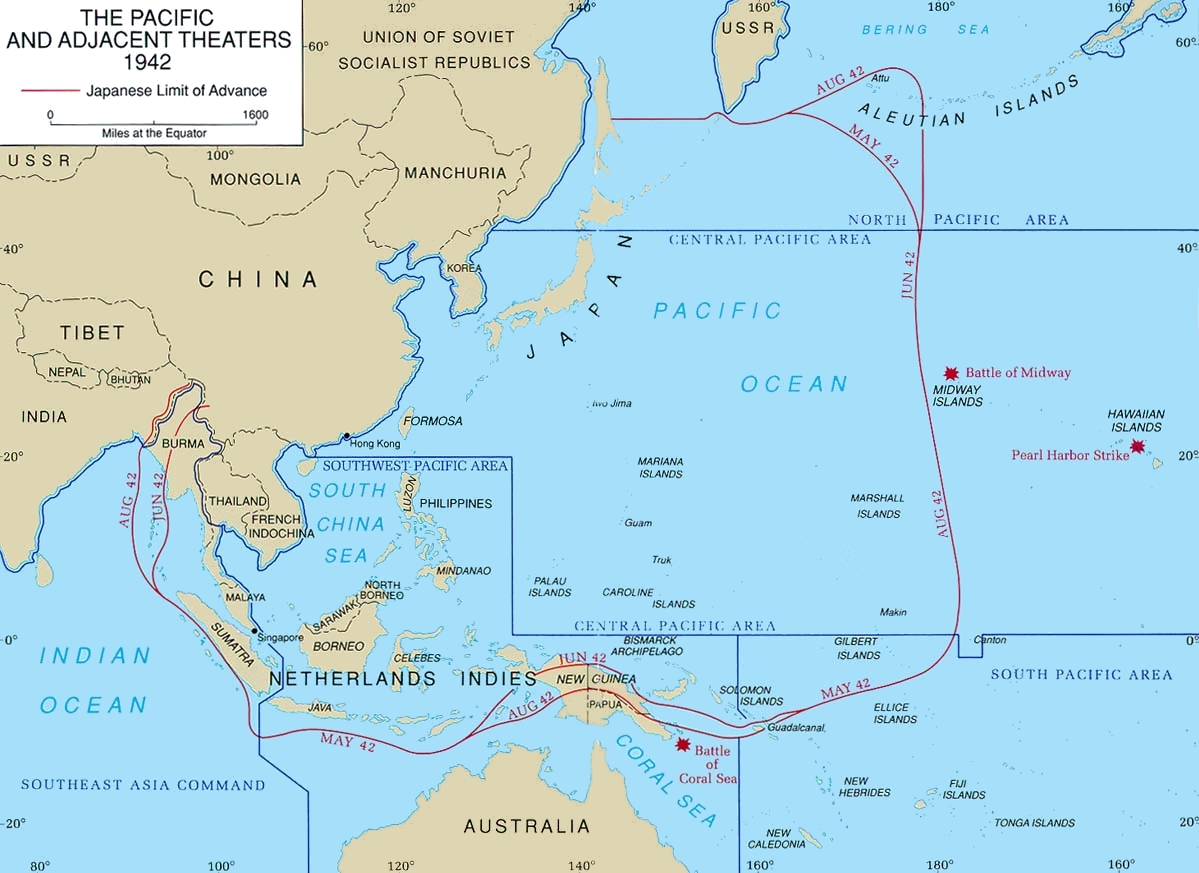
- Map of Pacific Ocean Areas
- Founded: March 30, 1942
- Disbanded: September 2, 1945
- Country: United States
- Part of: Asiatic-Pacific theater
- Garrison/HQ: Honolulu, Hawaii (1942–1945); Asan-Maina, Guam (1945)
- Nickname: POA
- Engagements: Pacific War

Commanders
- Commander in Chief: Chester W. Nimitz
- North Pacific Area: Robert A. Theobald; Thomas C. Kinkaid; Frank J. Fletcher
- South Pacific Area: Robert L. Ghormley; William Halsey, Jr.; John H. Newton; William L. Calhoun
- Army Air Forces: Millard F. Harmon

Insignia
- Shoulder sleeve

Pacific Ocean Areas (POA) was a major Allied military command in the Pacific Ocean theater of World War II. It was one of four major Allied commands during the Pacific War and one of three United States commands in the Asiatic-Pacific theater. Admiral Chester W. Nimitz of the U.S. Navy, Commander in Chief, U.S. Pacific Fleet, headed the command throughout its existence. The vast majority of Allied forces in the theatre were from the U.S. Navy, U.S. Army and U.S. Marine Corps. However units and/or personnel from New Zealand, the United Kingdom, Australia, Canada, Mexico, Fiji and other countries also saw active service.

== History ==
The delineation and establishment of the Pacific Ocean Areas was negotiated by the Allied governments of the United States, the United Kingdom, Australia, New Zealand, and the Kingdom of the Netherlands in March–April 1942 in response to the Japanese attacks in Southeast Asia and the Pacific. On 24 March 1942, the newly formed British and U.S. Combined Chiefs of Staff issued a directive designating the Pacific theater an area of American strategic responsibility. On 30 March the U.S. Joint Chiefs of Staff (JCS) divided the Pacific theater into three areas: the Pacific Ocean Areas (POA), the South West Pacific Area (SWPA), and the Southeast Pacific Area.

The JCS designated Admiral Chester Nimitz as Commander in Chief, Pacific Ocean Areas, with operational control over all units (air, land, and sea) in that area.

General Douglas MacArthur assumed command of the SWPA. With same level of authority as Admiral Nimtz.

The result of this split was the creation of two separate major commands in the Pacific: POA and SWPA, each reporting separately to the JCS, each competing for scarce resources in an economy-of-force theater, and each headed by a commander in chief from a different service.

The POA theater included most of the Pacific Ocean and its islands, but mainland Asia was excluded from the POA, as were the Philippines, Australia, the Netherlands East Indies, the Territory of New Guinea (including the Bismarck Archipelago) and the western part of the Solomon Islands. U.S. strategic bomber forces in the theatre were under the direct control of the JCS. All land forces in Alaska and Canada remained under the control of the U.S. Army's Western Defense Command.

The JCS subdivided the Pacific Ocean Areas into the North, Central and South Pacific Areas. Details and transition, including whether Nimitz "appointed" or "nominated" the commander of the South Pacific Area, were worked out between 3 April and formal assumption of the overall Commander-in-Chief Pacific Ocean Areas by Nimitz on 8 May 1942.

== Organization ==
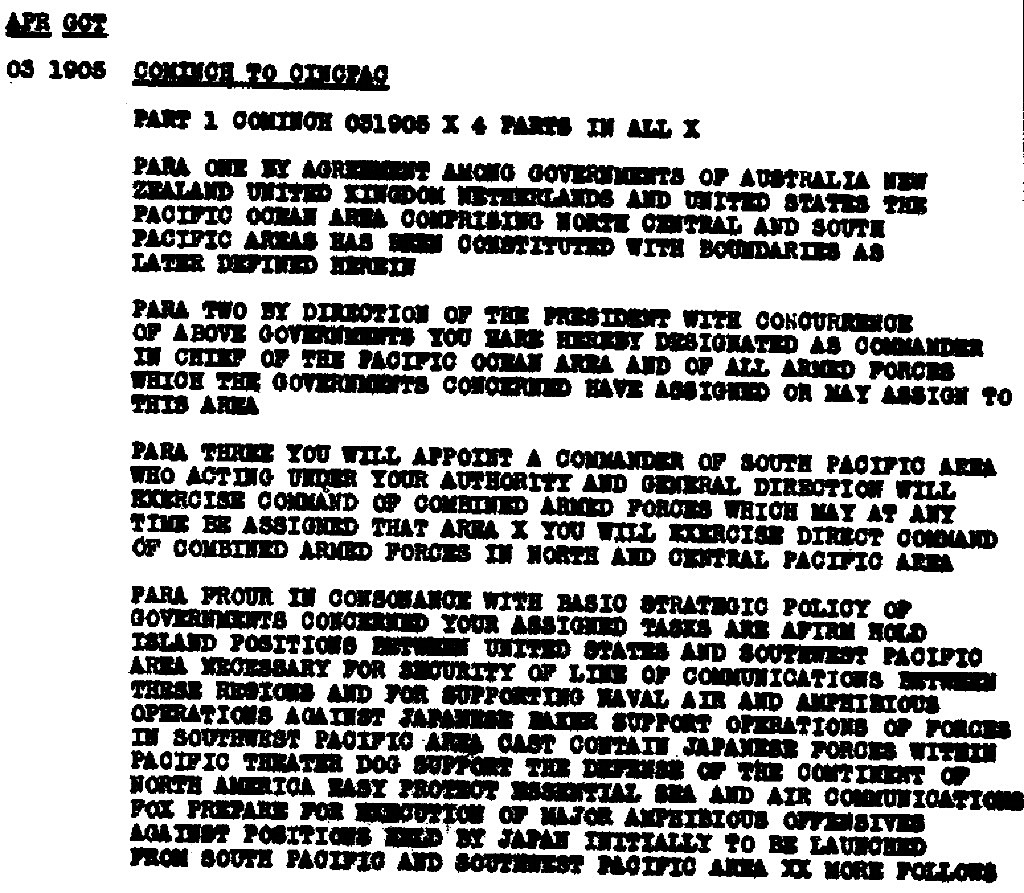
03 1905 APR 1942 message from COMINCH (Commander-in-Chief, United States Fleet, King) to CINCPAC (Commander-in-Chief, US Pacific Fleet, Nimitz) designating Nimitz Commander-in-Chief Pacific Ocean Area (first of four part message).

From 1942 to 1943, three Army infantry divisions (23rd/"Americal", 25th, 27th) and two Marine divisions (1st, 2nd) fought in the POA (the 1st and 3rd Marine Divisions also fought in the SWPA in 1943). From 1944 to 1945, five Army infantry divisions (7th, 27th, 77th, 81st, 96th) and six Marine divisions (1st, 2nd, 3rd, 4th, 5th, 6th) served in the POA. An additional 15 Army divisions fought in the SWPA during this time.

U.S. Army Air Forces operated in the POA under the Seventh, Thirteenth, and Twentieth Air Forces at various times. Allied air forces included units of the Royal New Zealand Air Force.

On 10 March 1944, the Department of War approved the activation of an additional AAF headquarters for the Pacific Ocean Areas. To head this new command the Air Staff in Washington DC had decided as early as 16 April upon Lt. Gen. Millard F. Harmon, who, as commander of U.S. Army Forces, South Pacific Area, had had long experience in the Pacific. By May the War Department proposed that Lt. Gen. Robert C. Richardson Jr., commanding U.S. Army Forces Central Pacific Area, be named Commanding General of U.S. Army Forces, Pacific Ocean Areas. Harmon was made responsible to Nimitz for all matters regarding 'plans, operations, training, and dispositions' of his forces. In addition, as deputy commander of the Twentieth Air Force, Harmon was made responsible directly to Arnold in all matters affecting elements of the Twentieth Air Force in POA.

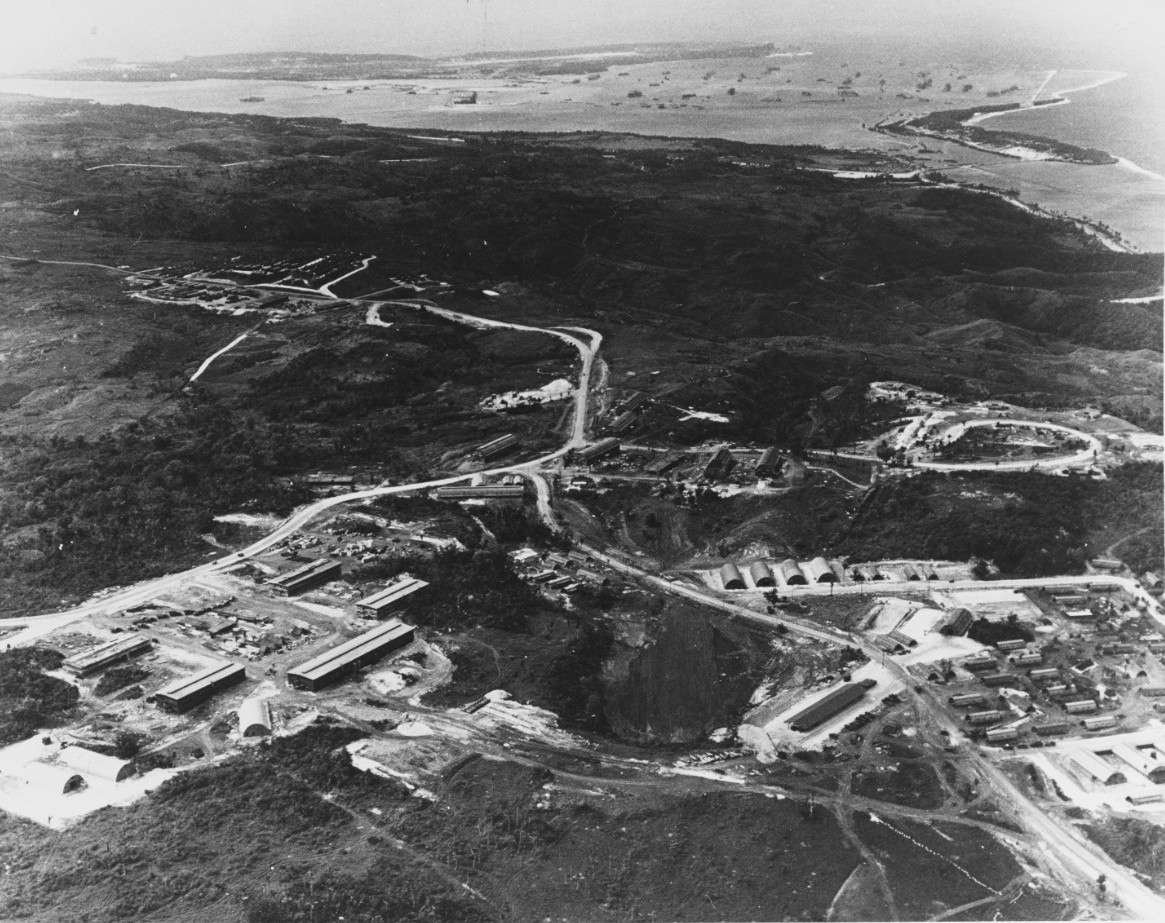
CinCPac-POA headquarters being built in Asan-Maina, Guam in January 1945, when it was moved forward from Honolulu

Activation of Headquarters, Army Air Forces, Pacific Ocean Areas (AAFPOA) at Hickam Field followed on 1 August 1944. The Seventh Air Force, formerly the senior command, was made "mobile and tactichi" on 15 August by the reassignment of 112 units of various types to AAFPOA. The VII Air Force Service Command, its former administrative functions having been assumed by Breene as AAFPOA deputy commander for administration, was transferred to ASC/AAFPOA, where it lost its identity as an operating agency. The Seventh Air Force was left only VII Bomber Command and VII Fighter Command. The other AAFPOA operating forces were XXI Bomber Command and the Hawaiian Air Defense Wing(?) (probable source misprint for 7th Fighter Wing). In preparation for the support of VHB units, the Hawaiian Air Depot was expanded and assigned directly to AAFPOA. For the forward or combat area, plans were laid for a Guam Air Depot (later, Harmon Air Force Base), which was established in November.

=== North Pacific Area ===
During the 1942 Aleutian Islands campaign Rear Admiral Robert A. Theobald commanded Task Force 8 afloat. Theobald as Commander North Pacific Force reported to Nimitz in Hawaii. Task Force 8 consisted of five cruisers, thirteen destroyers, three tankers, six submarines, as well as naval aviation elements of Fleet Air Wing Four.

- Rear Adm. Robert A. Theobald (17 May 1942 – 4 January 1943)
- Rear Adm. Thomas C. Kinkaid (4 January–11 October 1943)
- Vice Adm. Frank J. Fletcher (11 October 1943 – 2 September 1945)

=== Central Pacific Area ===
Nimitz designated subordinate commanders for the North and South Pacific Areas but retained the Central Pacific Area, including the Army's Hawaiian Department, under his direct command.

=== South Pacific Area ===
The South Pacific Area was bounded on the west by the Southwest Pacific Area, on the north by the Central Pacific Area, and on the east by the Southeast Pacific Area. It originally encompassed the Ellice, Phoenix, Marquesas, Tuamotu, Samoa, Fiji, and New Hebrides island groups plus New Caledonia and New Zealand. Its western boundary was shifted to just west of Guadalcanal on 1 August 1942 to facilitate operations against that island.

The assignment orders for Major General Millard Harmon as the Commanding General, Army Forces, South Pacific, dated 7 July 1942, said:

The establishment of the Pacific Ocean Area as an area of United States strategical responsibility under the command of the Commander-in-Chief, U.S. Pacific Fleet, became effective on May 8, 1942. The Commander-in-Chief, U.S. Pacific Fleet, has been designated the "Commander-in-Chief, Pacific Ocean Area". Under the Commander-in-Chief, Pacific Ocean Area, a U.S. Naval officer has been designated as "Commander, South Pacific Area". The South Pacific Force under COMSOPAC include the following:

1. All base and local defense forces (ground, naval and air) now assigned or to be assigned to forces in the South Pacific Area. The New Zealand Chiefs of Staff are responsible for the land defense of New Zealand, subject to such strategic decisions affecting this responsibility as may be made by the Commander-in-Chief, Pacific Fleet, for the conduct of naval operations in the Pacific Ocean Areas.
2. Assigned New Zealand, Free French, Dutch and other United Nations Naval forces.
3. Such fleet types and aircraft as may be assigned by the Commander-in-Chief, U.S. Pacific Fleet.

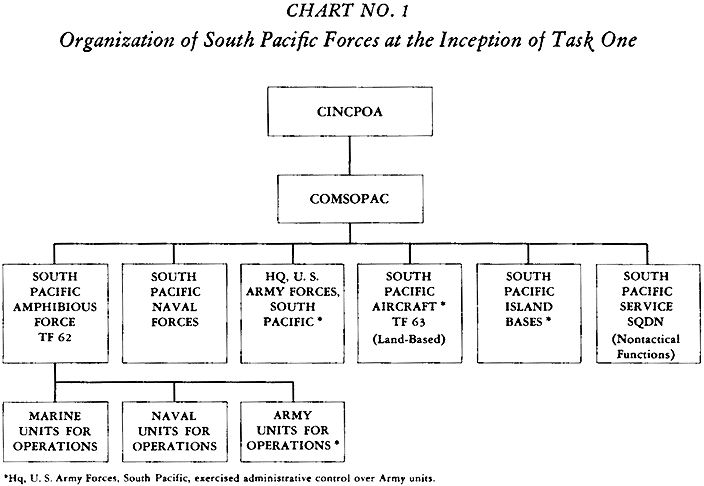
Organization of South Pacific Forces just before Task One, the invasion of Guadalcanal

In July 1942 the South Pacific Area, under Admiral Robert L. Ghormley, superseded by Admiral William Halsey Jr. from 16 October, comprised four commands: Amphibious Forces, South Pacific (AmphibForSoPac), under Admiral Richmond K. Turner, South Pacific Naval Forces under Admiral Ghormley, U.S. Army Forces South Pacific under Major General Millard Harmon, and South Pacific Air Forces under Admiral John S. McCain, Sr. At a later stage Transport Group, South Pacific (TransGrpSoPac) was added to the organisation. Among allied land force formations was the 3rd New Zealand Division, which fought in the Solomon Islands campaign during 1943–44.

The organisation's first major battle was the Battle of Guadalcanal. Admiral Ghormley's Operations Order 1-42 established two task forces, Task Force 61 and Task Force 63, to carry out the operation. In particular, the division of the Solomons caused problems, since the battles of the Solomon Islands campaign in 1942–1943 ranged over the whole region, with the main Japanese bases in SWPA and the main Allied bases in POA. However, MacArthur's Operation Cartwheel, which gave full operational command of naval and amphibious forces to POA's Admiral William Halsey in the Solomons while MacArthur strategically directed the whole operation, was a resounding success because of the rapport and great personal relationship between MacArthur and Halsey. When Halsey operated in the Solomon Islands that was west of 159° east longitude he reported to MacArthur. When he operated east of 159° east longitude he reported to Nimitz. The 159° meridian east runs through the middle of Santa Isabel Island.

On September 20, 1942, six weeks after the first American amphibious operation of the war got underway at Guadalcanal, Vice Admiral Aubrey Fitch assumed command of Aircraft, South Pacific Force (AirSoPac). Not a desk-bound admiral, he carried out numerous, hazardous flights into the combat zones, inspecting air activities and bases for projected operations. For these, he received a Distinguished Flying Cross. AirSoPac ultimately encompassing U.S. Navy, Army, Marine Corps, and Royal New Zealand Air Force air units. It saw great success aiding the Allied campaign in the area.

Commander, Aircraft, Solomons (ComAirSols), directed the combat operations of all land-based air forces in the Solomons during Operation Cartwheel, under the direction of AirSoPac. Rear Admiral Charles P. Mason was the first officer to hold the title ComAirSols; he assumed command on 15 February 1943 at Guadalcanal. Actually, Mason took over a going concern, as he relieved Brigadier General Francis P. Mulcahy, who had controlled all aircraft stationed at the island during the final phase of its defense. Mulcahy, who became Mason's chief of staff, was also Commanding General, 2d Marine Aircraft Wing. The fact that a general headed the staff of an admiral is perhaps the best indication of the multiservice nature of AirSols operations.

Vice Admiral Finch retained two areas of flight operations under his direct control; sea search by long range Navy patrol planes and Army bombers, and transport operations by South Pacific Combat Air Transport Command (SCAT). Throughout its long and useful life (November 1942-February 1945), SCAT's complement of Marine and Army transports was headed by Marine Aircraft Group 25's commanding officer. SCAT's operations area moved northward with the fighting during 1943, and by August's end, all regularly scheduled flights in SoPac's rear areas were being handled by the Naval Air Transport Service (NATS).

- Vice Admiral Robert L. Ghormley (17 May–18 October 1942)
- Vice Adm./Adm. William Halsey, Jr. (18 October 1942 – 15 June 1944)
- Vice Adm. John H. Newton (15 June 1944 – 13 March 1945)
- Vice Admiral William L. Calhoun (13 March–2 September 1945)

== See also ==
- United States Army Air Forces in the South Pacific Area
- United States Navy in World War II
- US Naval Advance Bases
