= 801st Medical Air Evacuation Squadron =

- Country: United States
- Role: Aeromedical evacuation
- Engagements: World War II * Guadalcanal Campaign * New Georgia Campaign * Battle of Vella Lavella * Bougainville Campaign * New Guinea Campaign * Philippines Campaign (1944-1945); Korean War
- Decorations: Distinguished Unit Citation Army Presidential Unit Citation Air Force Navy Unit Commendation

The 801st Medical Air Evacuation Squadron was a United States Army Air Forces (USAAF) unit that provided aeromedical evacuation and support services to front-line units in the Pacific Theater of World War II. From the latter part of the Guadalcanal Campaign through Operation Cartwheel it was attached to Marine Aircraft Group 25 and the South Pacific Combat Air Transport Command (SCAT).

== History ==
The squadron organized at Bowman Field, Kentucky, as the 801st Medical Squadron, Air Evacuation Transport, and was rushed to the South Pacific for service during the Guadalcanal Campaign before its training regimen was complete. The 801st was the first Air Evacuation Transport squadron to deploy, and as such its nurses were some of the first American women of the war to enter forward areas during offensive operations. It began arriving in New Caledonia in January 1943, starting with a cadre of male flight surgeons who participated in the latter phase of the Guadalcanal Campaign. It was directly attached to the USAAF 13th Troop Carrier Squadron, which itself was attached to MAG-25. On 28 February 1943, a nurse of the 801st Medical Squadron became the first American servicewoman to land on Guadalcanal. In May 1943 the squadron was renamed the 801st Medical Air Evacuation Transport Squadron (MAETS).

As the only component of SCAT specifically trained in aeromedical evacuation, the 801st contributed to operations throughout the advance through the Solomon Islands. SCAT crews typically included a nurse, medical corpsman, or flight surgeon from the 801st, or a hospital corpsman or flight surgeon from Headquarters Squadron, MAG-25. After the Bougainville Campaign the 801st, recently renamed a Medical Air Evacuation Squadron (MAES), separated from MAG-25 and continued its service in the Southwest Pacific under the 54th Troop Carrier Wing of the U.S. Fifth Air Force.

The 801st MAES received a Distinguished Unit Citation for operations during the Philippines Campaign. SCAT, including the 801st MAETS, received a Navy Unit Commendation for its operations in the South Pacific from December 1942 to July 1944.

The 801st MAES resumed its role during the Korean War, operating as part of the 315th Air Division of the United States Air Force, and received the Presidential Unit Citation for evacuation of over 6,000 casualties during September and December, 1950.
