= VMGR-153 =

Marine Aerial Refueler Transport Squadron 153
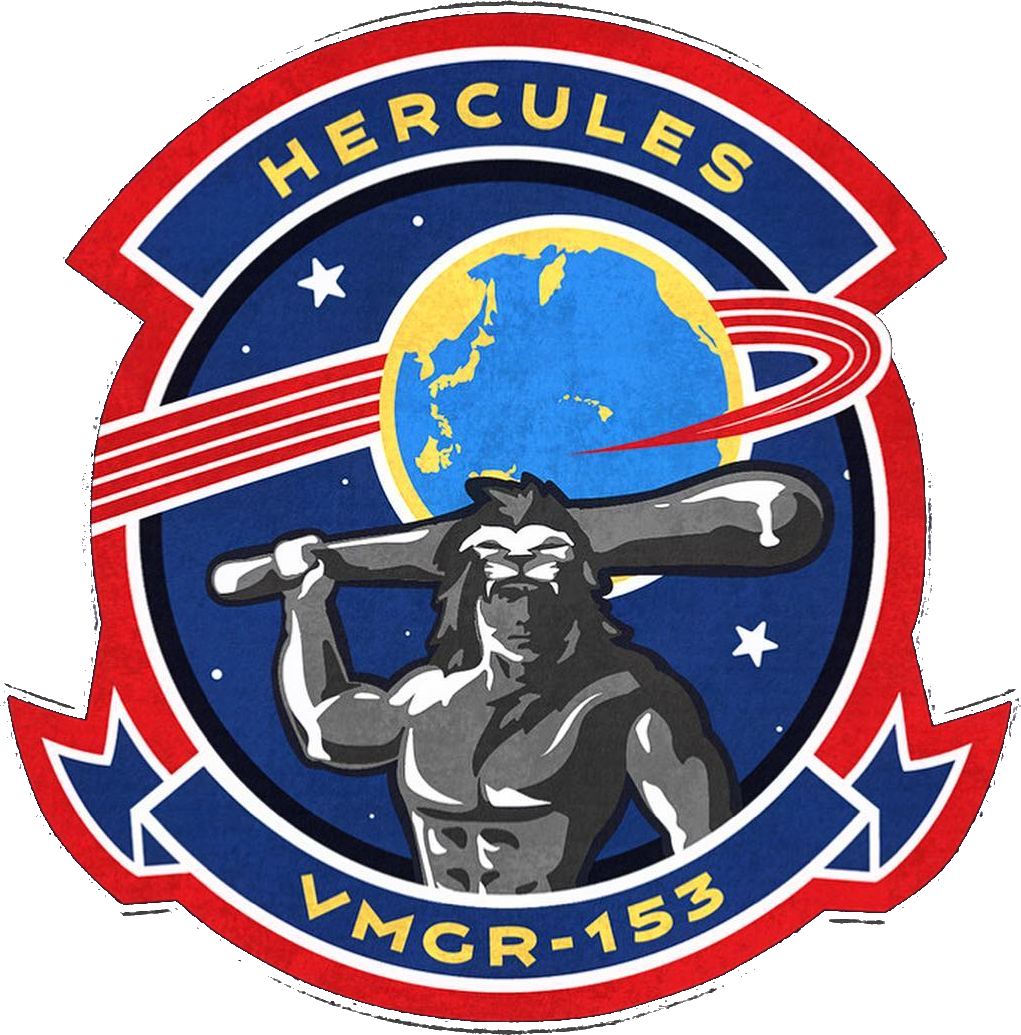
- VMGR-153 insignia
- Active: 1 Mar 1942 - 20 May 1959 Jan 13, 2023 - TBD
- Country: United States of America
- Branch: United States Marine Corps
- Type: Utility/Transport
- Role: Assault support
- Part of: Marine Aircraft Group 24; 1st Marine Aircraft Wing
- Nickname: Hercules
- Motto: Leo Rugit Rursum (The Lion Roars Again)
- Engagements: World War II * New Georgia Campaign * Battle of Vella Lavella * Bougainville Campaign * Philippines Campaign (1944-1945) * Operation Beleaguer

Commanders
- Current commander: LtCol Slade B. Ermis

Marine Aerial Refueler Transport Squadron 153 (VMGR-153) is a United States Marine Corps KC-130J squadron. The squadron is a part of Marine Aircraft Group 24 (MAG-24), 1st Marine Aircraft Wing (1st MAW) and provides both fixed-wing and rotary-wing aerial refueling capabilities to support Fleet Marine Force (FMF) air operations in addition to assault air transport of personnel, equipment, and supplies. During World War II, the squadron was under the command of Marine Aircraft Group 25 and the South Pacific Combat Air Transport Command (SCAT). It delivered approximately 15,000,000 pounds of supplies and equipment, evacuated more than 20,000 casualties, and moved an additional 8,000 personnel throughout the Pacific Theater. VMGR-153 is part of Marine Aircraft Group 24 (MAG-24) and is stationed at Marine Corps Air Station Kaneohe Bay, Hawaii.

== History ==
=== World War II ===
Marine Utility Squadron 153 (VMJ-153) was commissioned on 1 March 1942 at Camp Kearney, San Diego, California.

VMJ-153 arrived overseas at Tontouta, New Caledonia on 20 March 1943, joining Sthe South Pacific Combat Air Transport Command (SCAT) prior to the invasion of New Georgia. SCAT provided rapid transport of personnel and cargo, including munitions, food, replacement parts, and medical supplies, to and from forward areas. On rearward flights SCAT frequently provided aeromedical evacuation of wounded or sick personnel. These missions continued under MAG-25 and, until February 1945, Solomons Combat Air Transport Command, after the dissolution of SOPAC Combat Air Transport Command in July 1944. Like other Marine Corps utility squadrons in-theater, VMJ-153 was redesignated as a Marine Transport Squadron (VMR) on 20 July 1944. As a component of SCAT, VMR-153 received a Navy Unit Commendation for its operations in the South Pacific from December 1942 to July 1944.

=== Post War operations ===
In October 1945, MAG-25 moved to Qingdao, China, where VMR-153 participated in the evacuation of liberated prisoners from the Weixian Internment Camp. VMR-153 regularly flew personnel and equipment through Singapore, Manchuria, Hong Kong, Shanghai and Beiping. From 2–6 February 1948, VMR-153 flew 26 flights to evacuate 49 personnel from the United States Consulate in Changchun, Manchuria. During this time the squadron moved 42, 330 pounds of cargo. This was followed by the evacuation of another U.S. consulate in Mukden from 9–12 February 1948 during which the squadron moved 28 personnel and 52,891 pounds of cargo. The squadron departed Qingdao in January 1949 with the last elements of Marine Corps aviation to depart China. They initially flew to Guam where the unit stayed for two weeks before flying on to California. On 17 February 1949 the last of the squadron's aircraft arrived at Moffett Airfield. VMR-153 arrived at MCAS Cherry Point on 22 February 1949 joining the 2nd Marine Aircraft Wing. At the outbreak of the Korean War, the squadron was kept busy flying newly activated reservists to the West Coast prior to their shipping out.

During October 1955, VMR-153 and VMR-252 flew disaster relief missions to Tampico, Mexico in the wake of Hurricane Hilda The squadron was decommissioned on 20 May 1959.

=== Reactivation ===
VMGR-153 was reactivated on 13 January 2023 at Marine Corps Air Station Kaneohe Bay, Hawaii. Over the course of the next two years the squadron is planned to receive its full complement of 17 aircraft.

== Accidents ==
- 27 December 1943 - An R4D-5 (BuNo 12432) flying from Tontouta Airfield to Espiritu Santo carrying 5 crew members and 19 passengers never arrived. The planes was never found however small pieces of wreckage were discovered near Uvea Atoll.
- 12 July 1944 - A Douglas R4D-5 (BuNo 17180) piloted by Maj Edward W. Megson and carrying 15 personnel crashed into Maru Peak on the southeastern tip of Guadalcanal killing everyone onboard. All of the remains were recovered after the war.
- 7 October 1944 - An R4D-5 (BuNo 39806) carrying 7 crew members and 12 passengers crashed near Vella Lavella during heavy rains killing all onboard.

== Notable former members ==
- John Otis Carney - navigator, who authored numerous screenplays and books.
- William K. Lanman, executive officer, who became a millionaire benefactor of Yale University.

== Gallery ==
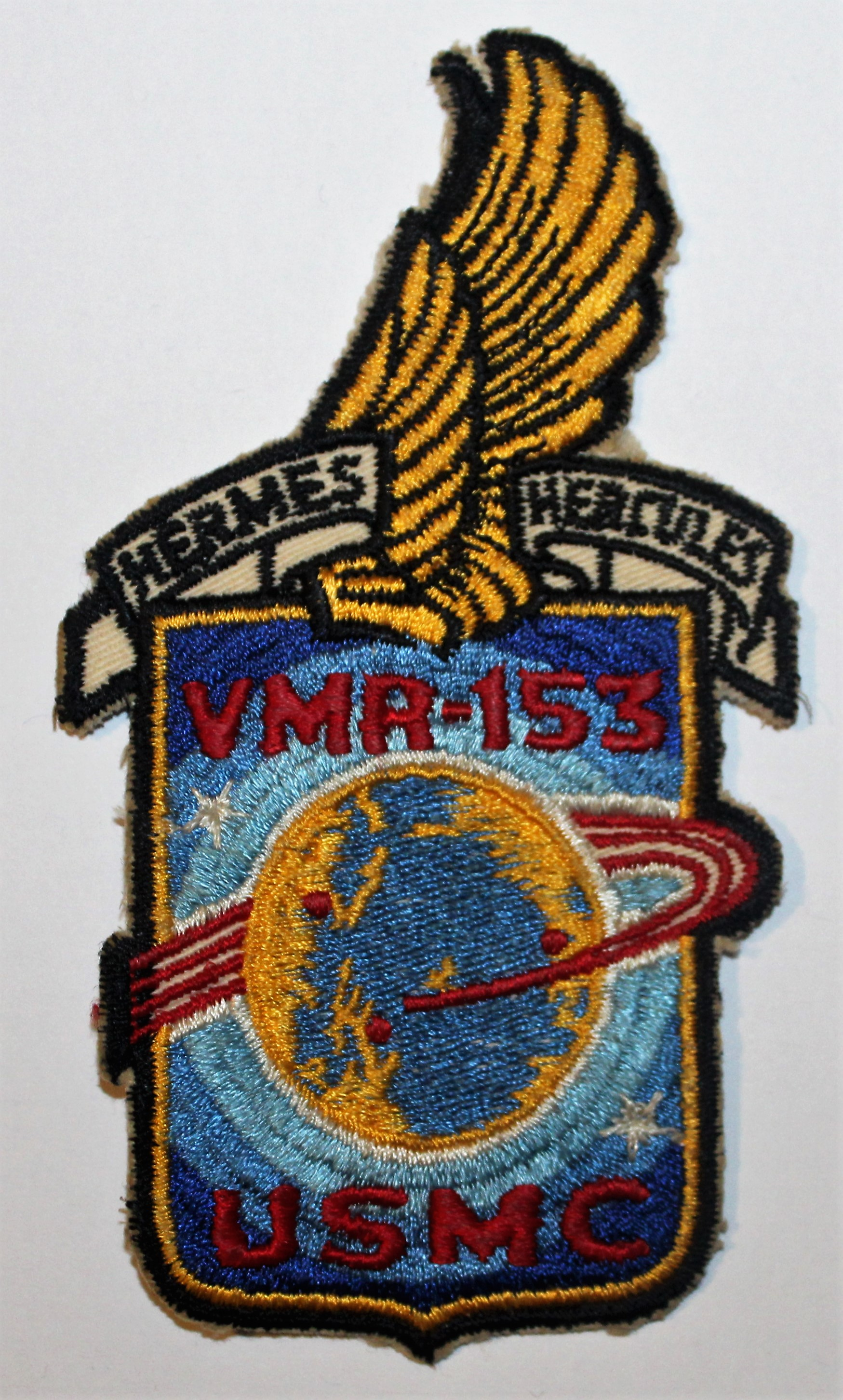

== See also ==
- United States Marine Corps Aviation
- List of United States Marine Corps aircraft squadrons
- List of decommissioned United States Marine Corps aircraft squadrons
