= Payne Whitney Gymnasium =

Athletic facility of Yale University

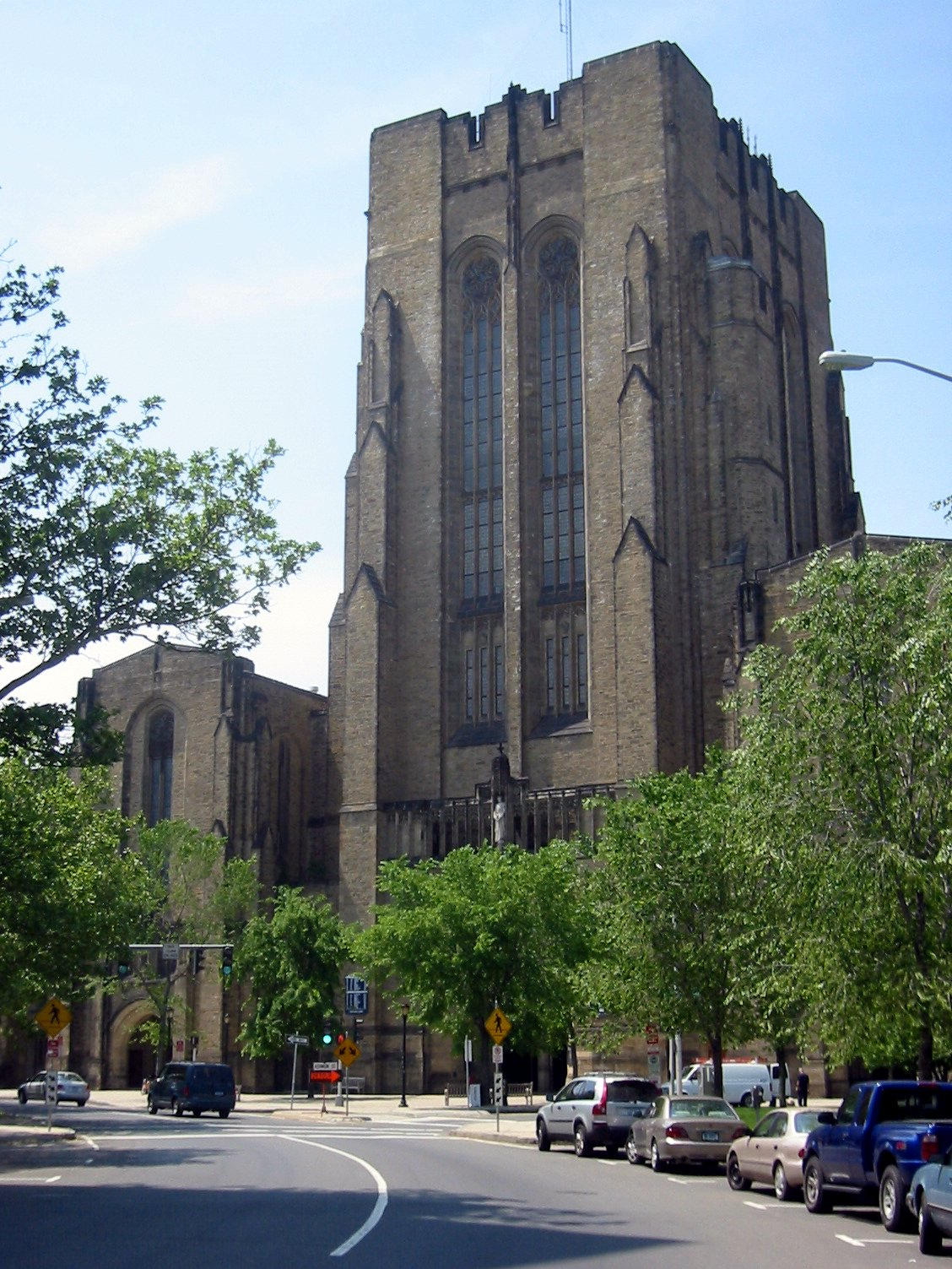
- Interactive map of Payne Whitney Gymnasium
- Location: 70 Tower Parkway; New Haven, CT 06511
- Coordinates: 41°18′49″N 72°55′50″W
- Owner: Yale University
- Operator: Yale University
- Capacity: 2,532 (Lee Amphitheater); 2,178 (Kiphuth Exhibition Pool)

Construction
- Opened: 1932
- Architect: John Russell Pope

Tenants
- Yale Bulldogs (basketball, fencing, gymnastics, squash, swimming, & volleyball)

The Payne Whitney Gymnasium is the gymnasium of Yale University in New Haven, Connecticut. One of the largest athletic facilities ever built, its twelve acres of interior space include a nine-story tower containing a third-floor swimming pool, fencing facilities, and a polo practice room. The building houses the facilities of many varsity teams at Yale, including basketball, fencing, gymnastics, squash, swimming, and volleyball. It is the second-largest gym in the world by cubic feet.

The building was donated to Yale by John Hay Whitney, of the Yale class of 1926, in honor of his father, Payne Whitney. Because it was designed in the Gothic Revival style that prevailed at Yale between 1920 and 1945, it is commonly known as "the cathedral of sweat". For the design of Payne Whitney Gymnasium, architect John Russell Pope was awarded the Silver Medal at the 1932 Olympic Games Art Competition.

The stuffed original Handsome Dan, the bulldog mascot of Yale and the first college mascot in the United States, resides in a glass cabinet near the entrance to the building.

== Facilities ==
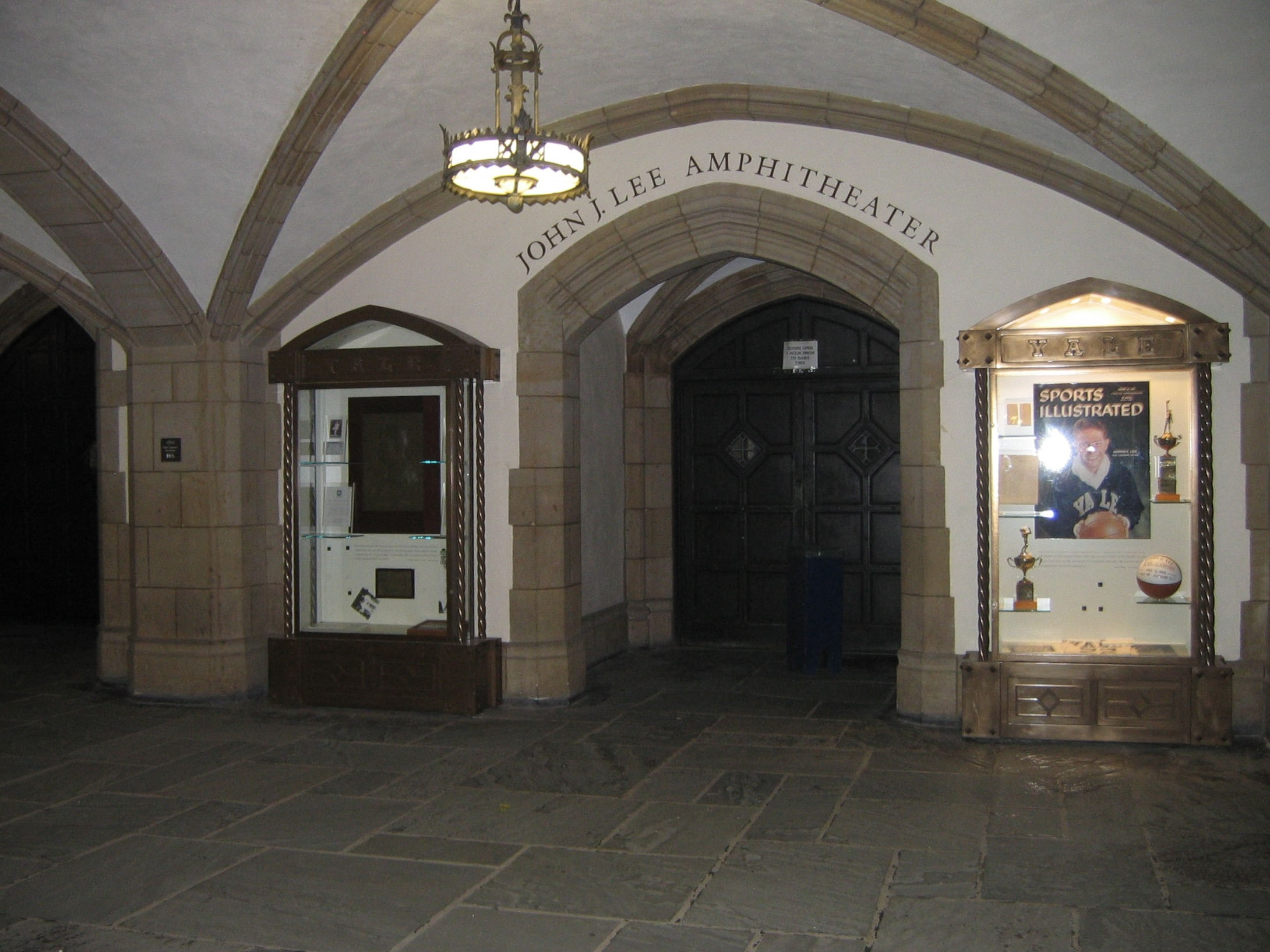
Entrance to Lee Amphitheater (2008)

The basketball team plays in the John J. Lee Amphitheater, which was named in 1996 for John J. Lee, '56 M.Eng., a star basketball player and benefactor in restoration projects; the volleyball and gymnastics teams also compete in the Amphiteater. The wing opposite the Amphiteater houses the Robert J. H. Kiphuth Exhibition Pool (6 lanes, 25 yards), where the swimming teams compete. The pool is named for Yale's legendary swimming coach and athletic director.

A series of three crew tanks runs along the back of the gym, providing training facilities for the crews. Above the crew tanks is the Practice Pool, one of the world's largest suspended natatoriums (5 lanes, 50 meters, 2 bulkheads). Above the Practice Pool are recreational basketball courts.

On the wings, the Adrian "Ace" Israel Fitness Center is located above the Kiphuth Exhibition Pool, and the Brady Squash Center is located above the Amphitheater. The Squash Center, one of the world's premier competition facilities, is also home to the U.S. Squash Hall of Fame. The roof of the Squash Center has a small outdoor running track.

The tower itself contains the Kiphuth Trophy Room (where mementos from Harvard-Yale game balls to Olympic gold medals are displayed), several multi-purpose recreational areas, the fencing salon, and the gymnastics studio.

The Lanman Center, located behind the Amphitheater wing, provides a vast spread of additional flexible floor space, with a balcony running track ringing the facility.

== Renovation ==
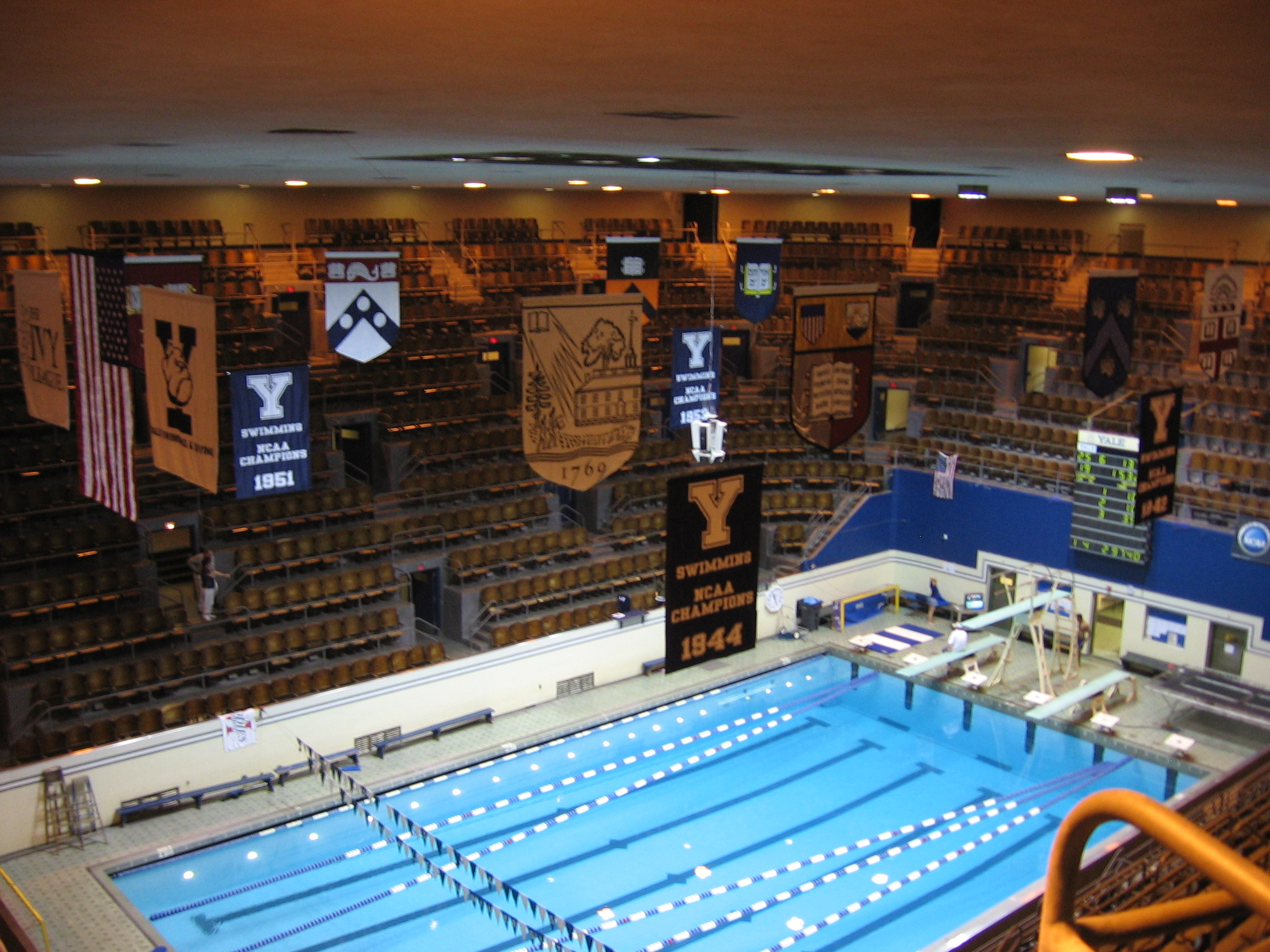
Exhibition pool

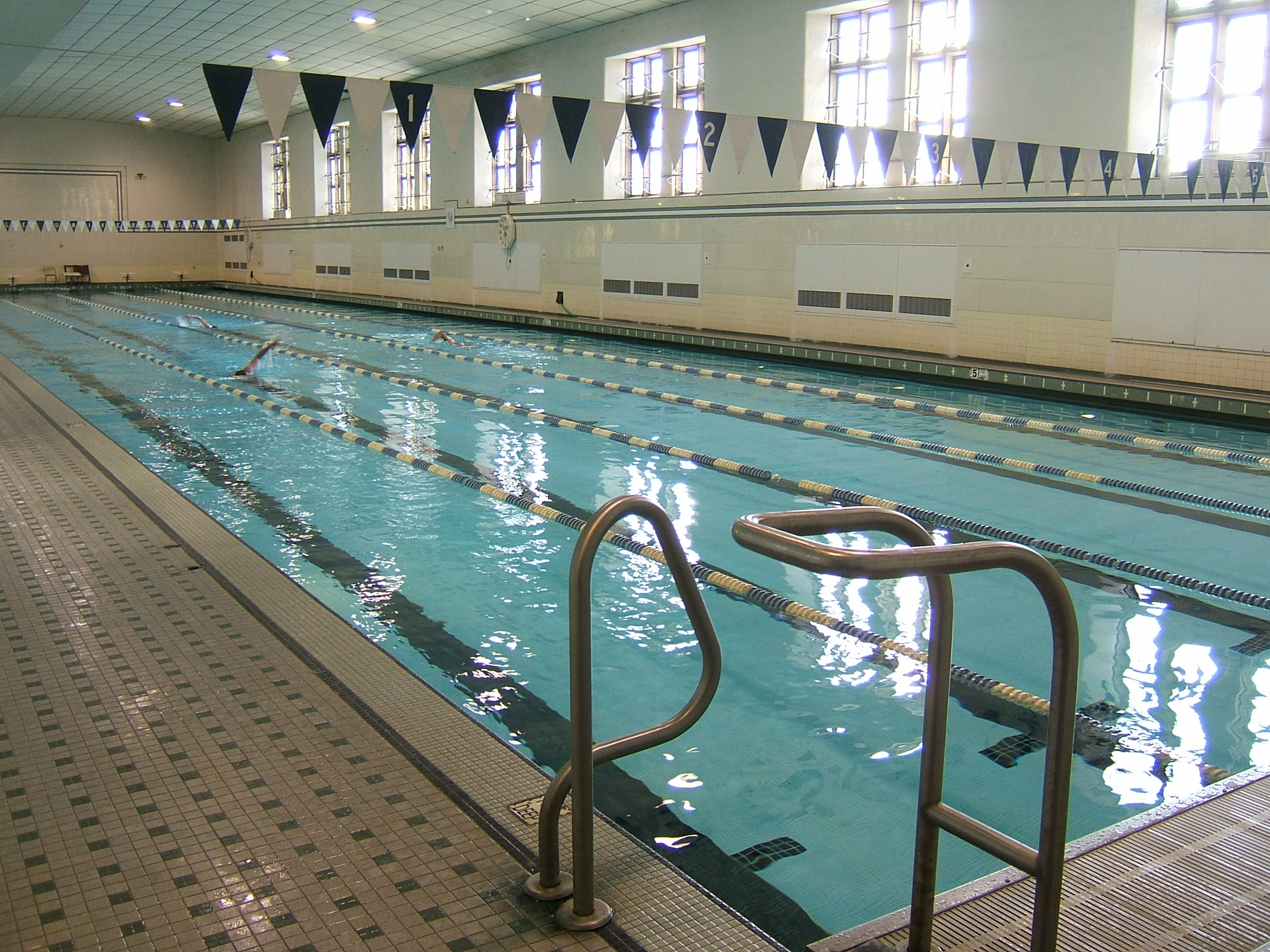
Practice pool

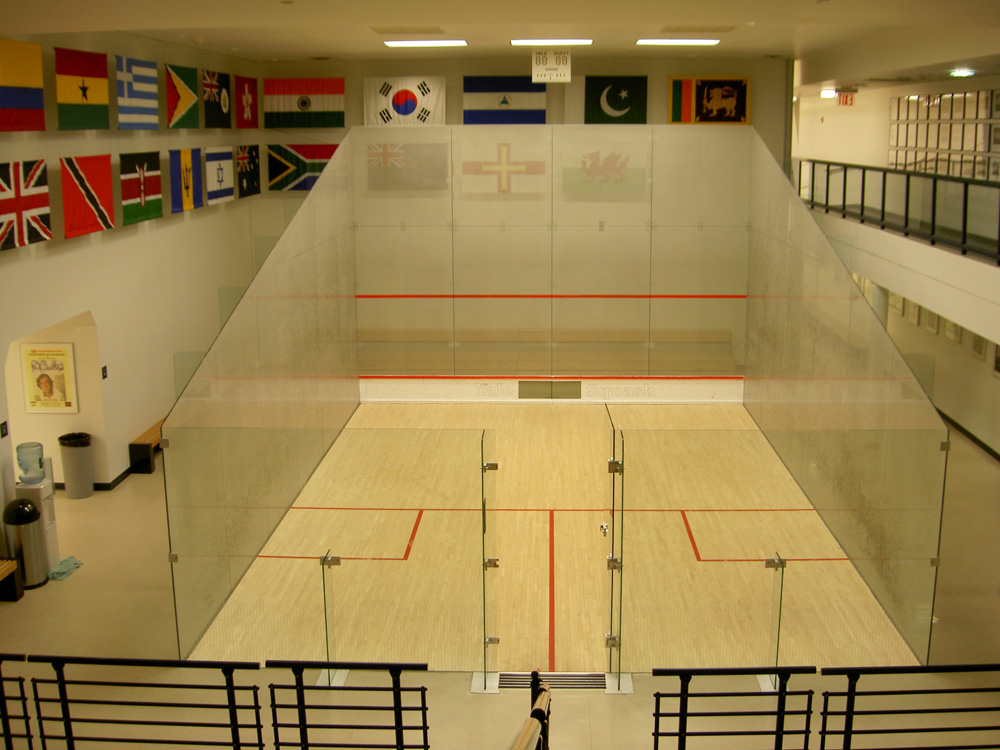
Squash courts

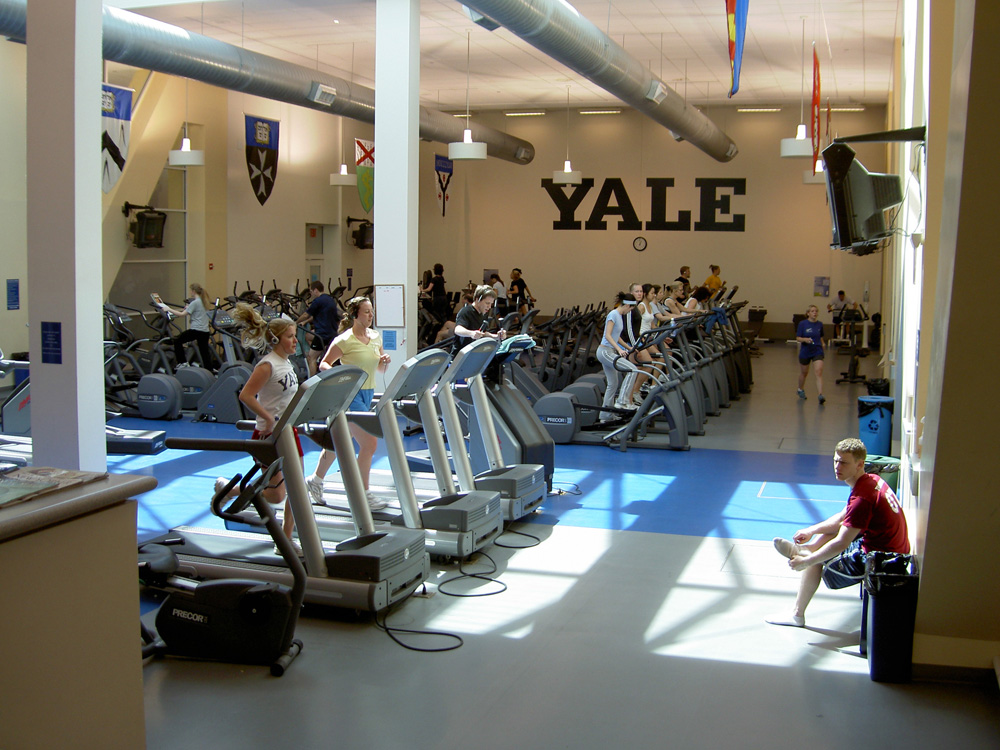
Fitness center

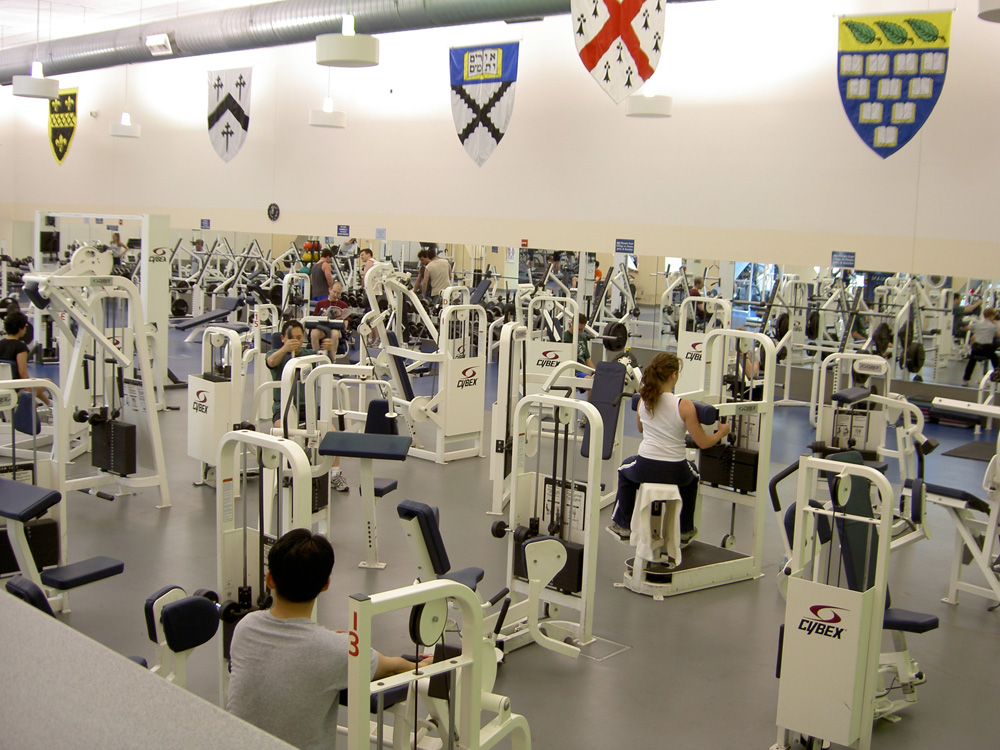
Fitness center

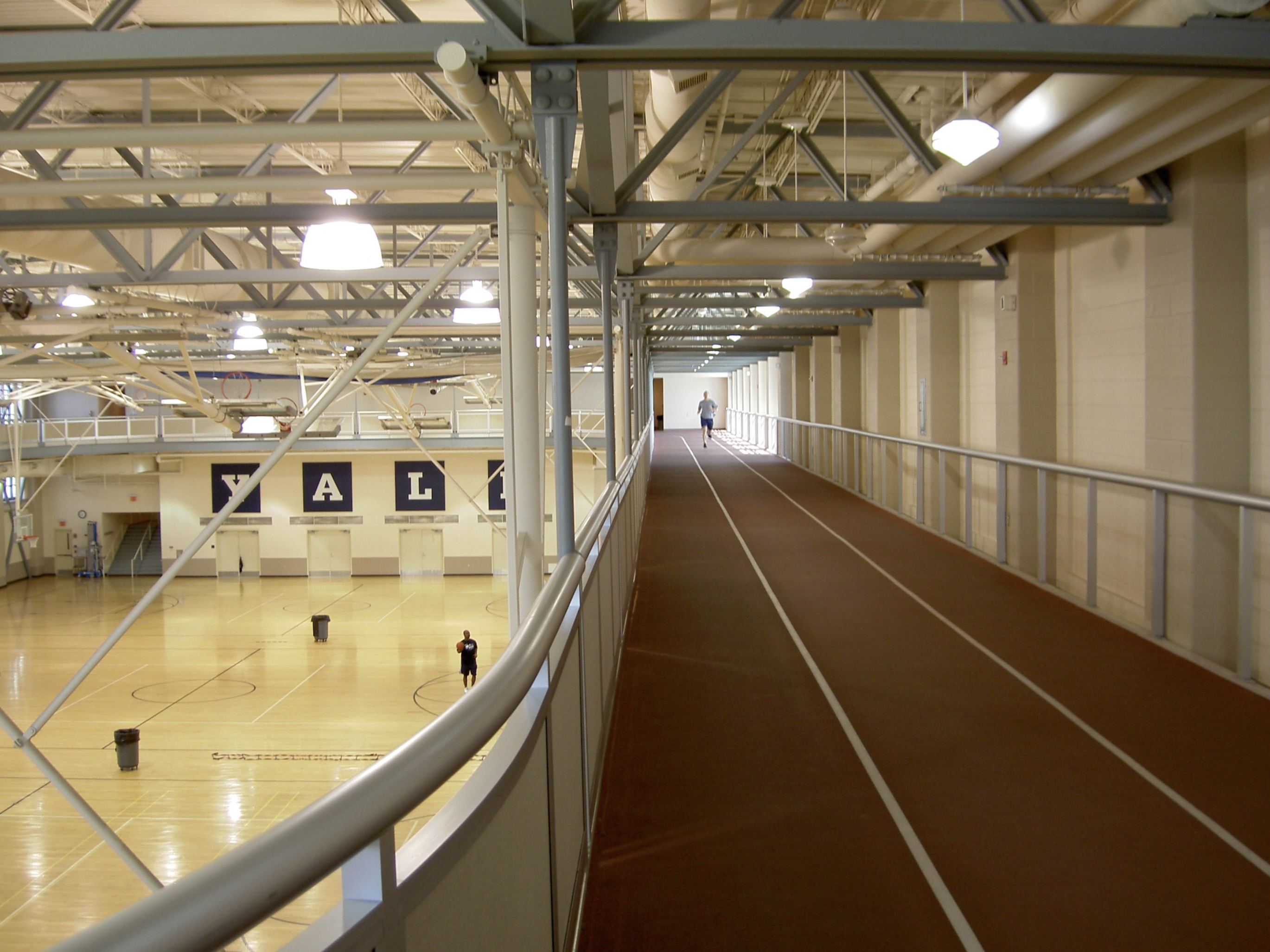
Lanman Center

The William K. Lanman Center was added in 1999 as a new wing, with additional courts for basketball and volleyball, and an indoor running track. This was the first phase of a $100 million renovation program.

In 2006 the building was having external work done to repair flashing and stop leaks. Other work included the purchasing of banners and benches for the Kiphuth Exhibition Pool, the resurfacing of the floor in the Lee Amphitheater, and the upgrading of the Practice Pool's filtration system.

== See also ==
- List of NCAA Division I basketball arenas

Preceded by Jerome Schottenstein Center	Host of the Jeopardy! College Championship; 2003	Succeeded by Petersen Events Center
