= VMR-152 =

Marine Transport Squadron 152
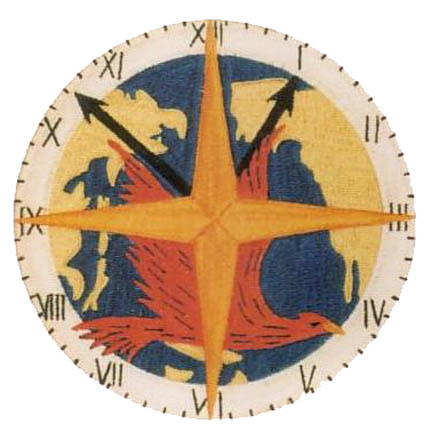
- VMR-152 insignia (post-WWII)
- Active: 1922 - 31 Jan 1959
- Country: United States
- Allegiance: United States of America
- Branch: United States Marine Corps
- Type: Utility/Transport
- Role: Assault support
- Part of: Inactive
- Tail Code: WC
- Engagements: World War II * Battle of Guadalcanal * New Georgia Campaign * Battle of Vella Lavella * Bougainville Campaign * Philippines Campaign (1944-1945) * Operation Beleaguer; Korean War * Battle of Chosin Reservoir
- Decorations: Distinguished Unit Citation Navy Unit Commendation

Commanders
- Notable commanders: John P. Coursey

Aircraft flown
- Transport: R4D; R5D Skymaster; R4Q Flying Boxcar

Marine Transport Squadron 152 (VMR-152) was an air transport squadron of the United States Marine Corps that was responsible for the movement of personnel, equipment, and supplies. The squadron flew fixed-wing cargo aircraft to include the R4D Skytrain and the R4Q Flying Boxcar. The squadron saw combat during World War II and the Korean War with their most notable contributions coming during the Battle of Guadalcanal and during the Marine breakout during the Battle of Chosin Reservoir. The squadron was decommissioned in the late 1950s.

== Mission ==
Provide air transport of personnel, equipment, and supplies, including aeromedical evacuation.

== History ==
=== World War II ===
The squadron was originally formed as VJ-6M at Marine Corps Air Station Quantico, Virginia in 1922. Re-designation as VMJ-1 came on 1 July 1937, and again as VMJ-152 on 7 July 1941. VMJ-152 became the first Marine Corps squadron to field the new R4D-1 aircraft in the first part of 1942. The squadron subsequently moved to San Diego a few months later and shipped out to the South Pacific on 10 October 1942. The unit joined Marine Aircraft Group 25 on 25 October 1942, and immediately began flying missions in support of Marines engaged in the Battle of Guadalcanal.

In November 1942, the squadron became part of the joint-service South Pacific Combat Air Transport Command. Following this they made numerous supply drops during the New Georgia Campaign in 1943. The squadron was re-designated again to VMR-152 on 3 June 1944. During 1944, the squadron flew in support of operations on Bougainville and remained based there for the remainder of the war. From here the squadron also supported allied forces during the Philippines Campaign (1944–45) and the Battle of Okinawa. Following the surrender of Japan, the squadron flew in support of the 1st Marine Division during their occupation of Northern China from 1945 - 1947. Following their China duty the squadron returned to the United States where they were based at Marine Corps Air Station El Toro, California.

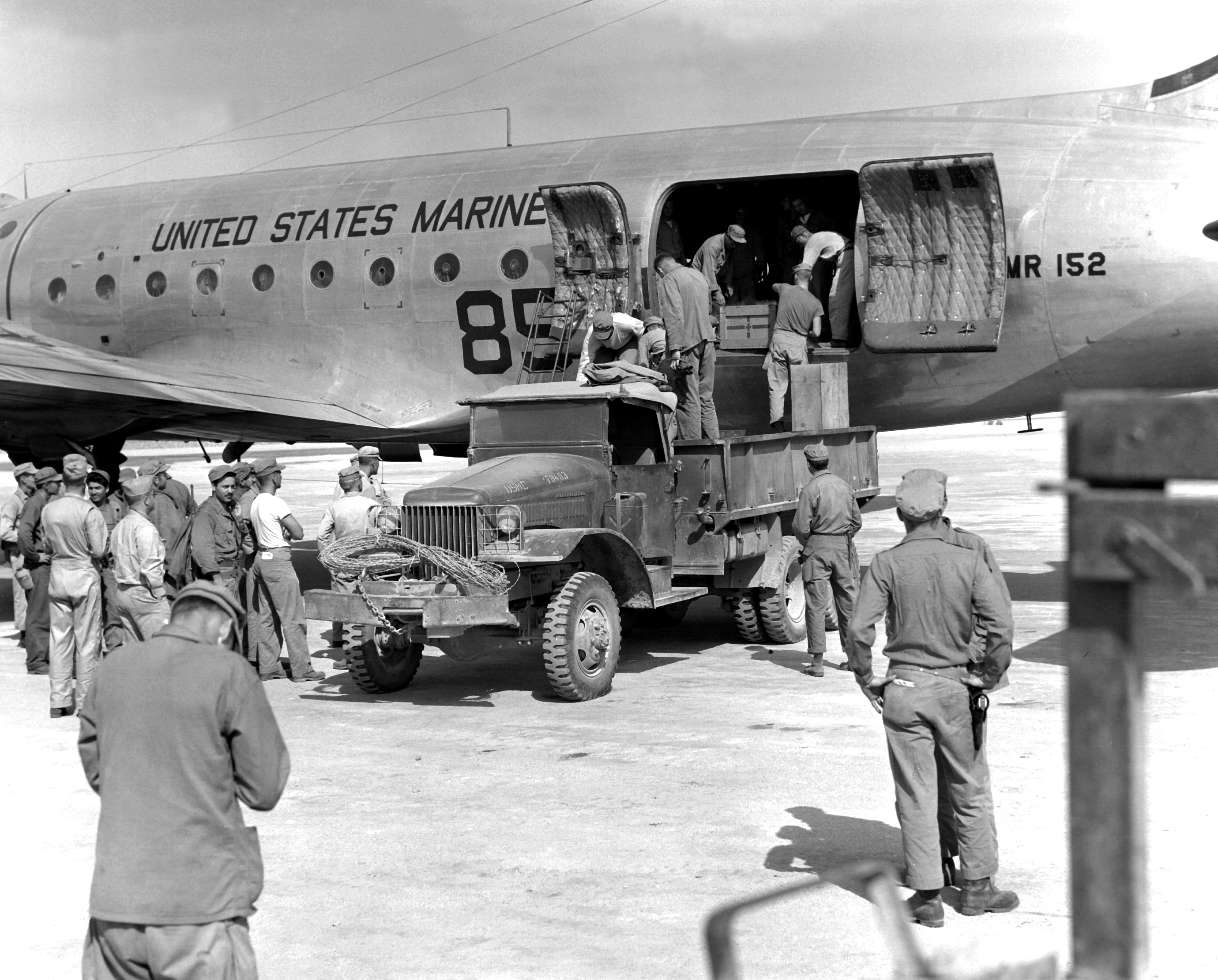
U.S. Marines unloading an VMR-152 R5D-2 at Chunchon, Korea, 1950.

=== Korean War & Decommissioning ===
VMR-152 was assigned to newly reactivated Marine Aircraft Group 25 in 1950, and provided an advance detachment that supported 1st Marine Division operations in Korea. During the war the squadron was based at Itami, Japan.

During the Battle of Chosin Reservoir, a four-engined R5D-2 transport, especially configured to carry a complete tactical air direction center (TADC), controlled all support aircraft as they reported on station, and assigned them to the various forward air controllers, as appropriate for the missions requested.

VMR-152 was decommissioned on 31 January 1959.

== See also ==
- United States Marine Corps Aviation
- List of active United States Marine Corps aircraft squadrons
- List of decommissioned United States Marine Corps aircraft squadrons
