= William K. Lanman =

American philanthropist

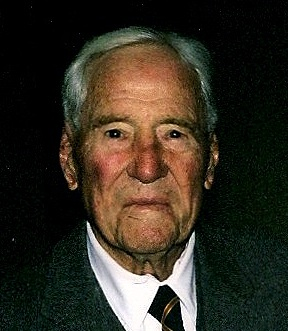
- William K. Lanman in 1999
- Born: William Kelsey Lanman Jr. October 9, 1904; Columbus, Ohio, U.S.
- Died: March 26, 2001 (aged 96)
- Education: Yale College
- Occupations: Naval Aviator and Investor

Colonel William Kelsey Lanman Jr., (October 9, 1904 – March 26, 2001) was an American philanthropist and benefactor of Yale University. He served as an aviator in the United States Marine Corps from 1935 to 1955, and later took up real estate and investment management.

== Early life ==
His father, William K. Lanman Sr., was chairman of the Columbus Bolt Company in Ohio. William K. Lanman Jr. graduated from Yale University in 1928 (B.S. from Sheffield Scientific School), as had his ancestor United States Senator James Lanman, who graduated from Yale College in 1788. Colonel Lanman's two brothers graduated from Yale College: Henry Reese Lanman in 1932, and Jonathan Trumbull Lanman in 1940 and from the Yale School of Medicine in 1943.

== Marine Corps career ==
Lanman was also a United States Naval Aviator, graduating from the Naval Aviation School in 1931. He served in the Pacific theater during World War II, with South Pacific Combat Air Transport Command (SCAT) where he was executive officer of the legendary World War II "Flying Boxcar" SCAT squadron. He received the Distinguished Flying Cross, four Air Medals, a Bronze Star and a U.S. Navy Commendation for action in the Solomon Islands campaigns. In 1949 he was commissioned Colonel.

== Yale benefactor ==
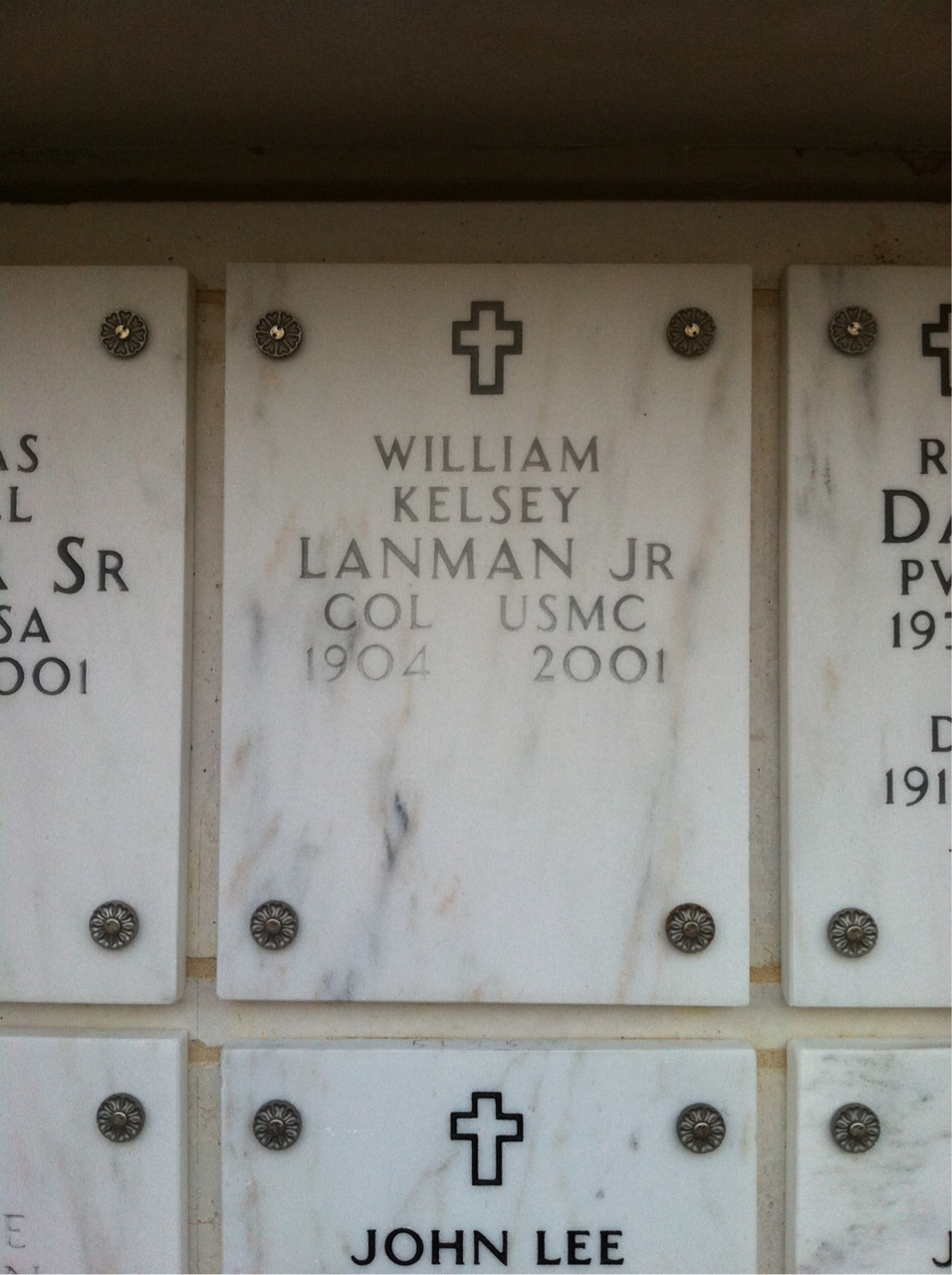
Grave at Arlington National Cemetery

Lanman made a series of major gifts to Yale, reported to total $40 million. He funded major renovation projects and endowed several chairs, in Economics, Sociology, Computer Science, International Studies, and Anthropology and International Affairs. In addition, Lanman was the major donor supporting the university's Tercentennial celebration in 2001. In 1974, he made a gift of John Trumbull's painting "Lady of the Lake, from Scott's The Lady of the Lake" c. 1811, to the Yale University Art Gallery. Lanman was awarded the Yale Medal in 1996.

Colonel Lanman died on March 26, 2001, the 300th anniversary year of the founding of Yale. He was survived by his sister, Harriet Lanman Fulton, and his friend, Isabel Pollen. Colonel Lanman was buried in Arlington National Cemetery.

Of interest, Lanman's childhood home at West Fifth and Roxbury Road in Columbus, Ohio was just around the corner from that of his friend, Prescott Sheldon Bush, who also attended Yale as did his son U. S. President George H. W. Bush and grandson, U. S. President George W. Bush.

== Commemoration at Yale ==
- Lanman-Wright Hall in Old Campus
- William K. Lanman Jr. Center at Payne Whitney Gymnasium
- William K. Lanman Jr. Professor of Computer Science and Mathematics
- William K. Lanman Jr. Professor of Economics
