= VMGR-152 =

Marine Aerial Refueler Transport Squadron 152
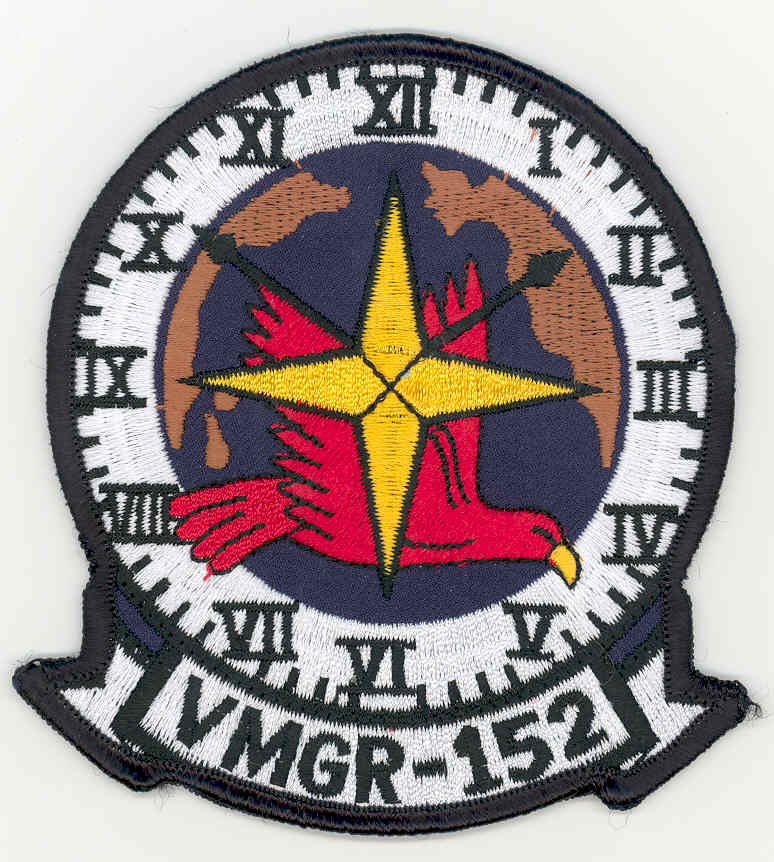
- VMGR-152 Insignia
- Active: 11 March 1942 - present
- Country: United States
- Allegiance: United States of America
- Branch: United States Marine Corps
- Type: Aerial Refuel / Cargo Transport
- Role: Assault support
- Part of: Marine Aircraft Group 12; 1st Marine Aircraft Wing
- Garrison/HQ: Marine Corps Air Station Iwakuni
- Nickname: "Sumos"
- Motto: "Ichi Go Ni"
- Tail Code: QD
- Mascot: "Tanuki" - Japanese Badger (Early 1960s)
- Engagements: World War II; Korean War; Vietnam War; Operation Desert Storm; Operation Enduring Freedom; Operation Iraqi Freedom

Commanders
- Current commander: LtCol Nathan H. Fluker

Marine Aerial Refueler Transport Squadron 152 (VMGR-152) provides aerial refueling service to support Fleet Marine Force (FMF) air operations; and provides assault air transport of personnel, equipment, and supplies. The squadron, known as the "Sumos", flies the fixed-wing Lockheed Martin KC-130J aircraft. VMGR-152 is stationed at Marine Corps Air Station Iwakuni, Iwakuni, Japan and is part of Marine Aircraft Group 12 (MAG-12) and the 1st Marine Aircraft Wing (1st MAW).

== Mission ==
Provide aerial refueling service in support of Fleet Marine Force Air Operations and provide assault air transport of personnel, equipment, and supplies.

=== Aerial refueling ===
VMGR-152 is capable of refueling helicopters, tilt-rotor and fixed-wing aircraft in support of tactical missions, training operations, or ferry flights. This is accomplished through the use of the two refueling pods mounted under the wings of its KC-130J aircraft, outboard of the engines. These pods trail a 93-foot hose attached to a stabilized paradrogue into which receiver aircraft plug.

=== Assault air transport ===
Assault air transport is the squadron's secondary mission. VMGR-152 can deliver supplies and troops by airdrop, or through assault landings on unimproved airstrips both during the day as well as at night, using night-vision devices.

== History ==
=== World War II ===
Marine Utility Squadron 253 "VMJ-253" was commissioned on 11 March 1942 in San Diego, California. The squadron's first cadre of pilots were airline pilots that were also in the Marine Corps Reserve. Soon after commissioning the squadron joined the joint air transport organization dubbed the South Pacific Combat Air Transport Command (SCAT). Lieutenant Colonel Perry K. Smith, USMC, became the first Commanding Officer of SCAT. By November 1942, VMJ-253 had supported operations on Guadalcanal and surrounding islands, logging thousands of flight hours.

While on Guadalcanal, VMJ-253 was the first combat transport squadron to land at Henderson Field, bringing Brigadier General Roy S. Geiger and his staff to take command of the 1st Marine Aircraft Wing. Following the Japanese counterattack that forced the United States Navy to withdraw, VMJ-253 continued to re-supply fuel, ammunition, food, and medical supplies in support of the besieged ground troops. The squadron's Douglas R4Ds delivered supplies despite being fired upon by Japanese troops lurking near Henderson Field and marauding A6M Zeros in the skies. Until the end of 1942, it was the Marines of VMJ-253 and other SCAT units that solved the logistical problems of Marines and soldiers on Guadalcanal.

Through 1943, VMJ-253 supported operations on Bougainville, New Georgia, Vella Lavella, and numerous islands throughout the Solomon chain. As the island-hopping campaign moved into the Central Pacific in 1944, so did VMJ-253. Detached from SCAT, VMJ-253 officially became a transport squadron and was redesignated VMR-253. VMR-253 was assigned to the Transport Air Group, popularly called TAG, which was the Central Pacific version of SCAT. Continuing the heavy schedule of lifts from Tarawa, VMR-253 sortied to Kwajalein, Roi-Namur, and Eniwetok. In October 1943, VMR-253 moved to Guam. Working out of Guam, VMR-253 supported actions on Tinian, Saipan, and Peleliu. VMR-253 remained on Guam until the close of the war, and in May 1946, returned to MCAS Miramar.

=== Post WW II / Korean War ===
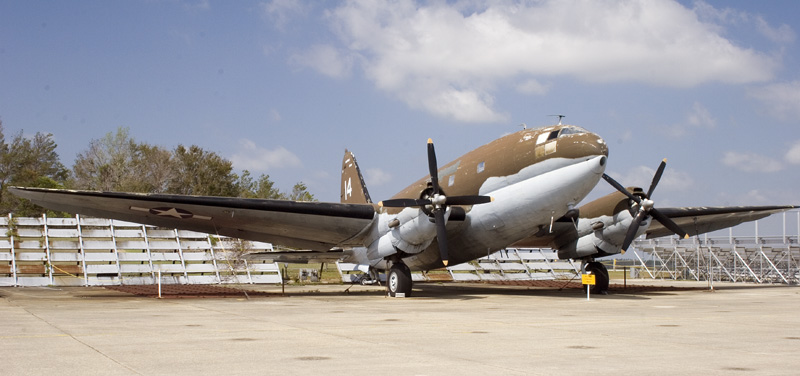
A former VMR-253 Curtiss R5C-1 at the National Museum of Naval Aviation

From Miramar, VMR-253 moved to MCAS El Toro under Marine Aircraft Group 25 where the aging fleet of R4Ds was replaced with Douglas R5Ds. VMR-253 continued its primary mission of moving men and supplies wherever the Marine Corps needed them. After a four-year squadron stand down from 1947 to 1951, VMR-253 reactivated for active duty in the Korean War; with only six Curtiss R5C aircraft, 5 officers and 18 enlisted Marines. By the end of the year it had grown to 58 officers and 184 enlisted men; had received 16 new Fairchild R4Qs; and was ready to go to war once again. From January 1952 through June 1953, the squadron logged over 11,000 flight hours, carried 30,170 passengers, and moved 5,213,383 pounds (2,364,751 kg) of cargo.

=== 1954 – 1965 ===
In 1954, the squadron relocated to Itami Air Force Base, Japan and then to Marine Corps Air Station Iwakuni, Japan. From Japan, VMR-253 conducted the bulk of Marine air transport in the Pacific for nearly ten years. On 1 February 1962, the famous Lockheed KC-130F Hercules joined Marine aviation in the Pacific. With its ability to refuel fighter and attack aircraft, VMR-253 was redesignated Marine Aerial Refueler Transport Squadron 152 (VMGR-152), and the squadron's primary mission became aerial refueling.

Less than a year after receiving the Hercules aircraft, the pilots and Marines of VMGR-152 were called upon to support United States Army advisors in the latest hot spot, Indo-China. This deployment gave the squadron valuable experience in the employment of the Battle Herc that would soon pay off. On 24 August 1965, a KC-130F (BuNo 149802) from the squadron veered off runway on take-off from Kai Tak Airport, Hong Kong hit the seawall and crashed into the sea. This was the first Hercules hull loss in Marine Corps service. It was carrying Marine personnel returning to Vietnam after R&R in Hong Kong; of six crew and 65 passengers, 59 were killed.

=== Vietnam era ===
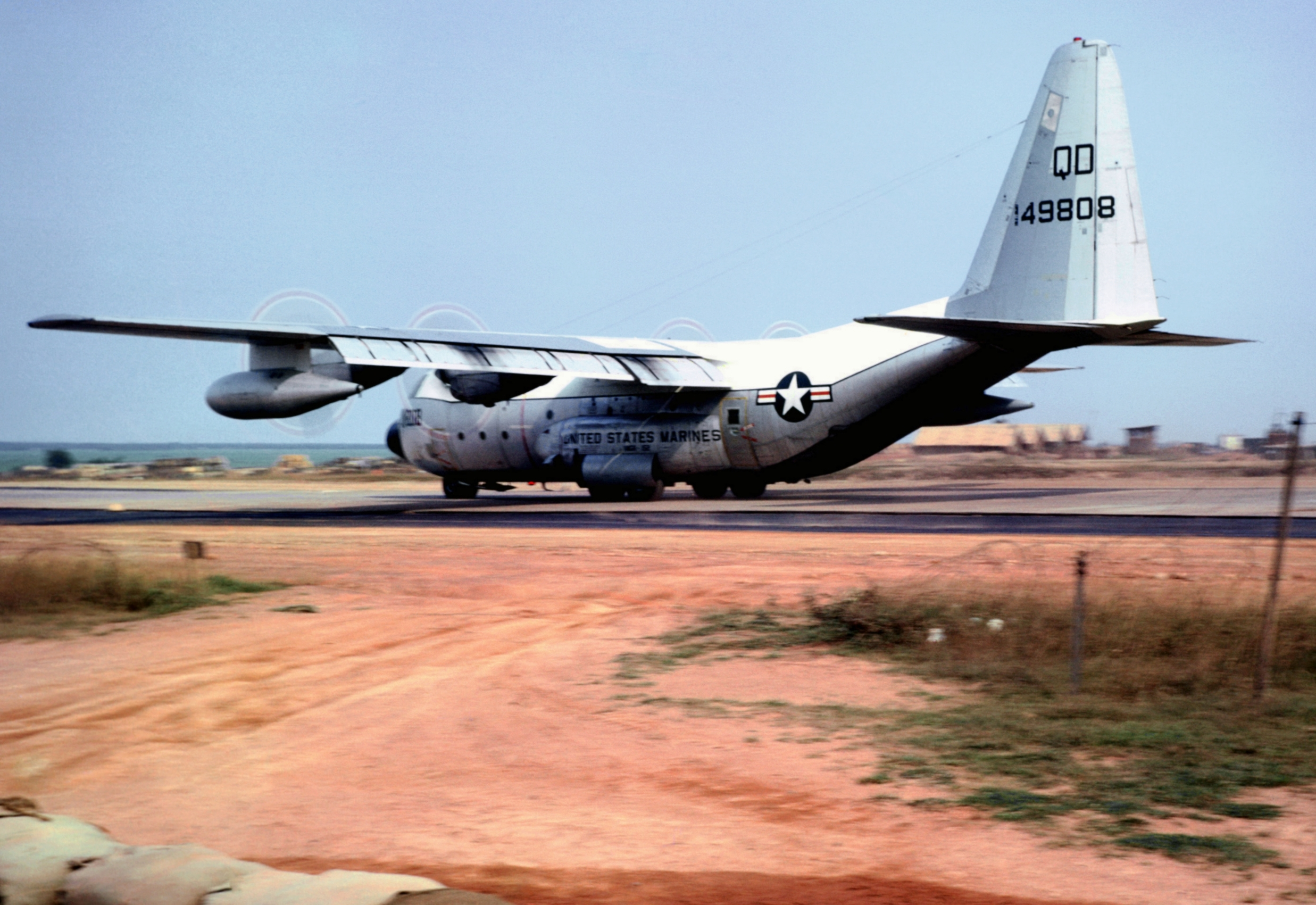
A VMGR-152 KC-130F landing at Dong Ha, in 1967

Beginning in 1965, with increasing U.S. involvement in Vietnam, detachments from VMGR-152 were deployed in country with Marine Amphibious Forces to support F-4s and A-4s used by Marine tactical squadrons. To better support the detachments in Vietnam, the squadron relocated to Okinawa, Japan.

From 1967 to 1975, the bulk of VMGR-152's missions were directly in support of action in Southeast Asia. Detachments typically lasted five days, and operated out of Da Nang Air Base. In addition to aerial refueling and Marine Logistic cargo missions, VMGR 152 'GVs' dropped flares in support of ground troop operations at night. At its peak, the squadron was flying 900 missions a month and continued this high tempo of operations well into 1967. On 10 February 1968 a VMGR-152 KC-130F was hit by groundfire during landing at Khe Sanh Combat Base, Quang Tri Province. The fuel bladders on board were set alight and the airframe burned out on the runway, with the loss of six on board.

Concurrent with the direct support of action in Vietnam, the squadron established itself as a mainstay in the Western Pacific. VMGR-152 conducted numerous trans-Pacific missions, which involved the refueling of entire squadrons of fighter and attack aircraft as they crossed the Pacific on deployment. VMGR-152 also participated in a myriad of exercises and the movement of tons of cargo and thousands of troops, securing VMGR-152's tenure in WESTPAC.

=== 1980s – 1990s ===
During the 1980s, larger United States Air Force tankers specifically designated for the strategic movement and refueling of aircraft relieved VMGR-152 of its TRANSPAC mission. This allowed the squadron to explore a more tactical employment of the KC-130 in intra-theater refueling and transport operations, and employ a more effective use of the aircraft and its personnel in a tactical environment. In 1987, VMGR-152 became the first PCS (permanent change of station) aircraft squadron on Marine Corps Air Station Futenma.

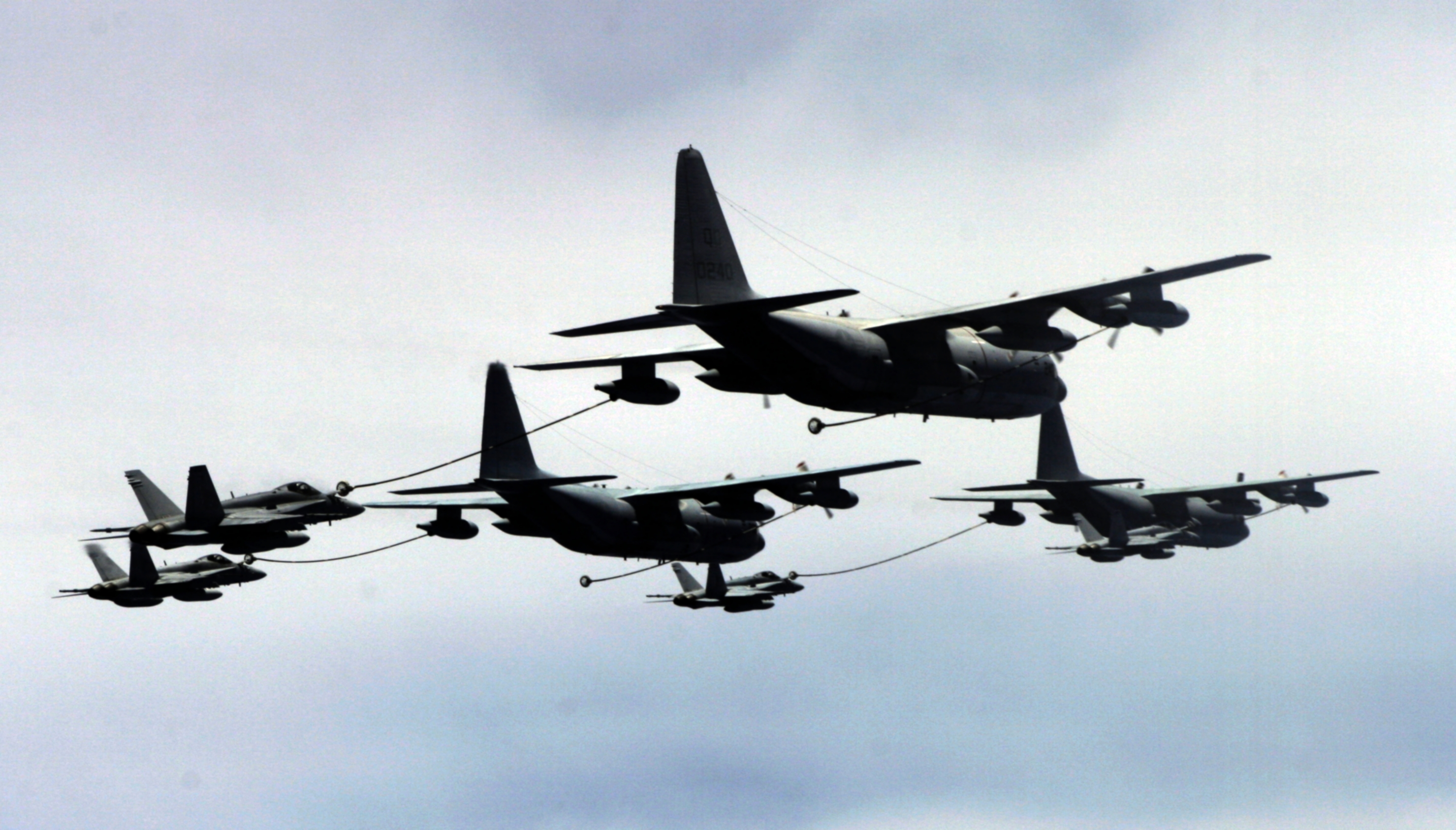
KC-130s from VMGR-152 refuel VFA-97 F/A-18Cs, in 2006

Since the early 1990s, VMGR-152 has experienced a steady increase in the number of missions flown. In June 1993, the squadron acquired five KC-130Rs, which provided the squadron with a significant increase in aircraft range and added to its effectiveness in refueling and transport operations.

In January 1995, VMGR-152 joined Special Purpose MAGTF in support of Operation United Shield, the final withdrawal of all UNOSOM forces from Somalia.

In May 2009, VMGR-152 joined Operation Enduring Freedom with the new KC-130J.

=== Recent significant operations ===
In November and December 2004, VMGR-152 participated in Joint Task Force 535, the Humanitarian Assistance/Disaster Relief mission in the Republic of the Philippines after several tropical storms and typhoons struck the island of Luzon. In the wake of the 26 December 2004 earthquake off the coast of Indonesia, and subsequent widespread tsunami in the Indian Ocean region, VMGR-152 deployed aircraft and personnel to Thailand, Sri Lanka, and Indonesia in support of Operation Unified Assistance.

In September 2006, VMGR-152 was awarded the Henry Wildfang Aerial Refueler/Transport Squadron of the Year award from the Marine Corps Aviation Association, which recognizes its impact on the community, as well as how well the squadron performs its mission and the types of missions it is involved in. Community work cited include not only the humanitarian missions throughout the Pacific, but also the work in the Okinawan community.

In May and June 2008 VMGR-152 operated relief flights in Myanmar to provide assistance in the wake of devastation left by Cyclone Nargis, a tropical storm that caused a reported 32,000 deaths. During this time the Sumos launched 312 sorties to total 481.8 hours and delivered 2,808,954 pounds (1,274,120 kg) of cargo.

The squadron took delivery of its first KC-130J Super Hercules on 4 June 2007 with the first operational flight of the new aircraft on 19 June. A second KC-130J was delivered in September that year.

In June 2008 the squadron participated in Exercise Pitch Black, which is a biennial military exercise hosted by the Royal Australian Air Force (RAAF) and based on RAAF Base Tindal. The aim of the exercise is to practice Offensive Counter Air and Defensive Counter Air combat, in a simulated war environment and consists of a "red team" and a "blue team". As a member of the "red team", the Sumos acted as the force multiplier of the exercise by providing Fixed Wing Aerial Refueling.

In May 2009 the squadron sent two KC-130Js as a detachment with VMGR-352 in support of Operation Enduring Freedom (OEF). It was the Sumos' first combat deployment since 1975 during the Vietnam War. A total of 40 VMGR-152 Marines deployed to Kandahar, Afghanistan to provide additional support in the War on Terror. In November VMGR-152 sent a second detachment to OEF.

In July 2010 a two-aircraft detachment departed for the country of Bangladesh carrying Marines from MWSS-171 and their equipment to support their mission in building schools for Bangladeshi children. VMGR-152's role in this mission resulted in carrying over 35,000 pounds (16,000 kg) of cargo and 42 passengers to the poverty stricken country. During October 2010, VMGR-152 flew relief operations in the Republic of the Philippines in the aftermath of Typhoon Megi. In December that year VMGR-152 completed its transition to the KC-130J.

After the Tōhoku earthquake and tsunami hit Japan on 11 March 2011, the squadron sent eight of its KC-130Js to Iwakuni for disaster relief and support for the Japanese Government and people in what became "Operation Tomodachi". The first crews left with less than a 24-hour notice and were not given an expected return date. In the month of April the squadron continued support for Operation Tomodachi. A three-aircraft detachment shifted to Atsugi, and most crews were moved back home to the squadron and based out of Futenma for the remaining support.

In July 2012 the final deployment of three crews, two aircraft and 40 maintenance Marines to Afghanistan returned after five weeks in theater because of operational draw downs. Their return marked the end of eight consecutive wartime deployments of VMGR-152 to OEF and the restoration of a 15-aircraft fleet now available for future operational commitments tasked to the Sumos throughout the Pacific Command. Since summer of 2012, VMGR-152 has been involved in exercises and operations throughout all of its Area of Responsibility and beyond to include Hawaii, Alaska, Australia, Thailand, Nepal, and Mongolia.

In July 2014, VMGR-152 completed a permanent change of station from MCAS Futenma back to MCAS Iwakuni for the first time since 1987. The squadron was the first to move from Futenma as the Marine Corps begins to turn the airfield over to the Japanese. With the move VMGR-152 takes its place as only the second PCS squadron aboard MCAS Iwakuni, joining Marine All Weather Fighter Attack Squadron 242 (VMFA-242).

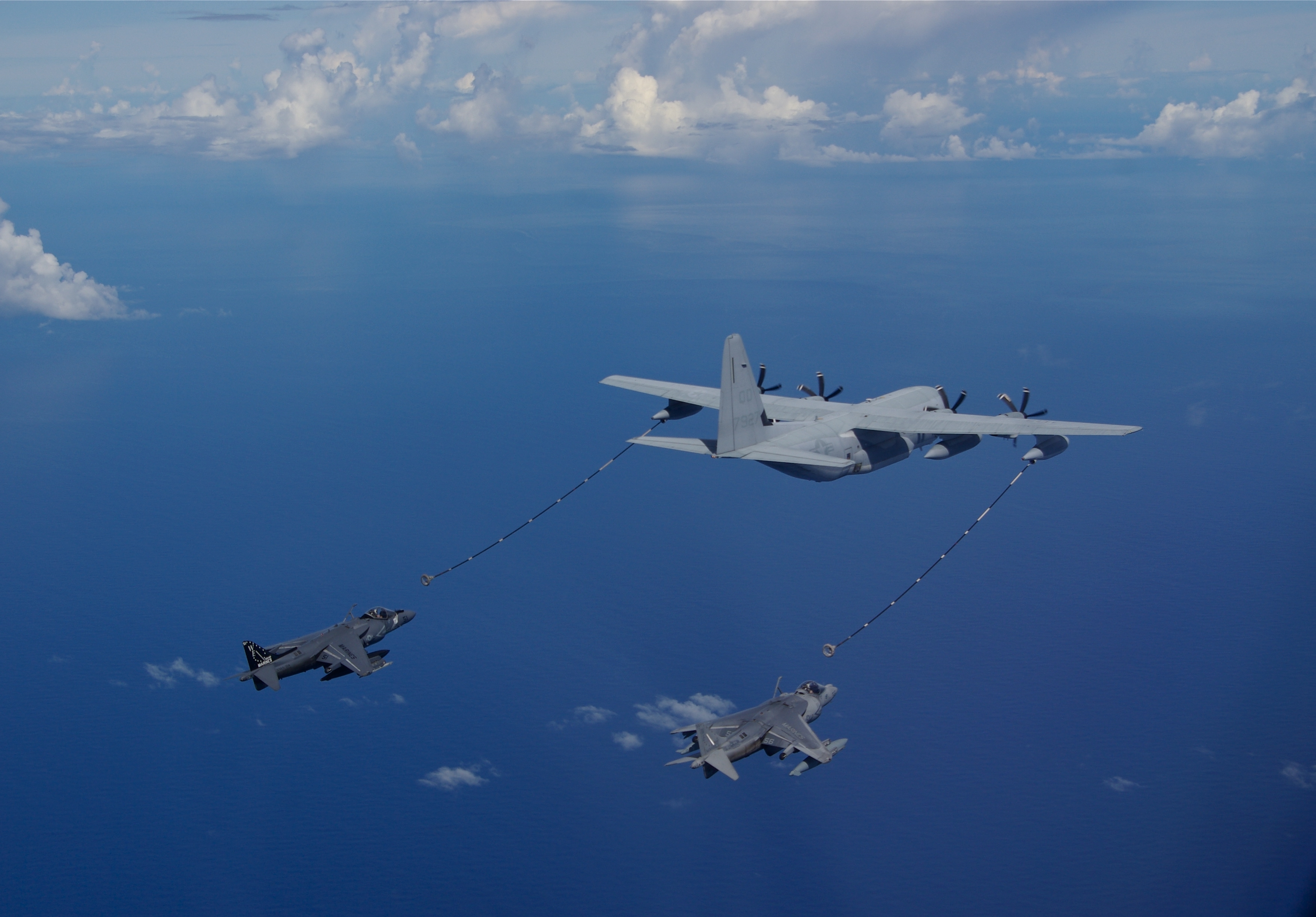
Sumos conducting Aerial Refueling with two AV-8B Harriers

== Awards and Safety ==
VMJ-253 was awarded the Distinguished Unit Citation as part of the 1st Marine Division (Reinforced) for the Guadalcanal Campaign. The squadron also received a Navy Unit Commendation for its operations as part of SCAT from December 1942 to July 1944.

VMGR-152's commitment to safety and maintaining readiness levels have earned the squadron numerous unit citations and awards. These include the CNO Aviation Safety Award for 1992, 1993, 1998, 1999, 2000, 2001, 2003, 2004, and 2005, the MCAA Commandant's Aviation Efficiency Trophy for 1992, 1993, 2011 and 2013 and the National Defense Transportation Unit Award for 1993, 1995, and 2000, and the MCAA Marine Aerial Refueler Transport Squadron of the Year Award (Henry Wildfang Award) for 1994, 2001, and 2005.

On 16 July 2001, the Sumos of VMGR-152 exceeded 230,000 mishap free flight hours. In July 2005, the Sumos exceeded 250,000 mishap-free flight hours.

== See also ==
- United States Marine Corps Aviation
- List of active United States Marine Corps aircraft squadrons
- List of inactive United States Marine Corps aircraft squadrons
