= South Pacific Combat Air Transport Command =

- Active: November 1942 – July 1944
- Country: United States
- Type: Transport
- Role: Assault support
- Nickname(s): SCAT; Flying Boxcars
- Engagements: World War II * Guadalcanal Campaign * New Georgia Campaign * Battle of Vella Lavella * Bougainville Campaign
- Decorations: Distinguished Unit Citation Navy Unit Commendation

South Pacific Combat Air Transport Command (SCAT) was a joint command of U.S. military logistics units in the Pacific Ocean theater of World War II. It contributed notably to the success of U.S. forces in the campaigns on Guadalcanal (1942–1943), New Georgia (1943), and Bougainville (1943–1945), as well as the Allied air campaign against Rabaul.

== History ==
The organization of SCAT was a response to developments on Guadalcanal, following the initial deployment of Marine Aircraft Group 25 in September 1942, comprising the United States Marine Corps transport squadron VMJ-253 and Headquarters Squadron MAG-25, which were joined by the 13th Troop Carrier Squadron, United States Army Air Forces (USAAF). SCAT was formally organized around MAG-25 in late November 1942 at the direction of Vice Admiral Aubrey Fitch, and by the end of the Guadalcanal campaign it included VMJ-152 and SMS-25 of the Marine Corps and the USAAF 801st Medical Air Evacuation Squadron. In 1943 SCAT was joined by VMJ-153 and the USAAF 403rd Troop Carrier Group (including the 64th Troop Carrier Squadron and 63rd Troop Carrier Squadron).

SCAT provided rapid transport of personnel and cargo, including munitions, food, replacement parts, and medical supplies, to and from forward areas. On rearward flights SCAT frequently provided aeromedical evacuation of wounded or sick personnel. Aircraft typically included a flight nurse, corpsman, or flight surgeon as part of the crew. SCAT was dissolved as its Army Air Forces troop carrier units departed in July 1944, although the Marines adopted the organizational title Solomons Combat Air Transport Command and continued to utilize the "SCAT" acronym.

MAG-25, including the attached 13th Troop Carrier Squadron, was awarded the Distinguished Unit Citation as part of the 1st Marine Division (Reinforced) for the Guadalcanal campaign. SCAT received a Navy Unit Commendation for its operations in the South Pacific from December 1942 to July 1944.

The nickname "Flying Boxcars" was widely used for the Douglas R4D aircraft flown by Marine Corps units in SCAT, predating its attachment to the post-war Fairchild C-119 Flying Boxcar (R4Q) aircraft.

== Personnel ==
Notable persons who had been associated with SCAT include:

- Richard Nixon, 37th President of the United States, who served as officer-in-charge of SCAT forward detachments at Bougainville and Green Island while assigned to Headquarters Squadron-25.
- David Douglas Duncan, photographer, who covered SCAT while assigned to VMD-154.
- William K. Lanman, executive officer of VMJ-153 and then MAG-25, who became a millionaire benefactor of Yale University.

== See also ==
- List of inactive United States Marine Corps aircraft squadrons
- United States Marine Corps Aviation
