= 913th Air Refueling Squadron =

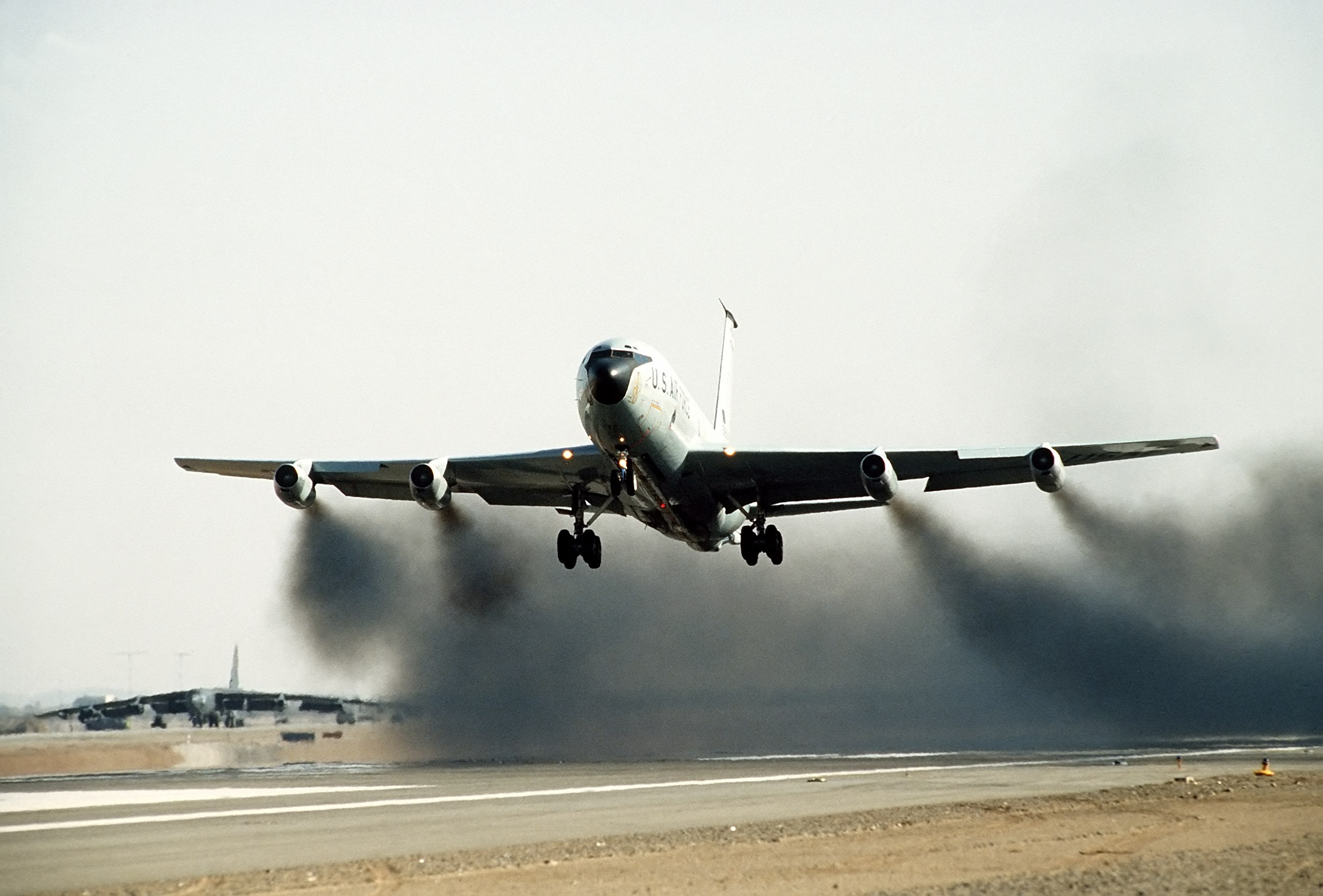
- Boeing KC-135 on takeoff using water injection to increase thrust
- Active: 1940–1946; 1958–1981
- Country: United States
- Branch: United States Air Force
- Role: Air refueling
- Nickname: The Thirsty Thirteenth (World War II)
- Engagements: Battle of Guadalcanal; Battle of New Georgia; Battle of Vella Lavella; Battle of Bougainville; South West Pacific Theater of World War II; Philippines Campaign (1944-1945)
- Decorations: Distinguished Unit Citation; Air Force Outstanding Unit Award; Navy Unit Commendation; Philippine Republic Presidential Unit Citation

Insignia
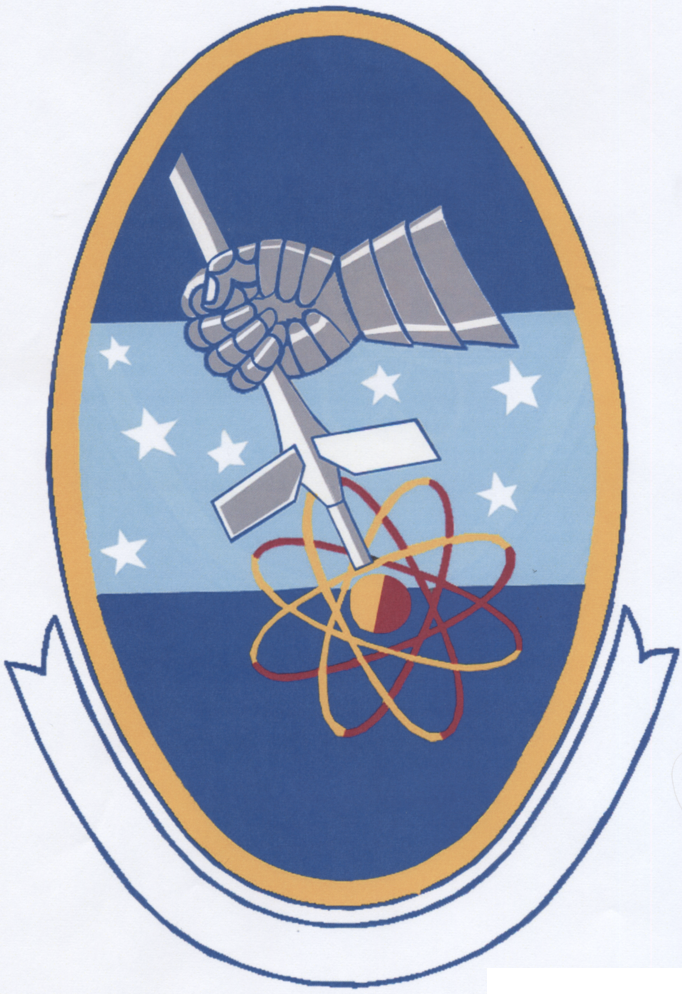
- 913th Air Refueling Squadron Emblem

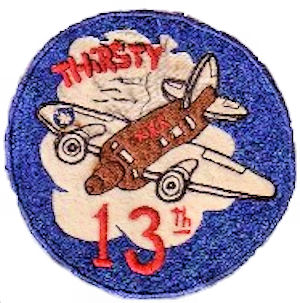
- 13th Troop Carrier Squadron patch

The first predecessor of the squadron was organized in 1940 as the 13th Transport Squadron. During World War II, as the 13th Troop Carrier Squadron, the squadron served in the South West Pacific Theater of World War II, earning two Distinguished Unit Citations, a Navy Unit Commendation and a Philippine Republic Presidential Unit Citation for its wartime actions. Its last assignment was with the 403d Troop Carrier Group at Nichols Field, Luzon, Philippines, where it was inactivated on 15 October 1946.

The 913th Air Refueling Squadron was activated by the United States Air Force in 1958 at Barksdale Air Force Base, Louisiana, where it was last assigned to the 2d Bombardment Wing. The squadron responded to the Cuban Missile Crisis and provided Boeing KC-135 Stratotanker aircraft and aircrews to support the Viet Nam War. It was inactivated on 1 November 1981 and replaced by a squadron flying McDonnell Douglas KC-10 Extenders.

The two squadrons were consolidated in September 1985 but the consolidated squadron has not been active since.

== History ==
=== World War II ===
The 13th Transport Squadron was activated in late 1940 as one of the three original squadrons of the 61st Transport Group. Personnel for the squadron were drawn from the 5th Transport Squadron, located at Patterson Field, Ohio.

The headquarters and squadrons of the 61st were initially scattered at various depot bases, with the 13th at Patterson Field, site of the Fairfield Air Depot. The 61st was finally united with its component squadrons at Pope Field, North Carolina in May 1942. Shortly after this the group and squadrons were renamed Troop Carrier organizations. The squadron trained with the group in the southeast, using Douglas C-47 Skytrain and Douglas C-53 Skytrooper aircraft, but in the fall of 1942 the 13th deployed by itself to the Pacific.

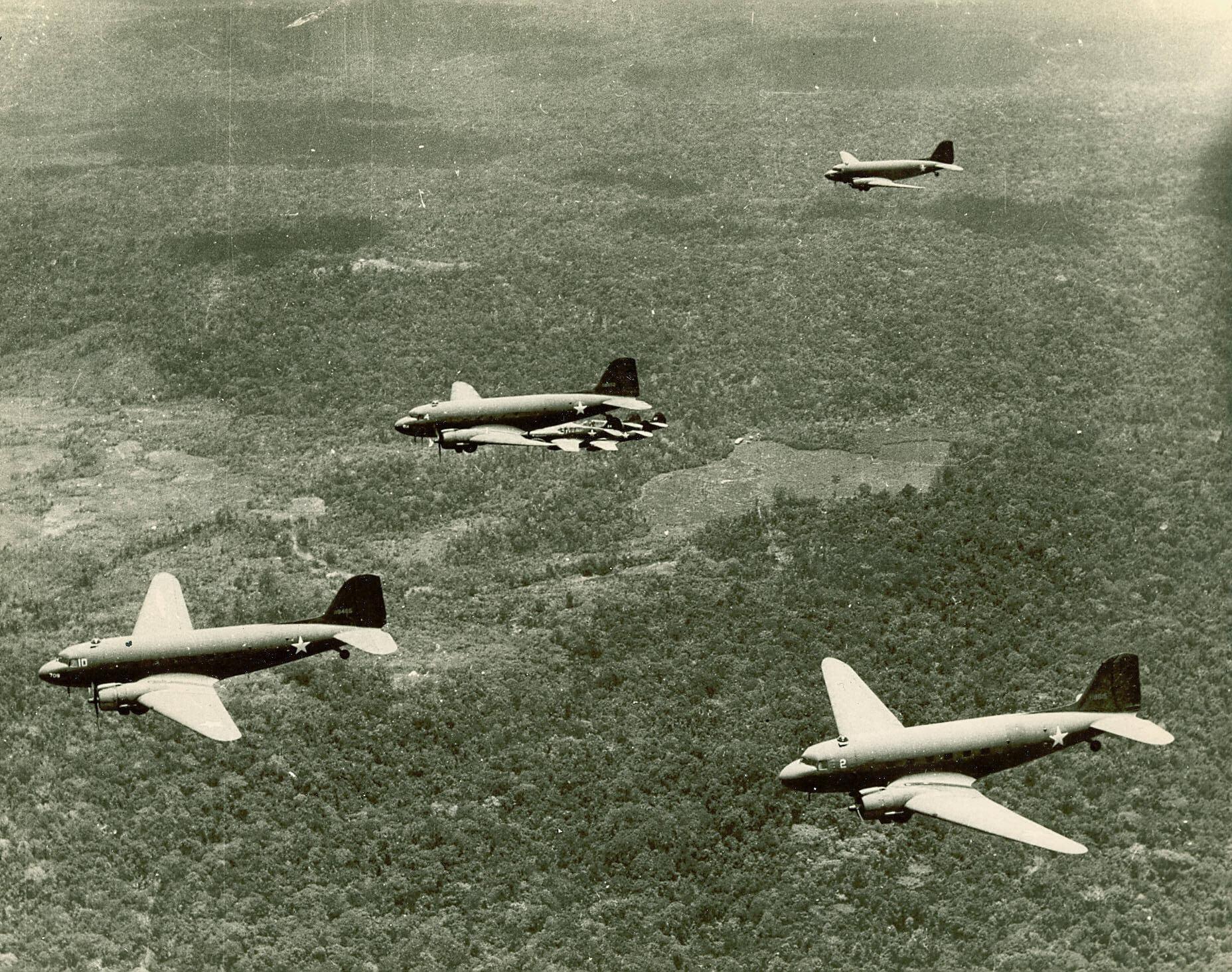
C-47s flying supplies to a forward airfield in New Guinea escorted by P-40s

Upon arrival in the theater, the squadron, operating from bases in New Caledonia, was attached to Marine Air Group 25 and began to transport vital ammunition and supplies to Guadalcanal and to evacuate wounded personnel on return trips. In November 1942 the squadron became part of the South Pacific Combat Air Transport Command (SCAT). For its actions during the Guadalcanal Campaign the squadron earned its first Distinguished Unit Citation.

In August 1943 the squadron was assigned to the 403d Troop Carrier Group and then moved to Espiritu Santo. It supported the New Guinea and Philippines campaigns by transporting men and cargo to combat areas. The 13th evacuated casualties and dropped or airlanded supplies to guerrilla forces in the Philippines. On 23 February 1945 the squadron dropped paratroopers into Laguna de Bay, Luzon to free civilians held prisoner by the Japanese. The unit moved to the Philippines in 1945 and remained after the Japanese surrender as part of Far East Air Forces. It flew occupation troops to Japan, evacuated prisoners of war and flew cargo and personnel between Australia and Japan. In early 1946 the squadron began to transition into Douglas C-54 Skymasters.

In October 1946 the 403d Troop Carrier Group was replaced by the 374th Troop Carrier Group. As a result, the 13th was inactivated and its mission, personnel and equipment were transferred to the 22d Troop Carrier Squadron.

=== Cold War ===
The 913th Air Refueling Squadron was activated in June 1958 by Strategic Air Command (SAC) at Barksdale Air Force Base, Louisiana. The squadron was equipped with Boeing KC-135 Stratotankers and assigned to the 4238th Strategic Wing as part of SAC's plan to disperse its Boeing B-52 Stratofortress units to make it more difficult for the Soviet Union to destroy the entire fleet with a first strike. The squadron mission was to provide air refueling to the B-52s of its parent wing and other USAF units as directed. Starting in 1960, one third of the squadron's aircraft were maintained on fifteen-minute alert, fully fueled and ready for combat to reduce vulnerability to a Soviet missile strike. This was increased to half the squadron's aircraft in 1962. The squadron trained for this mission until inactivation except for periods when its aircraft and crews were deployed with other SAC organizations conducting combat operations.

From October through November 1962 the squadron's training was interrupted as it assumed an increased alert posture during the Cuban Missile Crisis. After tensions eased, the unit resumed normal operations. The 913th transferred to the 2d Bombardment Wing in 1963 when SAC replaced its parent wing with an organization that had a more distinguished history and could continue its lineage. (Note: MAJCON units like the 4138th could not carry a permanent history or lineage. Ravenstein. Guide to Air Force Lineage, p. 12.)

In 1962, SAC established an airborne command post at Offutt Air Force Base, Nebraska, nicknamed Looking Glass, to ensure continuity of command and control of SAC forces in the event of a nuclear attack. Looking Glass was soon augmented by auxiliary aircraft stationed with the headquarters of SAC's three Numbered Air Forces. The 913th received Boeing EC-135C aircraft to operate SAC's Central Auxiliary Command Post's airborne element. The 913th continued to operate PACCS aircraft until 1 April 1970, when SAC reorganized its airborne command post aircraft and withdrew them from vulnerable bases near the coasts like Barksdale and assigned them to the 2d, 3d, and 4th Airborne Command and Control Squadrons, stationed at bases closer to the heartland of North America.

The 913th began supporting SAC operations in Southeast Asia in 1965, and increased its support of these operations over the following two years. From May to November 1972 all but four of the squadron's KC-135s and a handful of crews were on loan to other SAC units. Following the return of its assets, the squadron continued to support operations in Southeast Asia until 1975. The 913th resumed its training and alert mission until it was inactivated in 1981 and replaced by the 32d Air Refueling Squadron when the 2d Bombardment Wing began to operate McDonnell Douglas KC-10 Extenders.

The 13th Troop Carrier Squadron was consolidated with the 913th Air Refueling Squadron in September 1985 but the consolidated squadron has not been active since.

== Lineage ==
13th Troop Carrier Squadron

- Constituted as the 13th Transport Squadron on 20 November 1940

Activated on 1 December 1940
Redesignated the 13th Troop Carrier Squadron on 4 July 1942
Inactivated on 15 October 1946

- Consolidated with 913th Air Refueling Squadron as the 913th Air Refueling Squadron on 19 September 1985

913th Air Refueling Squadron

- Constituted as the 913th Air Refueling Squadron, Heavy on 7 April 1958

Activated on 1 June 1958
Inactivated on 1 November 1981

- Consolidated with 13th Troop Carrier Squadron on 19 September 1985 (remained inactive)

=== Assignments ===
- 61st Transport Group (later 61st Troop Carrier Group), 1 December 1940
- Army Forces in South Pacific Area, c. 10 October 1942 (attached to South Pacific Combat Air Transport Command, 11 December 1942 – 3 July 1944)
- Thirteenth Air Force, c. 13 January 1943
- XIII Air Force Service Command, 1 July 1943
- 403d Troop Carrier Group, 22 August 1943 – 15 October 1946
- 4238th Strategic Wing, 1 June 1958
- 2d Bombardment Wing, 1 April 1963 – 1 November 1981

=== Stations ===
- Patterson Field, Ohio, 1 December 1940
- Drew Field, Florida, 13 July 1941
- Pope Field, North Carolina, 25 May 1942
- Lockbourne Army Air Base, Ohio, 8 August-22 September 1942
- Plaine Des Gaiacs Airfield, New Caledonia, 10 October 1942
- Tontouta Airfield, New Caledonia, 17 December 1942
- Luganville Airfield, Espiritu Santo, New Hebrides, 2 November 1943

Operated from Los Negros Island, Admiralty Islands, 16 August-4 October 1944

- Mokmer Airfield, Biak, Netherlands East Indies, 21 September 1944

Operated from Wakde Airfield, Wakde, Netherlands East Indies, 4–19 October 1944

- Dulag Airfield, Dulag, Leyte, Philippines, 17 July 1945
- Clark Field, Luzon, Philippines, 7 January 1946
- Nichols Field, Luzon, Philippines, 15 June 1946 – 15 October 1946
- Barksdale Air Force Base, Louisiana, 1 June 1958 – 1 November 1981

=== Aircraft ===
- Douglas C-47 Skytrain, 1941–1946
- Douglas C-53 Skytrooper, 1942
- Curtiss C-46 Commando, 1945–1946
- Douglas C-54 Skymaster, 1946
- Boeing KC-135 Stratotanker, 1958–1981
- Boeing EC-135C, c. 1964–1970

=== Awards and campaigns ===
Award streamer	Award	Dates	Notes
	Distinguished Unit Citation	10 October 1942 – 9 December 1942	13th Troop Carrier Squadron
	Distinguished Unit Citation	17 April 1945 – 30 June 1945	13th Troop Carrier Squadron
	Air Force Outstanding Unit Award	1 July 1965 – 1 December 1965	913th Air Refueling Squadron
	Navy Unit Commendation	11 December 1942 – 15 July 1944	13th Troop Carrier Squadron
	Philippine Republic Presidential Unit Citation	17 October 1944 – 4 July 1945	13th Troop Carrier Squadron

Campaign Streamer	Campaign	Dates	Notes
	Guadalcanal	10 October 1942 – 21 February 1943	13th Troop Carrier Squadron
	New Guinea	24 January 1943 – 31 December 1944	13th Troop Carrier Squadron
	Northern Solomons	23 February 1943 – 21 November 1944	13th Troop Carrier Squadron
	Bismarck Archipelago	15 December 1943 – 27 November 1944	13th Troop Carrier Squadron
	Western Pacific	17 April 1944 – 2 September 1945	13th Troop Carrier Squadron
	Leyte	17 October 1944 – 1 July 1945	13th Troop Carrier Squadron
	Luzon	15 December 1944 – 4 July 1945	13th Troop Carrier Squadron
	Southern Philippines	27 February 1945 – 4 July 1945	13th Troop Carrier Squadron

== See also ==
- List of C-47 Skytrain operators
- List of MAJCOM wings of the United States Air Force
- List of United States Air Force air refueling squadrons
