= Marine Aircraft Group 93 =

- Active: 1 April 1944 – October 1945
- Country: United States
- Allegiance: United States of America
- Branch: United States Marine Corps
- Role: Training
- Part of: Deactivated

Marine Aircraft Group 93 (MAG-93) was a United States Marine Corps aviation group established during World War II. MAG-93, a dive bombing training group, was commissioned on 1 April 1944 and was initially headquartered at Marine Corps Auxiliary Airfield Bogue, North Carolina. Their mission was to train pilots to fly the Curtiss SB2C Helldiver. The group was decommissioned in October 1945 as part of the post-war drawdown of forces and has been inactive since.

== Subordinate units ==
- Marine Service Squadron-93 (SMS-93)
- VMSB-333
- VMSB-334
- VMSB-342
- VMO-351 – joined group on 10 May 1944
- VMSB-932 – commissioned on 15 May 1944

== History ==
=== World War II ===
Marine Aircraft Group 93 was commissioned on 1 April 1944 at Marine Corps Auxiliary Airfield Bogue, North Carolina. In July 1944, the group's mission changed to that of organizing and training replacement personnel for combat. A month later, in August 1944, the group moved to Marine Corps Air Station Eagle Mountain Lake, Texas and took control of the squadrons that formally belonged to Marine Aircraft Group 33 as it departed for duty in the Pacific Theater. The group remained in this role for the remainder of the war. Following the surrender of Japan, the group was deactivated in October 1945.

== See also ==
- United States Marine Corps Aviation
- List of United States Marine Corps aircraft groups
