= VMF-155 =

Marine Fighting Squadron 155
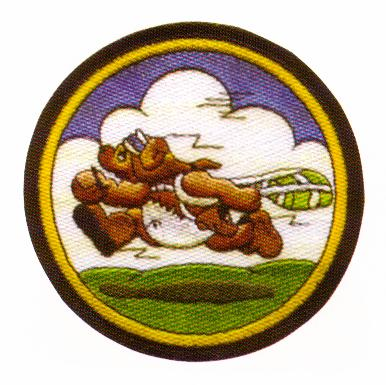
- VMF-155 Insignia
- Active: 1 October 1942 – 15 October 1945
- Country: United States
- Allegiance: United States of America
- Branch: United States Marine Corps
- Type: Fighter squadron
- Role: Photographic reconnaissance
- Part of: Marine Aircraft Group 13
- Garrison/HQ: Inactive
- Nickname: Ready Teddy
- Engagements: World War II

Marine Fighting Squadron 155 (VMF-155) was a fighter squadron of the United States Marine Corps in World War II. During the war, they flew the SBC Helldiver and, after reconstitution in 1943, the F4F Wildcat. Later in the War the squadron also flew the F4U Corsair. One of the squadron's pilots who went on to great distinction later in his career was Lieutenant John Glenn. The squadron, also known as "Ready Teddy", was deactivated shortly after the war and is still inactive.

== History ==
Marine Observation Squadron 155 (VMO-155) was activated on 1 October 1942, as part of Marine Aircraft Group 13. The squadron was initially based in American Samoa and its first personnel came from VMSB-151. Their first complement of aircraft were SBC Helldiver biplane dive bomber and the J2F-5 Duck amphibious biplane. In December 1942, the bulk of the squadrons personnel were sent to Guadalcanal where they were assigned as replacements. A small cadre of six officers and fifteen enlisted men were retained in the squadron and ordered to Camp Kearny in San Diego, California to re-equip and train.

Beginning in January 1943, VMO-155 began training on the F4F-3P Wildcat, a fighter specifically designed for photographic reconnaissance. During this time they also began receiving their carrier qualifications. In April 1943, with their training complete, a detachment from the squadron was ordered aboard the USS Nassau (CVE-16) to participate in the invasion of Attu in the Aleutian Islands. This operation made them the first Marine squadron to operate from an aircraft carrier during World War II and the only Marine squadron to operate in the North Pacific. Following the Operation in the Aleutians, the detachment rejoined the squadron in June 1943 and quickly moved to Marine Corps Air Station El Centro for further training. In February 1944, VMO-155 moved to Midway Atoll and became part of the local garrison. After four months on Midway, they were sent to Marine Corps Air Station Ewa, Hawaii. From MCAS Ewa, the squadron was again split up. This time the ground echelon was sent to Kwajalein and the flight echelon went to Roi. From these locations, for the rest of the war, the squadron took part in strikes against the Marshall Islands.

On 31 January 1945, VMO-155 was redesignated Marine Fighting Squadron 155 (VMF-155). The squadron was deactivated on 15 October 1945, shortly after the cessation of hostilities with Japan.

== See also ==
- United States Marine Corps Aviation
- List of active United States Marine Corps aircraft squadrons
- List of inactive United States Marine Corps aircraft squadrons
