= VMP-254 =

Marine Photographic Squadron 254
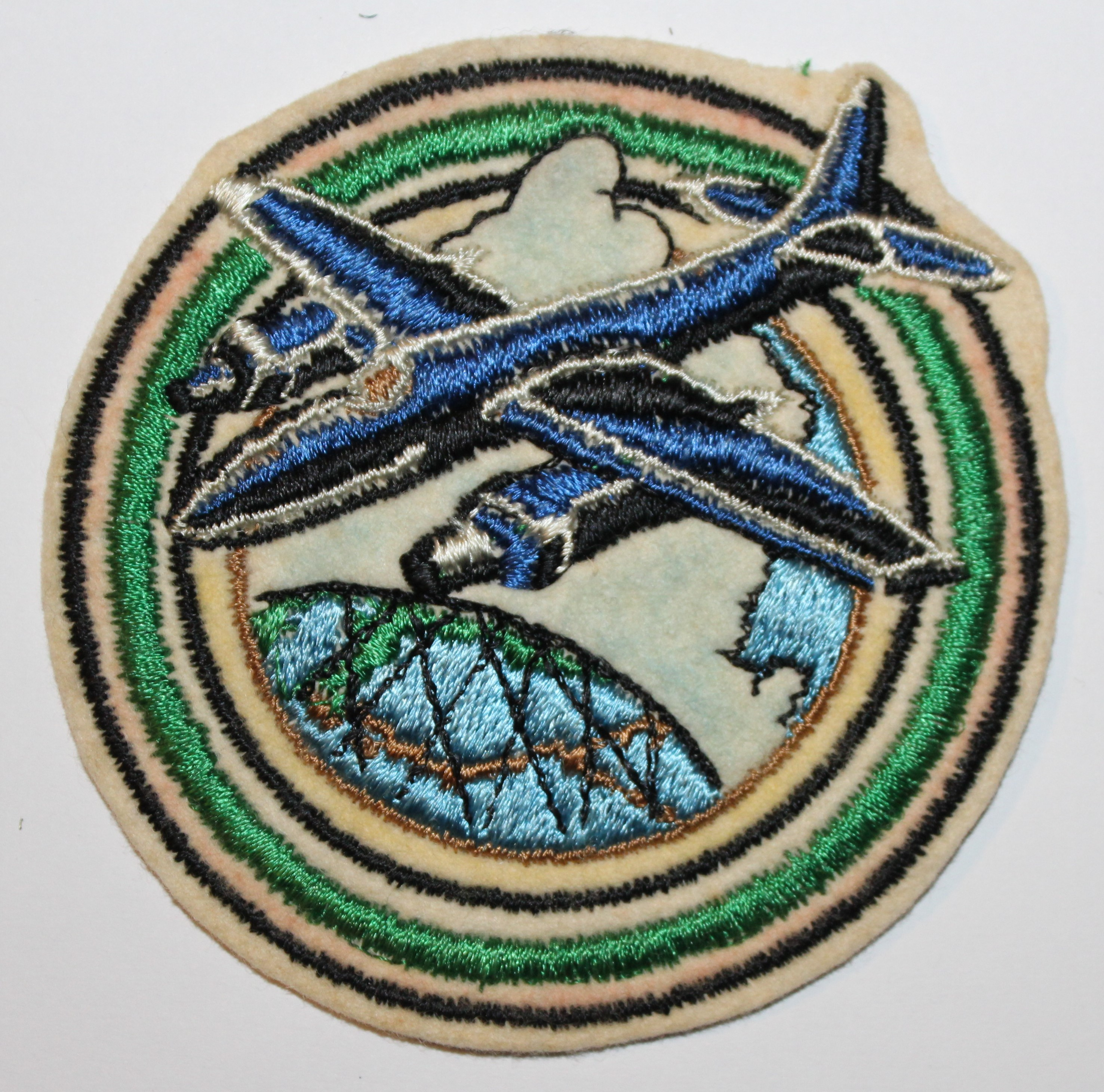
- VMP-254 Insignia
- Active: Sep 25, 1944 - Nov 30, 1949
- Country: United States
- Allegiance: United States of America
- Branch: United States Marine Corps
- Type: Aerial Reconnaissance
- Part of: N/A
- Tail Code: WT

Aircraft flown
- Reconnaissance: F6F-3P Hellcat; Grumman F7F Tigercat

Marine Photographic Squadron 254 (VMP-254) was a United States Marine Corps photographic reconnaissance squadron that was originally commissioned during World War II as a replacement training unit. In 1944 the squadron transitioned to the Fleet Marine Force and eventually deployed overseas in August 1945. During the war, the squadron flew the F6F-3P Hellcat and later transitioned to the Grumman F7F Tigercat. VMP-254 was decommissioned on November 30, 1949. Since that date, no other Marine Corps squadron has carried the lineage and honors of VMP-254.

== History ==
Marine Photographic Squadron 954 (VMD-954) was commissioned on September 25, 1944, at Marine Corps Air Station Cherry Point, North Carolina. The squadron was originally formed to serve as a replacement training squadron. On November 1, 1944, the squadron moved to Marine Corps Auxiliary Airfield Kinston to continue training. On March 28, 1945, the squadron was re-designated as VMD-254 and placed on an operational status to begin preparing for deployment overseas.

The first echelon of the squadron departed MCAAF Kinston on July 22, 1945, headed for Marine Corps Air Depot Miramar. This first echelon was aboard the USS Appling when the Japanese surrendered. The remainder of the squadron was still at MCAD Miramar.

Following the surrender of Japan, the squadron remained on Guam until February 1946 when it returned to Marine Corps Air Station El Toro, California. During the squadron's time at MCAS EL Toro it undertook the mission of large scale photographic mapping of Southern California. VMP-254 was decommissioned on November 30, 1949, at MCAS El Toro. Marine Corps Aviation was dramatically downsized after World War II and leadership decided to decommission the photographic and electronic counter-measure squadrons in order to retain fighter and attack squadrons. A portion of the squadron's personnel and equipment were transferred to the 1st Marine Aircraft Wing's Headquarters to form a smaller photo section.

== Unit awards ==
A unit citation or commendation is an award bestowed upon an organization for the action cited. Members of the unit who participated in said actions are allowed to wear on their uniforms the awarded unit citation. VMP-254 has been presented with the following awards:

Streamer	Award	Year(s)	Additional Info
	World War II Victory Streamer	1941–1945	Pacific War

== See also ==
- United States Marine Corps Aviation
- List of active United States Marine Corps aircraft squadrons
- List of decommissioned United States Marine Corps aircraft squadrons
