= VMA-236 =

Marine Attack Squadron 236
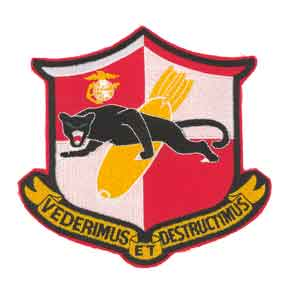
- VMSB-236's WWII insignia
- Active: 1 Jan 1943 – 1 Aug 1945; 28 Feb 1947 - Late 1960s
- Country: United States
- Allegiance: United States of America
- Branch: United States Marine Corps
- Type: Attack Squadron
- Role: Close air support Air interdiction
- Part of: Inactive
- Nickname(s): Back Panthers
- Tail Code: 7P
- Engagements: World War II * Bougainville Campaign * Philippines Campaign (1944–45)

Aircraft flown
- Bomber: SBD Dauntless
- Fighter: F4U Corsair; F9F Cougar; F2H Banshee

Marine Attack Squadron 236 (VMF-236) was an attack squadron in the Marine Corps Reserve. The squadron, also known as the "Black Panthers", was part of the Marine Forces Reserve for a short time following World War II and were based at Naval Air Station Anacostia, Washington, D.C. until their decommissioning. Originally established during World War II, the squadron fought in the Pacific War most notably during the Bougainville Campaign and the campaign to liberate the Philippines. The squadron conducted the first dive bombing attack against Bougainville and was credited with downing 4 Japanese aircraft during the course of the war. VMSB-236 was discommissioned on 1 August 1945 at Mindanao, Philippines two weeks before the surrender of Japan The unit was reactivated as part of the reserves but were again deactivated in the late 1960s. No other Marine Corps squadron has carried VMA-236's lineage and honors since that time.

== History ==
=== World War II ===
The squadron was formed on 1 January 1943 at Marine Corps Air Station Mojave, California as Marine Scout Bombing Squadron 236 (VMSB-236) flying the SBD Dauntless. In April 1943 they moved to Marine Corps Air Station Ewa, Hawaii for follow on training and eventually joined the war landing at Guadalcanal on 4 September 1943. From there the squadron took part in the first dive bombing strikes against Bougainville in preparation for the allied landing there on 1 November 1943. During the next year and a half the squadron would move frequently with its ground and air echelons being based in such places as Munda in the Solomon Islands, Torokina on Bougainville, Green Island in Papua New Guinea and Efate in what was then New Hebrides.

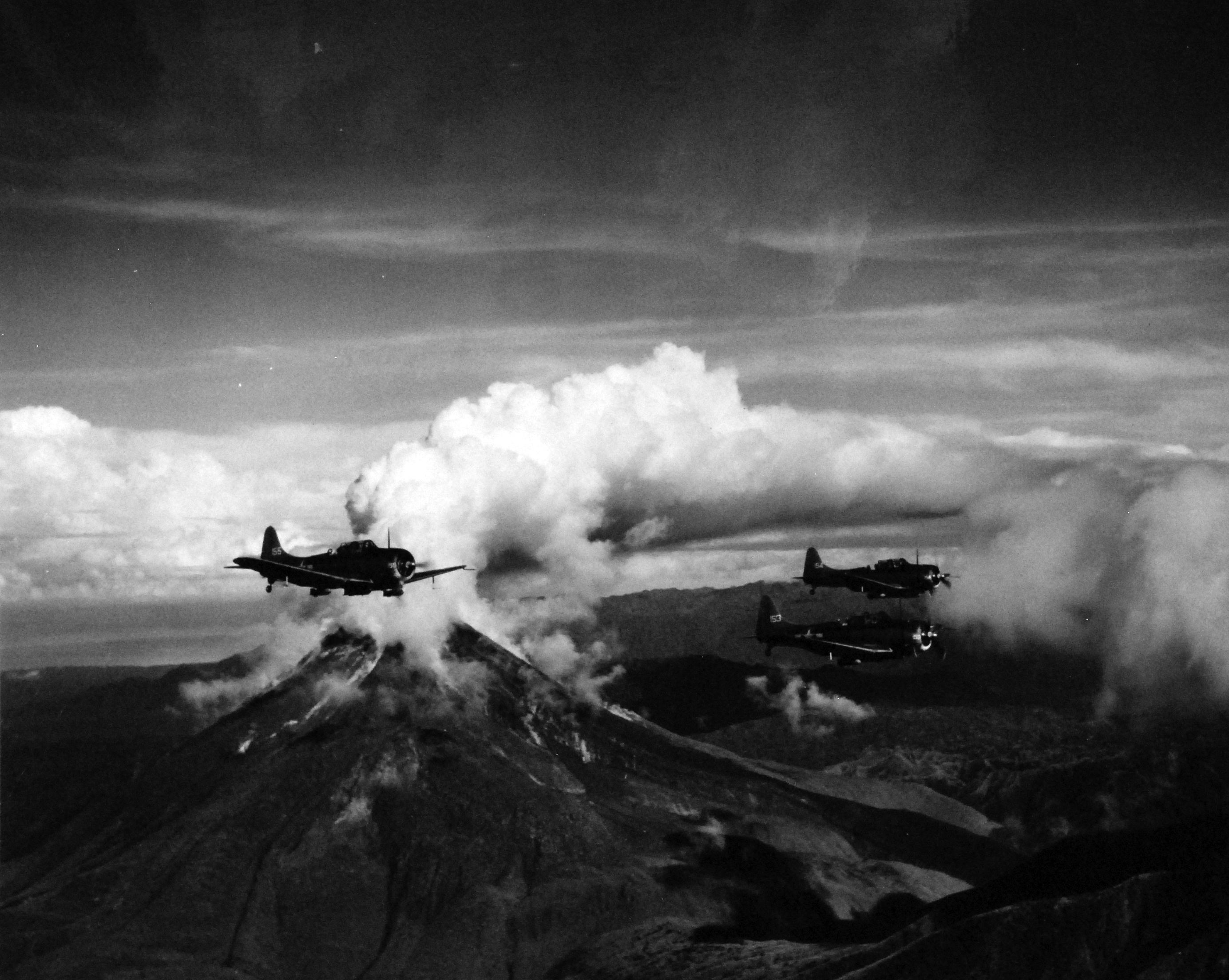
VMSB-236 SBDs over Bougainville, 1944.

In January 1945 the squadron moved to Luzon in the Philippines and became part of Marine Aircraft Group 24 (MAG-24) at an airfield in Mangaldan near Lingayen Gulf. Later on they moved to Moret Field on Mindanao. The squadron stayed in the Philippines for the remainder of the war flying close air support missions in support of the Sixth United States Army and Eighth United States Army. VMSB-236 was decommissioned on 1 August 1945 at Mindanao, Philippines two weeks before the surrender of Japan.

=== Reserve years ===
VMF-236 was reactivated on 28 February 1947 at Naval Air Station Denver as part of the Marine Air Reserve Training Command.

== See also ==
- United States Marine Corps Aviation
- List of active United States Marine Corps aircraft squadrons
- List of decommissioned United States Marine Corps aircraft squadrons
