= VMA-123 =

Marine Attack Squadron 123
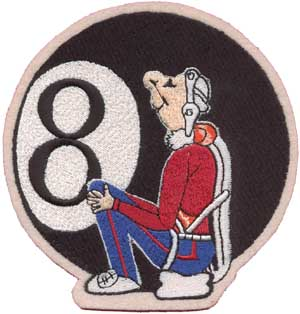
- VMF-123 Insignia
- Active: 7 Sep 1942 – 10 Sep 1945; 2 May 1946 – 31 Oct 1965
- Country: United States
- Allegiance: United States of America
- Branch: United States Marine Corps
- Type: Fighter squadron
- Role: Air interdiction
- Part of: Inactive
- Nickname(s): Eight Balls; Flying Eight Balls
- Engagements: World War II * Battle of Guadalcanal * Battle of Iwo Jima * Battle of Okinawa

Marine Attack Squadron 123 (VMA-123) was a fighter squadron of the United States Marine Corps during World War II and later transitioned to an attack squadron in the Marine Forces Reserve. Known as the "Flying Eight Balls," the squadron fought at Guadalcanal, Iwo Jima, and Okinawa and served as a training squadron for replacement pilots during the Korean War. The squadron was decommissioned on 31 October 1965 at Naval Air Station Los Alamitos.

== History ==
=== World War II ===
VMF-123 was commissioned on 7 September 1942 at Camp Kearney. The squadron took delivery of 18 Grumman F4F Wildcats in December of that year. A large percentage of the squadron’s initial pilots came from the experienced VMF-121 hoping it would require them less time to become combat ready. The squadron embarked upon the SS Lurline and departed the United States on 8 January 1943. They arrived at Noumea on 22 January, where they transferred to the USS Hunter Liggett. Arriving at Efate on 26 January, they eventually boarded DC-3s flying for Espiritu Santo on 2 February. The squadron arrived at Henderson Field on Guadalcanal on 3 February 1943 and flew their first combat mission the following day. Because they were the last of the Marine fighter squadrons to arrive in the Solomon Islands, VMF-123 was the last of these eight squadrons to transition from the Grumman F4F Wildcat to the Vought F4U Corsair.

In August 1943, the squadron moved to the new field at Munda in the Central Solomon Islands and flew their first mission from there on 14 August 1943. Their arrival on Munda coincided with the landings on Vella Lavella which were constantly under attack from Japanese aircraft based on Bougainville. VMF-123 was one of many squadrons that fought Japanese aircraft for control of the skies over Vella Lavella. The squadron was split up in September 1943 with half remaining on Munda and the other half moving to a field in the Russell Islands. Their last mission in the South Pacific was flown in November 1943 and the squadron returned to the United States on 14 December 1943.

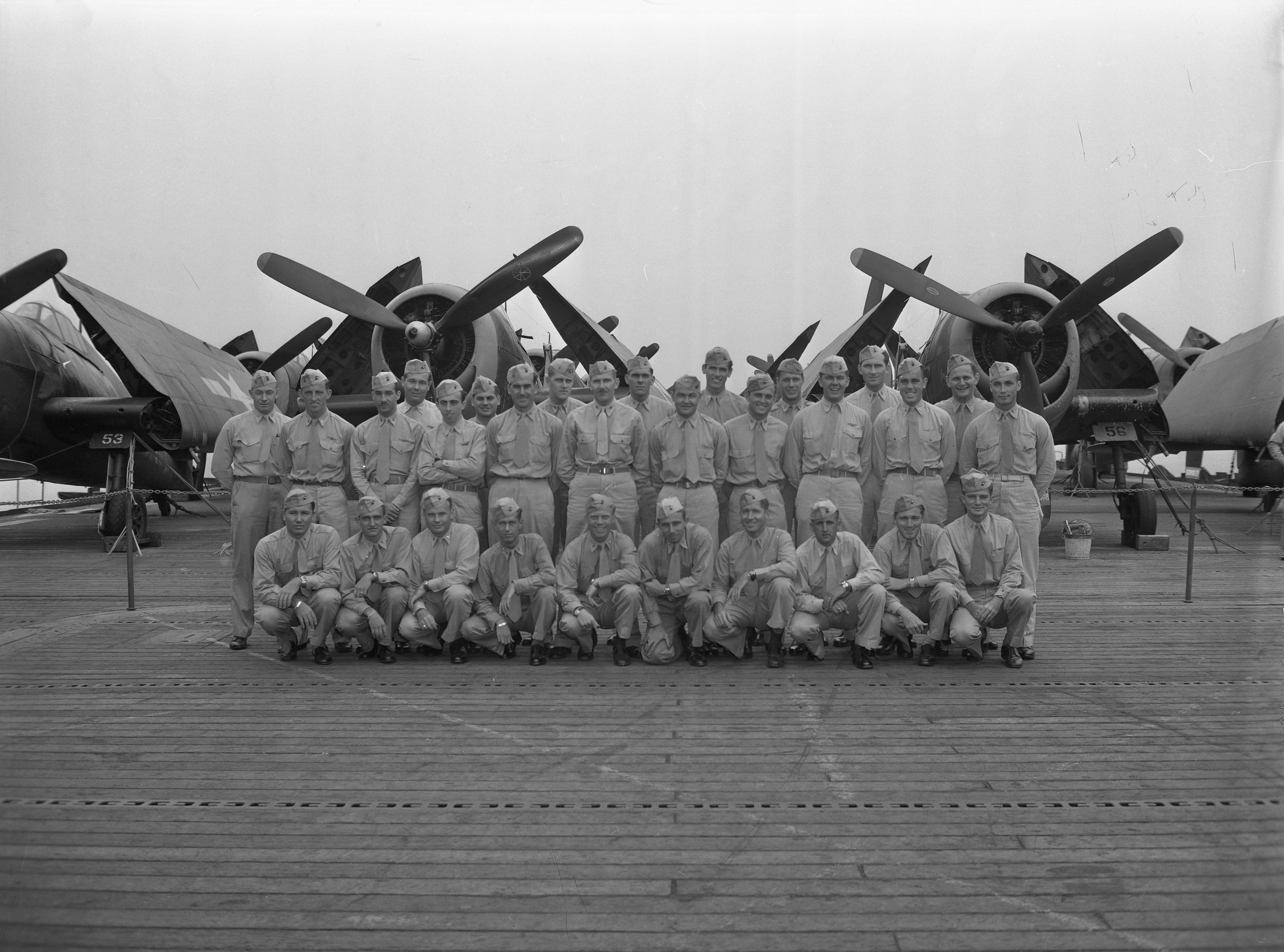
VMF-123 pilots on an aircraft carrier flight deck and they return to the United States on 9 July 1945.

VMF-123 spent the majority of 1944 resting and refitting. On 31 December 1944, the squadron, along with VMF-112 boarded the USS Bennington for their third combat tour. During this cruise, which last until 16 June 1945, they participated in the Battle of Iwo Jima, took part in the first carrier strikes against Tokyo since the Doolittle Raid in 1942, and participated in the entire Okinawa Campaign. During their cruise on the USS Bennington, the squadron had seven pilots killed in action and five permanently listed as missing in action.

Upon their return to the U.S., the squadron was based out of Marine Corps Air Station El Centro where they were teamed with VMTB-623 as they trained for the upcoming invasion of Japan. They were scheduled to deploy on board the USS Saidor when the war ended. The squadron was deactivated shortly thereafter on 10 September 1945.

=== Reserve years ===
In the late 1940s, the squadron was again reactivated as part of the Marine Forces Reserve and were based out of Naval Air Station Los Alamitos. Shortly after the outbreak of the Korean War, the squadron was called to active duty on 23 July 1950, however they did not deploy to combat. Instead, they served as a training squadron for replacement Corsair pilots on their way to the war. Following the war, they transitioned to jet aircraft and were later decommissioned on 31 October 1965.

== See also ==
- United States Marine Corps Aviation
- List of active United States Marine Corps aircraft squadrons
- List of decommissioned United States Marine Corps aircraft squadrons
- Flyboys: A True Story of Courage
