= VMF-472 =

Marine Fighting Squadron 472
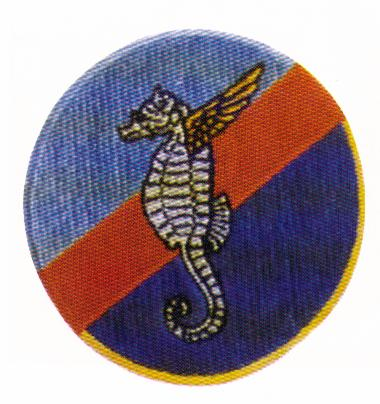
- VMF-472 Insignia
- Active: 1 Jun 1944 - 10 Oct 1944; 1 Mar 1945 – 24 Dec 1945
- Country: United States
- Allegiance: United States of America
- Branch: United States Marine Corps
- Type: Fighter squadron
- Role: Air interdiction Close air support
- Part of: Inactive
- Nickname: "The Flying Seahorses"

Aircraft flown
- Fighter: F6F Hellcat

Marine Fighting Squadron 472 (VMF-472) was a fighter squadron of the United States Marine Corps during World War II. Known as "The Flying Seahorses", the squadron flew the Grumman F6F Hellcat during its short time in existence. The squadron was slated to support the invasion of Japan in late 1945 however the Japanese surrender meant it did not get further than Hawaii and did not participate in combat action during the war. VMF-472 was decommissioned on 24 December 1945 and no other Marine Corps squadron has carried its lineage and honors since.

== History ==
Marine Fighting Squadron 472 was commissioned on 1 June 1944 at Marine Corps Air Station El Centro, California. The squadron trained in the California desert for four months before being decommissioned on 1 October 1944 at Marine Corps Air Station El Toro. After decommissioning the squadron's assets were redistributed to VMF-461. VMF-472 was reactivated on 1 March 1945 at Marine Corps Air Station Mojave, CA, under the command of Marine Air Support Group 51 (MASG-51), this time tasked with training for operations on Navy escort carriers. This was part of a larger program to have eight Marine air groups trained and ready to operate from escort carriers in support of the invasion of Japan in late 1945. In May 1945 the squadron was briefly re-designated at VMF(CVS)-472 however by 1 June it had reverted to its original moniker.

VMF-472 departed the West Coast of the United States in July 1945 reaching Marine Corps Air Station Ewa, Hawaii that same month. The squadron remained in Hawaii after the end of the war and was eventually decommissioned on 24 December 1945 at MCAS Ewa.

== Commanding Officers ==
The following naval aviators served as commanding officers of VMF-472 during its existence:

- Lt Charles M. Jackson - 1 June 1944
- Capt George C. Hays - 2 June 1944 – 12 June 1944
- Maj John A. Reeder - 13 June 1944 – 25 June 1944
- Maj Richard F. Harrison - 26 June 1944 – 6 July 1944
- Maj Hamilton Lawrence - 7 July 1944 – 1 October 1944
- Maj Robert L. Bryson - 1 March 1945 - Unknown

== Unit awards ==
A unit citation or commendation is an award bestowed upon an organization for the action cited. Members of the unit who participated in said actions are allowed to wear on their uniforms the awarded unit citation. VMF-472 was presented with the following awards:

| Ribbon | Unit Award |
|---|---|
| | World War II Victory Medal |

== See also ==
- United States Marine Corps Aviation
- List of active United States Marine Corps aircraft squadrons
- List of decommissioned United States Marine Corps aircraft squadrons
