= List of decommissioned United States Marine Corps aircraft squadrons =

While other nations have Marines who are aviators, only the United States Marine Corps has its own dedicated aviation arm. Most squadrons have changed names and designations many times over the years so they are listed by their final designation.

== Squadron designations ==
The basic tactical and administrative unit of United States Marine Corps Aviation is the squadron. Fixed-wing aircraft squadrons (heavier than air) are denoted by the letter "V," which comes from the French verb "Voler" (to fly). Rotary wing (helicopter) squadrons use "H." Marine squadrons are always noted by the second letter "M." Squadron numbering is not linear as some were numbered in ascending order and others took numbers from the wing or the ship to which they were assigned. From 1920 to 1941, Marine flying squadrons were identified by one digit numbers. This changed on 1 July 1941 when all existing squadrons were redesignated to a three-digit system. The first two numbers were supposed to identify the squadrons parent group but with the rapid expansion during the war and frequent transfer of squadrons this system fell apart.

== Decommissioned squadrons ==
Squadrons are listed by their designation at the time they were decommissioned.

=== Pre–World War II squadrons ===
Following World War I, Marine aviation was significantly reduced from 8 to 3 squadrons. Many of the squadrons were renamed and re-designated numerous times and many still exist today with other designations. The squadrons listed below reflect those squadrons that were decommissioned prior to World War II and were never reconstituted in any form.

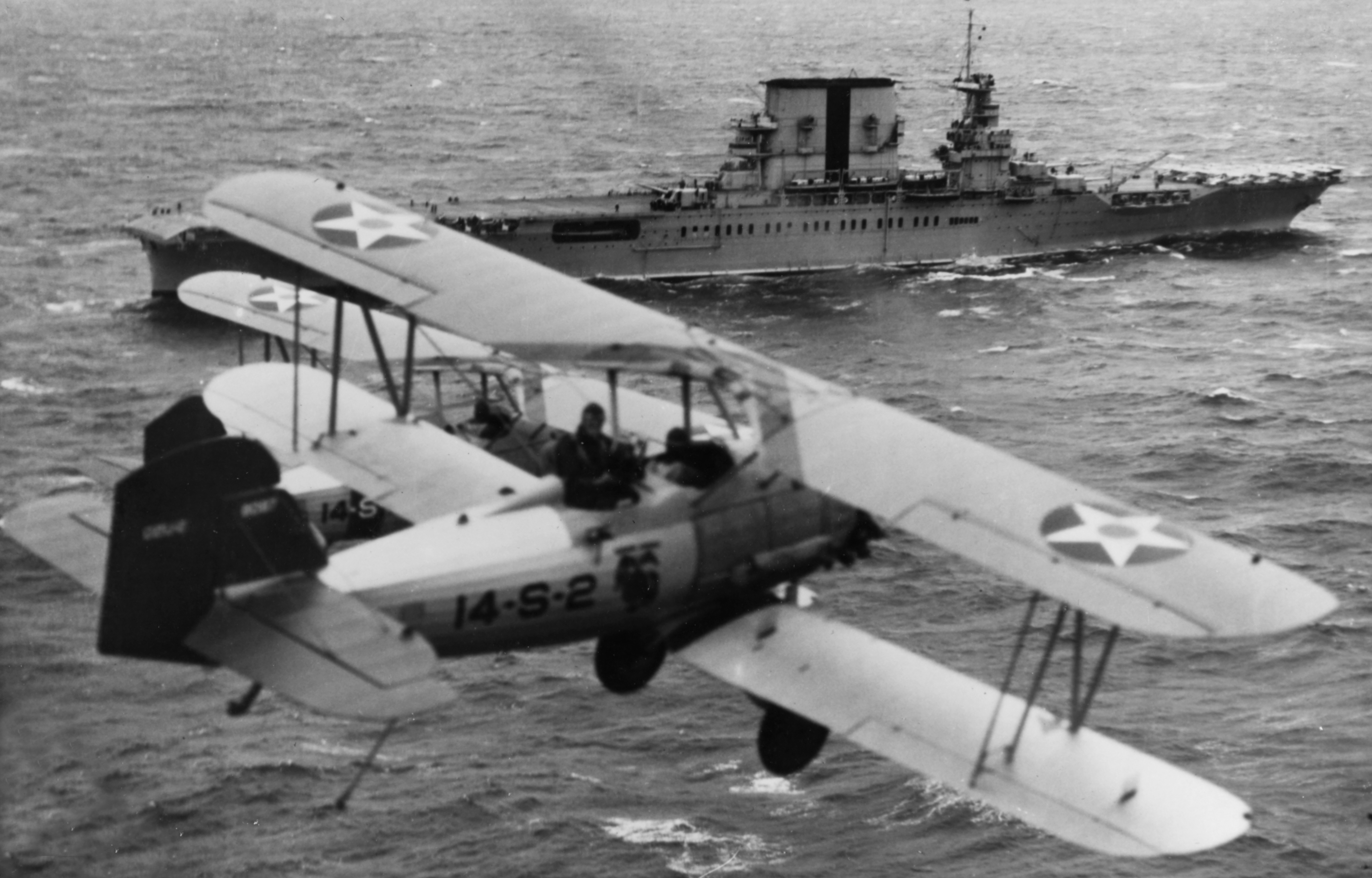
USMC Vought O2U-2 Corsairs flying past the USS Saratoga (CV-3), c. 1930.

Squadron Name	Insignia	Nickname	Date Decommissioned	Sources
VP-3M; Marine Patrol Squadron 3			1931	
VO-6M; Marine Observation Squadron 6		Hell Divers	1932	
VO-10M; Marine Observation Squadron 10			1 April 1931	
VS-14M; Marine Scouting Squadron 14			1 July 1933	
VS-15M; Marine Scouting Squadron 15			1 July 1933	
ZK-1M; 1st Marine Barrage Balloon Squadron			31 December 1929	

=== Marine Reserve Scouting Squadrons ===
The Marine Aviation Reserve was inactive from 1918 through 1928. When it was reconstituted, the names and aircraft used by these squadrons changed frequently but their home duty stations remained constant. The aircraft for these squadrons were assigned to the reserve bases themselves and were shared with co-located Navy Reserve squadrons. The squadrons were absorbed into the 1st and 2nd Marine Aircraft Wings and their identities lost when they were mobilized in December 1940.

Squadron Name	Insignia	Nickname	Location	Date Decommissioned	Source
VMS-1R			Boston, Massachusetts	December 1940	
VMS-2R			Brooklyn, New York	December 1940	
VMS-3R			Anacostia, D.C.	December 1940	
VMS-4R			Miami, Florida	December 1940	
VMS-5R		Black Knights	Grosse Ile, Michigan	December 1940	
VMS-6R			Minneapolis, Minnesota	December 1940	
VMS-7R			Long Beach, California	December 1940	
VMS-8R			Oakland, California	December 1940	
VMS-9R			Seattle, Washington	December 1940	
VMS-10R			Kansas City, Kansas	December 1940	
VMS-11R			Brooklyn, New York	December 1940	

=== Marine Barrage Balloon Squadrons ===
Squadrons flying lighter than air vehicles (balloons), were indicated by the letter Z in naval squadron designation. The first use of balloons by the Marine Corps was during World War I when they were used for artillery spotting. After the outbreak of World War II, the Navy authorized the Marine Corps to create barrage balloon squadrons for the air defense of advanced naval bases. Balloon training was cancelled in the summer of 1943 and the remaining units were decommissioned by the end of the year.

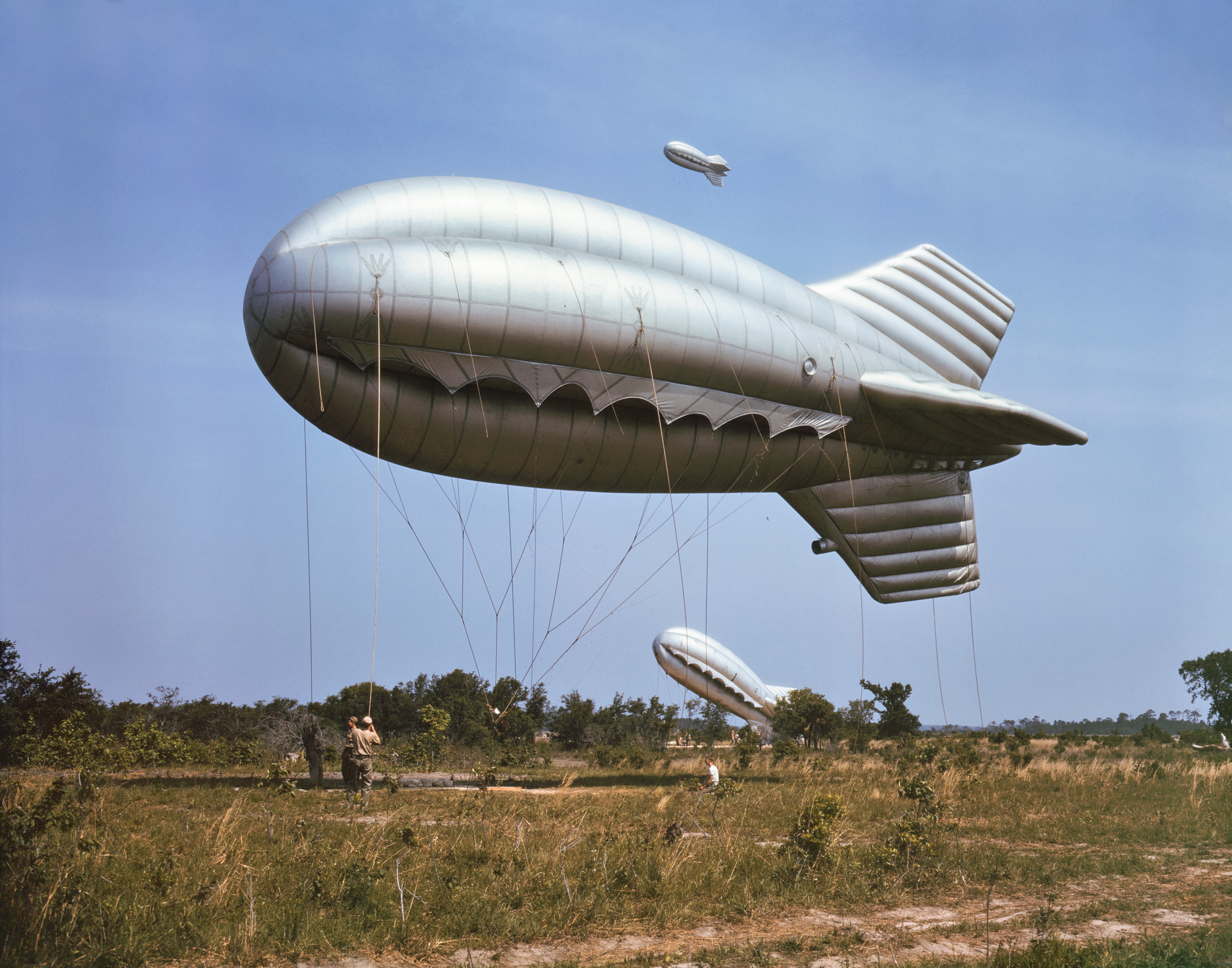
Barrage balloon at Parris Island in May 1942

Squadron Name	Insignia	Nickname	Date Decommissioned	Source
ZMQ-1			15 December 1943	
ZMQ-2			21 August 1943	
ZMQ-3			9 December 1943	
ZMQ-4			20 February 1943	
ZMQ-5			5 December 1943	
ZMQ-6			8 December 1943	

=== Marine Balloon Observation Squadron ===
ZK-1M was formed in 1924 and disbanded in 1929.

=== Marine Scout Bombing Squadrons ===
Scout bombing squadrons each had eighteen to twenty-four Douglas SBD Dauntless dive bombers and were tasked with conducting dive-bombing attacks and long range scouting and patrol missions. They also provided close air support, laid smoke screens and sprayed DDT around bases. The majority of these squadrons were quickly decommissioned following the end of World War II although three entered the Marine Air Reserve for a short period.

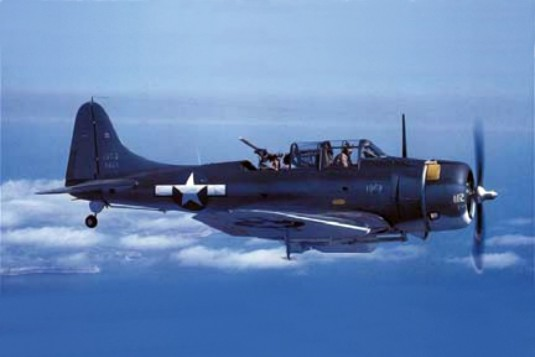
SBD Dauntless

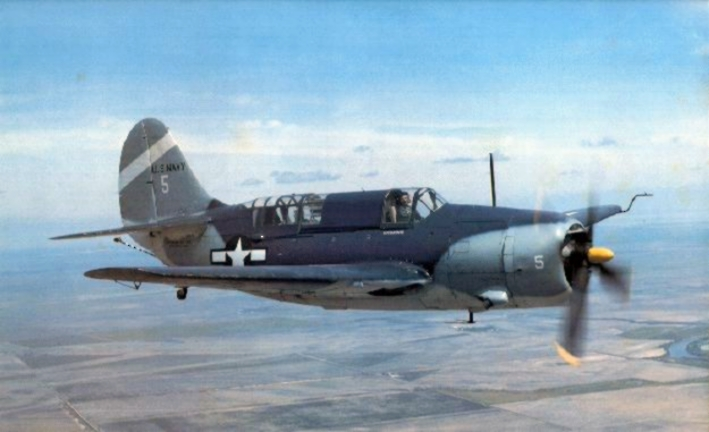
SB2C Helldiver

Squadron Name	Insignia	Nickname	Date Decommissioned	Source
VMSB-243		Flying Goldbricks	25 September 1945	
VMSB-244		Bombing Banshees	10 June 1946	
VMSB-245		Red Mousie	17 November 1945	
VMSB-342		Bats from Hell	10 October 1944	
VMSB-343		Gregory's Gorillas	10 June 1946	
VMSB-344			10 October 1944	
VMSB-474			10 September 1945	
VMSB-484			10 September 1945	

Squadron Name	Insignia	Nickname	Date Decommissioned
VMSB-931			31 January 1946
VMSB-932		Teufelhund	31 January 1946
VMSB-933			10 September 1945
VMSB-934			15 October 1945
VMSB-941			10 October 1944
VMSB-942			10 October 1944
VMSB-943			31 January 1946
VMSB-944			10 October 1944

=== Marine Torpedo Bombing Squadrons ===
VMTBs were torpedo bomber squadrons that operated the Grumman TBF Avenger. They were in service with the Marine Corps during World War II and were decommissioned shortly after the war. They were part of the Cactus Air Force on Guadalcanal, served on escort carriers during the campaign to retake the Philippines and provided close air support for Australian forces on Borneo and Marines during the Battle of Okinawa.

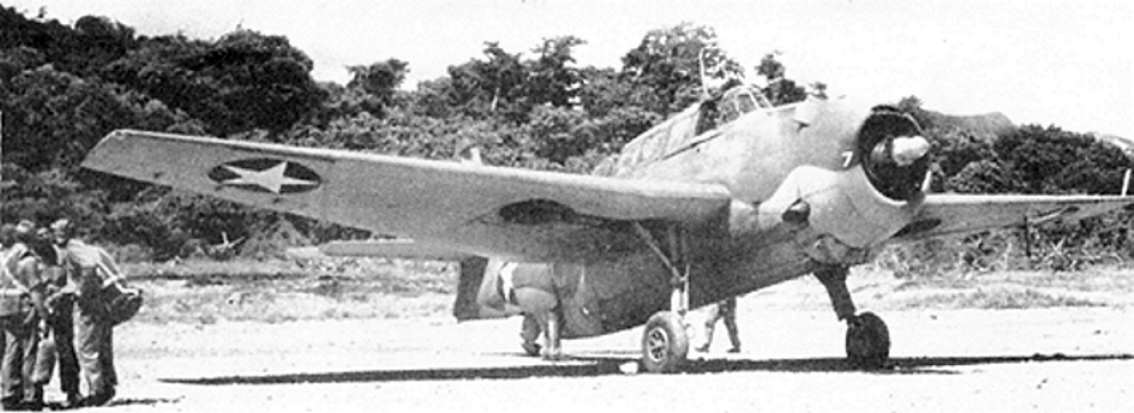
Marine TBF on Guadalcanal, 1942

Squadron Name	Insignia	Nickname	Date Decommissioned	Source
VMTB-151		Ali Baba	20 March 1946	
VMTB-341		Torrid Turtles	13 September 1945	
VMTB-453			20 March 1946	
VMTB-454		Helldivers	28 January 1946	
VMB-473			20 March 1946	
VMTB-621			10 March 1946	
VMTB-622			31 January 1946	
VMTB-623			20 March 1946	
VMTB-624			10 March 1946	

=== Marine Fighting Squadrons ===
Marine Fighting Squadrons were multirole squadrons responsible for air-to-air combat, combat air patrols, attacking enemy shipping, escorting bombers and close air support. By far the most numerous of any type of Marine Corps squadron, they first made their mark flying the Grumman F4F Wildcat as part of the Cactus Air Force on Guadalcanal and finished World War II flying the venerable Vought F4U Corsair. Many VMF squadrons continued to operate after the war with most in the Marine Air Reserve; however, with the retirement of the Vought F-8 Crusader the VMF squadrons either became VMFAs or were decommissioned.

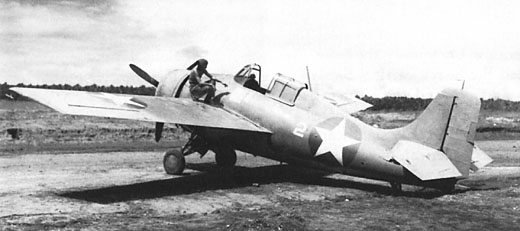
Grumman F4F Wildcat

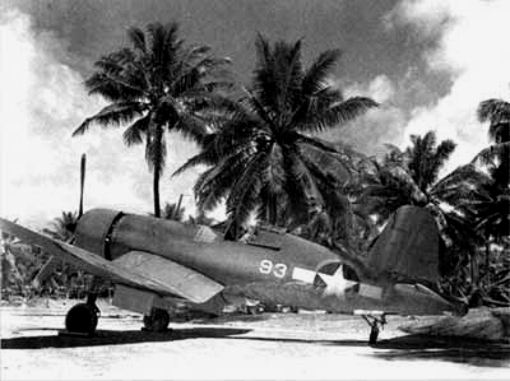
Vought F4U Corsair

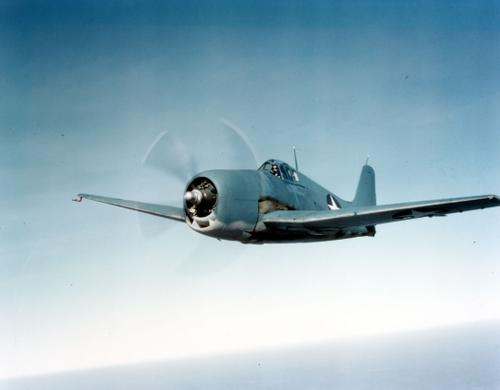
Grumman F6F Hellcat

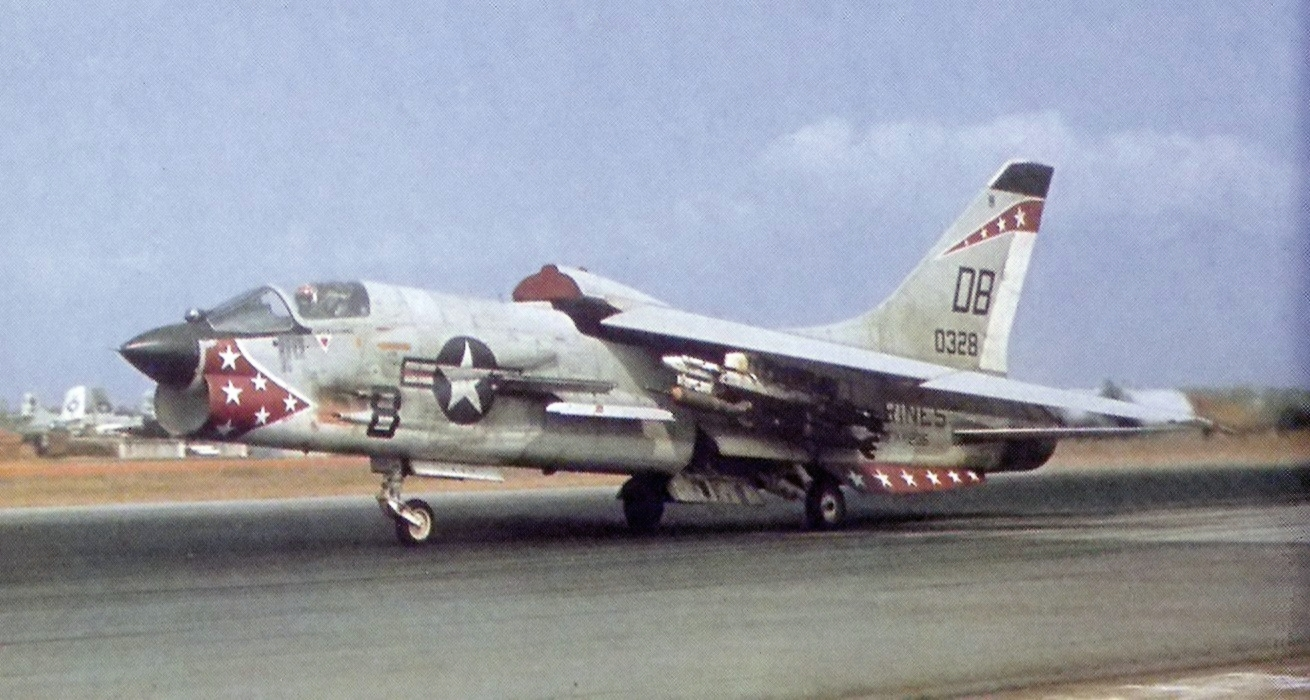
Vought F-8 Crusader

Squadron Name	Insignia	Nickname	Date Decommissioned	Sources
VMF-111		Devil Dogs	31 October 1965	
VMF-113		Whistling Devils	31 October 1965	
VMF(AW)-114		Death Dealers	1 July 1963	
VMF-132		Crying Red Asses	9 November 1945	
VMF-155		Ready Teddys	15 October 1945	
VMF-213		Hell Hawks	mid-1970	
VMF-215		Fighting Corsairs	30 January 1970	
VMF-218		Hellions	30 September 1962	
VMF-221		Fighting Falcons	31 October 1965	
VMF-313		Lily Packin’ Hellbirds	31 December 1962	
VMF-413		Shamrocks	January 1963	
VMF-422		Flying Buccaneers	30 June 1947	
VMF-441		Blackjacks	31 October 1965	
VMF-452		Sky Raiders	31 December 1949	
VMF-471			10 September 1945	

Squadron Name	Insignia	Nickname	Date Decommissioned
VMF-472		Flying Seahorses	24 December 1945
VMF-481			10 September 1945
VMF-482			10 October 1944
VMF-511			31 August 1972
VMF-512			10 March 1946
VMF-514		The Whistling Death	9 December 1945
VMF-521			10 September 1945
VMF-522			10 September 1945
VMF-523			15 October 1945
VMF-524			15 October 1945
VMF-541		The Bat Eyes	early 1960s
VMF-911		Devilcats	15 March 1946
VMF-912			15 March 1946
VMF-913			31 January 1946
VMF-914			31 January 1946
VMF-921			10 October 1944
VMF-922			10 October 1944
VMF-923			10 October 1944
VMF-924			10 October 1944

=== Marine Night Fighter Squadrons ===
After witnessing the Royal Air Force's success using radar directed fighters at night in 1941, the Navy's Bureau of Aeronautics authorized eight Marine night fighter squadrons to be formed by 1945. This timeline was brought forward considerably after the attack on Pearl Harbor and their need proven by the frustration of the Cactus Air Force's pilots not being able to engage Japanese bombers at night during the Battle of Guadalcanal. This led to the formation of VMF(N)-531 in November 1942. After much deliberation the Lockheed PV-1 Ventura was picked as the first choice of aircraft for these squadrons. The night fighting squadrons featured radar equipped aircraft, ground-based radar and personnel that provided Ground-controlled interception (GCI). The VMF(N) designated squadrons were decommissioned after the war, those that weren't were re-designated VMF(AW).

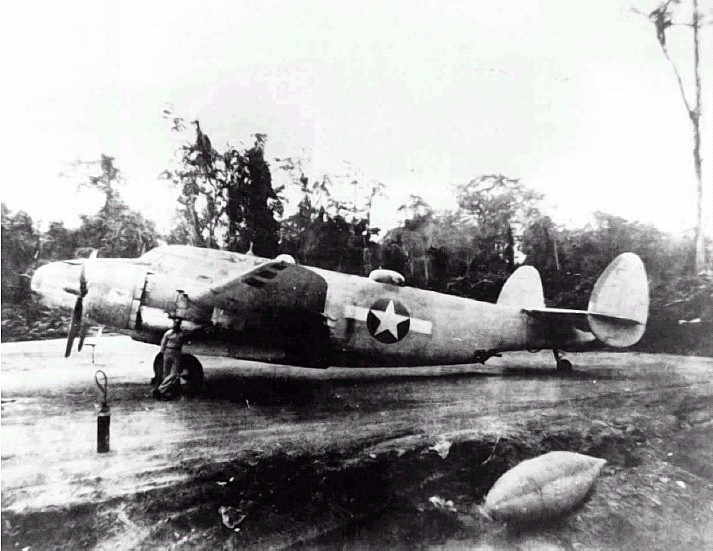
Lockheed PV-1 Ventura night fighter from VMF(N)-531, 1943.

Squadron Name	Insignia	Nickname	Date Decommissioned	Source
VMF(N)-532		Night Fighters	31 May 1947	
VMF(N)-534			31 May 1947	
VMF(N)-544			20 April 1946	

=== Marine Bombing Squadrons ===
The Marine Bombing Squadrons were formed during World War II to fill the need for a long range, land based bomber that could be used against enemy shipping and submarines. In the Pacific Theater, the squadrons served ashore as a garrison air force to attack bypassed Japanese bases and other installations. The VMBs flew the North American PBJ-1 Mitchell, which was the naval version of the U.S. Army Air Forces' B-25 Mitchell. Sixteen of these squadrons were commissioned with seven serving in combat, four never able to leave the U.S. due to the war ending and four others converted to VMTB squadrons. The seven PBJ squadrons that saw combat in the Pacific suffered the loss of 45 aircraft, 26 in combat and 19 in non-combat operations, and 173 crew: 62 officers and 111 enlisted men.

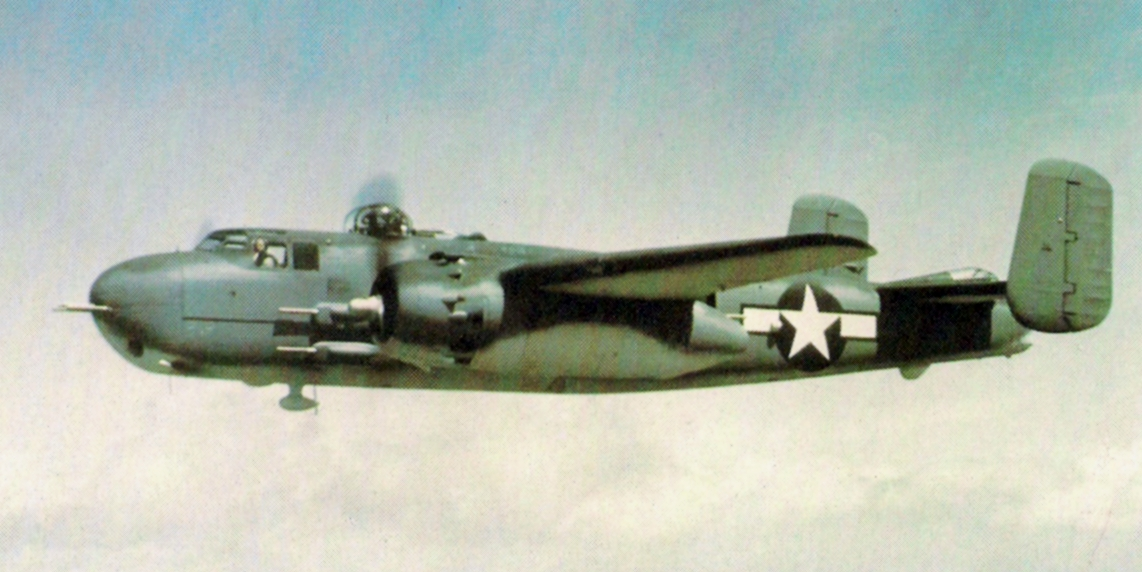
North American PBJ-1 Mitchell

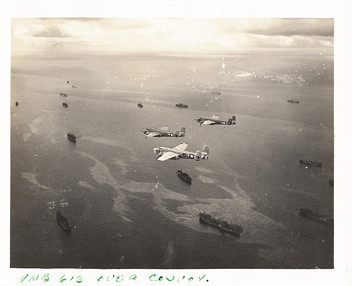
A convoy sails under the watchful eyes of three of VMB-613's crews

Squadron Name	Insignia	Nickname	Date Decommissioned	Source
VMB-423		Seahorses	30 November 1945	
VMB-433		Fork-Tailed Devils	30 November 1945	
VMB-443		Wildcats	30 November 1945	
VMB-483			15 March 1945	
VMB-612		Cram's Rams	14 March 1946	
VMB-613			21 November 1945	
VMB-614		Ruptured Ducks	28 December 1945	

=== Marine Operational Training Squadrons ===
All of these squadrons were activated as Marine Training Squadrons (MTS) at Marine Corps Air Station Edenton, North Carolina in January 1944 and were redesignated as Marine Operational Training Squadrons (MOTS) and transferred to Marine Corps Air Station Cherry Point, North Carolina in February 1945 as medium bomber pilot training units. They instructed Marines learning to fly the North American PBJ-1 Mitchell. Following the end of the war they were quickly decommissioned.

Squadron Name	Insignia	Nickname	Date Decommissioned	Source
MOTS-811			10 September 1945	
MOTS-812			10 September 1945	
MOTS-813			23 November 1945	
MOTS-814			30 November 1945	

=== Marine Photographic Squadrons ===
Marine photographic squadrons were first formed in 1942 and went through numerous name changes while they were active. VMDs/VMPs flew photographic modified versions of the Douglas SBD Dauntless, Consolidated PB4Y-1 Liberator, Consolidated PB4Y-2 Privateer and Grumman F7F Tigercat. The main mission of these squadrons was to conduct long range, very high-altitude photographic reconnaissance.

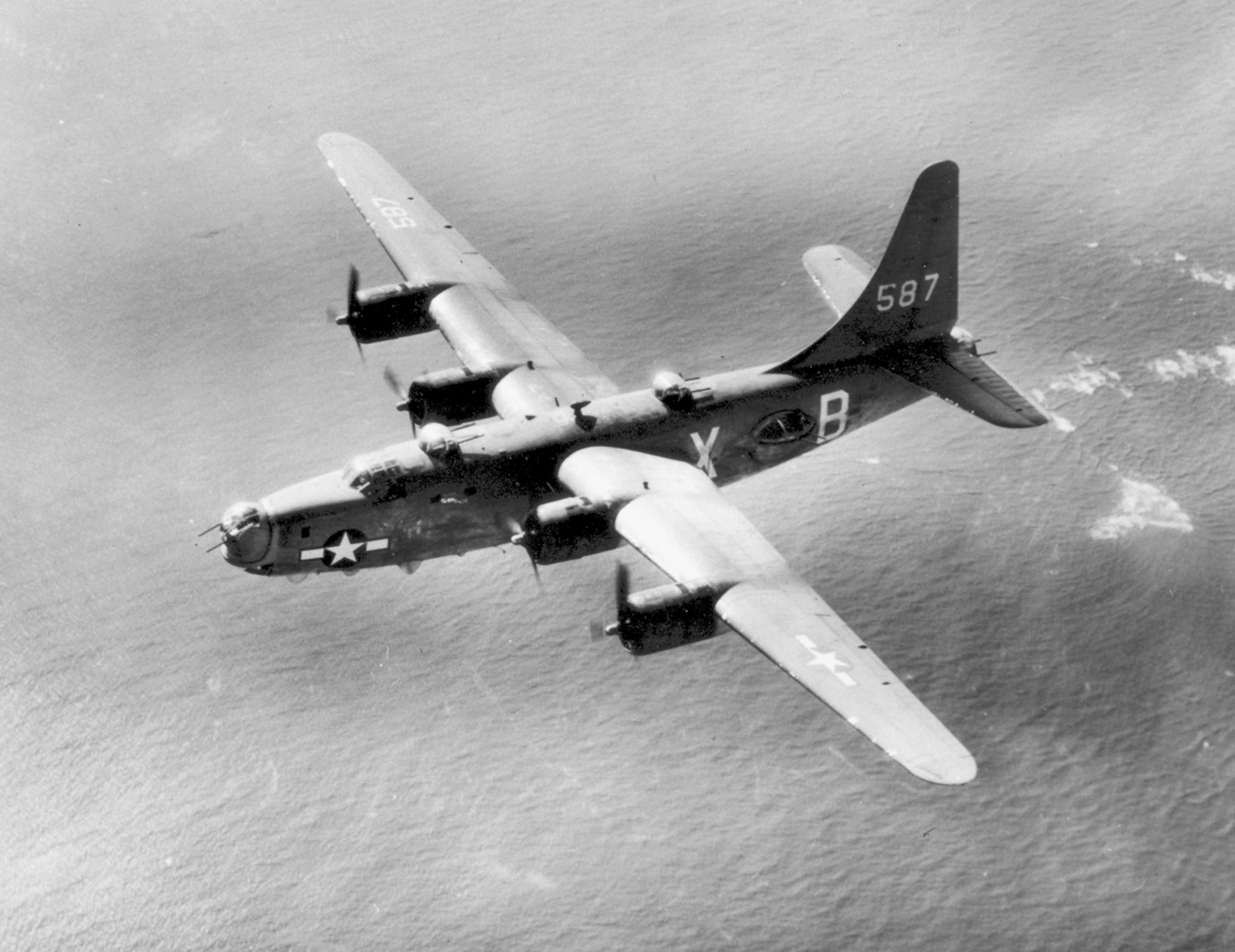
Consolidated PB4Y-2 Privateer

Squadron Name	Insignia	Nickname	Date Decommissioned	Source
VMD-154		Pathfinders	10 September 1945	
VMP-254			30 November 1949	
VMP-354			8 December 1949	
VMD-954			31 January 1946	

=== Marine Glider Squadron ===
The Marine Corps established a glider program in April 1942. Eventually they set goals of having 10,800 Marines qualified as glider infantry, with 1,371 gliders and 3,436 pilots. They originally operated from Page Field on MCRD Parris Island but later moved to Marine Corps Air Station Eagle Mountain Lake outside Dallas, Texas. The program was disbanded in 1943 when it was determined that glider assaults into small, heavily fortified, jungle islands would be tactically unfeasible.

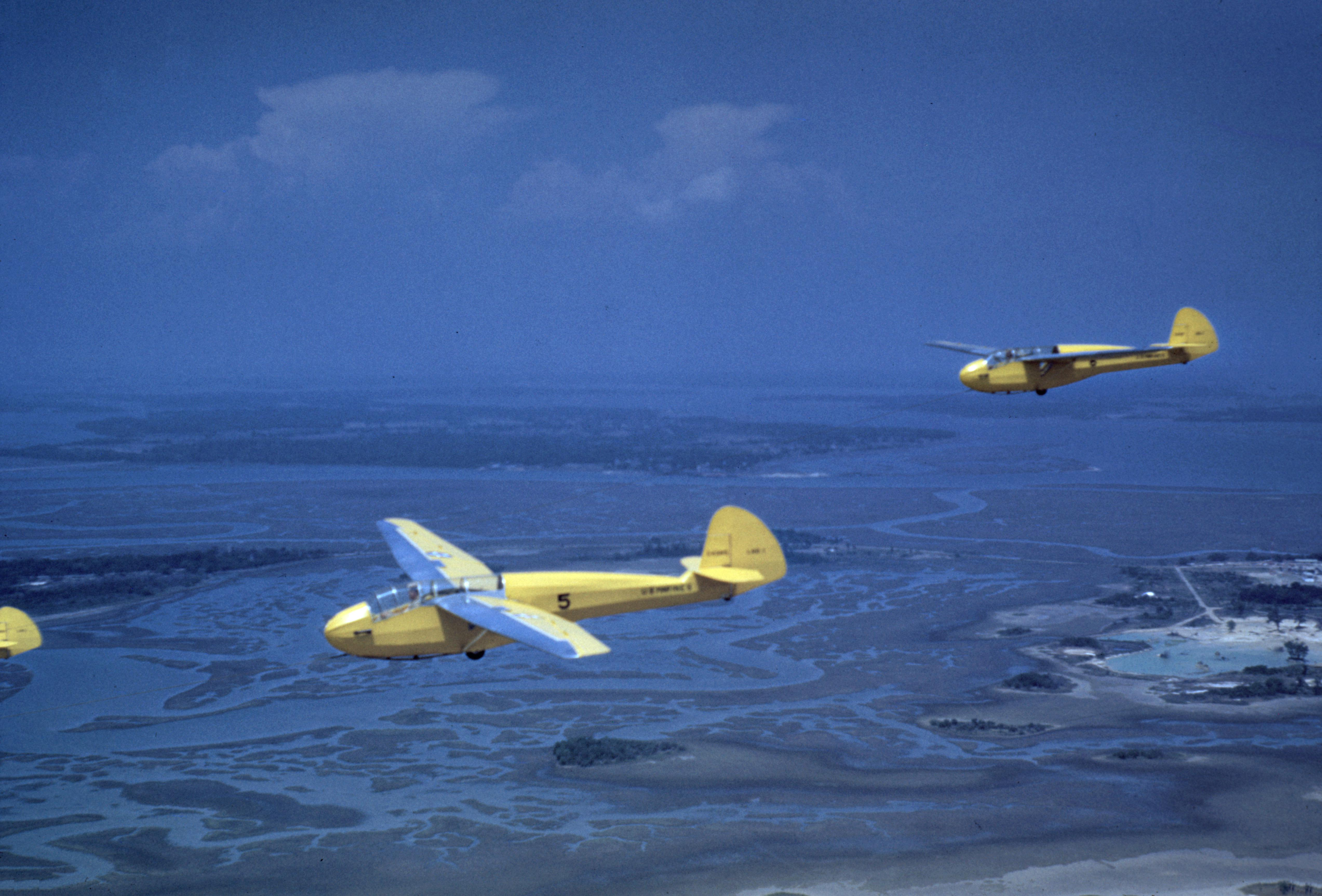
Marine Gliders

Squadron Name	Insignia	Nickname	Date Decommissioned	Source
VML-711			24 May 1943	

=== Marine Transport Squadrons ===
Flying the Douglas R4D Skytrain and the Curtiss R5C-1 Commando, these squadrons were responsible for moving troops and cargo, aerial resupply, delivery of Paramarines, and medical evacuation.

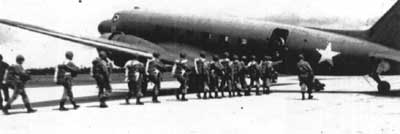
A stick of Marines boards a Douglas R4D Skytrain

Squadron Name	Insignia	Nickname	Date Decommissioned	Source
VMR-152			January 31, 1959	
VMR-216		Bull Dogs	December 21,1972	
VMR-222			August 1, 1969	
VMR-353			15 February 1946	
VMR-952			May 31, 1947	
VMR-953		Puss in Boots	May 31,1947	

=== Marine Scouting Squadrons ===
There were three Marine Scouting Squadrons prior to World War II; however, VMS-3 was the only squadron to retain the designation. The squadron served in Haiti from 1919 through 1934 and then spent its last ten years at St. Thomas, Virgin Islands. During World War II they were the only Marine Corps squadron to operate east of the United States. They began the war flying the Grumman J2F Duck, transitioned to the Naval Aircraft Factory/Vought OS2N Kingfisher and at the time of deactivation were flying SBD Dauntless dive bombers.

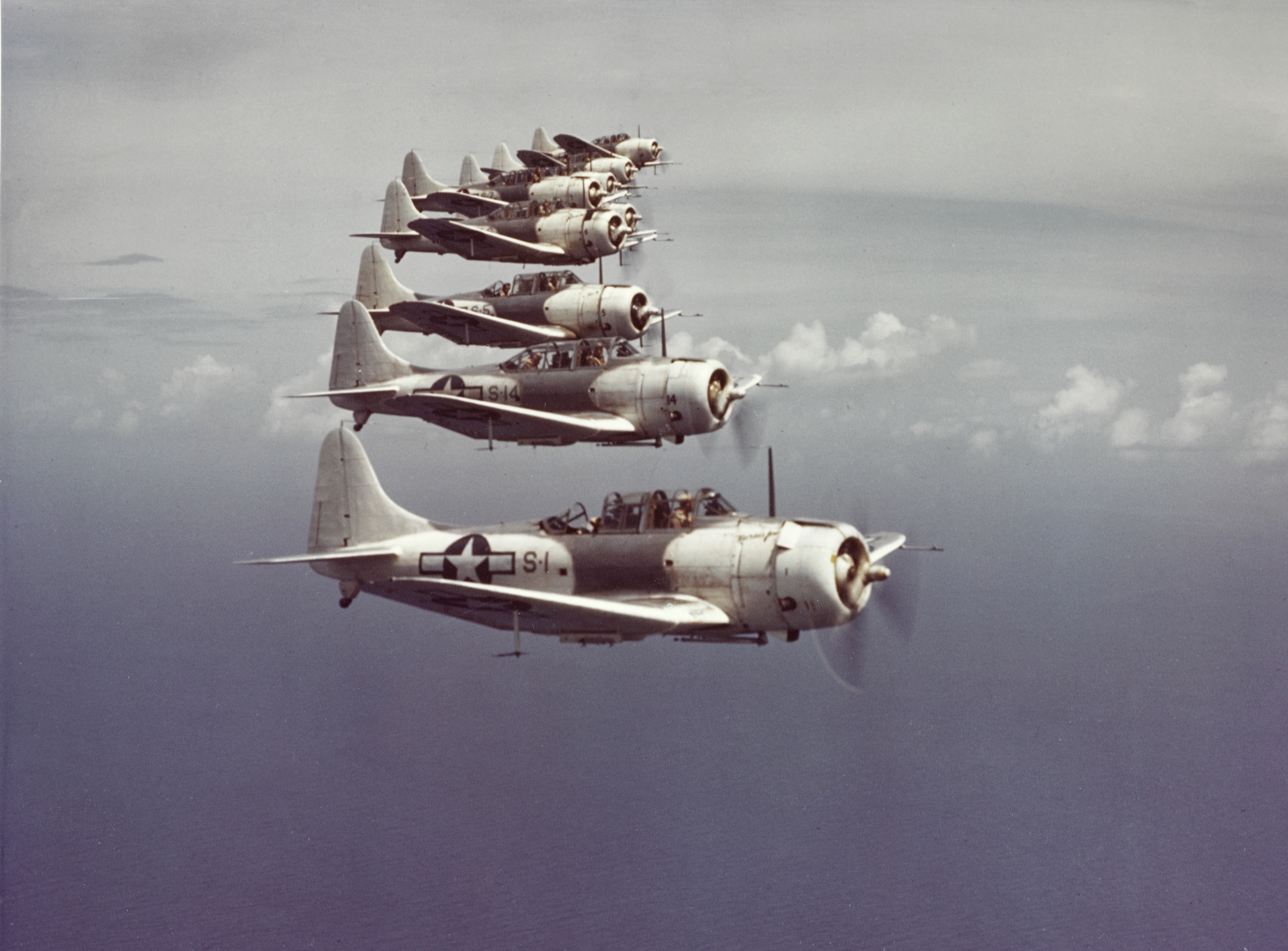
VMS-3 Douglas SBD Dauntless

Squadron Name	Insignia	Nickname	Date Decommissioned	Source
VMS-3		Devilbirds	20 May 1944	

=== Marine Target Towing Detachments ===
Marine Target Towing detachments were first formed at Marine Corps Air Station Ewa in October 1944. They were responsible for towing targets for antiaircraft gunnery and radar tracking practice. They flew Martin JM-1 Marauders and the Curtiss R5C-1 Commandos. The last of these detachments was decommissioned in March 1946.

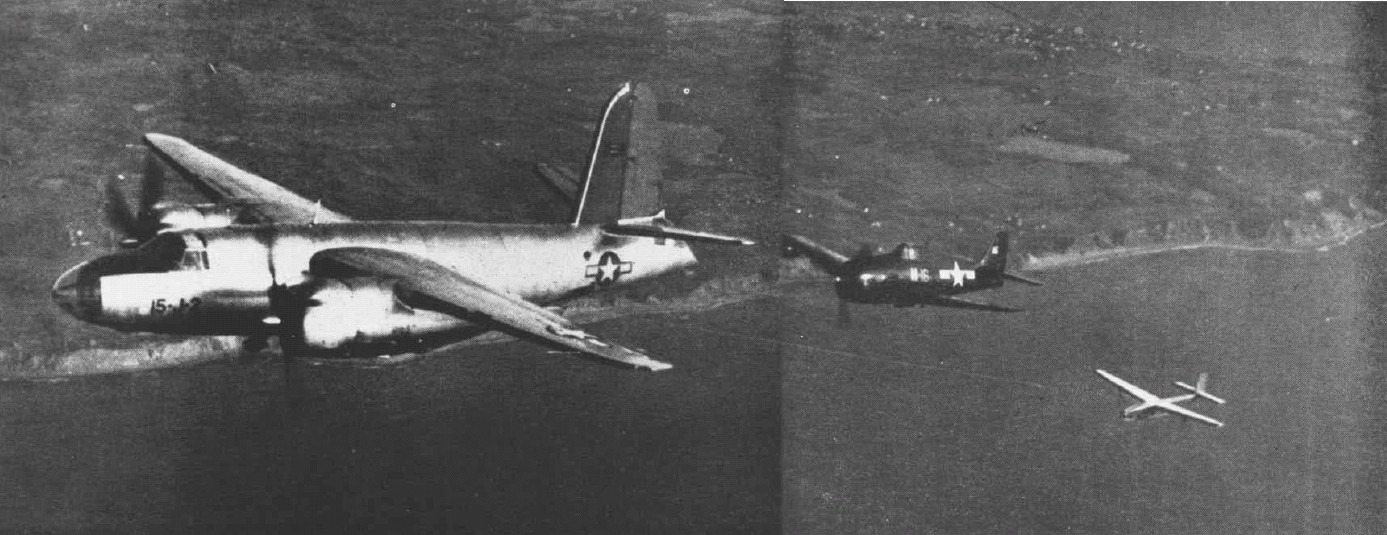
Martin JM-1 Marauder

Squadron Name	Insignia	Nickname	Date Decommissioned	Source
VMJ-1			October 1945	
VMJ-2			6 March 1946	
VMJ-3		Red Asses	21 October 1945	

=== Marine Observation Squadrons ===
The Marine observation squadrons were formed during the latter stages of World War II with the primary mission of forward air control of strike aircraft for close air support and air interdiction. They saw extensive service during the Vietnam War flying the North American OV-10 Bronco. The Marine Corps began decommissioning the VMO squadrons following their participation in Operation Desert Storm as turboprop-driven aircraft were being perceived in the wake of that conflict as being too vulnerable to surface-to-air missiles, especially shoulder-launched man-portable air defense systems (MANPADS), to fly over modern battlefields. Their mission has been assumed by the VMFA(AW) squadrons flying the F/A-18D Hornet.

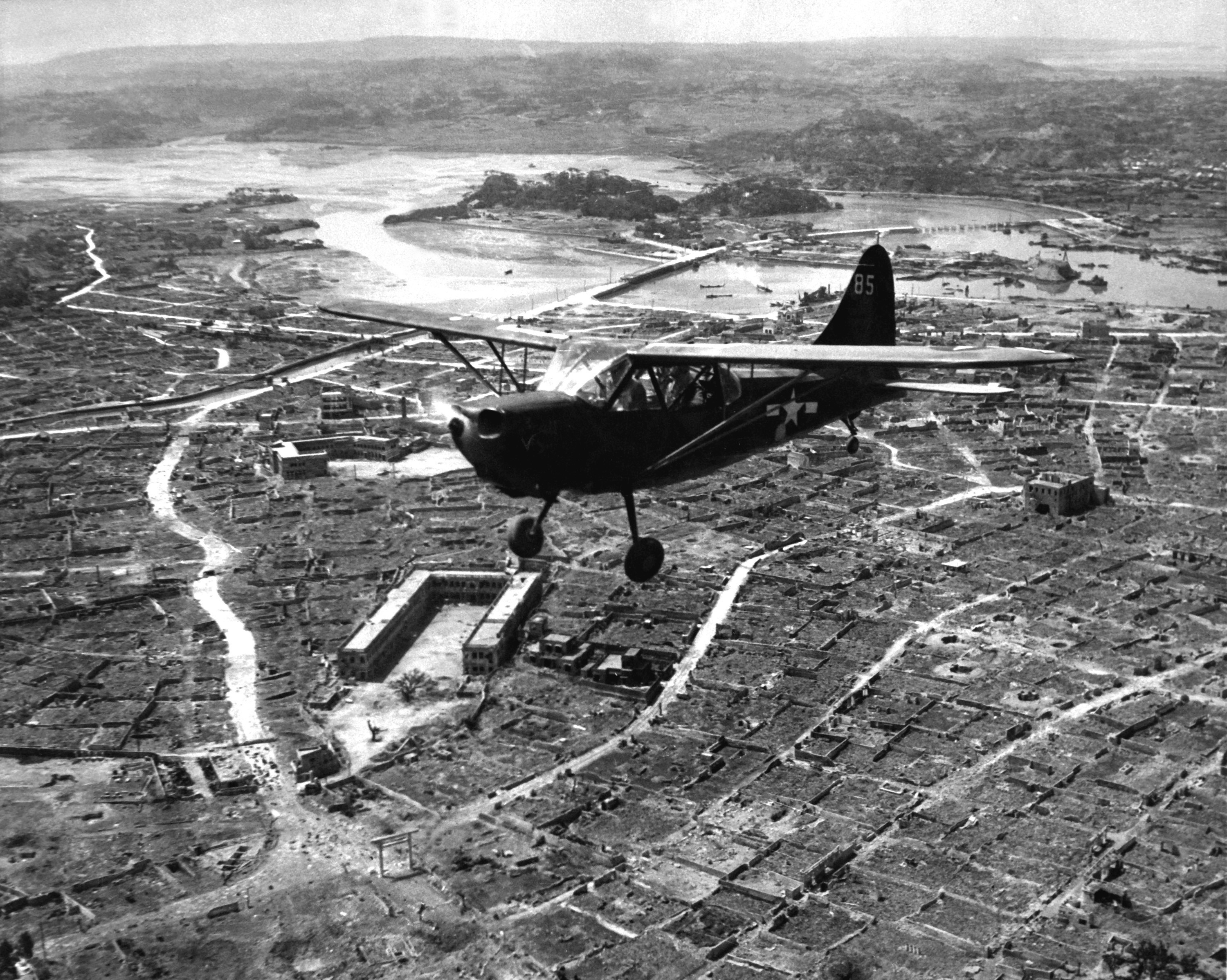
OY-1 Grasshopper

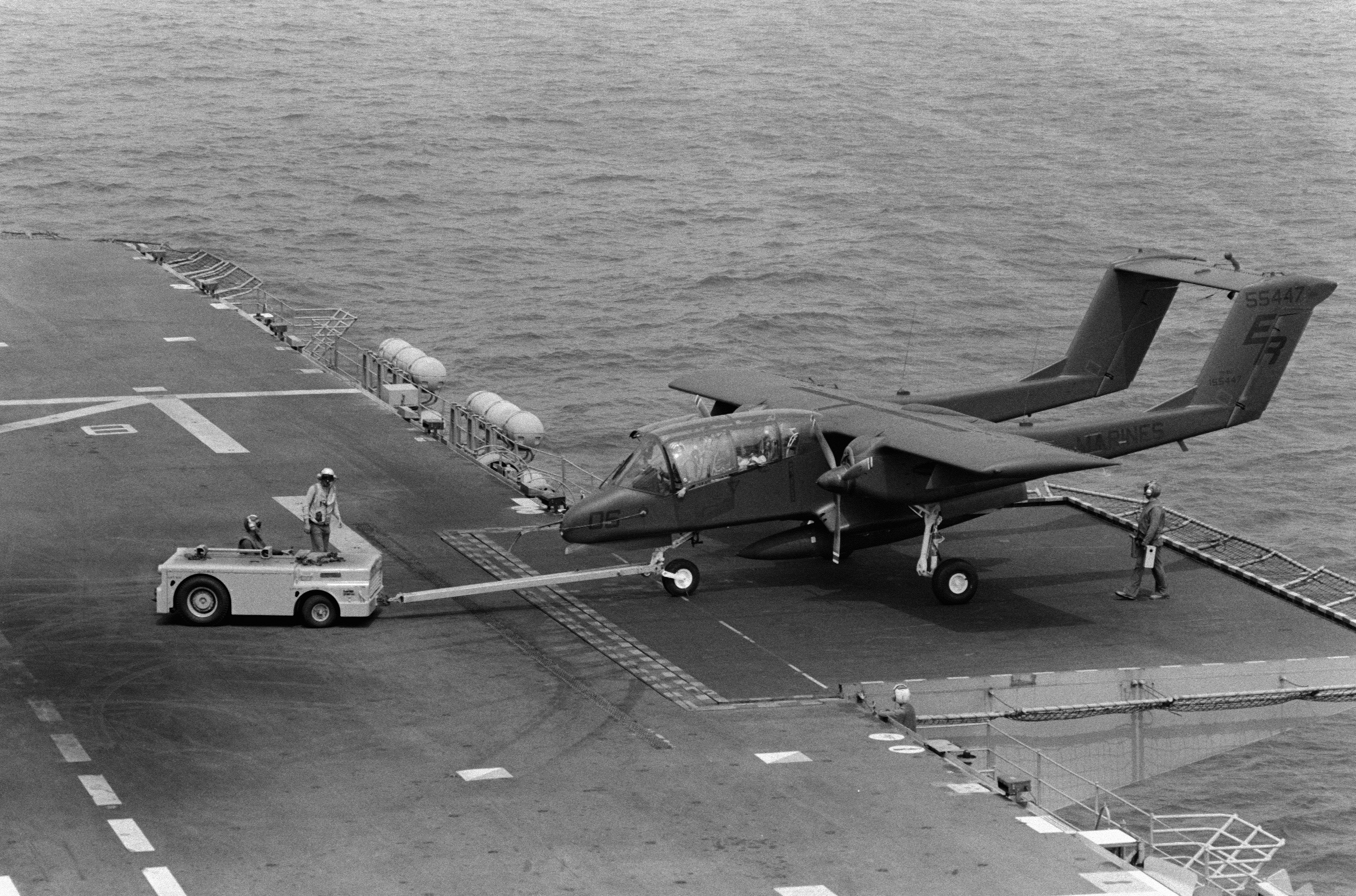
OV-10 Bronco of VMO-1

Squadron Name	Insignia	Nickname	Date Decommissioned	Source
VMO-1			31 July 1993	
VMO-2		Cherry Deuce	20 May 1993	
VMO-4		Evil Eyes	31 March 1994	
VMO-6		Tomcats	1 January 1976	
VMO-7			16 November 1945	
VMO-8			July 10, 1976	

=== Marine Attack Squadrons ===
In 1951, the Marine Corps began fielding the Douglas AD-1 Skyraider ground attack aircraft which had as its main role close air support for the Marines on the ground. Thus many squadrons had their designation changed from VMF to VMA to reflect this ground attack role. 13 squadrons were equipped with the Skyraider until they were finally phased out in 1958. Follow on VMA squadrons operated the A-4 Skyhawk during the Vietnam War through their retirement just after Operation Desert Storm. The VMA tradition is carried on today by squadrons flying the AV-8B Harrier II.

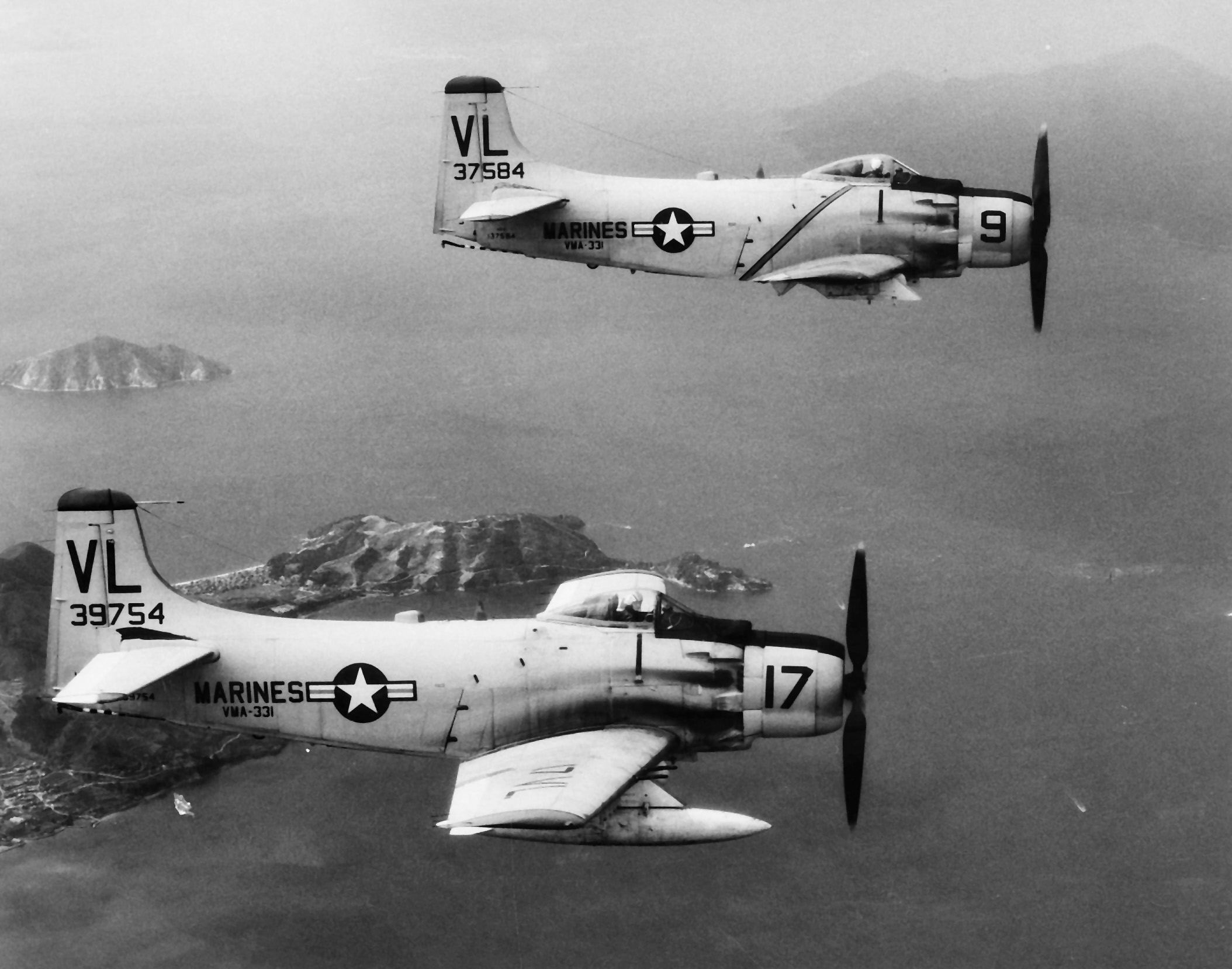
Douglas AD-6 Skyraiders of VMA-331

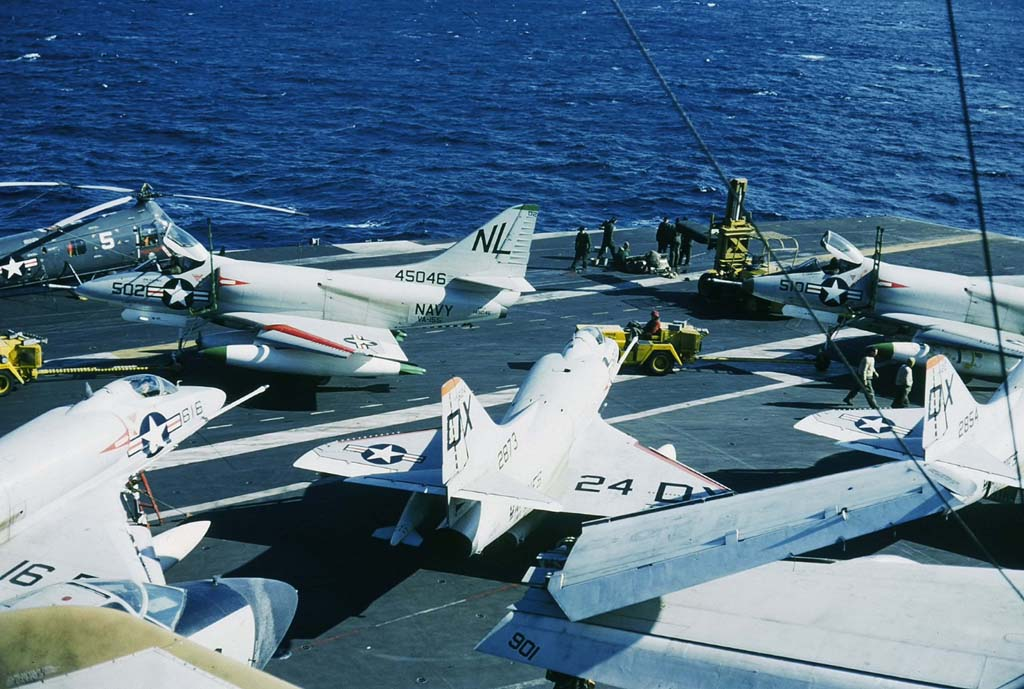
Douglas A-4B Skyhawks of VMA-324

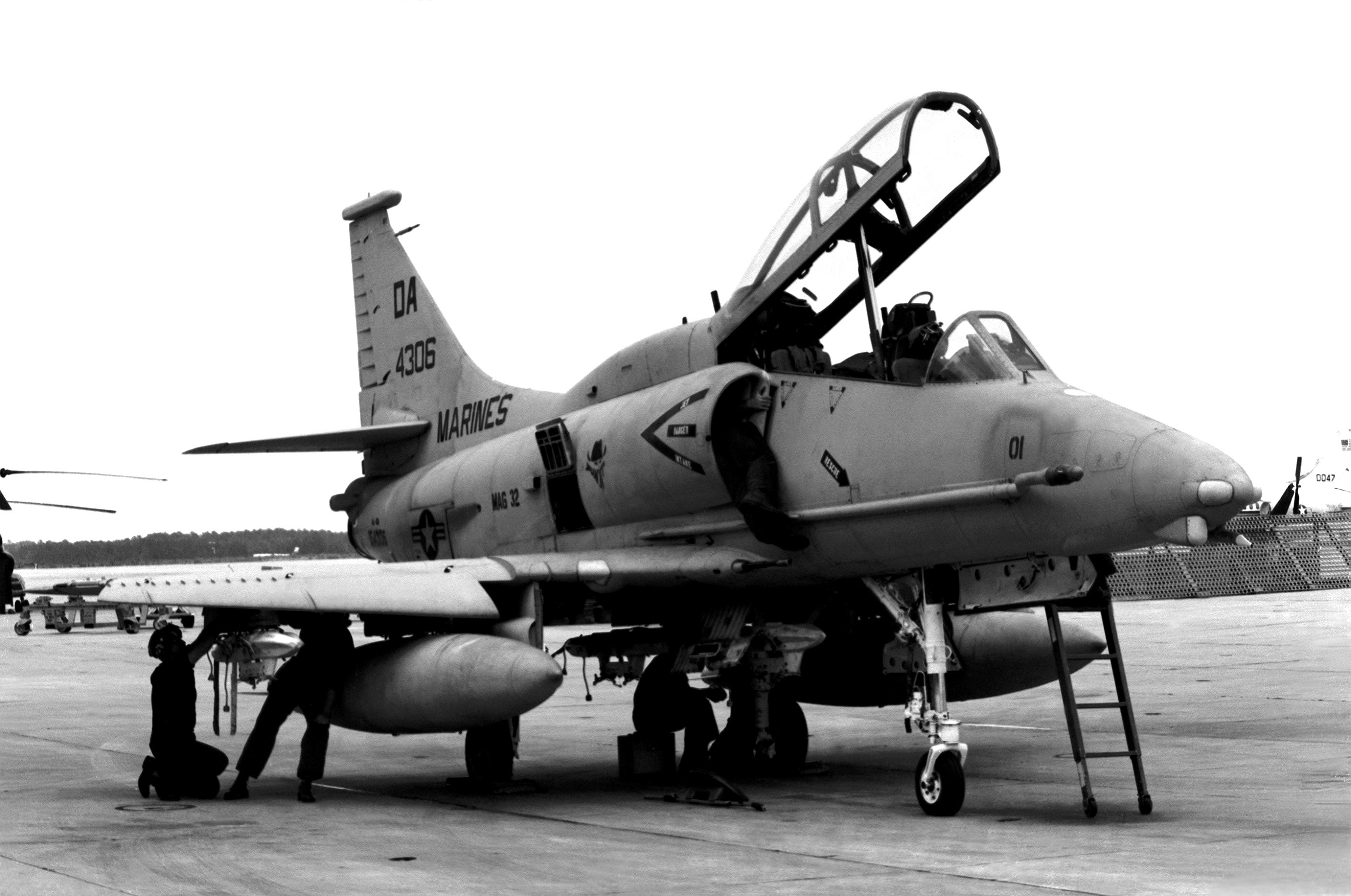
Douglas OA-4M Skyhawk of MAG-32

Squadron Name	Insignia	Nickname	Date Decommissioned	Source
VMA-123		Eight Balls	31 October 1965	
VMA-131		Diamondbacks	5 December 1998	
VMA-133		Dragons	30 September 1992	
VMA-141			1 September 1969	
VMA-143		Ragin Cajuns	30 June 1962	
VMA-144		Hensagliska	31 October 1965	
VMA-217		Max's Wild Hares	1964	
VMA-233		Flying Deadheads	1 July 1969	
VMA-236		Black Panthers	31 August 1962	
VMA-241		Sons of Satan	1 October 1969	
VMA-322		Fighting Gamecocks	27 June 1992	
VMA-324		Devildogs	29 August 1974	
VMA-331		Bumblebeess	1 October 1992	
VMA-543		Night Hawks	1 April 1974	
VMA-611			1 March 1969	

=== Marine Tactical Electronic Warfare Squadrons ===
VMAQ squadrons operated the EA-6B Prowler and were tasked with providing electronic attack, electronic counter-countermeasures, radar jamming and suppression of enemy air defense using the AN/ALQ-99 jamming pod and the AGM-88 HARM. Each of the four squadrons operated five aircraft and were land-based, although they were capable of landing on board U.S. Navy aircraft carriers. VMAQ-2 decommissioned on 8 March 2019 marking the end of active service for the VMAQs and the EA-6B Prowler.

Squadron Name	Insignia	Nickname	Date Decommissioned	Source
VMAQT-1		Banshees	29 April 2016	
VMAQ-2		Death Jesters	8 March. 2019	
VMAQ-3		Moon Dogs	11 May 2018	
VMAQ-4		Seahawks	2 June 2017	

=== Marine Reconnaissance Squadron ===
Marine Reconnaissance Squadron 4 was the only reserve photographic reconnaissance squadron in the Marine Corps. Initially based in Naval Air Station New Orleans, Louisiana they moved to Naval Air Station Olathe, Kansas 1 May 1967 and then again to Naval Air Station Dallas, Texas in 1970 when the reserves were reorganized. They flew Vought RF-8A Crusader until 1969 when all the planes were replaced with the Vought RF-8G Crusader.

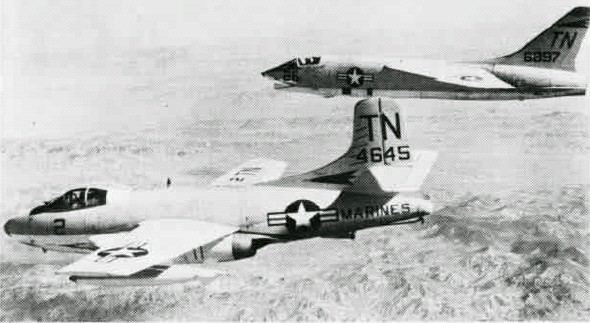
RF-8A and EF-10B of VMCJ-3.

Squadron Name	Insignia	Nickname	Date Decommissioned	Source
VMJ-4			1973	

=== Marine Composite Reconnaissance Squadrons ===
Following the Korean War Marine Composite Squadron 1 (VMC-1) and Marine Photographic Squadron 1 (VMJ-1) were combined to form VMCJ-1. The new squadron was responsible for both Photoreconnaissance and Electronic Warfare. In its early years it flew the Vought RF-8A Crusader and Douglas EF-10B Skyknight but these were later replaced by the McDonnell-Douglas RF-4B Phantom II and the Grumman EA-6A Electric Intruder. The squadron was decommissioned following the end of the Vietnam War and the reorganization of the Marine Corps' composite community in 1975.

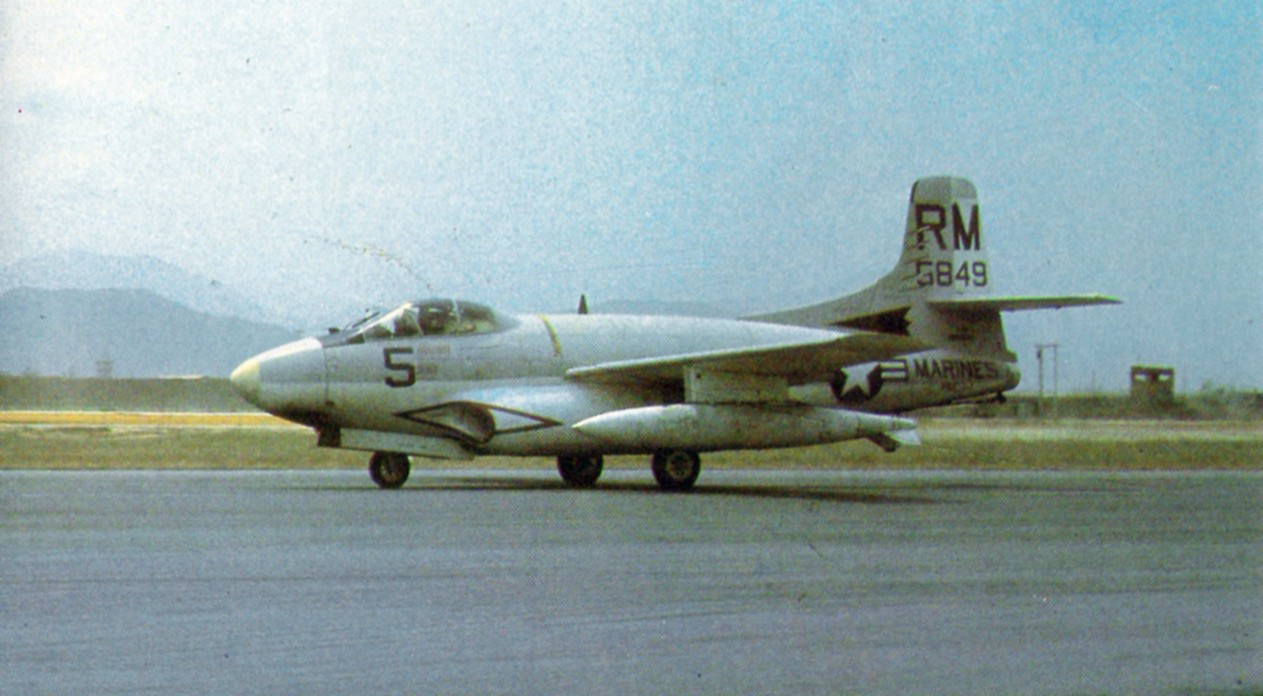
Douglas EF-10B Skyknight of VMCJ-1

Squadron Name	Insignia	Nickname	Date Decommissioned	Source
VMCJ-1		Golden Hawks	1 September 1975	

=== Marine Tactical Reconnaissance Squadron ===
Upon the decommissioning of the Marine Composite Squadrons (VMCJs), VMFP-3 became the lone photographic reconnaissance squadron in the Marine Corps. They flew the McDonnell-Douglas RF-4B Phantom II and operated from 1975 until being decommissioned in 1990. Their capability has since been replaced by various targeting pods used on Marine aircraft and the Advanced Tactical Airborne Reconnaissance System which is found in some of the McDonnell-Douglas F/A-18 Hornet squadrons.

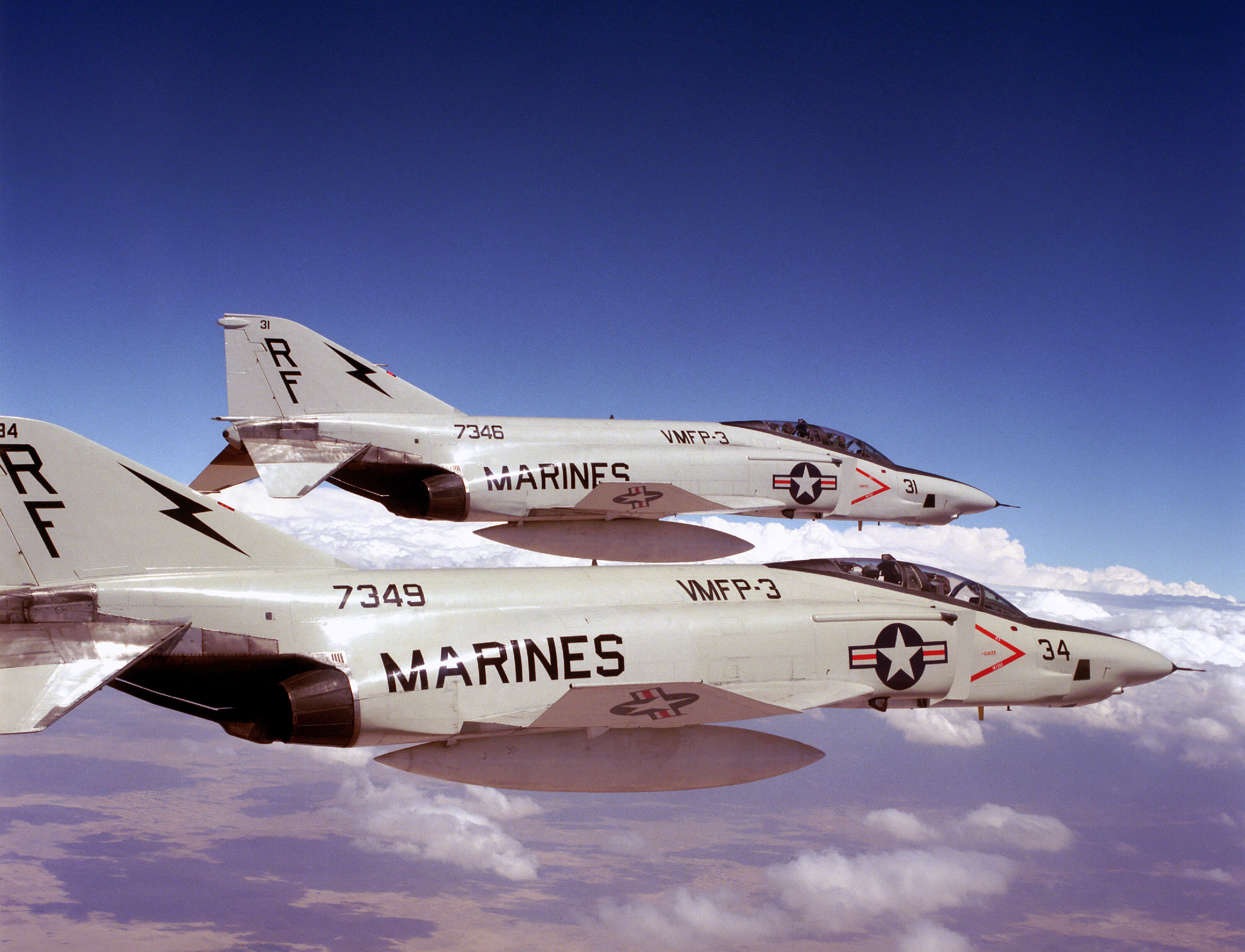
McDonnell-Douglas RF-4B Phantom IIs

Squadron Name	Insignia	Nickname	Date Decommissioned	Source
VMFP-3		Eyes of the Corps	3 September 1990	

=== Marine Fighter Attack Squadrons ===
The first Marine Corps squadron to be redesignated a VMFA was in June 1962 upon receipt of the first McDonnell-Douglas F-4 Phantom II aircraft. VMF and VMA squadrons were redesignated because the new Phantoms could be both fighter aircraft and ground attack aircraft. These squadrons were heavily deployed during the Vietnam War. Most of these squadrons would eventually convert to the McDonnell-Douglas F/A-18 Hornet with the last F-4 Phantom leaving service in 1992. The end of the Cold War saw the deactivation of some VMFA squadrons as part of the overall drawdown of the US Military

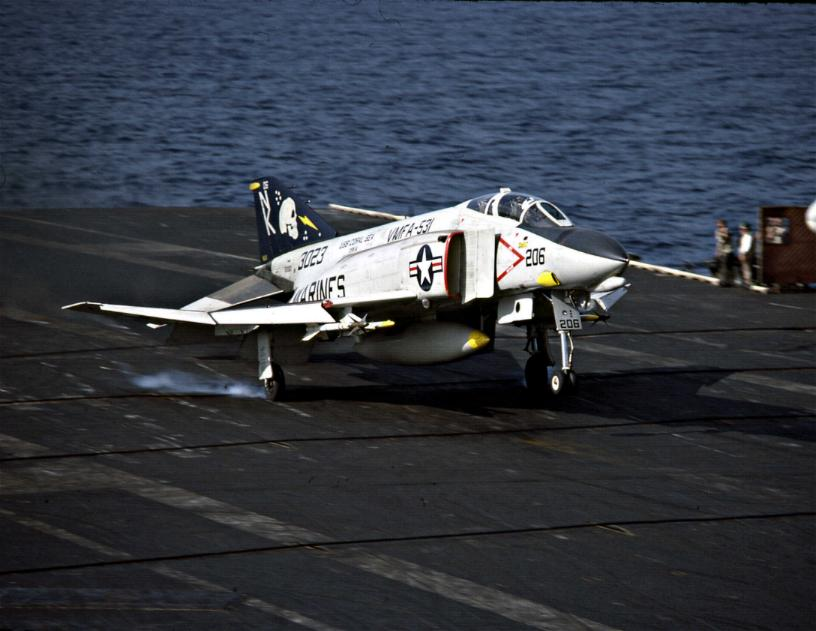
McDonnell-Douglas F-4 Phantom II of VMFA-531

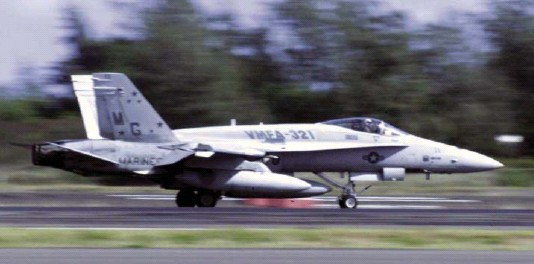
McDonnell-Douglas F/A-18A Hornet of VMFA-321

Squadron Name	Insignia	Nickname	Date Decommissioned	Source
VMFA-124		Whistling Death	19 June 1999	
VMFA-134		Smoke	1 April 2007	
VMFA-142		Gators	July 2008	
VMFA-212		Lancers	11 March 2008	
VMFA-235		Death Angels	14 June 1996	
VMFA-321		Hells Angels	30 September 2004	
VMFA-333		Fighting Shamrocks	31 March 1992	
VMFA-334		Falcons	30 December 1971	
VMFA-351			1978	
VMFA-531		Grey Ghosts	27 April 1992	

=== Marine All-Weather Fighter Attack Squadron ===
Squadron Name	Insignia	Nickname	Date Decommissioned	Source
VMFA(AW)-332		Moonlighters	30 March 2007	

=== Marine Heavy Helicopter Squadrons ===
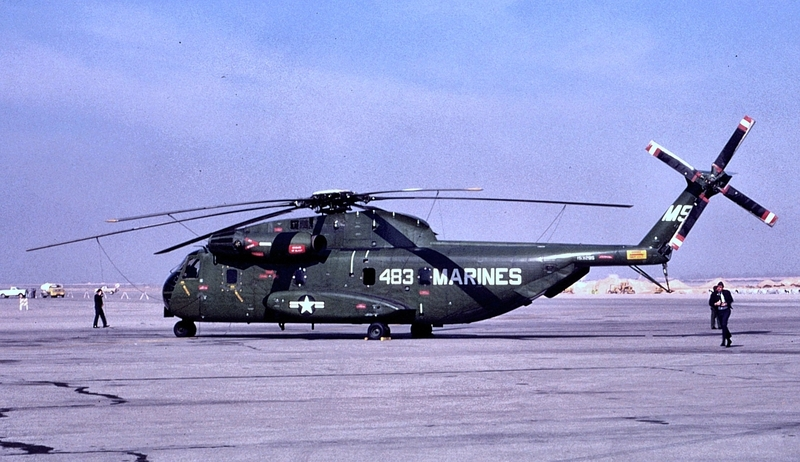
CH-53A of HMH-769

Squadron Name	Insignia	Nickname	Date Decommissioned	Source
HMH-463		Pegasus	22 April 2022	
HMH-366		Hammerheads	16 December 2022	
HMH-769		Titan	2 August 2008	
HMH-777		Flying Armadillos	1980	

=== Marine Medium Helicopter Squadrons ===
The original Marine Medium Helicopter squadrons flew the Sikorsky UH-34D Sea Horse, which shortly after its inception saw extensive combat during the Vietnam War. Beginning in 1966 they began to be replaced with the CH-46 Sea Knight which was faster, could carry more troops and is still in service today. The decommissioned HMM squadrons reflect the UH-34D training squadron and various reserve squadrons.

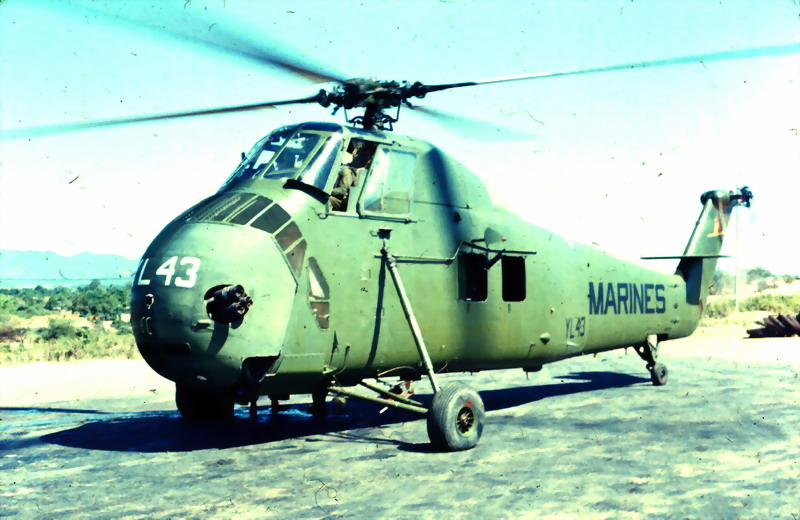
UH-34D Sea Horse

Squadron Name	Insignia	Nickname	Date Decommissioned	Source
HMM-761			31 August 1962	
HMM-762			31 December 1962	
HMM-763			30 September 1962	
HMM-766		Beavers	1 October 1976	
HMM-768			1976	

=== Marine Light Helicopter Squadrons ===
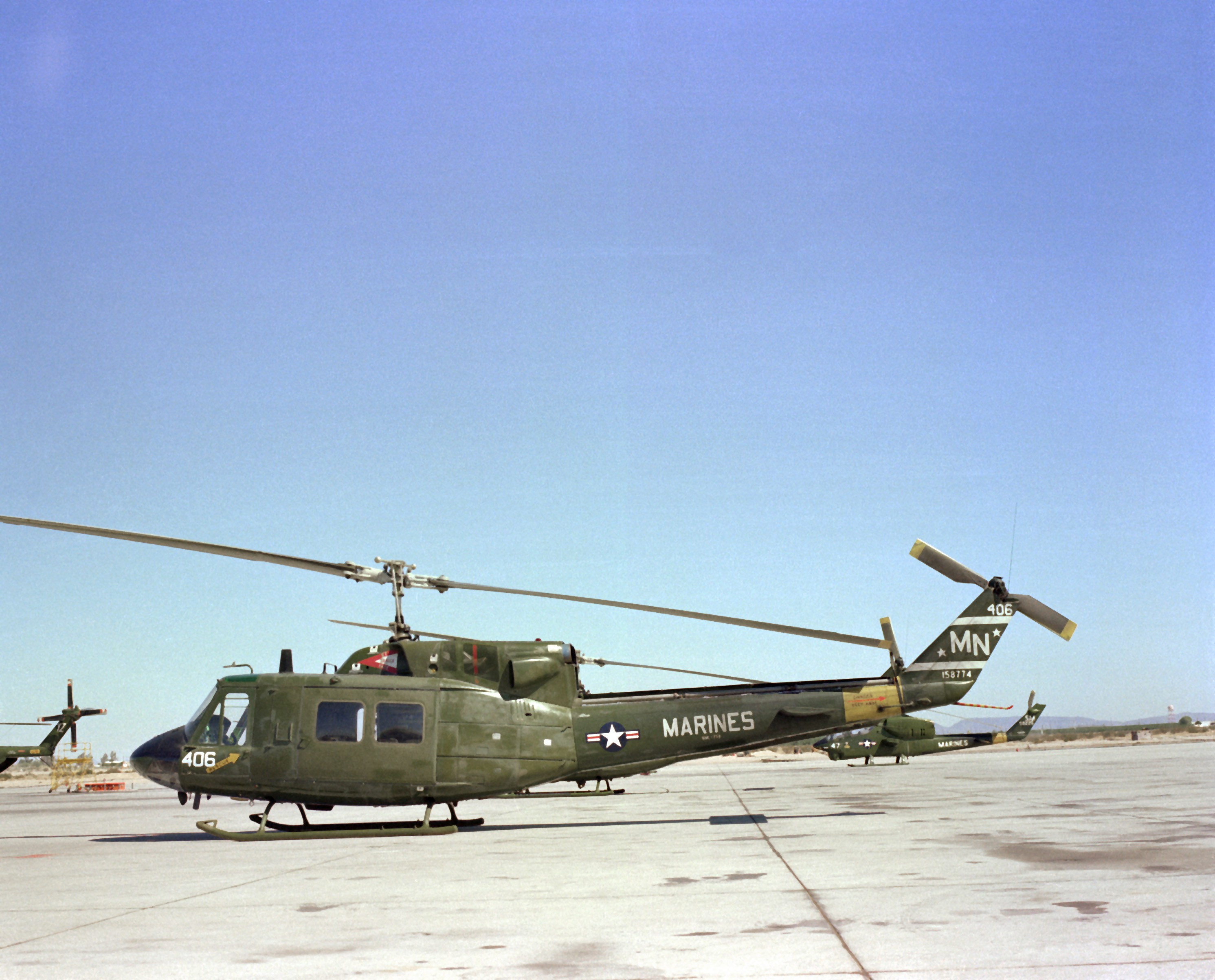
Bell UH-1N Huey from HML-770

Squadron Name	Insignia	Nickname	Date Decommissioned	Source
HML-765			30 June 1976	
HML-767		Nomads	1 August 1994	
HMM-770		Stingers	1980	
HML-771		Hummers	1 August 1994	
HML-776		Gangsters	1 July 1994	

=== Marine Light Attack Helicopter Squadrons ===
The Marine Corps’ light attack squadrons (HMLAs) are composite squadrons usually made up of 12 Bell AH-1Z Cobras and 6 Bell UH-1Y Hueys. The primary missions of the Cobra is close air support, forward air control, reconnaissance and armed escort, while the Huey provided airborne command and control, utility support, supporting arms coordination and medical evacuation. These squadrons were first formed during the Vietnam War with the fielding of the Bell AH-1 Cobra gunship and its being combined in the same squadron with the UH-1H Iroquois that initially belonged to the Marine Corps' VMO squadrons. The majority of these squadrons are still active in the Fleet Marine Force today.

Squadron Name	Insignia	Nickname	Date Decommissioned	Source
HMLA-467		Sabers	16 June 2016	
HMLA-469		Vengeance	16 December 2022	

=== Marine Medium Tiltrotor Squadron ===
Marine tiltrotor squadrons operate the MV-22 Osprey with their main mission being assault support. The Osprey offers twice the speed, five times the range, and can fly more than twice as high as the CH-46 Sea Knight it replaced. The Marine Corps has 18 operational Osprey squadrons as of April 2018.

Squadron Name	Insignia	Nickname	Date Decommissioned	Source
VMM-166		Sea Elk	1 October 2021	
VMM-264		Black Knights	24 June 2020	
VMM-561		Pale Horses	7 July 2012	

=== Training squadrons ===
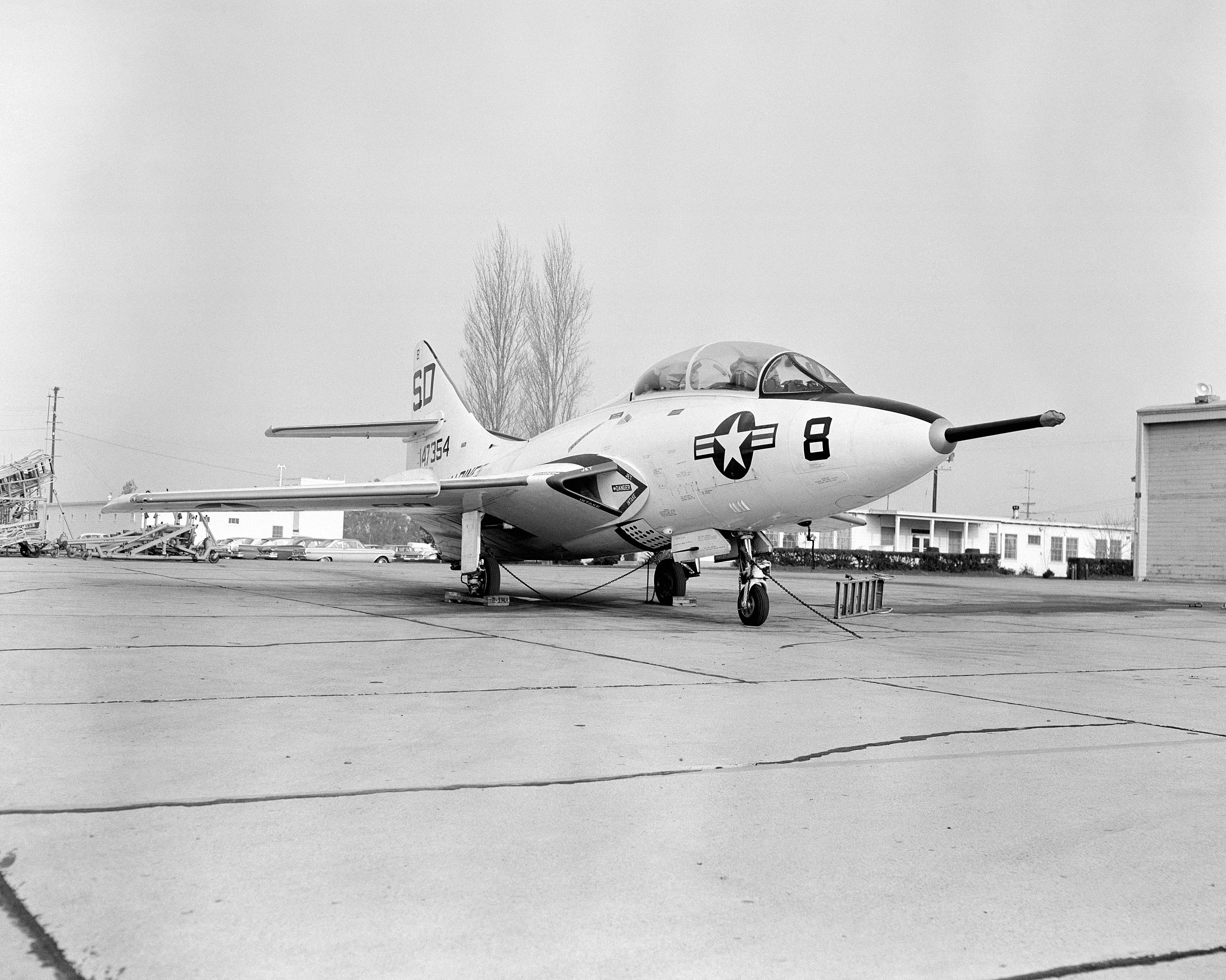
Grumman TF-9J Cougar of VMT-103 at MCAS El Toro in 1965.

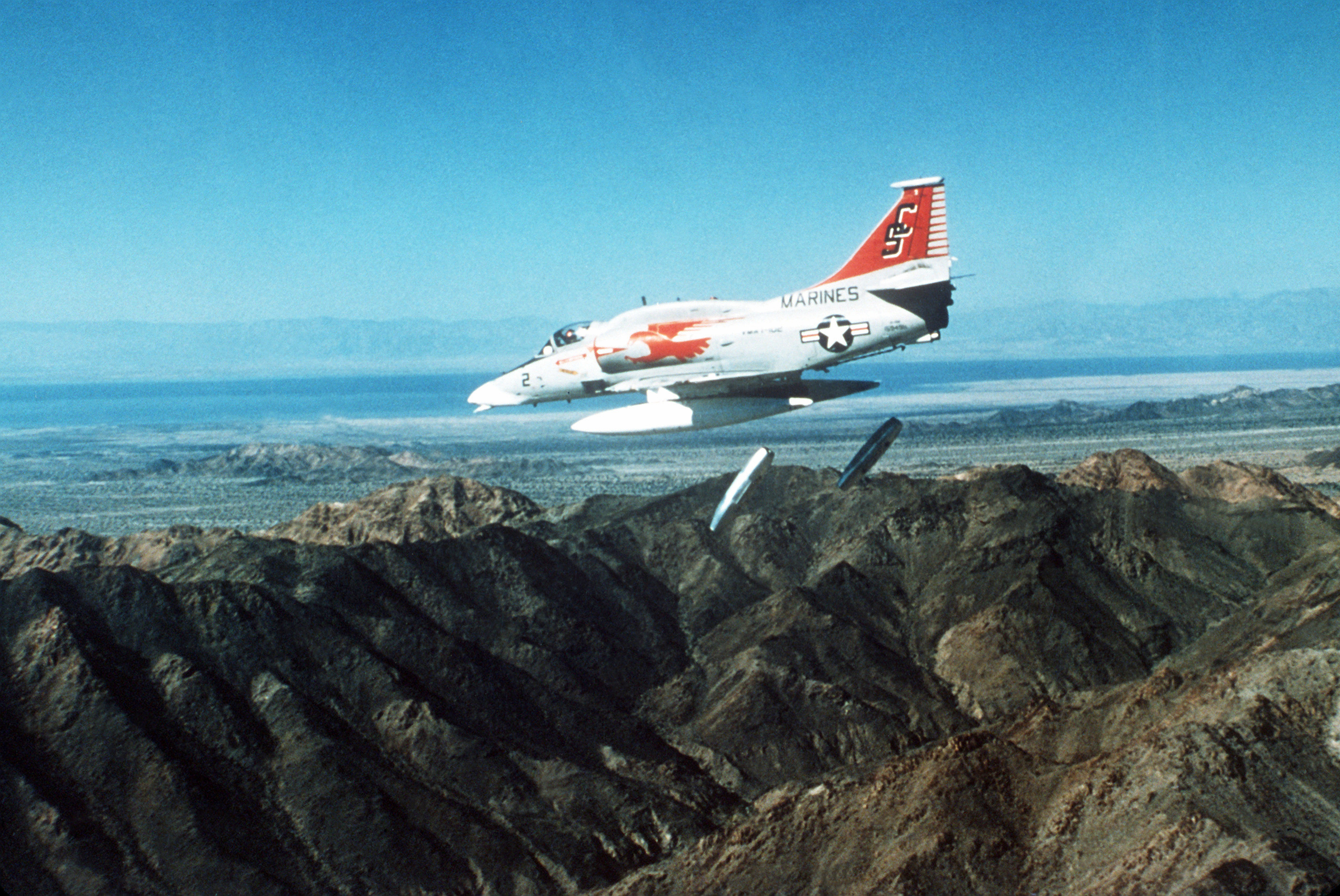
Douglas A-4M Skyhawk of VMAT-102

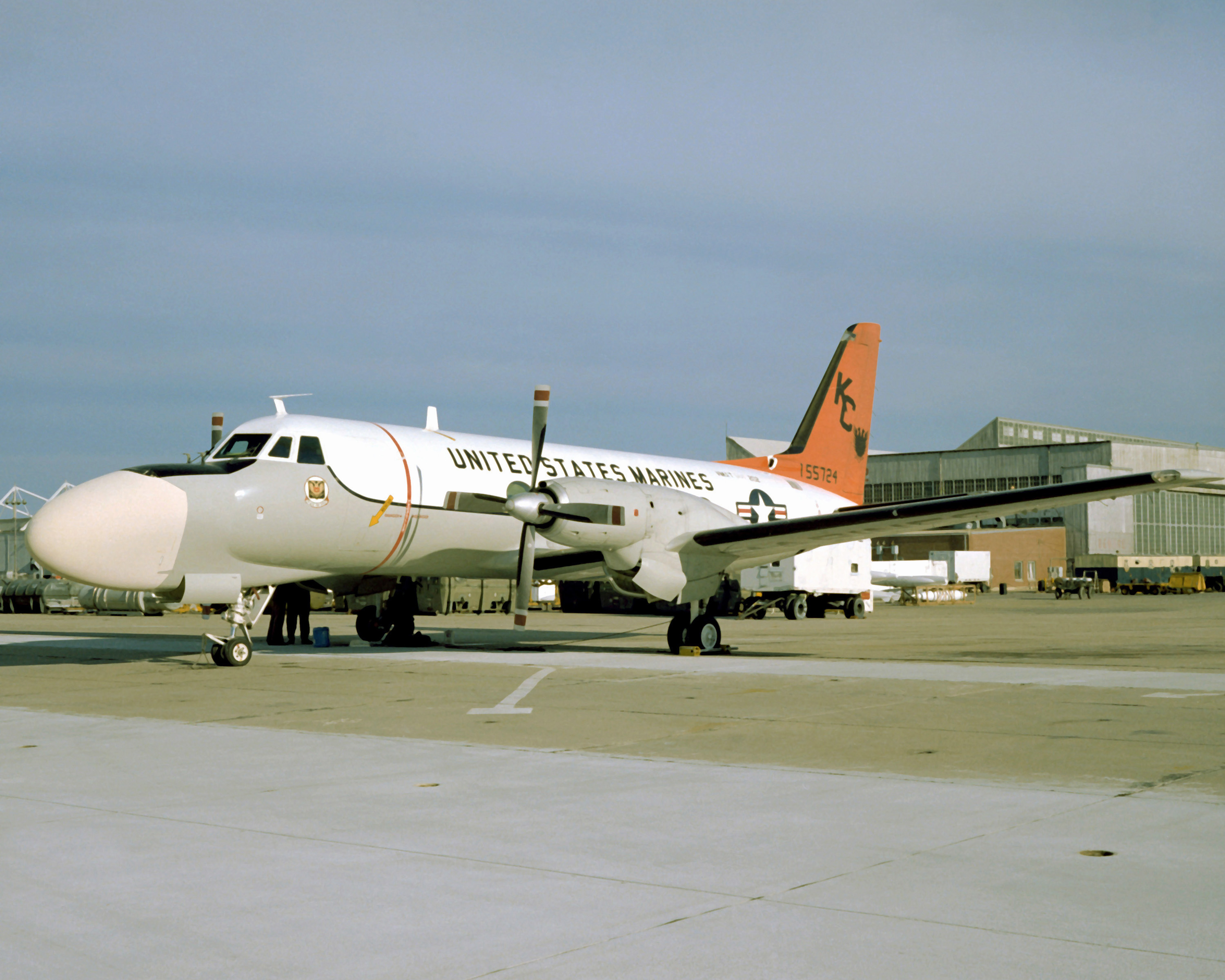
Grumman TC-4C Academe from VMAT(AW)-202

Squadron Name	Insignia	Nickname	Date Decommissioned	Source
VMAT-20; Marine Attack Training Squadron			June 23, 1958	
VMFAT-101; Marine Fighter Attack Training Squadron		Sharpshooters	September 29, 2023	
VMAT-102; Marine Attack Training Squadron		Skyhawks	October 1, 1987	
VMT-103; Marine Training Squadron		Sky Chickens	May 31, 1972	
VMFAT-201; Marine Fighter Attack Training Squadron		Hawks	September 30, 1974	
VMAT(AW)-202; Marine All-Weather Attack Training Squadron		Double Eagles	September 30, 1986	
VMAT-203; Marine Attack Training Squadron		Hawks	October 29, 2021	
VMGRT-253; Marine Aerial Refueler Transport Training Squadron		Titans	September 14, 2006	
HMT-301; Marine Helicopter Training Squadron		Windwalkers	June 3, 2005	
HMHT-401; Marine Heavy Helicopter Training Squadron			May 1, 1972	
HMMT-402; Marine Medium Helicopter Training Squadron			May 1, 1972	

== See also ==
- United States Marine Corps Aviation
- List of United States Marine Corps battalions
- List of United States Marine Corps aircraft wings
- List of active United States Marine Corps aircraft squadrons
