= VMF-313 =

Marine Fighting Squadron 313
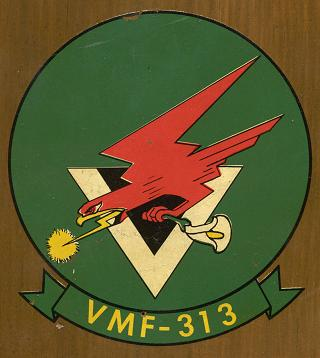
- VMF-313 Insignia
- Active: 1 October 1943 – 1 June 1945; N/A - 1950s
- Country: United States
- Allegiance: United States of America
- Branch: United States Marine Corps
- Type: Fighter squadron
- Role: Air interdiction Close air support
- Part of: Inactive
- Nickname: Lily Packin' Hellbirds AKA Lily Packin' Death Falcons
- Engagements: World War II * Philippines Campaign, 1944-45

Marine Fighting Squadron 313 (VMF-313) was a reserve fighter squadron in the United States Marine Corps. They were a part of the 4th Marine Aircraft Wing and stationed at Naval Air Station New York. Also known as the "Lily Packin' Hellbirds" and the "Lilly Packin' Death Falcons", they fought in World War II mainly during the Philippines Campaign, 1944-45. The squadron was decommissioned in the 1950s.

== History ==
=== World War II ===
VMF-313 was commissioned at Marine Corps Air Station El Centro on 1 October 1943. They trained there until May 1944 when they moved to Midway Island in the Pacific Ocean. There they continued to train including training with Charles Lindbergh in April 1944. In July 1944, the squadron flew to Emirau in the Solomon Islands and began to attack Japanese shipping in the area around Kavieng.

They arrived at Tacloban Airfield on Leyte on 3 December 1944 as part of Marine Aircraft Group 12. During the Philippines Campaign, 1944-45 the squadron lost 16 of its Vought F4U Corsairs. In one notable incident while in the Philippines, Major Theodore Olsen, took off in a plane that had over 300 patches from earlier missions. The plane failed while airborne and Olsen was killed after he hit the tail while bailing out.

During the War, VMF-313 was credited with destroying nine enemy aircraft in aerial combat.

=== 1950 ===
The squadron was reactivated following World War II becoming part of the Marine Forces Reserve and were based out of New York state. They were decommissioned during the 1950s.

== Unit awards ==
A unit citation or commendation is an award bestowed upon an organization for the action cited. Members of the unit who participated in said actions are allowed to wear on their uniforms the awarded unit citation. VMF-313 was presented with the following awards:

Ribbon	Unit Award
	Presidential Unit Citation
	Navy Unit Commendation
	Asiatic-Pacific Campaign Medal
	World War II Victory Medal
	National Defense Service Medal with one Bronze Star

== See also ==
- United States Marine Corps Aviation
- List of active United States Marine Corps aircraft squadrons
- List of decommissioned United States Marine Corps aircraft squadrons
