= VMM-561 =

Marine Medium Tiltrotor Squadron 561
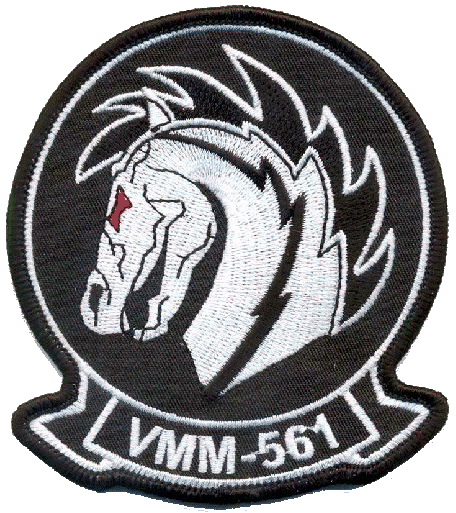
- VMM-561 insignia
- Active: 31 January 1967—27 October 1969; 2 December 2010—7 July 2012
- Country: United States
- Branch: United States Marine Corps
- Type: Medium-lift Tiltrotor Squadron
- Role: Assault Support, CASEVAC
- Part of: Marine Aircraft Group 16
- Garrison/HQ: Marine Corps Air Station Miramar
- Nickname: "Pale Horse"

Commanders
- Current commander: LtCol Warren J. Curry

Insignia
- Theme song: Paint It Black
- Tail Code: PH

Aircraft flown
- Multirole helicopter: UH-34 Sea Horse; Bell-Boeing V-22 Osprey

Marine Medium Tiltrotor Squadron 561 (VMM-561) was a medium-lift squadron of the United States Marine Corps flying the Bell-Boeing V-22 Osprey. Known as the "Pale Horse", it was part of Marine Aircraft Group 16 and based out of Marine Corps Air Station Miramar in California. They were scheduled to move to Okinawa in 2012. The squadron previously served as a training unit during the Vietnam War but was previously deactivated with the retirement of the HUSS from active service.

== History ==
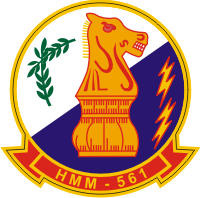
Squadron logo from the 1960s

Marine Medium Helicopter Squadron 561 (HMM-561) was activated on 31 January 1967, to provide refresher training to UH-34 Sea Horse pilots and crews heading to Vietnam. The squadron, based at Marine Corps Air Facility Santa Ana, fell under the command of Marine Aircraft Group 56 and the 3rd Marine Aircraft Wing. Undermanned from the start, the unit remained in cadre status until 9 May 1968 when they were formally stood up. In addition to training, the squadron's mission also included conducting local Search and Rescue missions, providing VIP transport, and other commitments as required by local commands.

Starting in January 1969, UH-34 deployments started to slow down as the Marine Corps transitioned its remaining squadrons to the CH-46 Sea Knight. The squadron was decommissioned on 27 October 1969 and was the last active UH-34 squadron in the Fleet Marine Force. Squadron members were absorbed by the other helicopter communities or given the Marine Air Reserve Training Detachment (MARTD) of their choice as a next duty station.

The squadron was reactivated as VMM-561 on 2 December 2010, after 18 months as a cadre unit. VMM-561 was deactivated on 6 July 2012 and replaced at Miramar by VMM-363.

== Unit award ==
A unit citation or commendation is an award bestowed upon an organization for the action cited. Members of the unit who participated in said actions are allowed to wear on their uniforms the awarded unit citation. VMM-561 was presented with the following awards and campaign streamers:

Streamer	Award
	National Defense Service Medal

== See also ==
- United States Marine Corps Aviation
- List of decommissioned United States Marine Corps aircraft squadrons
- List of active United States Marine Corps aircraft squadrons
