= VMFA-351 =

Marine Fighter Attack Squadron 351
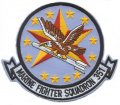
- VMF-351 Insignia
- Active: 1 March 1943 – 9 November 1945; 1 July 1946 - 22 May 1976; 1977 - 1978
- Country: United States of America
- Branch: United States Marine Corps
- Type: Attack
- Role: Close air support Air interdiction Aerial reconnaissance
- Part of: Deactivated
- Tail Code: MC
- Engagements: World War II; Battle of Okinawa

Marine Fighter Attack Squadron 351 (VMFA-351) was a fighter squadron in the Marine Forces Reserve. The squadron was based at Naval Air Station Atlanta and participated in action during World War II and was decommissioned in 1975.

== History ==
=== World War II ===
The squadron was originally activated as Marine Observation Squadron 351 (VMO-351) on 1 March 1943 at Marine Corps Air Station Cherry Point, North Carolina. The squadron was moved to Bogue Field in May 1944 and was assigned to Marine Aircraft Group 51 (MAG-51). They trained to take part in Operation Crossbow - Project Danny which was a plan to have carrier based Marine squadrons attack German V-1 Rocket sites. This plan was cancelled and in September 1944 the squadron moved to Marine Corps Air Station Mojave.

In early December 1944, VMO-351 went aboard the USS Ranger for carrier qualifications. During this time they were redesignated VMO(CVS)-351. Following qualification they embarked aboard the USS Commencement Bay and were quickly redesignated Marine Fighting Squadron 351 (VMF-351) in February 1945. During its combat tour the squadron provided aerial cover for minesweeping activity and bomber strikes in the East China Sea area. In April 1945, VMF-351 participated in the Battle of Okinawa flying F4U Corsairs from the USS Cape Gloucester. Because aerial combat was a rarity during the later stages of the war the squadron was only credited with downing three enemy aircraft in aerial combat. They were deactivated upon their return to the United States on 9 November 1945.

=== Reserve duty ===
The squadron was quickly reactivated as part of the Marine Air Reserve on 1 July 1946 and were based out of Naval Air Station Atlanta, Georgia. During the Korean War the squadron was reduced to paper strength as its pilots and groundcrew were transferred to other units to bring them up to strength. The squadron was able to resume operation in July 1951 after receiving new personnel.

VMF-351 was redesignated Marine Attack Squadron 351 (VMA-351) in 1958 after they were re-equipped with the AD-4 Skyraider. This lasted until 1962 when they transitioned aircraft to the FJ-4 Fury and once again became VMF-351.

In 1965 they transitioned from the FJ Fury to the F-8 Crusader. They shared their aircraft with Naval Reserve squadrons VF-672 and VF-673. When the Naval Air Reserve was reorganized in 1970, they became an independent squadron. As part of the draw down of US troop levels following the Vietnam War, the squadron was deactivated on 22 May 1976. They were reactivated in 1977, transitioned to the F-4 Phantom and were redesignated VMFA-351 however were quickly decommissioned the next year.

== See also ==
- United States Marine Corps Aviation
- List of active United States Marine Corps aircraft squadrons
- List of decommissioned United States Marine Corps aircraft squadrons
