= VMTB-151 =

Marine Torpedo Bombing Squadron 151
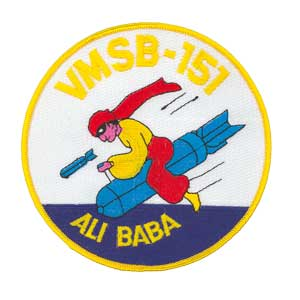
- VMSB-151 Insignia
- Active: 1 July 1937 – 20 March 1946
- Country: United States
- Branch: USMC
- Type: Fighter squadron
- Role: Dive bombing
- Part of: Inactive
- Engagements: World War II

Aircraft flown
- Bomber: Curtiss SBC Helldiver; Douglas SBD Dauntless; Curtiss SB2C Helldiver

Marine Torpedo Bombing Squadron 151 (VMTB-151) was a dive bombing squadron in the United States Marine Corps. The squadron fought in World War II but was quickly deactivated after the war, on 20 March 1946.

== History ==
The squadron was commissioned on 1 July 1937, as VMO-1, at Marine Corps Base Quantico. It was redesignated Marine Observation Squadron 151 (VMO-151) on 1 July 1941. The squadron left for San Diego, California in December 1941 with the rest of the 1st Marine Aircraft Wing, but returned to MCB Quantico in January 1942. From January to April, it trained at Naval Station Norfolk until departing for Tafuna Airfield in American Samoa on 9 April 1942. It arrived a month later and remained for the next 13 months. On 15 September 1942, the squadron was re-designated again, this time as Marine Scout Bombing Squadron 151 (VMSB-151).

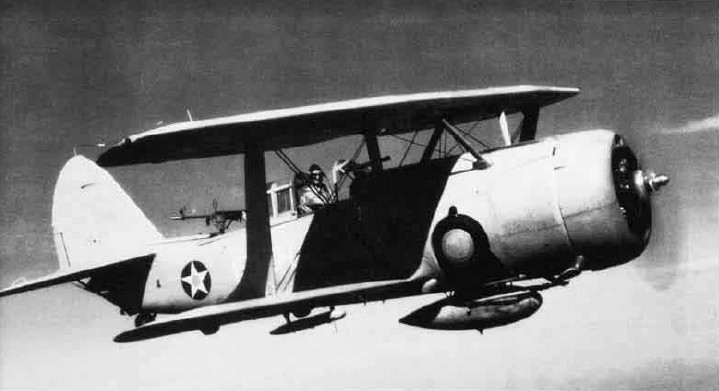
VMO-151 retired the last active Curtiss SBC-4 Helldivers in June 1943.

On 10 June 1943, the squadron moved to Uvea Island in the Wallis Group. The squadron remained there until 29 February 1944 when it arrived at Engebi. From 9–12 March, the squadron covered Marine landings on Wotho Atoll, Ujae Atoll and Lae Atoll. During this time, it also made bombing runs against bypassed Japanese bases in the Marshall Islands until 31 May 1945. On 9 June 1945, the squadron returned to the United States.

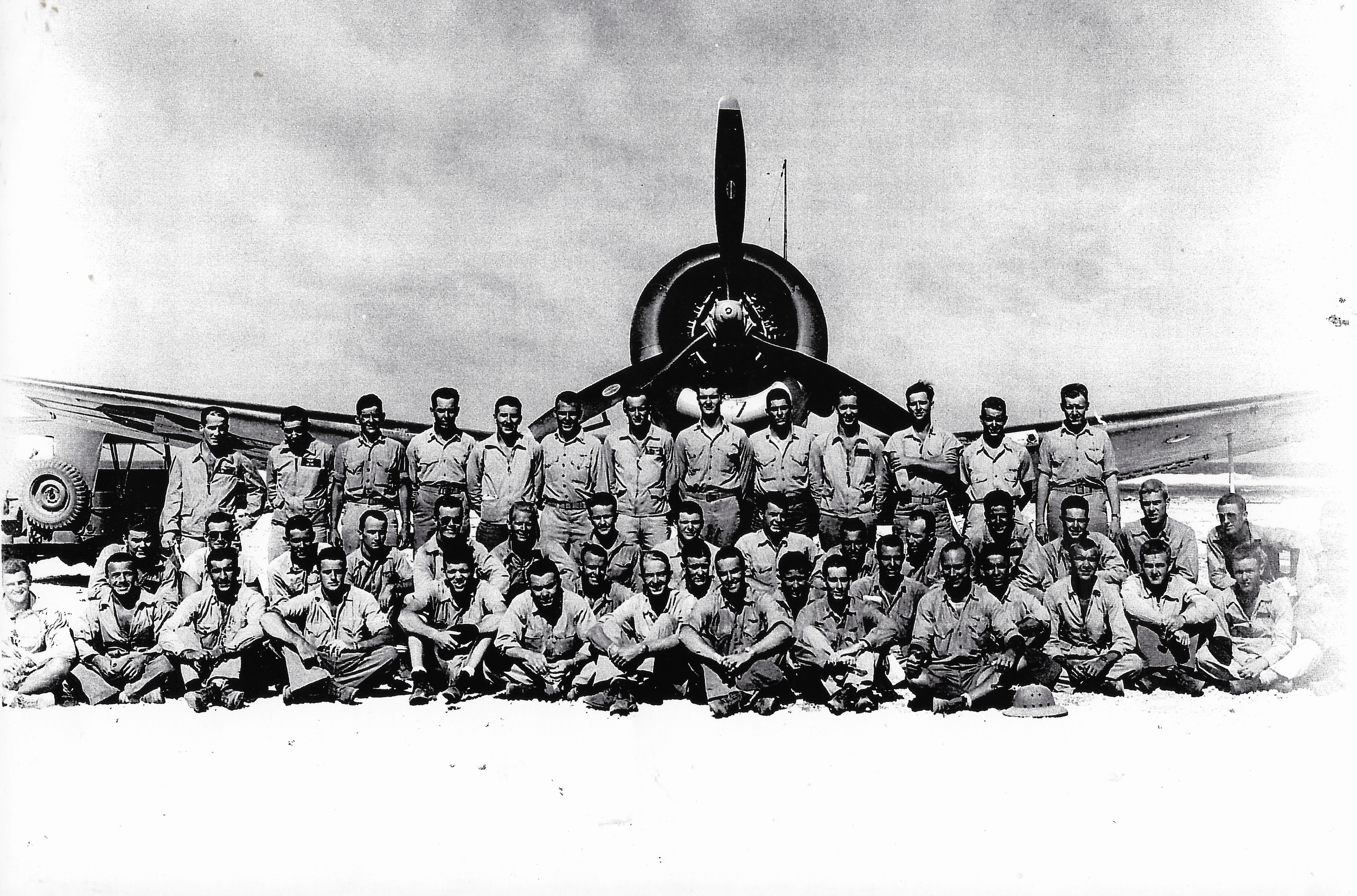
VMSB-151 at Engebi Island in June 1944

Upon return to Marine Corps Air Station Mojave, it was assigned to Marine Air Support Group 51 and was redesignated Marine Torpedo Bombing Squadron 151 (VMTB-151). on 30 June 1945. The squadron was deactivated at Marine Corps Air Station Santa Barbara, California on 20 March 1946.

== See also ==
- United States Marine Corps Aviation
- List of active United States Marine Corps aircraft squadrons
- List of decommissioned United States Marine Corps aircraft squadrons
