= VMSB-342 =

Marine Scout Bombing Squadron 342
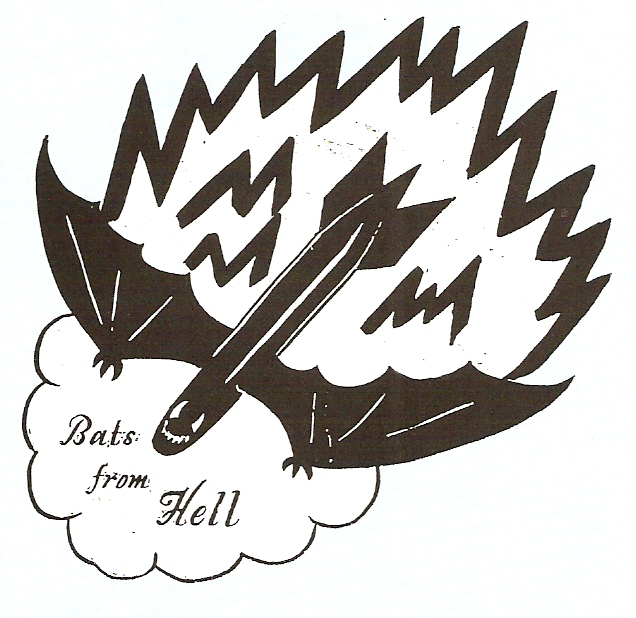
- VMSB-342 insignia
- Active: – July 1, 1943 - October 10, 1944
- Country: United States of America
- Branch: United States Marine Corps
- Type: Dive Bomber squadron
- Role: Reconnaissance; Air Interdiction; Close air support
- Nickname: "Bats from Hell"

Aircraft flown
- Bomber: SBD Dauntless

Marine Scout Bombing Squadron 342 (VMSB-342) was a dive bomber squadron in the United States Marine Corps. The squadron, also known as the “Bats from Hell”, was active during World War II but never saw combat in the Pacific Theater. The squadron were decommissioned on October 10, 1944.

== History ==
Marine Scout Bombing Squadron 342 was commissioned on July 1, 1943, at Marine Corps Air Station Cherry Point, North Carolina. During November 1943, the squadron moved up to Marine Corps Auxiliary Airfield Atlantic and was assigned to Marine Aircraft Group 33. Some of the squadron's pilots departed for follow on training at Boca Chica Key, Florida, the site of what today is Naval Air Station Key West. In August 1944, the squadron with its twenty SBD dive bombers again transferred, this time to Marine Corps Air Station Newport, Arkansas where it joined Marine Aircraft Group 94. VMSB-remained until it was decommissioned on October 10, 1944.

== See also ==
- United States Marine Corps Aviation
- List of active United States Marine Corps aircraft squadrons
- List of decommissioned United States Marine Corps aircraft squadrons
