= VMF(N)-532 =

Marine Night Fighter Squadron 532
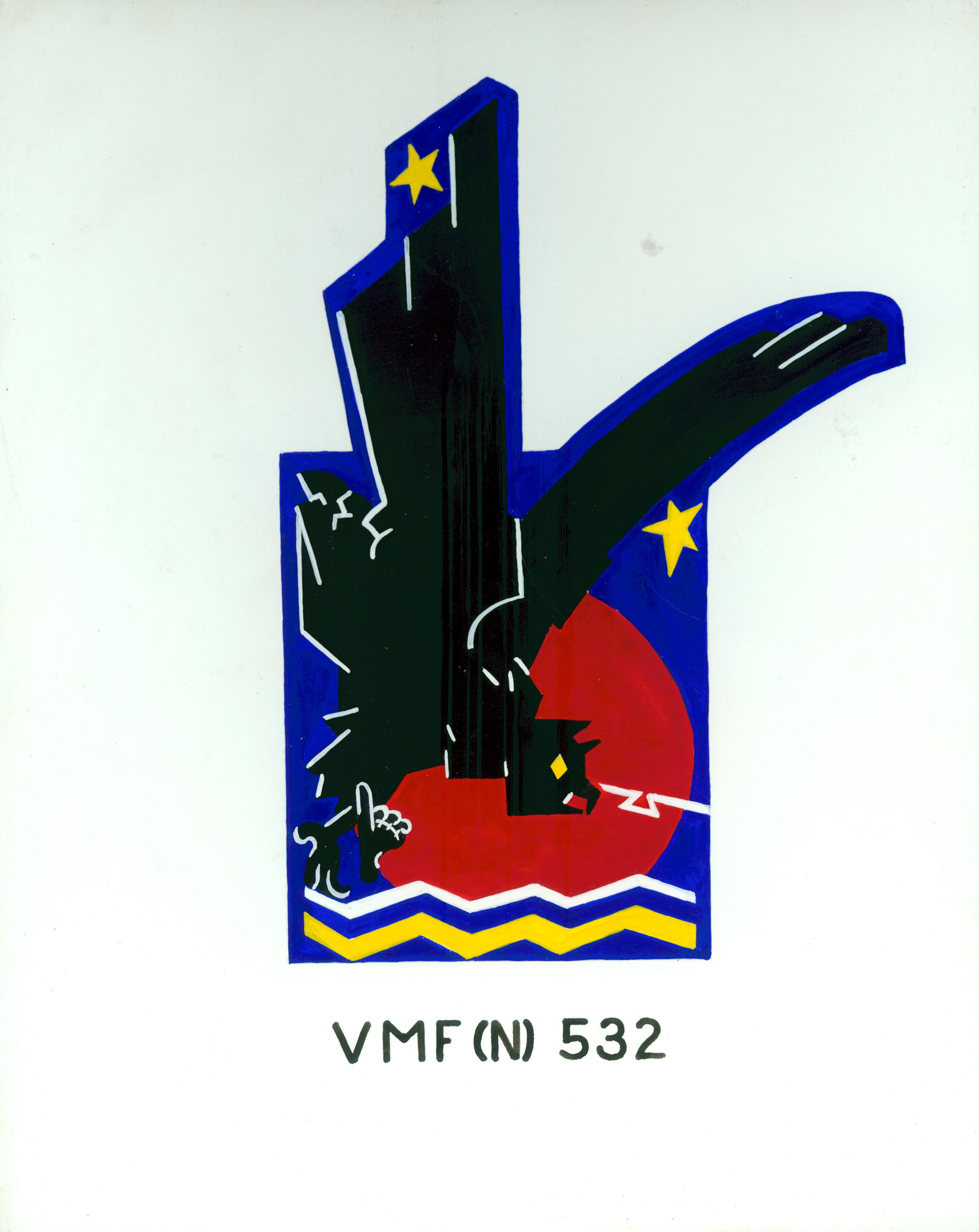
- VMF(N)-532 Insignia circa 1943
- Active: 1 Apr 1943 – 31 May 1947
- Country: United States of America
- Branch: United States Marine Corps
- Type: Night fighter squadron
- Role: Air interdiction
- Garrison/HQ: Inactive
- Nickname: "Night Fighters"
- Colors: BU
- Engagements: World War II * Gilbert and Marshall Islands campaign * Mariana and Palau Islands campaign

Aircraft flown
- Fighter: F4U-2 Corsair; F6F-3N Hellcat; F7F-2N Tigercat

Marine Night Fighter Squadron 532 (VMF(N)-532) was a United States Marine Corps night fighter squadron that was commissioned during World War II. The squadron, which flew the F4U-2 Corsair, was the second night fighter squadron commissioned by the Marine Corps, the first to fly a single-seat, radar-equipped night fighter, and the only Marine squadron to fly the F4U-2 in combat. VMF(N)-532 saw extensive combat operations throughout 1944 in support of Marine Corps operations at Kwajalein Atoll and the Mariana Islands. The squadron was decommissioned on 31 May 1947, as part of the post-war draw down of the service. Since then, no other Marine Corps squadron has carried the lineage and honors of VMF(N)-532.

== History ==
=== World War II ===
==== Commissioning, training and, deployment ====
Marine Night Fighter Squadron 532 (VMF(N)-532) was commissioned on 1 April 1943, at Marine Corps Air Station Cherry Point, North Carolina by the authority of Headquarters Marine Corps Confidential Dispatch 012005 dated April 2, 1943. The first 4 officers and 51 enlisted men for the squadron were taken from VMF(N)-531. The squadron was the first Marine Corps unit to fly the F4U-2, an experimental conversion of the F4U-1 Corsair that made it into a carrier-borne night fighter, armed with five .50 in (12.7 mm) machine guns (the outboard, right gun was deleted), and fitted with Airborne Intercept (AI) radar set in a radome placed outboard on the starboard wing. When first commissioned, the squadron's complement of twelve F4U-2s and three additional spares were in the Naval Aircraft Factory in Philadelphia, Pennsylvania getting modified. These aircraft received additional modifications at Naval Air Station Quonset Point, Rhode Island, home of Project Affirm, and Marine Corps Air Station Quantico, Virginia. While waiting for aircraft modifications, squadron pilots flew SB2As and SNJ-4s.

The squadron arrived at Marine Corps Air Depot Miramar, California on 24 December 1943. VMF(N)-532 embarked planes, rolling stock, and equipment on board the USS Pocomoke (AV-9) and departed San Diego on 26 December. The squadron arrived at Pearl Harbor on New Year's Day 1944 and disembarked at Marine Corps Air Station Ewa where it was joined by 1stLt Hugh Gallarneau and 2ndLt Thomas M. Schriber, night fighter directors from Air Warning Squadron 1. These two controllers had worked with the squadron during training at MCAS Cherry Point and were tasked to accompany -532 as it deployed forward. The unit departed Pearl Harbor on 7 January 1944, on board the USS White Plains (CVE-66) and sailed via Funafuti Atoll before finally arriving at Tarawa on 13 January 1944.

==== Operations in the Central Pacific ====
VMF(N)-532 was only based at Mullinix Field on Ella Island for a short time. While there, the squadron was responsible for flying nighttime combat air patrols (CAP) in defense of Tarawa Atoll. They were supported by an SCR-527 radar operated by the Navy's Argus Unit 17. During that time period the radar was in such a poor state of repair that it made nighttime intercepts nearly impossible.

On 12 February 1944, utilizing window to fool radars belonging to the 15th Defense Battalion, Japanese seaplanes from Ponape bombed Roi-Namur causing a massive explosion in one of the island's ammo dumps in the process. It turned out to be the most destructive Japanese air raid against the United States since the attacks on Pearl Harbor. 26 Marines were killed, 130 wounded and 80% of the islands supplies and 20% of the construction equipment were destroyed. Because of this, on 15 February, a six plane section from VMF(N)-532 was immediately moved to Roi-Namur to begin providing night CAP over Roi-Namur, Kwajalein, Engebi, and Eniwetok. On 17 February the squadron's fighter controllers and a skeleton ground crew flew to Roi on two R4Ds. The squadron's ground echelon embarked upon the USS Bangust, USS Fleming (DE-32), and USS Anacapa (AG-49) and arrived at Roi on 21 February. Seven additional planes from the squadron arrived on 23 February. On 27 February, eight planes from the squadron were sent to Engebi to assist with night operations in that portion of the atoll.

On 14 April 1944, night fighters from VMF(N)-532 successfully intercepted a flight of 12 Japanese bombers that had departed Ponape and were inbound to bomb Engebi. The initial bogey was spotted at 0013 at 83 miles out bearing 235 degrees. Seven more planes appeared shortly thereafter and an additional four planes from the squadron were launched to intercept. Working with the Ground-controlled intercept controllers from Air Warning Squadron 1, squadron pilots shot down two Mitsubishi G4M bombers, possibly destroyed another and more importantly caused all of the remaining bombers to drop their ordnance in the waters surrounding the island with no loss of personnel or material. Capt Howard W. Bollman and 1stLt Edward A. Sovik were each awarded the Distinguished Flying Cross for their actions that evening.

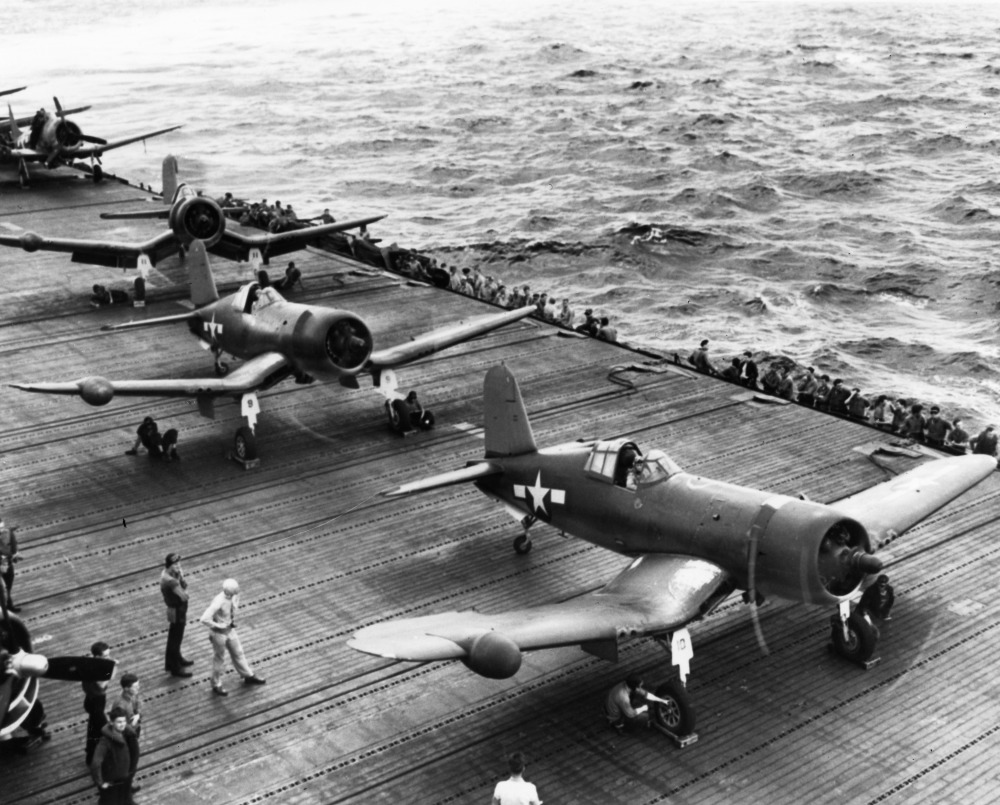
Vought F4U-2s from VMF(N)-532 preparing to take off from the USS Windham Bay.

In May 1944, Vice Admiral Marc Mitscher visited the squadron and was so impressed that he took possession of two of the squadron's F4U-2Ns for inspection. He replaced the aircraft with two F4U Corsair day fighters that then had to be modified into night fighters. On 11 June 1944, VMF(N)-532 was relieved by VMF(N)-533 on Engebi and the detachment returned to Roi-Namur. With the squadron reassembled on Roi Namur, it began flying nighttime raids against the Japanese seaplane base on Wotje Atoll starting on 30 June.

On 5 July 1944, the squadron received verbal orders to prepare for movement and soon embarked upon the USS Windham Bay (CVE-92) sailing for the Mariana Islands. -532 arrived on Saipan, which had recently been secured. Originally based at Aslito Airfield, -532 began flying nighttime CAP from dusk to dawn and conducted air interdiction missions against Rota Island. The squadron later moved to a smaller fighter airstrip in the northeast part of Saipan. Because there were still a large number of Japanese stragglers in the area, Marines from the squadron regularly patrolled the nearby mountains. There were a number of engagements with Japanese troops during this time frame. On 12 September, VMF(N)-542 received orders to return to the United States. Ten days later squadron pilots flew eleven F4U-2s to Guam to be transferred to other units. VMF(N)-532 departed Saipan in October 1944.

==== Return to the United States and reorganization ====
Departing from Guam in early October 1944, the squadron arrived back at MCAD Miramar on 25 October 1944. On 2 December 1944, the squadron relocated to Marine Corps Air Station Eagle Mountain Lake, Texas joining Marine Aircraft Group 53. During this time the squadron converted to flying the Grumman F6F-3N Hellcat and quickly thereafter the Grumman F7F Tigercat. The squadron remained at Eagle Mountain Lake for the duration of the war. VMF(N)-531 returned to MCS Cherry Point with the rest of Marine Aircraft Group 53 in February 1946. VMF(N)-532 fell victim to the dramatic cuts to Marine Aviation that occurred after the war and was decommissioned on 31 May 1947.

== Aircraft accidents ==
- 27 August 1943 - 1stLt Archie W. McPhee from Montesano, Washington was killed when his SNJ-4 crashed near New Bern, North Carolina during a nighttime familiarization flight.
- 29 September 1943 - BuNo 430929 - 2ndLt Connor N. Gilfillan crashed his F4U-2 while returning to MCAS Cherry Point, NC while returning from a daytime training flight.
- 14 April 1944 - 1stLt Joel E. Bonner Jr from Dallas, TX was forced to parachute from his F4U-2 when its windshield was covered in engine oil from a damaged Japanese bomber.
- 14 April 1944 - BuNo 440414 - 1stLt Donald Spatz from West Reading, PA was flying an F4U-2 when he was improperly vectored by a Navy ARGUS controller and became lost at sea. His remains were never recovered.
- 2 September 1944 - BuNo 440902 - 1stLt Richard Pfizenmaier's F4U-2 crashed during takeoff. Plane was destroyed and pilot was seriously injured.

== Notable former members ==
- Frank C. Lang
- Robert Baird

== See also ==
- United States Marine Corps Aviation
- List of United States Marine Corps aircraft squadrons
- List of decommissioned United States Marine Corps aircraft squadrons
