= 15th Antiaircraft Artillery Battalion =

- Active: 1 Oct 1942 – 25 Nov 1944
- Country: United States of America
- Branch: United States Marine Corps
- Type: Air Defense/Coastal Defense
- Size: ~1100 men
- Nickname: First:Fifteenh
- Engagements: World War II: Battle of Roi-Namur

Commanders
- Current commander: N/A
- Notable commanders: Francis B. Loomis Jr.

The 15th Antiaircraft Artillery Battalion (15th AAA Bn) was an antiaircraft unit in the United States Marine Corps that served during World War II. The battalion was originally formed in 1942 as the 1st Airdrome Battalion. Its original mission was to provide air defense for advanced naval bases. During the war the battalion took part in combat operations in the Marshall. The battalion was one of the first defense battalions to be decommissioned on November 25, 1944.

== History ==
=== Organization ===
1st Airdrome Battalion Table of Organization:

- Headquarters and Service Battery
  - Light tank platoon
- 90mm Gun Group
  - 3 x 90mm Gun batteries
- Searchlight Batteries
  - 2 x batteries each w/ six lights
- Special Weapons Group
  - 40mm Battery (w/ 12 guns)
  - 2 x machine gun platoons
    - 12 x .50cal water-cooled antiaircraft guns
    - 12 x .30cal water-cooled antiaircraft guns

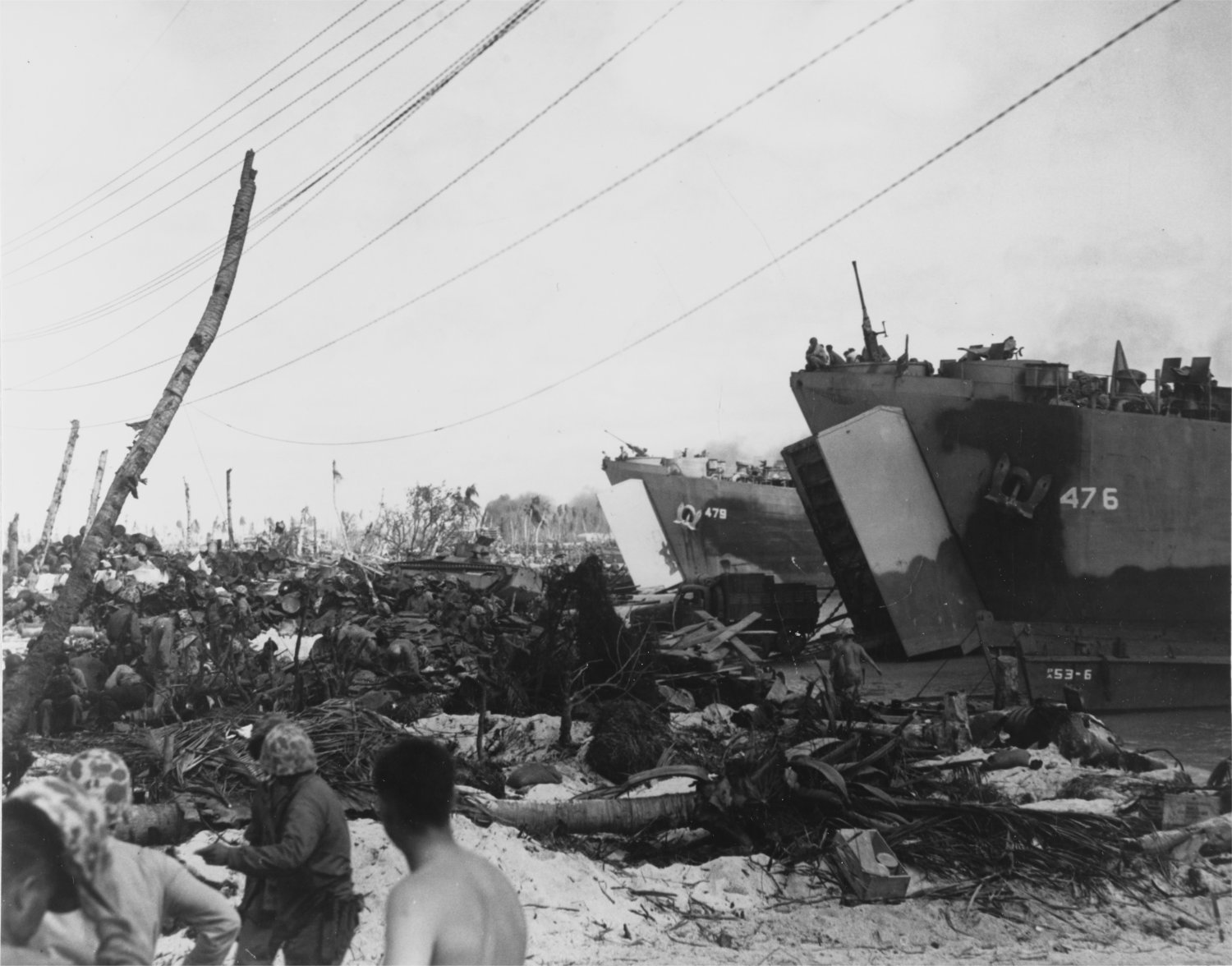
LSTs 476 & 479 unloading 15th Defense Battalion equipment on Roi-Namur in February 1944.

The 1st Airdrome Battalion was commissioned on October 1, 1942 at Marine Corps Air Station New River, North Carolina. It was one of two airdrome battalions formed by the Marine Corps specifically to defend airfields in the China Burma India Theater. Those airfields were overrun by the Japanese before the battalions deployed so the Marine Corps quickly changed their tasking to missions in the Pacific Theater. The battalion arrived at Pearl Harbor on September 18, 1943 and based out of Camp Catlin and Camp Beaumont near Nānākuli. From October 1943 through January 1944 the battalion trained on Oahu. During this period the battalion was re-designated as the 15th Defense Battalion on October 10, 1943 {Auth Letter from Commanding General MarFor, Serial No. 43108, dated 20Oct43} No other Marine Corps unit has carried the battalion's lineage and honors since it was decommissioned.

=== Roi-Namur ===
On January 15, 1944 the battalion began loading LSTs-476, 477, and 479. It was assigned as part of the Northern Landing Force for the upcoming attack on Kwajalein Atoll and departed on January 22. The 15th came ashore on Roi-Namur on February 2, 1944. The battalions antiaircraft assets were in place prior to the island being secured. Many of the units guns were emplaced in craters leftover from the American shelling and bombing of the airfield. Marines from the 15th Defense Battalion and the Seacoast Artillery Group also formed an ad hoc "Burial Unit" in order to bury the scores of enemy dead on the small island. As the garrison force for Roi-Namur, the battalions motor transport assets were critical to clean up efforts and new construction projects. The battalion's antiaircraft guns went into action against the first Japanese air raid against Roi-Namur on February 12, 1944. Through the creative use of window, which fooled the 15th's radars, Japanese seaplanes from Ponape got through unscathed and bombed the island setting off one of the ammo dumps in the process. It turned out to be the most destructive Japanese air raid against the United States since the attacks on Pearl Harbor. 26 Marines were killed, 130 wounded and 80% of the islands supplies and 20% of the construction equipment were destroyed. During the seizure of Roi-Namur the 15th Defense Battalion had five Marines killed in action and forty wounded in action.

=== Return to Hawaii and decommissioning ===
On April 19, 1944 the battalion was re-designated as the 15th Antiaircraft Battalion. Just under a month later, on May 7, their designator was changed for the final time to the 15th Antiaircraft Artillery Battalion. On October 18 the 52nd Defense Battalion arrived at Roi-Namur to replace the 15th. The relief in place was complete by October 22. The battalion loaded onto the USS Winged Arrow (AP-170) and departed Roi-namur bound for Hawaii. It arrived in Hawaii on November 8, 1944. The 15th Antiaircraft Artillery Battalion was decommissioned just over two weeks later on November 25, 1944.

== Unit awards ==
A unit citation or commendation is an award bestowed upon an organization for the action cited. Members of the unit who participated in said actions are allowed to wear on their uniforms the awarded unit citation. The 15th Antiaircraft Artillery Battalion has been presented with the following awards:

Streamer	Award	Year(s)	Additional Info
	Asiatic-Pacific Campaign Streamer	1944	Kwajalein
	World War II Victory Streamer	1941–1945	Pacific War

== See also ==
- Marine Defense Battalions
- List of United States Marine Corps aviation support units
