= 3d Antiaircraft Artillery Battalion (Composite) =

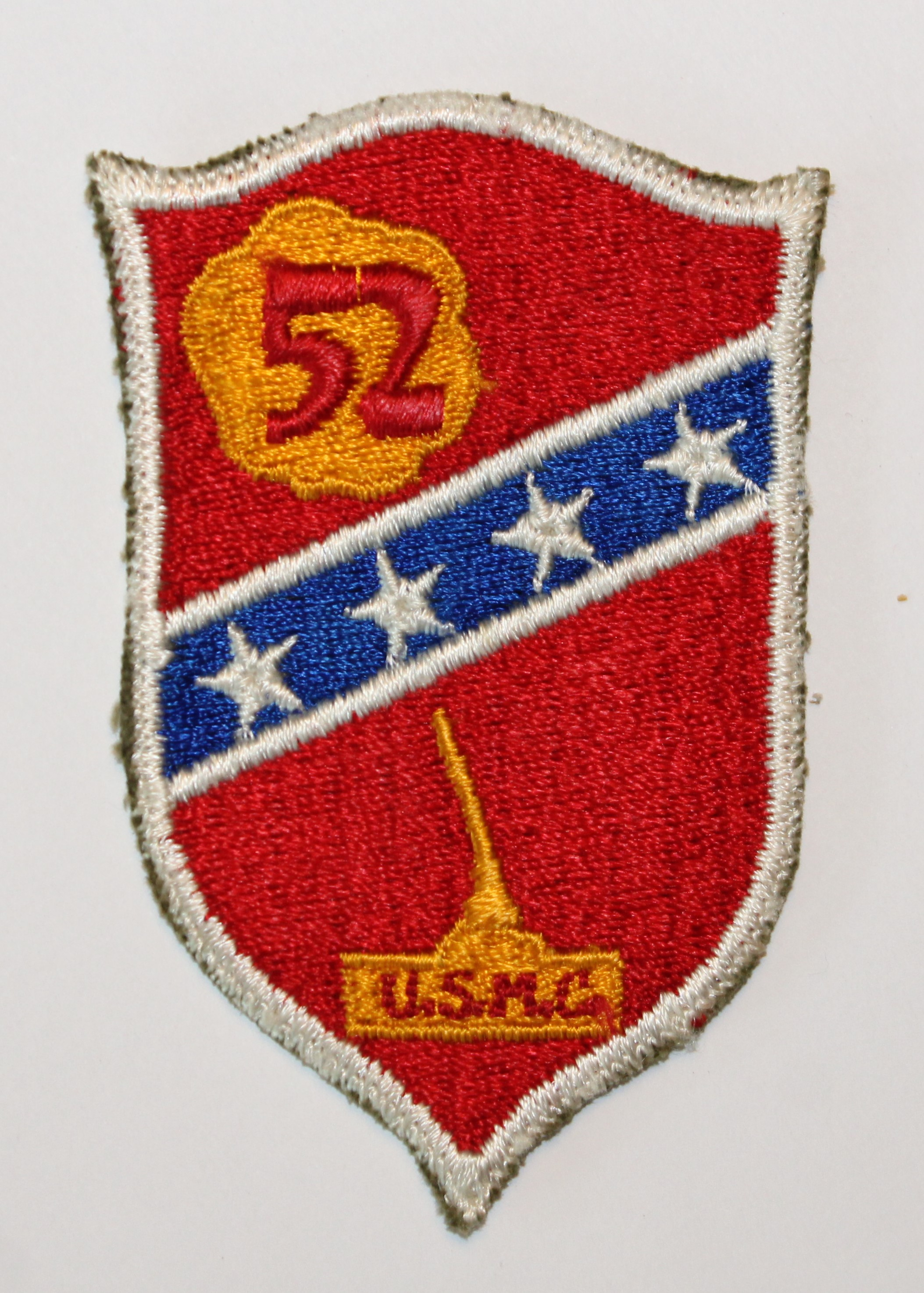
- Insignia for the 52d Defense Battalion
- Active: 15 Dec 1943 – 15 May 1947
- Country: United States of America
- Branch: United States Marine Corps
- Type: Air Defense/Coastal Defense
- Size: ~1100 men
- Engagements: World War II

Commanders
- Current commander: N/A

The 3d Antiaircraft Artillery Battalion (Composite) (3d AAA Bn (Composite)) was an antiaircraft unit in the United States Marine Corps that served during World War II. The battalion was originally formed in 1943 as the 52d Defense Battalion, one of the first African American units in the Marine Corps. Its original mission was to provide air and coastal defense for advanced naval bases. During the war the battalion served as garrison forces on Roi-Namur, Majuro, and Guam. The battalion returned to Marine Corps Base Camp Lejeune, North Carolina after the war. It was the last of the defense battalions before it was re-designated as the 3d Antiaircraft Artillery Battalion in May 1946. The battalion was decommissioned on May 15, 1947.

== History ==
=== Organization ===
The 52d Defense Battalion was commissioned on December 15, 1943 at the Montford Point Camp near Marine Corps Base Camp Lejeune, North Carolina. It was the last defense battalion commissioned in the Marine Corps. The first 400 men in the battalion came from the 51st Defense Battalion that had been training at Montford Point since August 1942. The technical and leadership experience these men brought with them meant that the 52d did not experience as many of the early growing pains that the 51st did. In February 1944 the battalion moved to the old Civilian Conservation Corps barracks at Camp Knox which was adjacent to Montford Point. While there, they also incorporated the men of the recently decommissioned 7th Separate Pack Howitzer Battery which provided another boost of experienced personnel.

During the first half of 1944 the battalion honed its craft at Onslow Beach. Along with all of the other defense battalions in the Marine Corps, the 52d's coastal artillery was removed in order to form additional heavy artillery units for the Fleet Marine Force. The 52d Defense Battalion, along with the 6th and 51st were the only units to retain the moniker of Defense Battalion. All of the others were re-designated Antiaircraft Artillery Battalions.

On August 19, 1944 the battalion departed North Carolina for the West Coast. Prior to departure the battalion was reorganized into two similarly organized detachments. It arrived at Marine Corps Base Camp Pendleton, California on August 24, 1944.

=== Majuro & Roi-Namur ===
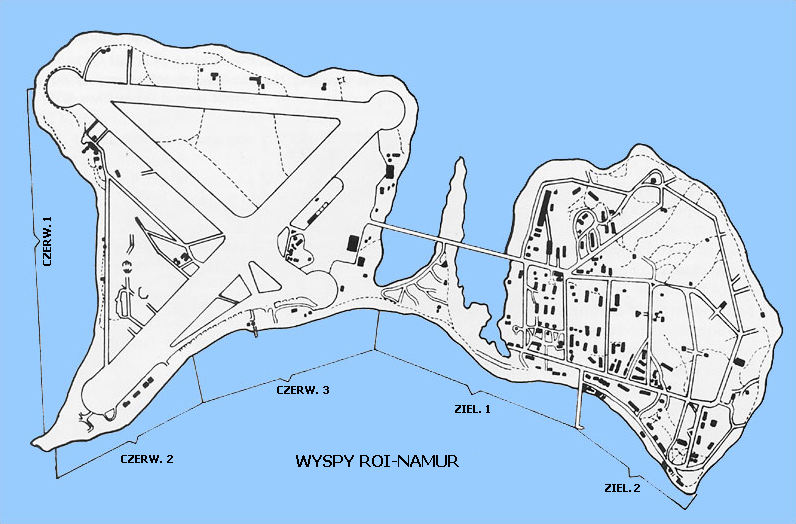
Map of Roi-Namur

On September 21 the battalion departed the United States embarked upon the USS Winged Arrow (AP-170). Once ashore, the battalion remained divided defending two different atolls from October 1944 through May 1945.

One detachment from the battalion arrived at Majuro Airfield, Majuro Atoll on October 17, 1944. They relieved Marines of the 1st Antiaircraft Artillery Battalion that had been stationed their since the island was secured in February 1944. Along with its mission of protecting Marine Aircraft Group 13's airfield, Marines from the 52d were also tasked with conducting patrols through the nearby islands to search for Japanese activity. The detachment remained at Majuro until March 9, 1945 when it departed on board the USS De Grasse (AK-223).

The other half of the battalion sailed for Roi-Namur, Kwajalein Atoll where it disembarked on October 22 and relieved the 15th Antiaircraft Artillery Battalion protecting Marine Aircraft Group 31's airfield. It remained on Roi-Namur until April 28, 1945 when it departed on board the SS George W. Julian.

=== Guam ===
The Majuro detachment arrived at Guam on March 29 and immediately established camp near the village of Barrigada. The Roi-Namur detachment arrived on May 4, 1945. With the battalion reunited on Guam when it took part in garrison duty relieving the 14th Defense Battalion. While on Guam they aggressively patrolled for Japanese stragglers and participated in construction duty. In the summer of 1945, the battalion began preparing for deployment to Okinawa however with the mitigation of the kamikaze threat their orders were changed and they remained on Guam. Knowing they were not deploying to Okinawa had a very deleterious effect on the unit's morale as they came to view themselves as nothing more than an available pool of men for working parties. Gilbert Johnson successfully lobbied his commanding officer to resume aggressive patrolling in order to restore unit morale. Garrison duty on Guam was also difficult because of severe racial discrimination at the hands of white Sailors and Marines.

=== After the War ===
On August 19, 1945, four days after the Japanese surrender, the battalion began transitioning to being a support unit. This became official on September 30 when it was placed under the command of the 5th Service Depot. A detachment from the battalion relieved elements of the 51st Defense Battalion on Eniwetok from October 1945 until January 29, 1945 when it returned on the USS Hyde (APA-173). On February 28, the battalion's Heavy Antiaircraft Group was permanently detached to form the Heavy Antiaircraft Group (Provisional), Saipan. The remainder of the battalion departed Guam on May 13, 1946 on the USS Wakefield (AP-21) sailing for San Diego. Arriving on May 26, it discharged some Marines at Marine Corps Base Camp Pendleton and boarded trains for the east coast. The battalion arrived back at MCB Camp Lejeune April 4, 1946 and on May 15, 1946 the battalion was re-designated as the 3d Antiaircraft Artillery Battalion (Composite). The 3d AAA Battalion was not long for the Marine Corps as it was officially decommissioned on May 15, 1947.

== Notable former members ==
- Gilbert "Hashmark" Johnson

== Unit awards ==
A unit citation or commendation is an award bestowed upon an organization for the action cited. Members of the unit who participated in said actions are allowed to wear on their uniforms the awarded unit citation. The 3d Antiaircraft Artillery Battalion (Composite) has been presented with the following awards:

Streamer	Award	Year(s)	Additional Info
	World War II Victory Streamer	1941–1945	Pacific War

== See also ==
- Marine Defense Battalions
- List of United States Marine Corps aviation support units
