= Marion M. Magruder =

Marion M. "Black Mac" Magruder
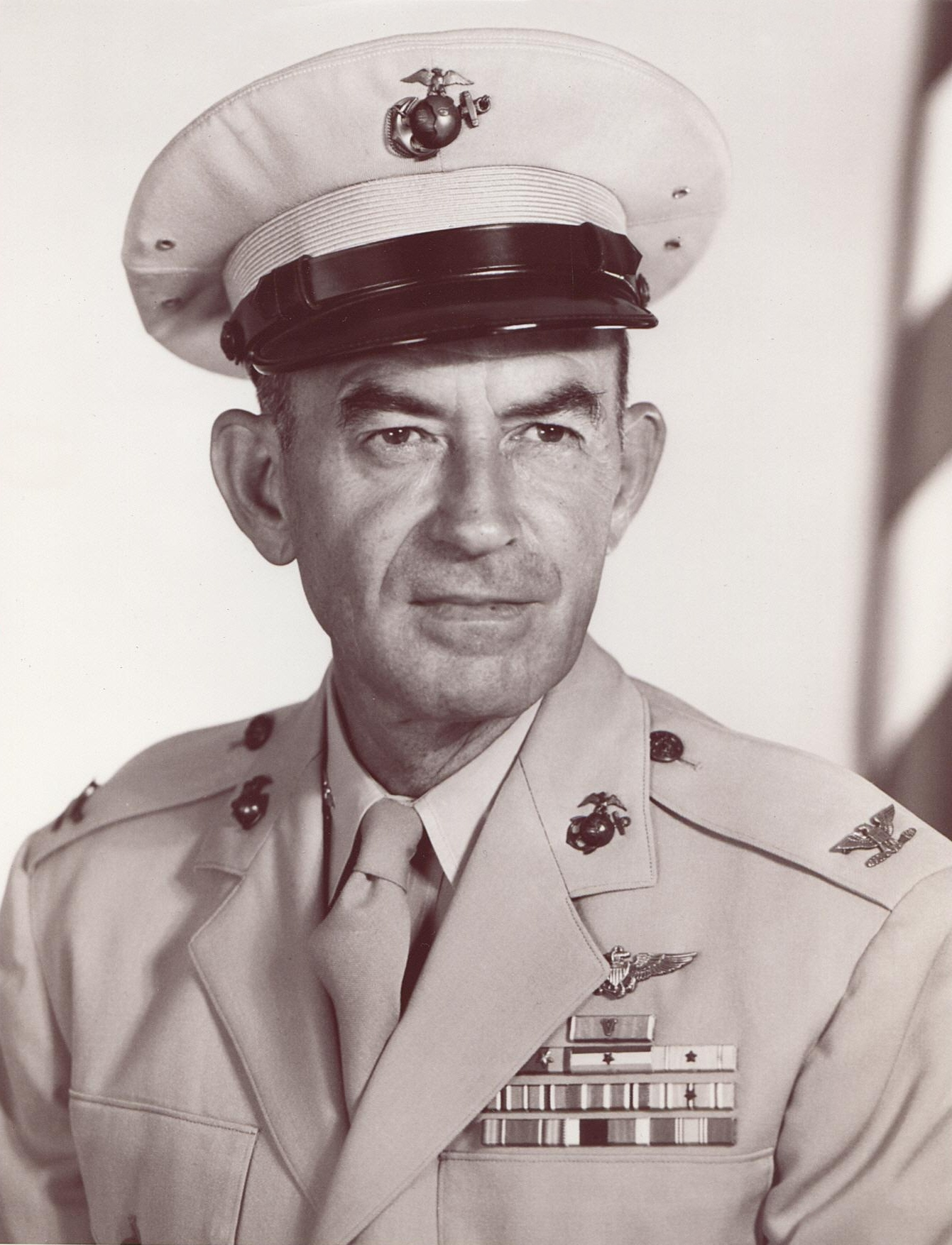
- Born: June 27, 1911; Lexington, Kentucky, U.S.
- Died: June 27, 1997 (aged 86); Paradise Valley, Arizona, U.S.
- Military career
- Allegiance: United States
- Branch: United States Marine Corps
- Service years: 1936–1961
- Rank: Colonel
- Nickname: Black Mac
- Commands: VMF(N)-533; Marine Aircraft Group 53; Marine Aircraft Group 31; Marine Aircraft Group 11; Marine Corps Air Station Kaneohe Bay
- Conflicts: World War II: Battle of Europe; Battle of the Marshall Islands; Battle of Okinawa
- Awards: Legion of Merit; Air Medal with Gold Stars in lieu of second and third awards Presidential Unit Citation Ribbon with One Bronze Star; American Defense Service Medal with Base Clasp; European-African-Middle Eastern Campaign Medal with One Bronze Star; American Campaign Medal; World War II Victory Medal; National Defense Service Medal

Marion Milton Magruder (June 27, 1911 – June 27, 1997) was an officer in the United States Marine Corps, and a pioneer in Radar Intercept Night Fighting. He was the first commanding officer of Marine aircraft squadron VMF(N)-533, then known as "Black Mac's Killers" , and led that squadron during the Battle of the Marshall Islands and Battle of Okinawa in World War II.

== Biography ==
=== Early years and beginning of military career ===
Magruder was born to William Marion Magruder and Augusta Tong Magruder of 456 Rose Lane, Lexington, Kentucky. He was the third of four children; his siblings were Aliene, Eldon and Jane Magruder. He graduated with Honors from the University of Kentucky on May 22, 1936, with a B.A. in psychology. He was the undefeated Golden Gloves Welter Weight Boxing Champion of the University of Kentucky, a member of the Sword and Scabbard Military Fraternity and a member of Alpha Tau Omega fraternity. The governor of Kentucky commissioned him a Kentucky colonel, and the mayor of Lexington presented him with the "Key to the City of Lexington".

After graduating from the Reserve Officers' Training Corps program at the University of Kentucky, Magruder accepted an officer's commission in the United States Marine Corps on July 1, 1936, becoming a second lieutenant. On July 5, 1938, Magruder reported for Flight School at Naval Air Station Pensacola, Florida. After graduating as Naval Aviator #6008, he was promoted to first lieutenant. Magruder was assigned to squadron VMF-1 at Marine Corps Air Station Quantico, Virginia. He was promoted to captain in 1940. In the spring of 1941 he became assistant material officer, Division of Aviation, Headquarters Marine Corps, Washington, D.C. In August 1942 Magruder was promoted to major.

=== World War II ===
On February 6, 1943, Major Magruder was deployed to England for a 3-month stint to learn as much as possible about Radar Intercept Night Fighting from the Royal Air Force (RAF). The United States Navy critically needed to establish effective night fighting capabilities for the Pacific Campaign. Magruder was assigned to develop the U.S. Naval Radar Intercept Doctrine that entailed extensive modification of the British system into an almost totally different operational syllabus. Admiral John S. McCain Sr., then Director Aircraft Pacific, required a single-pilot, single-engine aircraft that was capable of operating from a carrier while the British utilized a two-seat fighter that employed an onboard radar operator. Magruder reconfigured the system to include a remote ground control intercept (GCI) radar operator to coordinate exclusively with his designated pilot, to give him a vector close enough to the target for the pilot's own shorter-range radar to locate the target. In June 1943 Magruder was assigned as Night Fighter Training Officer at the newly formed Marine Aircraft Group 53 (MAG-53) at Marine Corps Air Station Cherry Point, North Carolina.

On October 1, 1943, Magruder became the commanding officer of the newly formed VMF(N)-533, which eventually took the nickname "Black Mac's Killers". VMF(N)-533 was the first Marine Corps squadron to receive the F6F-3(N) Hellcat night fighter. In November 1943 Magruder was promoted to lieutenant colonel.

After a difficult radar intercept training program, the squadron deployed to Enewetak Atoll on May 6, 1944, to take over the night defense of the area. On July 6, 1944, Magruder's squadron also set up a rotating contingent on Roi Island and Kwajalein Atoll for their night defense. On November 30, 1944, "Black Mac's Killers" moved its base of operations from Enewetak to Engebi.

On May 7, 1945, VMF(N)-533, with three days notice, was ordered to deploy to Yontan Airfield on Okinawa to shore up sagging night defenses during the Battle of Okinawa. With just a skeleton crew of fifteen pilots flying their fifteen Hellcats, and an extra thirteen officers (8 extra pilots, a flight surgeon, flight director and three key department heads), along with 57 enlisted men flying in 5 transport aircraft provided squadron VMR-252 with whatever spare parts and gear that could be squeezed on board; they departed on the longest over-water flight of single-engine fighters in World War II. The remainder of the squadron personnel and equipment followed by sea on LSTs and would not link up again with this skeleton crew for more than a month.

Arriving on May 14, 1945, at Yontan Field, the squadron was operational in 36 hours. Magruder's squadron scored its first night intercepts on May 18, 1945 when two of his pilots conducted five radar assisted night kils. On June 15, 1945, the squadron moved operations from Yontan Air Field to Charlie Air Strip, Ie Shima where they joined the rest of the squadron personnel and served out the remainder of the war. In spite of the fact that VMF(N)-533 arrived 40 days after the campaign for Okinawa began, with terrible weather throughout, "Black Mac's Killers" registered 35 enemy aircraft victories and 1 probable all Radar Intercepts, which was almost as many aircraft destroyed as all three other night fighter squadrons on Okinawa, combined. VMF(N)-533 was the top scoring Night Fighter Squadron of the Pacific Theater in World War II. VMF(N)-533 had the best safety record and the highest combat ready rate for any operational squadron in the Pacific. In 15 months of overseas deployments, the 'Killers' logged over 11,000 flight hours. For this action, the squadron were awarded the Presidential Unit Citation. On July 8, 1945, Lieutenant Colonel Magruder transferred command of VMF(N)-533 to his executive officer and returned to the United States for a War Bond Tour.

Shortly after V-J Day, September 1945, Magruder became the commanding officer of Marine Aircraft Group 53 (a fully integrated Night Fighter Command) at Marine Corps Air Station Eagle Mountain Lake, Texas. The group consisted of seven tactical squadrons, one service and support squadron, one headquarters squadron, one ground control radar squadron and one ground control approach radar unit. This totalled nearly 2400 officers and men with 146 aircraft. At the time this was the largest aircraft group in Marine Aviation. In February 1946, MAG-53 moved operations back to MCAS Cherry Point. In August 1946 Magruder assumed command of Marine Aircraft Group 31.

=== Education and joint billets ===
From July 1947 to July 1948, Lieutenant Colonel Magruder attended and graduated from the Air War College, Maxwell Air Force Base, Alabama. He co-wrote the thesis "The Impact and Role of Missiles In a War During the Foreseeable Future 5–10 Years." From August 1948 to May 1950, Magruder was assigned as instructor to Senior Course, Aviation Section Marine Corps Schools, Marine Corps Base Quantico, Virginia.

In June 1950, Magruder was assigned to the chief of staff of Commander-in-Chief Europe, Heidelberg, Germany. Magruder was the only Marine officer assigned to this theater command. For this assignment Admiral Forrest Sherman, Chief of Naval Operations, after interviewing numerous senior Marine officers, personally selected Magruder for this special duty. Magruder became assistant head of the Plans Branch of the Operations, Plans, Organization and Training Division of the European Unified Combatant Command. Responsibilities included: Preparation and presentation of many U.S. "Eyes Only" plans to be placed into operation in the event of emergency and/or war, including "Operation Blast Proof". As a member of the senior U.S. Command in Europe, Magruder was responsible for coordinating complete plans with all other major commands in Europe as well as many high level civil authorities in Germany, France and England. On January 1, 1951, Magruder was promoted to colonel.

In July 1952, Colonel Magruder was assigned as Assistant Head of Plans and Operations Branch, Division of Aviation, Headquarters, Marine Corps. Responsibilities required preparation and presentation of many plans and staff studies for the training and operations of all Marine Corps Aviation, and determining operational requirements for aircraft and new aircraft characteristics in presentations to the Commandant of the Marine Corps, Chief of the Bureau of Aeronautics and Chief of Naval Operations. Magruder participated in the planning, preparation and coordination of the Aviation portion of the Marine Corps overall budgets.

From July 1954 to June 1955, Magruder attended and graduated from the National War College. His thesis, "Nuclear Weapons – An Instrument of National Policy" was classified and, because of its strategic implications, was not released for publication.

=== Back to the Fleet ===
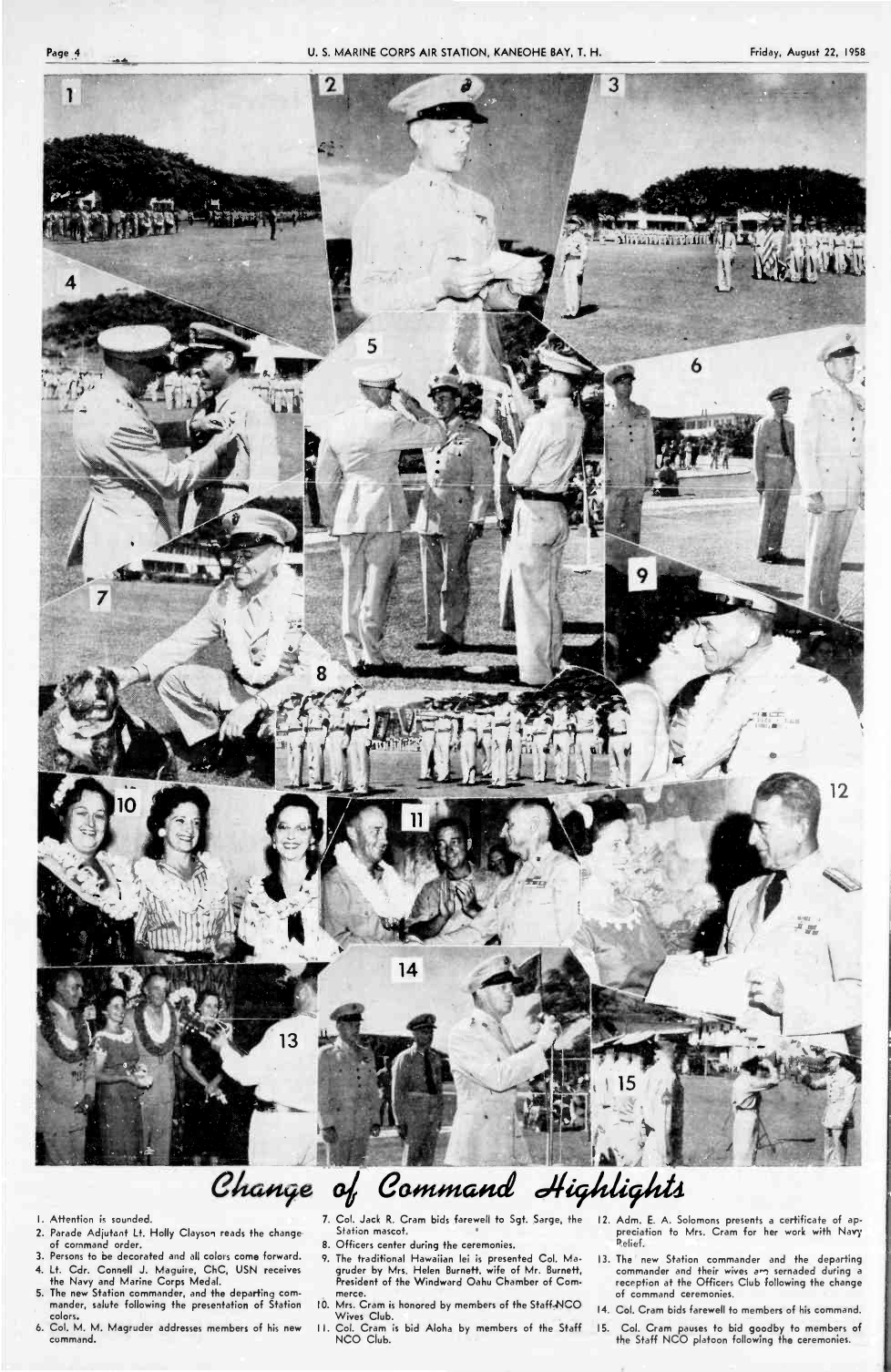
Col. M. M. Magruder assumes command of the Marine Corps Air Station Kaneohe Bay, Hawaii

From July 1955 through June 1956, Colonel Magruder commanded Marine Aircraft Group 11 at Naval Air Station Atsugi, Japan. This was the largest Marine Aircraft Group in the Far East and consisted of five fighter attack squadrons, one GCI radar station, one air base squadron for the maintenance and operation of group facilities and heavy group-level aircraft maintenance, along with one headquarters squadron. The group consisted of 1,860 officers and men and 126 aircraft. MAG-11 conducted continuous round-the-clock air operations providing for the airborne defense of Japan, and maintained readiness for immediate movement of all aircraft, to include all classes of materiel and supplies to sustain the group for 90 days of combat to any area of the Far East. Duties included maintaining the on-site storing and employing of tactical nuclear weapons and conventional weapons in coordination with the commanding general, U.S. Air Forces, Japan. Magruder's MAG-11 also provided secure basing facilities for the Central Intelligence Agency's U-2 program.

From August 1956 to June 1958, he was assigned as assistant chief of staff G-4 (logistics), Fleet Marine Force, Pacific located at Camp H. M. Smith, Hawaii. This encompassed the largest single command in the Marine Corps – 2 Marine Divisions, 1 brigade, and 2 aircraft wings consisting of a total of 65,000 officers and men and 800 aircraft, with units located on the West Coast, Hawaii, Japan and Okinawa. Soon thereafter Magruder became head of the General Staff Section, G-4. Magruder coordinated and supervised the continuous flow of all classes of material for the training and operations of all elements of the command.

His next assignment was from June 1958 through June 1960, as commanding officer of Marine Corps Air Station Kaneohe Bay, Hawaii. The Air Station encompassed the greater part of the Kaneohe Peninsula—3,000 acres (12 km^{2}) of industrial and barracks buildings to include 5 large aircraft hangars, extensive bomb and ordnance storage, including tactical nuclear weapons and air-sea rescue facilities.

On June 12, 1960, Magruder prepared for and was host of President Eisenhower and his staff of 62 VIPs. (The President originally planned a three-day visit to MCAS Kaneohe Bay; however it was extended to five days when riots in Japan forced the cancellation of that State visit.)

In August 1960, Magruder was assigned as director, 12th Marine Corps Reserve, Recruitment District headquartered in San Francisco, California. This posting included responsibility for training, operational readiness, logistical support, preparation and justification of budgets and operation of district offices and branch offices, 42 reserve units of company and battalion size, 5 recruiting stations and 81 substations located throughout the district encompassing 9 Western States—400 officers and 10,000 men. This command ranked 6th out of 7 districts when Magruder assumed command. Within 8 months this district placed first among all U.S. Districts in recruiting and retention of Marine Corps personnel and force readiness.

On August 31, 1961, Colonel Magruder retired from active duty after 26 years of service in the U.S. Marine Corps.

== Later life ==
On January 1, 1962, Magruder began his civilian career, becoming the assistant to the president of Stanley Aviation in Aurora, Colorado. On August 1, 1963, Magruder became executive vice president of Peoples Bank and Trust in Aurora, and on April 29, 1964, he became president of his own corporation, The M's Inc., with the purchase of his first McDonald's franchise in Grand Junction, Colorado. Within 15 years, Magruder placed all five of his sons in McDonald's franchises in Colorado, Arizona and California.

Magruder continued to be involved in national affairs with communications and associations with military and civil authorities on the highest levels. Magruder served on a number of 'national policy boards' and organizations, and was a lifelong Rotarian. Magruder died on his 86th birthday, June 27, 1997 in Paradise Valley, Arizona.

== Personal life ==
On July 2, 1938, Magruder married Martha Ann Kelly of Lexington, Kentucky, at St. Paul's Catholic Church of Lexington. They had five children:

- Marion Milton Magruder Jr (born April 29, 1940)
- Michael David Magruder (born February 3, 1942)
- Mark Allan Magruder (born June 26, 1946)
- Marshall Kelly Magruder (born January 8, 1950)
- Merritt Skye Magruder (born June 5, 1960)

== Recognition ==
On November 11, 2017, Colonel Marion M. "Black Mac" Magruder, USMC, was inducted into the Kentucky Aviation Hall of Fame. His son, Mark A. Magruder, Phoenix, Arizona, gave the induction speech.

== See also ==
- United States Marine Corps Aviation
