= VMF(N)-534 =

Marine Night Fighter Squadron 534
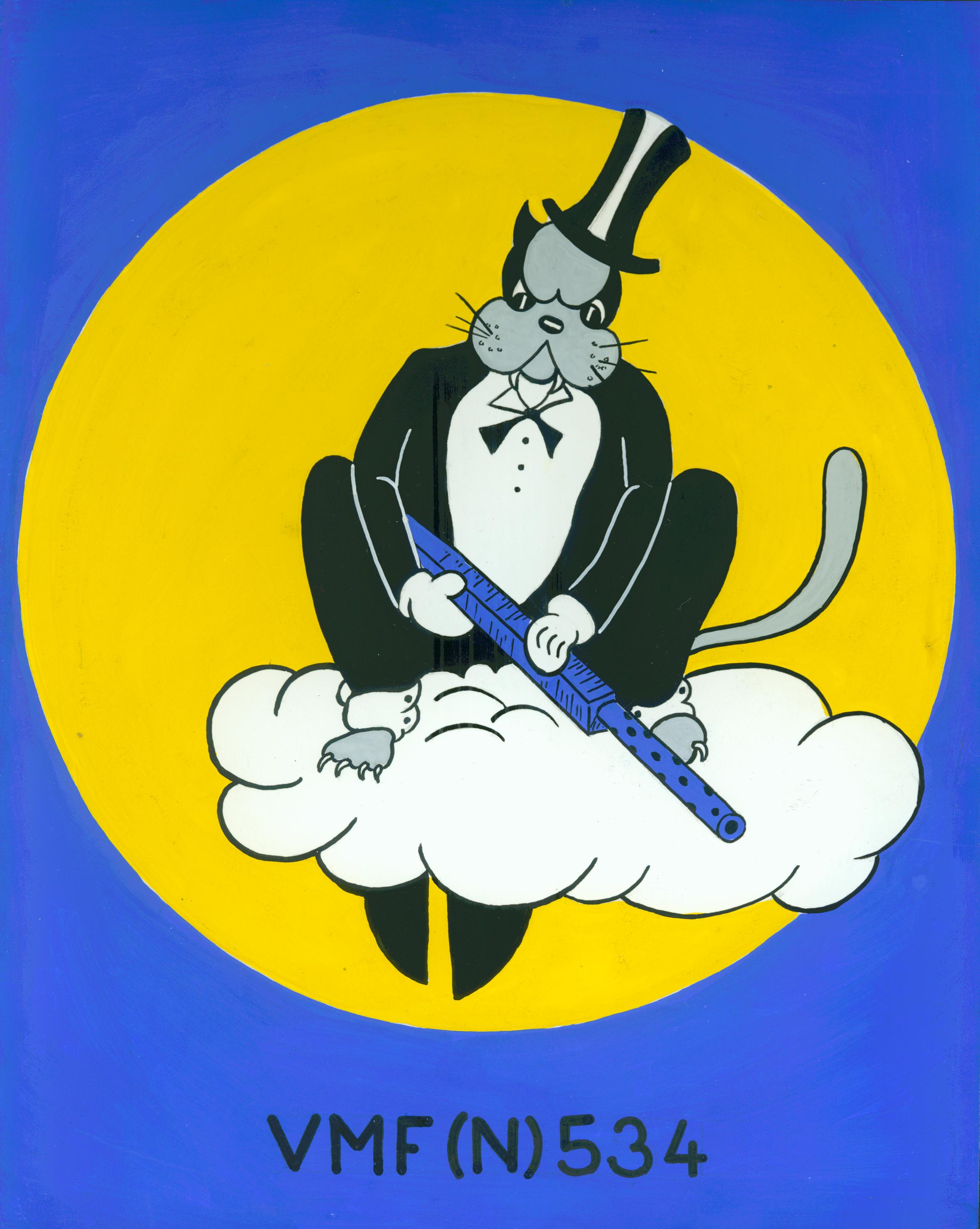
- VMF(N)-534 Insignia
- Active: 1 Oct 1943 – 31 May 1947
- Country: United States of America
- Branch: United States Marine Corps
- Type: Night fighter squadron
- Role: Air interdiction
- Garrison/HQ: Inactive
- Colors: WF (WWII); BV (1946-47)
- Engagements: World War II

Aircraft flown
- Fighter: F6F-3N Hellcat; F7F-2N Tigercat

Marine Night Fighter Squadron 534 (VMF(N)-534) was a United States Marine Corps night fighter squadron that was commissioned during World War II. It was the fourth night fighter squadron commissioned in the service and participated in limited combat operations throughout 1944 and 1945 during Marine Corps operations over Kwajalein Atoll and the Mariana Islands. The squadron was decommissioned on 31 May 1947, as part of the post-war draw down of the service. Since then, no other Marine Corps squadron has carried the lineage and honors of VMF(N)-534.

== History ==
=== Commissioning, training and, deployment ===
VMF(N)-534 was commissioned on 1 October 1943, at Marine Corps Air Station Cherry Point, North Carolina on the authority of Marine Corps Dispatch 292038, dated 23 September 1943. The squadron received its first F6F-3N night fighter on 1 December 1943, and commenced training in eastern North Carolina until departing for the west coast on 1 April 1944. Squadron member arrived at Marine Corps Air Depot Miramar between 4–7 April and later departed Naval Air Station North Island, San Diego on 19 April 1944, on board the USS Breton (CVE-23).

=== Operations in the Central Pacific ===
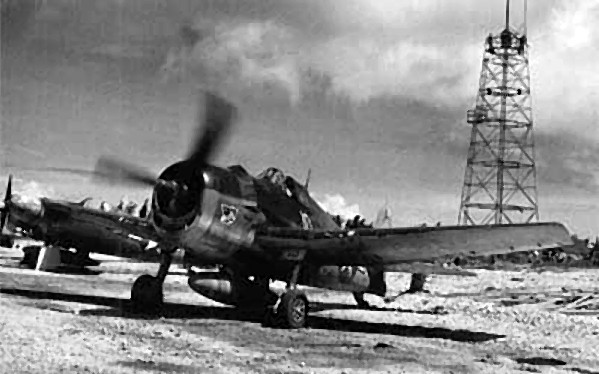
An F6F-5N from VMF(N)-534 preparing to taxi.

The squadron arrived at Naval Advance Base Espiritu Santo on 4 May 1944, and flew into Luganville Airfield the next day joining Marine Aircraft Group 21. It remained there for nearly a month before the flight echelon departed on 2 June 1944, on the USS Santee (CVE-29). The squadron's ground personnel were split between the USS Cetus (AK-77), SS Typhoon, and the SS Young. After 65 days at sea, VMF(N)-534's, as part of Marine Aircraft Group 21, took off from the USS Santee, becoming the first aviation unit to land on Guam as they touched down on Orote Field on 4 August 1944. The first combat air patrols commenced on 7 August 1944. That same evening VMF(N)-534 also conducted its first night raids when a section of aircraft strafed the Japanese garrison on Rota. Between 7 August and 29 December the squadron conducted a total of eight strafing/bombing missions against Rota Island. While on Guam squadron personnel conducted numerous patrols and assisted in burying Japanese war dead. From 4 August through 31 December, VMF(N)-534 flew 1402 sorties totaling 2,610.6 hours of flying conducting nighttime CAP, strafing and bombing, and search missions. Test flight, fighter cover and ferrying missions accounted for another 491.6 hours.

On 20 February 1945, the squadron recorded its only aerial victory of the war when 1stLt Brett Roueche, aided by GCI controllers from Air Warning Squadron 2 stationed aboard a Navy destroyer, shot down a Nakajima C6N 110 miles west of Saipan. In May 1945 the squadron sent a detachment to Kobler Field on Saipan and another to Eniwetok to provide night time cover for each respective area. Tri-site operations continued until the end of the war. The squadron consolidated back on Guam by 22 September 1945.

=== Return to the United States and reorganization ===
The squadron returned to the United States in November 1945 and joined up with the rest of Marine Aircraft Group 53 at Marine Corps Air Station Eagle Mountain Lake, Texas. On 20 December 1945, the squadron moved to Marine Corps Air Station El Centro, California joining Marine Aircraft Group 25. During the end of December VMF(N)-534 also began to receive its new F7F-3N night fighters. On 21 January 1946, all of the squadron's pilots boarded the USS Shangri-La to observe carrier qualifications by United States Navy pilots.

== Aircraft accidents ==
- 7 August 1944 - Capt Paul H. Todd, the squadron executive officer, went missing of the coast of Guam flying an F6F-5N.
- 11 August 1944 - 1st Lt Harley E. Croft was forced to bail out of his F6F-5N after its engine failed during a nighttime CAP.
- 2 November 1944 - 1stLt Percy L. Will's F6F-5N crashed at sea after having engine trouble while flying nighttime combat air patrol in the vicinity of Saipan.
- 18 April 1945 - Capt Charles F. Finnie died from injuries sustained when his F6F-5N crashed.

== See also ==
- United States Marine Corps Aviation
- List of United States Marine Corps aircraft squadrons
- List of decommissioned United States Marine Corps aircraft squadrons
