= VMF(N)-544 =

Marine Night Fighter Squadron 544
- VMF(N)-544 Insignia
- Active: 1 May 1944 – 20 April 1946
- Country: United States
- Allegiance: United States of America
- Branch: United States Marine Corps
- Type: Night fighter squadron
- Role: Air interdiction
- Garrison/HQ: Inactive
- Nickname(s): N/A
- Engagements: None

Marine Night Fighter Squadron 544 (VMF(N)-544) was a night fighter squadron of the United States Marine Corps that was commissioned during World War II. The squadron flew the F6F-5N Hellcat and although it trained for over a year it never made it into combat. The squadron was decommissioned 20 April 1946. To date, no other Marine Corps squadron has carried the lineage and honors of VMF(N)-544.

== History ==
Marine Night Fighter Squadron 544 (VMF(N)-544) was commissioned on 1 May 1944 at Marine Corps Air Station Cherry Point, North Carolina. The squadron immediately began training for aerial combat at night and in poor weather and low visibility. The squadron moved to Marine Corps Air Station El Centro, California in early November 1944, where it continued training for two more months.

In February 1945, VMF(N)-544 again moved, this time to Marine Corps Air Station Eagle Mountain Lake near Fort Worth, Texas. While there, squadron pilots trained with the veteran night aviators from VMF(N)-531 and VMF(N)-534 who had just returned from combat in the South Pacific. VMF(N)-544 never saw combat action as the war with Japan ended before they were due to rotate.

The squadron was decommissioned on 20 April 1946, and has remained inactive since.

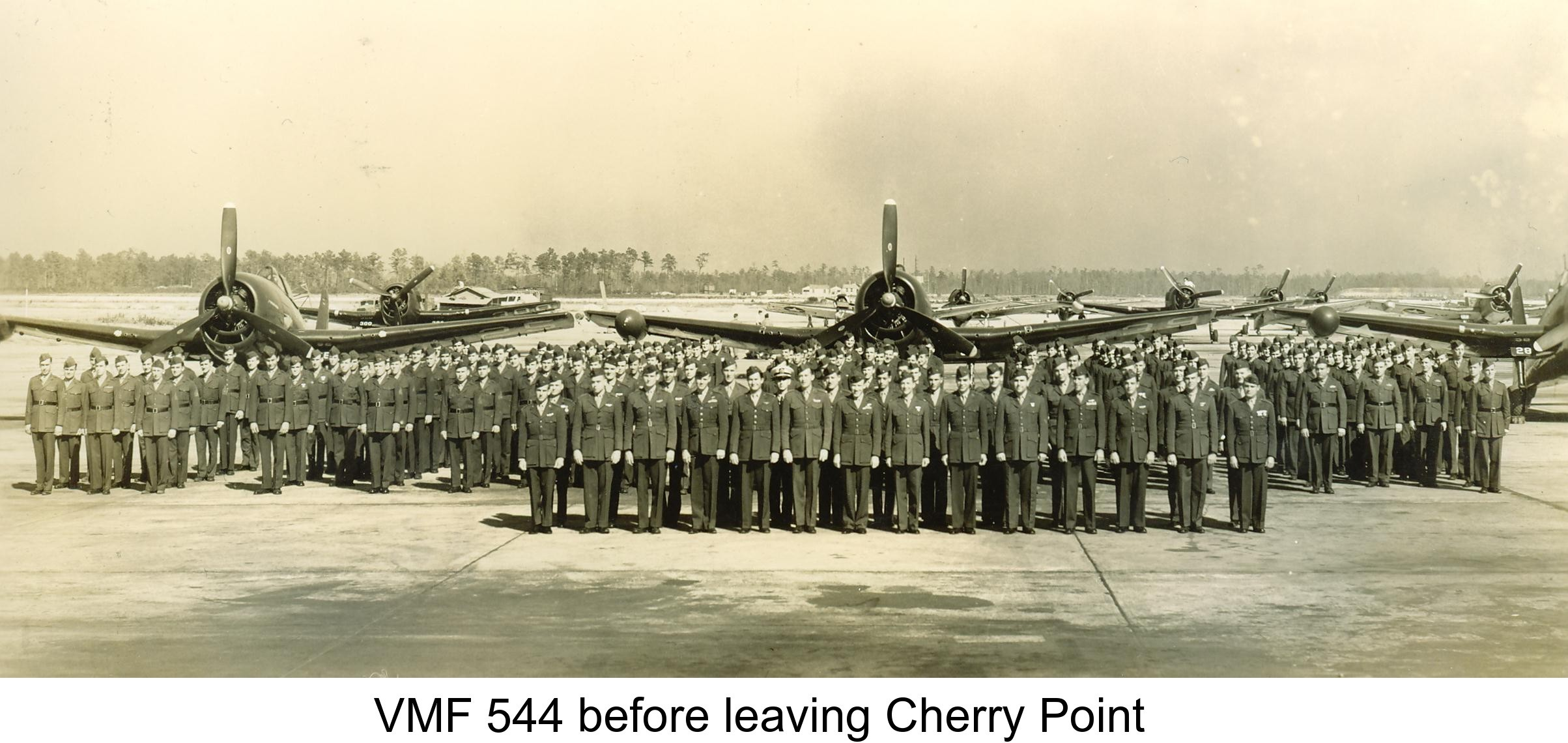

== See also ==
- United States Marine Corps Aviation
- List of United States Marine Corps aircraft squadrons
- List of decommissioned United States Marine Corps aircraft squadrons
