= VMFA-533 =

United States Marine Corps fighter attack squadron

Marine Fighter Attack Squadron 533
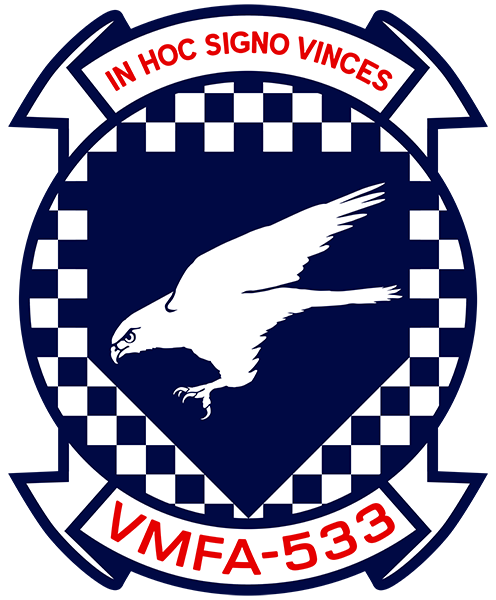
- VMFA-533 Insignia
- Active: 1 October 1943 - present
- Country: United States
- Branch: United States Marine Corps
- Type: Fighter/Attack
- Role: Close air support Air interdiction Aerial reconnaissance
- Part of: Marine Aircraft Group 31; 2nd Marine Aircraft Wing
- Garrison/HQ: Marine Corps Air Station Beaufort
- Nicknames: Hawks; Black Mac's Killers (WWII); Crystal Gazers (WWII)
- Mottos: "In Hoc Signo Vinces" {In this sign you will conquer} "Hawks Hawks Rah Rah!"
- Tail Code: ED
- Engagements: World War II; Battle of Okinawa; Vietnam War; Operation Desert Storm; Kosovo War; Operation Allied Force; Operation Southern Watch; Operation Iraqi Freedom; Operation Inherent Resolve
- Website: official website

Commanders
- Commanding Officer: LtCol Douglas R. Kansier
- Executive Officer: Maj Scott Aquino
- Sergeant Major: SgtMaj Daniel R. Oglesby
- Notable commanders: William H. Fitch; Robert P. Keller

Aircraft flown
- Attack: A-4 Skyhawk (Historic); A-6 Intruder (Historic)
- Fighter: F6F-5N Hellcat (Historic); F7F-3N Tigercat (Historic); F2H-4 Banshee (Historic); F9F Cougar (Historic); F/A-18C/D Hornet (Historic); F-35B Lightning II

Marine Fighter Attack Squadron 533 (VMFA-533) is a United States Marine Corps F-35B squadron. Also known as the "Hawks", the squadron is based at Marine Corps Air Station Beaufort, South Carolina and falls under the command of Marine Aircraft Group 31 (MAG-31) and the 2nd Marine Aircraft Wing (2nd MAW).

== Mission ==
To conduct joint / combined aviation operations in order to support a Marine Air Ground Task Force commander's Command and Control, intelligence, fires, maneuver, and force protection warfighting functions.

== History ==
=== World War II ===
On 1 October 1943, Marine Night Fighter Squadron 533 (VMF(N)-533) was commissioned at Marine Corps Air Station Cherry Point, North Carolina. Originally known as "Black Mac's Killers", after their first commanding officer Major Marion M. Magruder, they were one of three night fighter squadrons to be activated in the Marine Corps and were outfitted with the Grumman F6F-5N Hellcat, equipped with the APS-6 radar. The squadron left for the West Coast in early April and on 16 April, they embarked on board the USS Long Island headed for the South Pacific. In May 1944, the squadron conducted their final training on the F6F aboard Marine Corps Air Station Ewa, Hawaii and then headed for Eniwetok. On 12 June they relieved VMF(N)-532 and assumed night defense responsibilities for the area. On 30 November they moved to Engebi and continued operations.

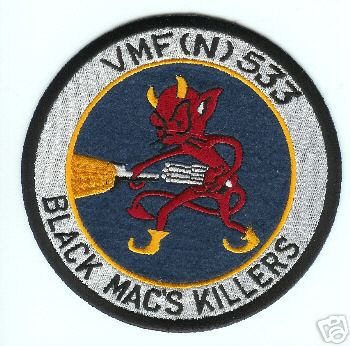
Squadron logo during World War II.

On 7 May 1945, with only two days notice, the squadron of 15 F6F Hellcat planes took off from Engebi with R5C escorts and flew to Saipan, a total of 1,004 nautical miles (1,859 km). This was the longest flight ever over water by a squadron in single engine military aircraft. Each plane had a 150-gallon belly tank, and the squadron had to travel at the speed of the slowest plane

The squadron moved to Yontan Airfield, Okinawa in May 1945 and finally settled on Ie Shima Airfield on 15 June 1945. Between 14 May – 29 June 533 would claim shooting down 30 Japanese planes - by radar, at night - without one operational loss. This was a night fighter record for enemy planes shot down by a single squadron. They also had the first night fighter ace, Captain Robert Baird. The first F7F-2N Tigercat for the squadron arrived on Okinawa the day before the end of the war so it did not see combat. In October 1945, the squadron moved to Nanyuan Airfield near Peiping, China for occupation duty and completed their transition to the new Tigercat. They moved to Hawaii before finally settling back in the U.S. at MCAS Cherry Point in January 1947. 533 would spend the Korean War there as well, training Tigercat aircrew for night combat overseas.

=== 1950s - 1960s ===
533 entered the jet age in May 1953 with its acquisition of the F2H-4 Banshee, and changed their nickname to Black Diamonds. They saw several carrier deployments in the ensuing years, followed by another transition to the F9F Cougar in 1957. Yet another change was soon to follow as the squadron received the A4D Skyhawk in 1959, and with it a redesignation to Marine Attack Squadron 533 (VMA-533). The squadron adopted the name, Hawks, in honor of their new aircraft. The next change was to come in 1965 when the Hawks received the A-6A Intruder, giving them an all-weather capability and the appropriate change in title, VMA(AW)-533.

=== The Vietnam War ===
Soon after transitioning to the A-6, VMA(AW)533 deployed to Chu Lai Air Base, Republic of Vietnam on April 1, 1967, to support combat operations. It was the first A-6A squadron in Marine Aircraft Group 12 and remained there from 1967 to 1969, then redeploying to Marine Corps Air Station Iwakuni, Japan. All told, VMA(AW)-533 accumulated over 10,000 combat sorties in these busy years, garnering them the Commandant’s Aviation Efficiency Trophy. In one noted incident, on 25 October 1967, three A-6A Intruders from VMA(AW)-533 attacked the Phúc Yên Air Base outside of Hanoi and the action was so intense all three pilots were awarded the Navy Cross. These pilots were among the few aviators to receive Navy Crosses awarded to fixed wing pilots during the Vietnam War.

This would not be the last time that the Hawks would see combat over Southeast Asia. They returned to service over Vietnam in 1972, deploying for a year to Royal Thai Air Base Nam Phong, Thailand. They were soon flying mission over Cambodia and Laos, as well. They returned to MCAS Iwakuni in September 1973, and then to MCAS Cherry Point in November 1975, where they received their first A-6E the following year.

=== The Gulf War & the 1990s ===
The squadron deployed to Bahrain in December 1990 for Operation Desert Shield and Operation Desert Storm. Following participation in those hostilities, VMA(AW)-533 returned home after an "around the world" deployment that lasted eleven and a half months.

1 September 1992 brought many changes to 533, most notably a change to the new F/A-18D Hornet, and with this its newest and current designation, and a move to Marine Corps Air Station Beaufort, South Carolina. This made them the first all-weather fighter attack squadron in 2nd Marine Aircraft Wing. These techniques would soon be put to the test when VMFA(AW)-533 was deployed to Aviano Air Base in July 1993. They returned three times over the next five years, flying a wide variety of missions to support NATO operations. In 1999, the squadron supported Operation Allied Force in Yugoslavia from Taszar Air Base Hungary and flew 111 combat sorties during the conflict. After the cease-fire of 11 June 1999, the Hawks flew an additional 82 combat sorties to ensure Serb compliance with the withdrawal from Kosovo.

=== Global War on Terrorism ===
The squadron deployed to the Kuwait supporting Operation Southern Watch and Operation Iraqi Freedom, arriving at Al-Jaber Air Base on 11 February 2003. On 20 March, coalition forces began the ground offensive with support from the squadron’s Hornets. While operating around the clock, the squadron expended over 800,000 pounds of ordnance, flying 558 sorties and 1440 flight hours. For their support of the successful campaign against the Iraqi regime, the Hawks were awarded another Presidential Unit Citation. In the Spring of 2006 they redeployed to Iraq in support of Operation Iraqi Freedom. In February 2008 the squadron deployed to Marine Corps Air Station Iwakuni, Japan as part of the Unit Deployment Program in which they were the first east coast squadron to deploy straight from MCAS Beaufort directly to Yecheon Air Base, South Korea. In September 2008 the squadron returned to MCAS Beaufort. Summer of 2009, and March–October’s of 2014, and 2018 the squadron deployed to MCAS Iwakuni to take part in the Unit Deployment Program. During their 2009 UDP, they provided real-time imagery and reconnaissance during relief efforts in the Philippines following Typhoon Ketsana. In 2014 and specifically 2018 the focus was in the Korea Area of Operations as tensions were heightened throughout the Pacific.

=== Transition to F-35B Lightning II ===
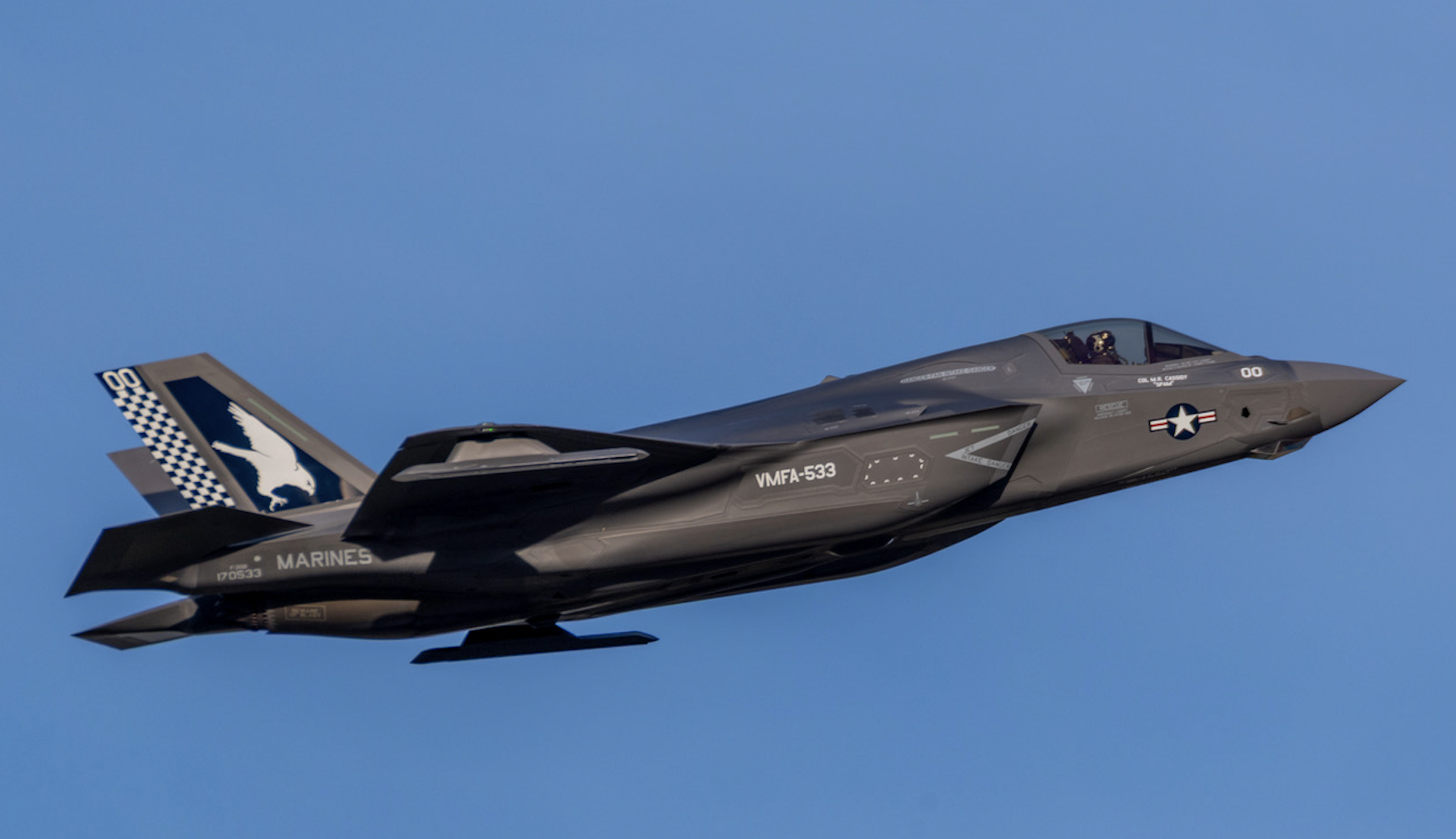
VMFA-553's F-35B Livery

In late 2024, VMFA-533 officially received their first F-35B Lightning and by 2025, the squadron has acquired multiple jets.

== Notable former members ==
- Colonel Robert Baird - Flew with the squadron during the Battle of Okinawa. He was awarded the Navy Cross and was the first and only Marine night fighter ace of World War II. Additionally, he was the only Marine F6F Hellcat ace of the war.
- MajGen Charles F. Bolden Jr. - former Administrator of NASA, retired United States Marine Corps Major General, and a former astronaut who flew on four Space Shuttle missions.
- Capt Fred W. Haise Jr. - former NASA astronaut, engineer, U.S. Marine Corps fighter pilot, and U.S. Air Force test pilot. He is one of only 24 people to have flown to the Moon, having flown as Lunar Module pilot on Apollo 13.
- 1st Lt Maynard C. Kelley - posthumously awarded the Navy Cross for his actions in defense of Yontan Airfield after Japanese aircraft crashed landed on the field with commandos on board during the night of 24-25 May 1945.
- Col Marion M. Magruder - first commanding officer of VMF(N)-533

== Gallery ==
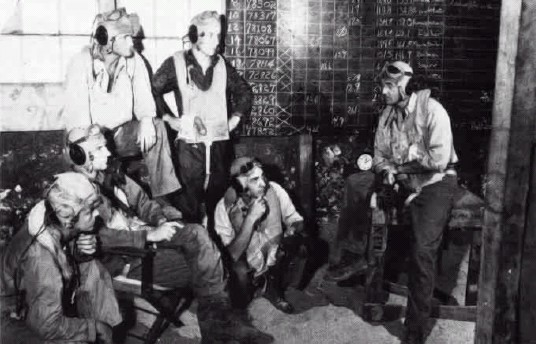
Pilot briefing on Okinawa

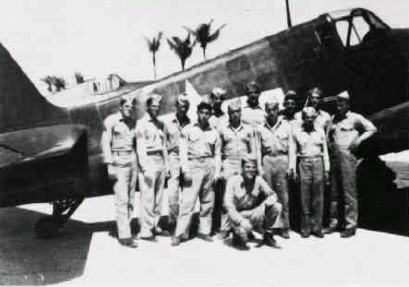
VMF(N)-533 pilots on Okinawa, 1945

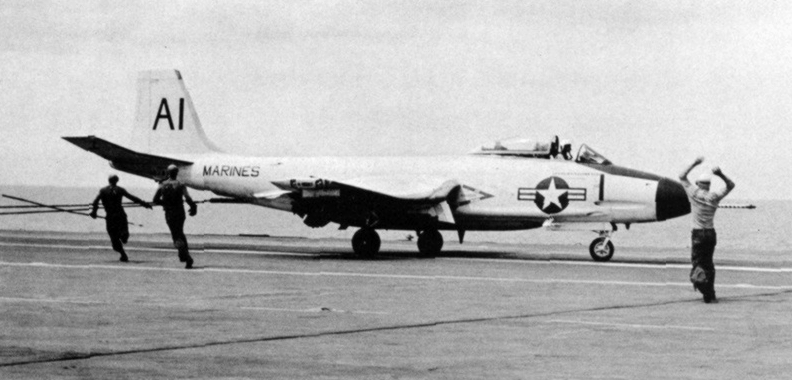
A VMF-533 F2H-4 on USS Franklin D. Roosevelt, 1956.

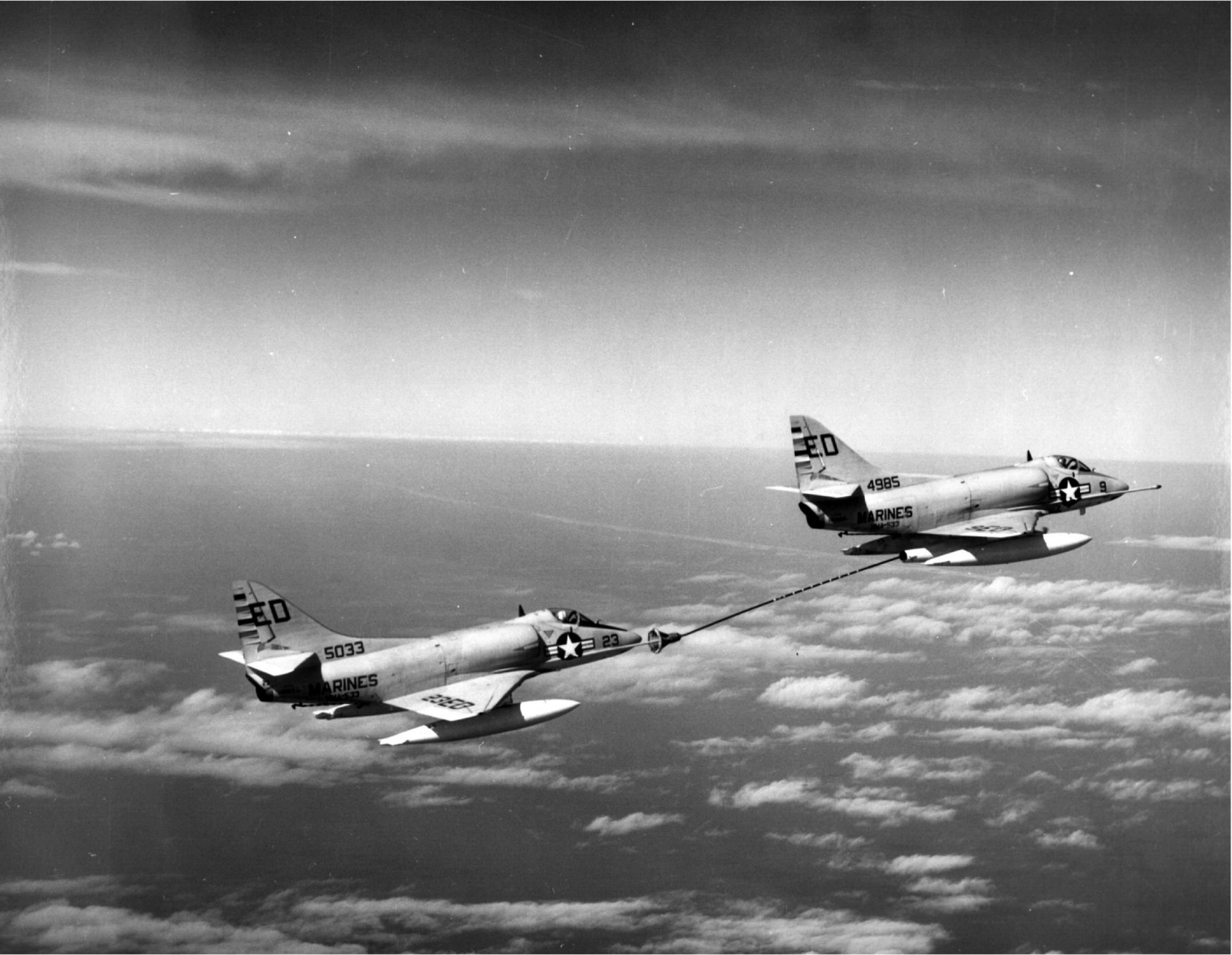
A-4Cs of VMA-533 during in flight refueling

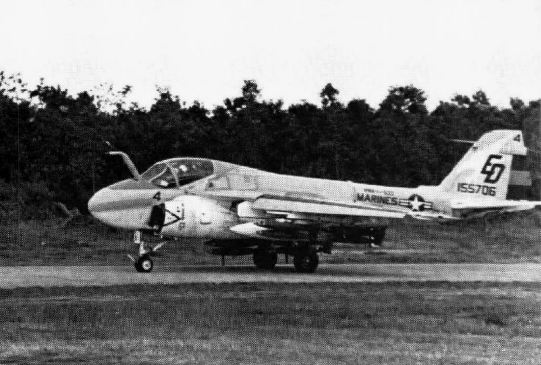
A VMA(AW)-533 A-6A Intruder at Nam Phong, 1973

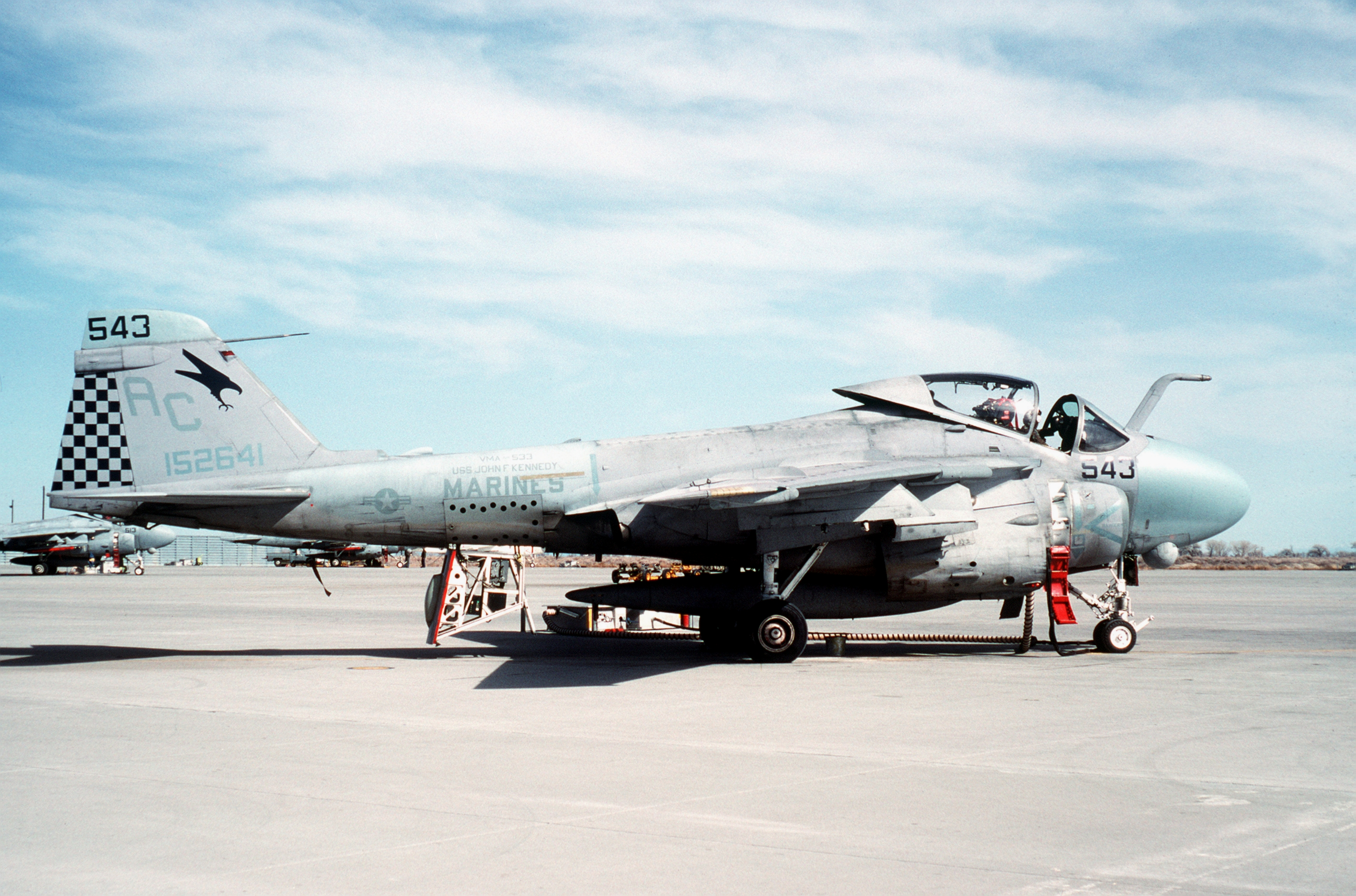
VMA(AW)-533 A-6E Intruder at NAS Fallon, 1988

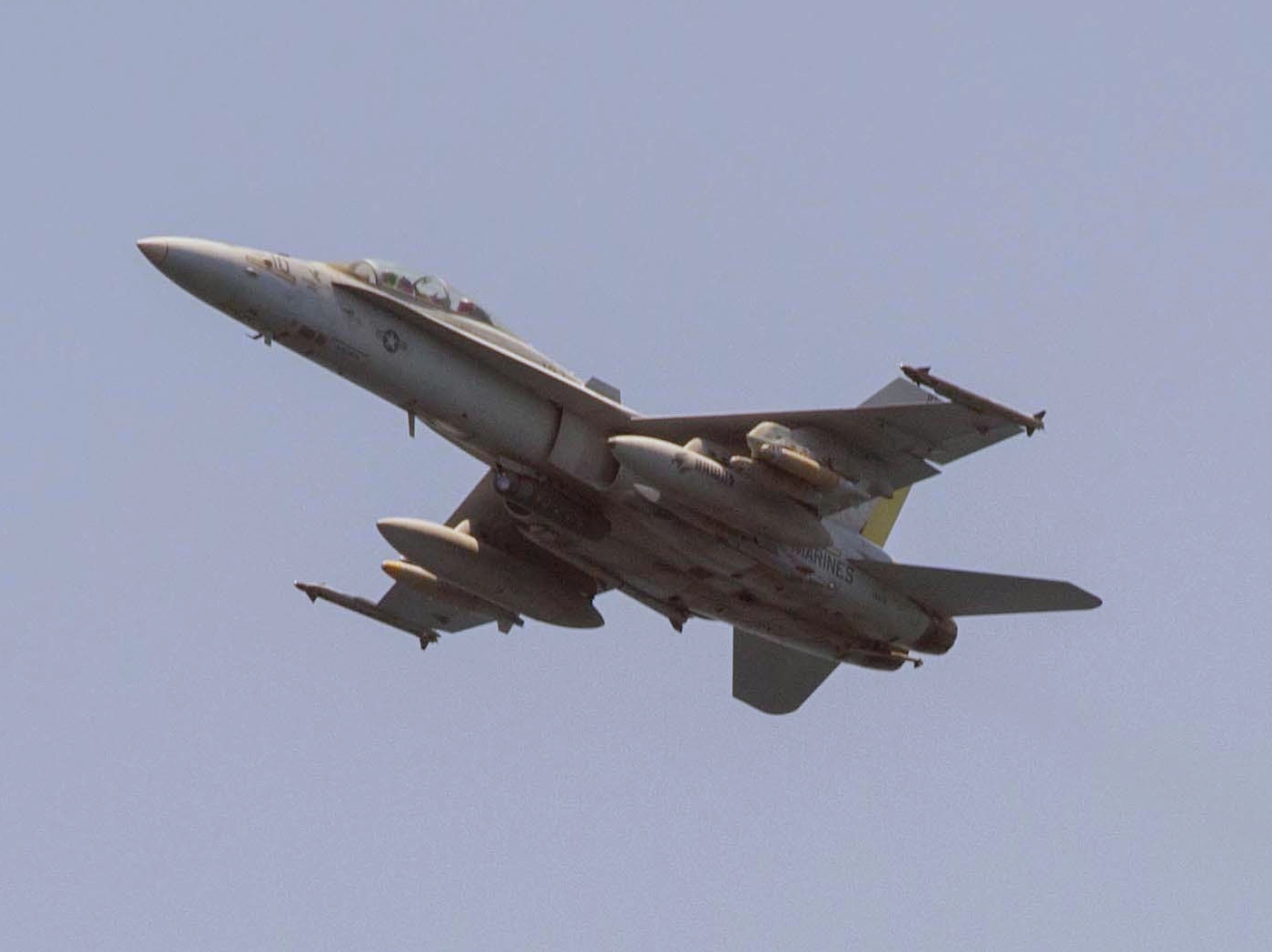
F/A-18D Hornet from VMFA(AW)-533 over the Persian Gulf in July 2016

== See also ==
- United States Marine Corps Aviation
- List of active United States Marine Corps aircraft squadrons
- List of inactive United States Marine Corps aircraft squadrons
