= Air Warning Squadron 2 =

- Active: 25 Sept 1943 – 15 Feb 46
- Country: United States
- Allegiance: United States of America
- Branch: United States Marine Corps
- Type: Aviation Command & Control
- Role: Aerial surveillance & early warning

Air Warning Squadron 2 (AWS-2) was a United States Marine Corps aviation command and control squadron during World War II. The squadron was tasked to provide aerial surveillance and early warning during amphibious assaults. They took part in the Battle of Guam in 1944 and would eventually move to Peleliu in 1945 assuming responsibility for air defense in that sector until the end of the war. The squadron departed Peleliu for the United States in January 1946 and was quickly decommissioned upon its arrival in California. To date, no other Marine Corps squadron has carried the lineage and honors of AWS-2 to include Marine Air Control Squadron 2 (MACS-2).

== Mission ==
(Primary) – Operation in the Pacific Ocean Area. To furnish early warning information on approaching air and sea attack and to furnish fighter direction against this attack.

(Secondary) – Participation in the local defense when released to the operational control of the Hawaiian Sea Frontier and/or the Seventh Army Air Force Fighter Command

== History ==
=== Organization and training ===
Air Warning Squadron 2 was commissioned on 25 September 1943 at Marine Corps Air Station Cherry Point, North Carolina. At commissioning the squadron consisted of 8 officers and 146 enlisted men. Because it was one of the first two air warning squadrons formed in the Marine Corps during the war, its early training was severely hampered by personnel and equipment shortages. Prior to deploying overseas the only gear available to the squadron was shared amongst other units of the 1st Marine Air Warning Group.

AWS-2 departed North Carolina on 15 November 1943 with orders to proceed to the West Coast of the United States. The squadron finally received a portion of its own gear just prior to departing San Diego. The partially equipped squadron arrived at Marine Corps Air Station Ewa, Hawaii on 9 January 1944 with 14 officers and 219 enlisted men.

Additional equipment was received at MCAS Ewa and the squadron was able to complete calibration flights by the end of the month. Operational training for men and equipment started with simulated field conditions for area aircraft-warning coverage and fighter direction to protect the area from day and night bomber attack. This lasted until April. During this time AWS-2 also assisted various air-warning and tower control units in the Hawaiian area with communications checks, relaying of messages and homing lost planes.

=== Guam, Ulithi and Peleliu ===
On 16 May 1944, 4 officers and 64 enlisted men were transferred to the III Amphibious Corps at Guadalcanal, and formed an air-warning assault echelon. The rest of the squadron departed Hawaii on 1 June 1944. Both echelons were bound for Guam. The assault echelon landed on Guam 21 July 1944 and three days later the first Marine radar set reported on the air. The larger portion of the squadron arrived 27 July 1944 with the final Marines arriving from MCAS Ewa on 10 August 1944. A week later the squadron's SCR-270 radar was operational on the south end of Orote Field. The squadron operated two long range search radars (SCR-270s), one ground controlled intercept (GCI) radar (SCR-527) and an air defense control center which received information from additional reporting radars on Guam and in the Marianas area. During this time the squadron was responsible for supplying air warning and fighter direction against air and sea attacks for the Air Defense Command of Guam and the Mariana Islands.

In December 1944 the squadron started experiments with window and by February 1945 they were practicing with pilots in simulated day fighter interception tactics. On 2 February 1945, controllers from AWS-2, working aboard a US Navy destroyer, controlled fighters from VMF(N)-534 for their first successful interception of the war when two F6F Hellcats engaged a Nakajima C6N 110 miles northeast of Saipan. Early in March 1945, AWS-2 Marines were sent to Ulithi and Peleliu to prepare facilities on those islands as portions of AWS-2 would be relieving United States Navy ARGUS units of their air defense responsibilities.

By early May 1945 the squadron headquarters was formed at Peleliu with detachments on Ulithi and Falalop. AWS-2 was responsible for air defense of this region until the end of the war.

The squadron returned to the United States in February 1946 and was quickly decommissioned on 15 February 1946.

== Commanding Officers ==
- Capt George T. C. Fry - 1 September 1943 – 15 December 1944
- Capt Lumir F. Slezak - 16 December 1944 – 17 June 1945
- Capt Charles K. Dyer - 18 June 1945 – 5 July 1945
- Maj Frank B. Freese - 5 July - unknown

== Unit awards ==
A unit citation or commendation is an award bestowed upon an organization for the action cited. Members of the unit who participated in said actions are allowed to wear on their uniforms the awarded unit citation. What follows is an incomplete list of the awards AWS-2 has been presented with:

Streamer	Award	Year(s)	Additional Info
	Navy Unit Commendation	1944	Guam, Marianas Islands
	American Defense Service Streamer with one Bronze Star		World War II
	Asiatic-Pacific Campaign Streamer with one Bronze Star		Guam
	World War II Victory Streamer	1941–1945	Pacific War

== See also ==
- Aviation combat element
- United States Marine Corps Aviation
- List of United States Marine Corps aviation support squadrons
