= USS Hyde =

Haskell-class attack transport

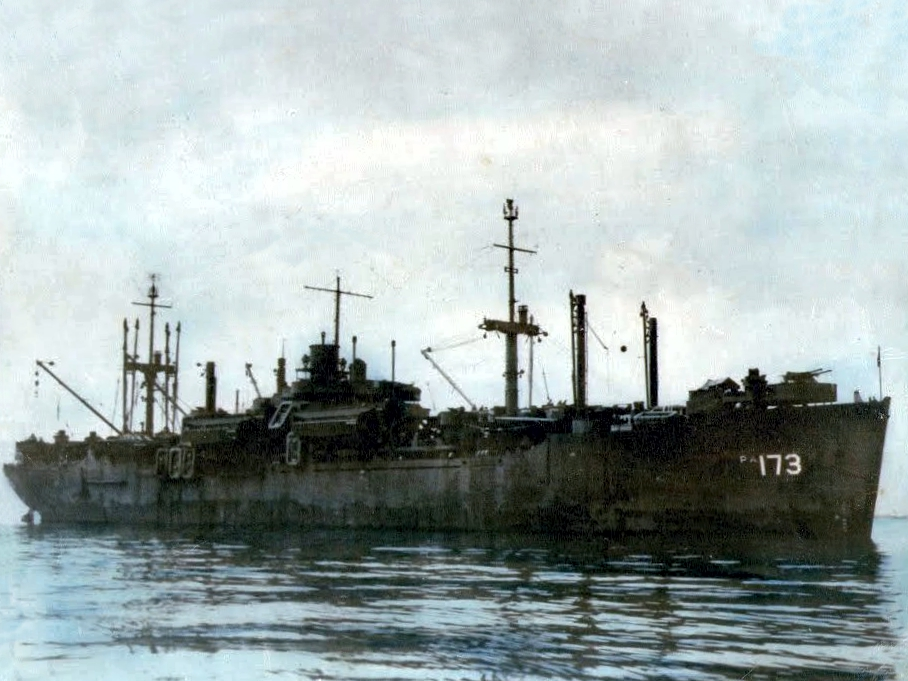

History

United States
- Name: USS Hyde
- Namesake: Hyde County, North Carolina; Hyde County, South Dakota
- Ordered: as type VC2-S-AP5
- Launched: 30 October 1944
- Acquired: 26 November 1944
- Commissioned: 26 November 1944
- Decommissioned: 14 May 1946
- Stricken: 5 June 1946
- Fate: Disposed of in 1973

General characteristics
- Displacement: 12,450 tons (full load)
- Length: 455 ft 0 in (138.68 m)
- Beam: 62 ft 0 in (18.90 m)
- Draught: 24 ft 0 in (7.32 m)
- Speed: 19 knots
- Capacity: 150,000 cu. ft, 2,900 tons
- Complement: 56 Officers 480 Enlisted
- Armament: one 5 in (130 mm) gun mount, four 40 mm gun mounts, ten 20 mm gun mounts

USS Hyde (APA/LPA-173) was a Haskell-class attack transport in service with the United States Navy from 1944 to 1946. She was scrapped in 1973.

== History ==
Hyde was launched under United States Maritime Commission contract by Oregon Shipbuilding Corp., Portland, Oregon, 30 October 1944; sponsored by Mrs. James H. Bond; and commissioned 26 November 1944.

=== World War II ===
Following a brief shakedown cruise, Hyde arrived Seattle, Washington, 27 January 1945 to embark troops and cargo, after which she sailed for Pearl Harbor in convoy 1 February. Carrying reinforcements for the Pacific Ocean campaign, then drawing to its climax, Hyde stopped at Eniwetok before anchoring at Iwo Jima 13 March. The ship remained off that battle-scarred island only long enough to unload, then steamed to Guam 15 March, where she embarked over 400 marine casualties. Hyde continued to Pearl Harbor, loaded more casualties 29 March, and arrived San Francisco, California, 22 May 1945.

By June the Okinawa campaign, last step on the island road to Japan, was well underway, and Hyde sailed 6 June with cargo and troops. After stopping at Ulithi she arrived Okinawa 24 July. There she discharged her passengers and cargo under constant threat of air attack, getting underway for Ulithi 6 August. During this stay at the giant staging base, Hyde received the news of the surrender of Japan.

The transport immediately took up duties in connection with the occupation. She arrived Leyte 21 August, loaded troops, and disembarked them with the early occupation forces 8 September at Yokohama. Hyde then took on board Allied prisoners of war for transportation to Guam, where she arrived 23 September. Sailing to Qingdao 11 October, the transport debarked U.S. marines for the occupation of China and to aid in the stabilization of that troubled country. She then steamed to Manila and thence to Haiphong, Indochina, arriving 2 November. At Haiphong, Hyde embarked 200 Nationalist Chinese troops for further transfer to Chinwangtao, China, and unloaded them 12 November to aid in the occupation. After a stop at Taku, the transport arrived Sasebo, Japan, 4 December 1945 to join in "Operation Magic Carpet," the vast operation designed to return veterans with the greatest possible speed. Hyde sailed for California 7 December and arrived San Diego, California, 22 December.

=== Decommissioning and fate ===
After a second voyage, to Pearl Harbor and back, she sailed 16 February 1946 via Panama for Norfolk, Virginia. She arrived there 13 March, decommissioned 14 May and returned to the United States Maritime Commission 2 days later. She was placed in the National Defense Reserve Fleet, redesignated an amphibious transport, and berthed on the James River, near Norfolk, Virginia. She was sold for scrapping in Spain on 17 September 1973.

== Awards ==
Hyde received one battle star for World War II service.
