= Robert Baird (flying ace) =

American flying ace

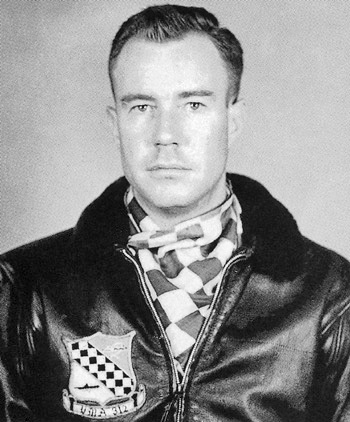
- Born: November 13, 1921; Los Angeles, California, US
- Died: July 7, 1992 (aged 70); Sonoma County, California, US
- Burial place: Arlington National Cemetery
- Military career
- Allegiance: United States
- Branch: United States Navy; United States Marine Corps
- Service years: 1942–1971
- Rank: Colonel
- Service number: 0-20565
- Unit: Marine Night Fighting Squadron 533 (VMF(N)-533)
- Conflicts: World War II: Battle of Okinawa; Korean War; Vietnam War
- Awards: Navy Cross; Silver Star; Legion of Merit w/ Combat "V"; Distinguished Flying Cross

Robert Baird (November 13, 1921 – July 7, 1992) was a highly decorated United States Marine Corps Colonel. During World War II, he shot down a total of six Japanese planes and was awarded the Navy Cross, making him the only Marine night fighter ace of the war.

== Early life and career ==
Robert Baird was born on November 13, 1921, in Los Angeles, California. He enlisted in the United States Navy on July 30, 1942. Entering the Aviation Cadet Program, he was designated a Naval aviator and received his commission as a second lieutenant in the Marine Corps on March 1, 1943.

Baird was assigned to Marine Night Fighter Squadron 532 (VMF(N)-532) at Marine Corps Air Station Cherry Point, North Carolina in June 1943. He was with that squadron when it deployed to the Pacific Theater in February 1944. Baird returned to the United States that November.

== Battle of Okinawa ==
Baird deployed to the Pacific for a second tour, joining Marine Night Fighter Squadron 533 (VMF(N)-533). On May 7, 1945, the squadron flew its 15 F6F Hellcats over 1,000 miles from Saipan to Okinawa, the longest flight over water by a single-engine aircraft squadron during World War II. Arriving at Okinawa, Baird and the rest of his squadron landed at Yontan Field. The squadron operated off of Ie Shima.

On the night of June 9, Captain Baird used his radar to score his first victory, a Japanese reconnaissance plane. The night of June 16, Baird shot down two more enemy aircraft, including one bomber.

On the night of June 22, which was officially the last day of the battle of Okinawa, Captain Baird claimed two more victories, along with ace status. Baird would claim his sixth and final kill of the war on the night of July 13.

Captain Baird became the first and only Marine night fighter ace of World War II. Additionally, he was the only Marine F6F Hellcat ace of the war. Baird was awarded multiple medals for his skillful airmanship during this time, including the Navy Cross, the Silver Star, and the Distinguished Flying Cross.

== Later career and life ==
Baird returned to the United States in September 1945, where he was assigned to several different squadrons at Cherry Point for the next two years. After a few months at Quantico, Virginia, he was ordered to Marine Corps Air Station El Toro, California in November 1948.

In October 1950, Baird deployed to Korea, where he served with several different night fighter squadrons until September 1951. After the Korean War, he was again assigned to several different units at Quantico, Cherry Point, and El Toro. In the late 1950s, Baird was stationed at Naval Air Station Atsugi, Japan, and then Marine Corps Air Station Kaneohe Bay in Hawaii until January 1961.

From mid 1961 to mid 1965, Baird was assigned to Headquarters Marine Corps in the Pentagon. He then spent the next two years at Naval Air Station Alameda, California. In August 1967, he deployed to Vietnam, where he served as the Chief of Staff for the 1st Marine Aircraft Wing until September of the following year. He was awarded the Legion of Merit for his service in Vietnam.

Baird retired from the Marine Corps with the rank of colonel on July 1, 1971. Robert Baird died on July 7, 1992, in Sonoma County, California. He was buried in Arlington National Cemetery.

== Awards and decorations ==
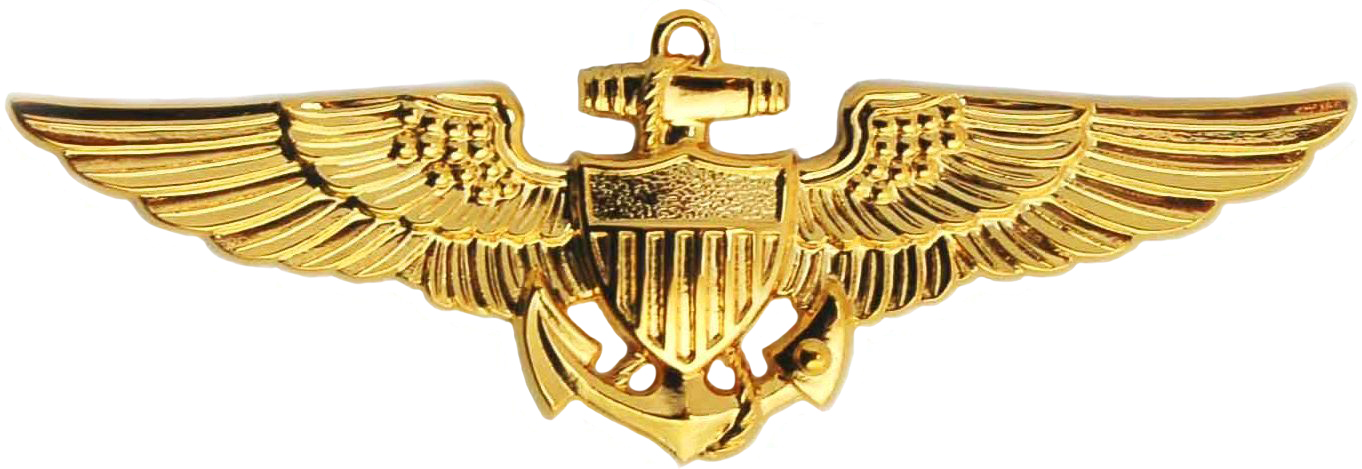

United States Naval Aviator Badge
Navy Cross
Silver Star	Legion of Merit w/ Combat "V"	Distinguished Flying Cross
Air Medal w/ 5/16" Silver Star and 5/16" Gold Star	Combat Action Ribbon	Navy Presidential Unit Citation w/ 3/16" Bronze Star
American Campaign Medal	Asiatic-Pacific Campaign Medal w/ three 3/16" bronze stars	World War II Victory Medal
National Defense Service Medal w/ 3/16" Bronze Star	Korean Service Medal w/ three 3/16" Bronze Stars	Vietnam Service Medal w/ 3/16" Bronze Star
Vietnam Armed Forces Honor Medal (First Class)	Republic of Korea Presidential Unit Citation	Republic of Vietnam Gallantry Cross Unit Citation
United Nations Korea Medal	Vietnam Campaign Medal	Republic of Korea War Service Medal

=== Navy Cross citation ===
Citation:

For extraordinary heroism as Pilot of a Fighter Plane in Marine Night Fighting Squadron FIVE HUNDRED THIRTY-THREE in action against enemy Japanese forces in the vicinity of Okinawa Shima, Ryukyu Group, on the nights of 9 June, 16 June and 13 July 1945. Courageous and aggressive while engaged in combat air patrol, CaptainRobert Baird skillfully employed his radar to make contact with an enemy reconnaissance plane on 9 June and, striking quickly and furiously at low altitude, destroyed the hostile aircraft. Again, while on combat air patrol on the night of 16 June, he intercepted an enemy bomber and, pressing home a determined run, shot down the hostile plane. Later, the same night by making excellent use of his radar, he established contact with another Japanese aircraft and destroyed it. Captain Baird's fourth kill during this period occurred on the night of 13 July when, after establishing radar contact with an enemy bomber, he fearlessly closed in and, firing bursts from all six guns, shot down the hostile aircraft. His courage, daring airmanship and devotion to duty were in keeping with the highest traditions of the United States Naval Service.
