= Marine Aircraft Group 53 =

- Active: 1 April 1943 - 31 May 1947
- Country: United States of America
- Branch: United States Marine Corps
- Role: Training

Commanders
- Notable commanders: Frank Schwable; Marion M. Magruder

Marine Aircraft Group 53 (MAG-53) was a United States Marine Corps night fighter training group that was commissioned during World War II. It was the first night-fighter group in the Marine Corps. During the course of the war the group trained eight night fighting squadrons and sent seven of them into combat. The group was decommissioned after the war during the post-war drawdown of forces.

== History ==
Marine Night Fighting Group 53 (MAG(N)-53) was formed on 1 April 1943, at Marine Corps Air Station Cherry Point, North Carolina. It was the first night fighter group in the Marine Corps and was responsible for the training of all VMF(N) squadrons. The group trained in Vero Beach, Florida in the spring and summer of 1944 and moved to Marine Corps Air Station Eagle Mountain Lake, Texas in November 1944. MAG(N)-53 was re-designated Marine Night Fighter Group 53 (MNFG 53) in April 1945. The group remained in Texas until the end of the war.

The group moved back to MCAS Cherry Point in February 1946 and changed its name again, this time to Marine Aircraft Group 53 (MAG-53) in November of that year. The group was decommissioned on 31 May 1947.

== See also ==
- United States Marine Corps Aviation
- List of United States Marine Corps aircraft groups

== Notes ==
This article incorporates text in the public domain from the United States Marine Corps.
