= USS Winged Arrow =

History

United States
- Name: Winged Arrow
- Builder: Moore Dry Dock Company, Oakland, California
- Laid down: 26 January 1943
- Launched: 3 April 1943
- Acquired: 21 April 1944
- Commissioned: 21 April 1944
- Decommissioned: 12 August 1946
- Stricken: 28 August 1946
- Identification: U.S. Official Number: 244287
- Honors and awards: 4 battle stars (World War II)
- Fate: Scrapped, 1970

General characteristics
- Class & type: La Salle-class transport
- Displacement: 6,556 long tons (6,661 t) light; 13,910 long tons (14,133 t) full
- Length: 459 ft 2 in (139.95 m)
- Beam: 63 ft (19 m)
- Draft: 25 ft 9 in (7.85 m)
- Propulsion: Steam turbine, single propeller, 6,000 hp (4,474 kW)
- Speed: 16 knots (30 km/h; 18 mph)
- Troops: 1,575
- Complement: 276
- Armament: 1 × single 5"/38 caliber gun; 4 × single 3"/50 caliber guns; 12 × single 20 mm guns

USS Winged Arrow (AP-170) was a La Salle-class transport of the United States Navy. The La Salle class transport had a displacement of almost 14,000 long tons (14,000 t) and were designed to ferry troops and supplies to and from the war zone during World War II.

== Construction and early operation ==
Winged Arrow was laid down 26 January 1943 as a Maritime Commission type (C2-S-B1) hull, under Maritime Commission contract as hull 243 (MC hull 1156) at Moore Dry Dock Company in Oakland, California, and launched 3 April 1943. Winged Arrow, U.S. Official Number 244287, was delivered to the War Shipping Administration on 12 June 1943 as a freighter operated for the WSA by its agent McCormick Steamship Company under a General Agency Agreement (GAA). The ship was converted into a troop ship by Hurley Machine Works, Oakland with conversion completed 21 April 1944.

== Navy service ==
Winged Arrow was acquired by the Navy from the War Shipping Administration under bareboat charter on 21 April 1944 and commissioned that same day as USS Winged Arrow (AP-170) and immediately entered troop transport service.

=== Saipan ===
On 30 April, Winged Arrow put to sea with a full complement of Army replacement troops, bound for Oahu where she arrived on 6 May. There, she practiced amphibious operations with soldiers from the Army's 27th Division in preparation for the occupation of the Mariana Islands. At the end of May, she departed Pearl Harbor with troops embarked, bound for Kwajalein in the Marshalls where she arrived on 9 June. Since Winged Arrow's embarked troops were assigned to the floating reserve, they were not scheduled to be on hand at Saipan on "D-day". Therefore, she remained at Kwajalein for several days before departing there on a schedule calculated to put her off Saipan on 17 June, two days after the initial assault. The following day, she transferred her troops to LSTs; and they landed at Agingan Point on Saipan. The transport then retired to Eniwetok to prepare for the second phase of the Marianas operation, the landings on Tinian.

=== Tinian ===
After a somewhat lengthy wait at Eniwetok occasioned by the unexpectedly difficult task of rooting out the defenders of Saipan, Winged Arrow returned to the island on 19 July and retracted units of the 2nd Marine Division for the Tinian assault. On the morning of 24 July, she and several other ships carried that division, made up of the 2nd and 8th Marine Regiments, around to the southwestern coast of Tinian opposite Tinian Town where they feigned a landing to draw enemy forces from the real objective on the eastern coast. Upon concluding the feint, Winged Arrow transported the marines back around to waters off the actual invasion beaches where they remained in the floating reserve. On the 26th, they went ashore to reinforce and support the 4th Marine Division during the reduction of Tinian.

Winged Arrow then embarked passengers, including 458 Japanese prisoners of war, at Saipan for transportation to Pearl Harbor. After disembarking the passengers at Oahu on 10 August, the transport continued eastward to San Francisco, where she arrived on 19 August. She completed almost a month's availability at San Francisco and then moved to San Diego on 19 September. There, she embarked a Marine Corps aviation unit for transportation to the Marshalls. She departed San Diego on 21 September and, after stops at Pearl Harbor and Majuro, disembarked her passengers at Roi islet in Kwajalein Atoll on 15 October. She embarked more passengers there and got underway again on 22 October, bound ultimately for Hollandia on the northern coast of New Guinea. After stops at Majuro and Manus in the Admiralty Islands, the transport arrived at Hollandia on 21 November. At the New Guinea base, the ship began preparations for the invasion of Luzon in the Philippines.

=== Lingayen Gulf ===
Early in January 1945, she embarked troops of the Army's I Corps, probably units of the 158th Regimental Combat Team, and sailed for Lingayen Gulf on the northwestern coast of Luzon as a part of Rear Admiral Richard L. Conolly's Reinforcement Group (Task Group 77.9). She and the other ships of her task group arrived off Lingayen on 11 January, two days after the initial assault. Her troops eventually landed near Mabilao about 15 miles east of the town of Lingayen itself and moved up to support other I Corps troops already engaged with the Japanese. During her stay at Lingayen Gulf, Winged Arrow was straddled by bombs and near-misses by a kamikaze who crashed close aboard her bow, but she performed her part in the operation without suffering casualties or damage.

=== Leyte ===
She departed Lingayen on the night of 12 and 13 January, joined a convoy of fast transports, and shaped a course for Leyte Gulf. En route, the convoy suffered another kamikaze attack. One of the intruders succeeded in crashing into Zeilin (AP-9), but Winged Arrow again escaped damage. After about a week at Leyte, the transport carried more reinforcements to Luzon, landing them just north of Subic Bay at La Paz. She returned to Leyte and remained there until 16 February when she got underway with a Ulithi-bound convoy which included her damaged former travelling mate, Zeilin. The task unit reached Ulithi on 18 February, but Winged Arrow did not remain there long. Continuing her voyage, she stopped at recently invaded Iwo Jima where she embarked units of the 5th Marine Division for transportation to Hawaii. After disembarking the marines at Hilo and spending from 12 to 17 April in the islands, she resumed her voyage to the west coast of the United States and entered San Francisco Bay on the 23rd.

=== Okinawa ===
Winged Arrow spent almost a month undergoing repairs at San Francisco. She departed that port on 16 May and headed north to Seattle where she arrived on the 19th. She embarked Army replacement troops for the Okinawa campaign and got underway again on 22 May. She made brief stops at Pearl Harbor, Eniwetok, and Ulithi before arriving in the Ryukyus in June. She remained at Okinawa until 8 July when she headed back to Pearl Harbor with 1,056 Japanese prisoners of war embarked. Steaming via Saipan and Eniwetok, she reached Oahu on 22 July. After unloading the prisoners of war, she took on a mixed group of passengers, which included male and female members of the armed forces as well as male and female civilians, for transportation back to the United States. The transport stood out of Pearl Harbor on 24 July and arrived in San Francisco six days later.

The ship underwent a round of voyage repairs at San Francisco before returning to sea on 11 August. En route to the western Pacific, she received word of the Japanese capitulation on 14 August. She made brief calls at Eniwetok and Ulithi before arriving at her destination, Leyte, on the day of the actual surrender ceremony, 2 September 1945.

=== Post-war ===
After a side trip to Tacloban, Winged Arrow departed the Philippines on 5 September with 1,500 returning Americans embarked. She made a two-day stop at Ulithi and arrived in San Francisco once again prior to returning to the Far East. She arrived at Saipan in the Marianas in mid-October and picked up more returning troops there and at Guam and Tinian before getting underway on the 27th to transport them back to the United States. The ship entered San Francisco once again on 10 November but departed again for the Orient two weeks later. This time, her destination was Jinsen, Korea, where she arrived on 13 December and probably disembarked occupation troops before heading back to the United States on the 15th. She arrived in Seattle early in January 1946 and remained there until the 28th when she put to sea once again, bound for Asia. The ship arrived at Shanghai, China, on 14 February and remained there until the 17th at which time she headed south to Hong Kong for a two-day visit before heading back to the west coast. Winged Arrow left Hong Kong on 22 February; stopped along the way at Guam, Truk, and Wake Island; and reentered Seattle on 29 March.

The transport embarked upon her final voyage for the Navy on 14 April 1946. She made a stop at San Francisco and then shaped a course back to the Philippines on 26 April. Winged Arrow stood into Manila Bay on 14 May, moved to Subic Bay on 15 May, and headed for Samar on the 16th. She stopped only briefly at Samar on the 18th and then pointed her bow eastward. She concluded her final transpacific voyage for the Navy at San Francisco on 5 June 1946.

=== Decommissioning and sale ===
On 27 June 1946 she headed north to Seattle and inactivation, arriving there on the 30th. She completed inactivation overhaul and was placed out of commission at Seattle and transferred to the Maritime Commission on 12 August 1946 for disposal and simultaneously was placed under bareboat charter to the Army. Her name was struck from the Navy List on 28 August 1946. Winged Arrow earned four battle stars during World War II.

A little after two months charter to the Army the ship was placed in the Reserve Fleet at Suisun Bay, California on 23 October 1946. The ship remained there until sold and withdrawn on 6 February 1948 by the purchaser, Waterman Steamship Corporation.

== Commercial service ==
Between 1948 and 1965, she served several steamship companies under the names Susan, Noordzee, Fairhope, and finally Green Bay. Her name disappeared from mercantile lists late in 1965. Presumably she was broken up.
