= USS LST-476 =

1942 LST-1-class tank landing ship

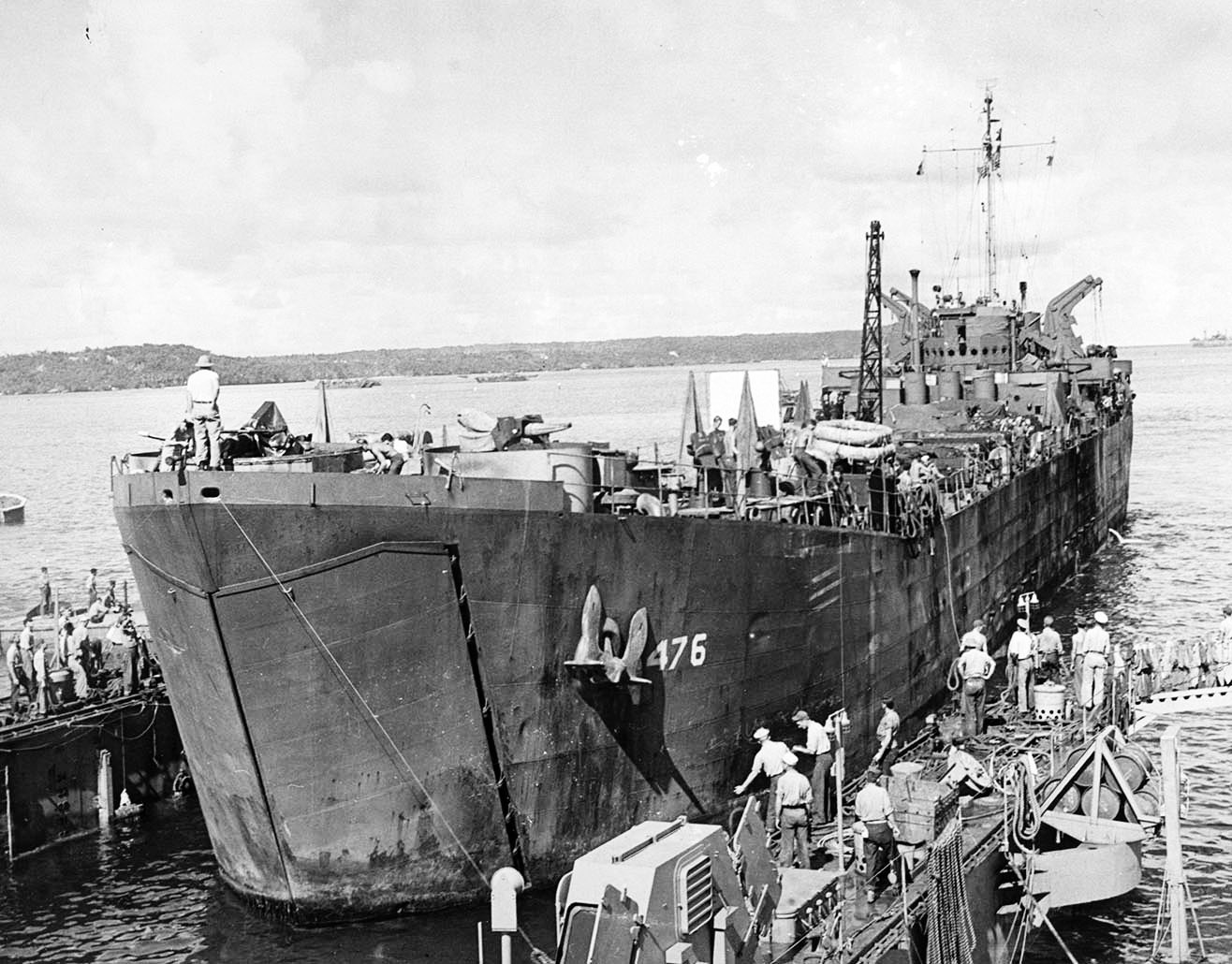
- USS LST-476, in a floating dry dock, c. 1945, location unknown. Note the movie screen on the starboard side of the main deck.

History

United States
- Name: LST-476
- Ordered: as a Type S3-M-K2 hull, MCE hull 996
- Builder: Permanente Metals Corporation, Yard No. 4, Richmond, California
- Cost: $1,711,380.19
- Yard number: 31
- Way number: 1
- Laid down: 5 August 1942
- Launched: 10 October 1942
- Sponsored by: Mrs. D.T. Williams
- Commissioned: 4 April 1943
- Decommissioned: 12 February 1946
- Identification: Hull symbol: LST-476; Code letters: NGKX
- Honors and awards: 5 × battle stars
- Fate: assigned to Commander Naval Forces Far East

Japan
- Name: Q053
- Operator: Shipping Control Authority for Japan
- In service: 12 February 1946
- Out of service: date unknown
- Stricken: 31 October 1947
- Fate: transferred to Maritime Administration (MARAD), 20 April 1948

United States
- Operator: MARAD
- Fate: Sold for scrapping, 1 June 1948

General characteristics
- Class & type: LST-1-class tank landing ship
- Displacement: 4,080 long tons (4,145 t) full load; 2,160 long tons (2,190 t) landing
- Length: 328 ft (100 m) oa
- Beam: 50 ft (15 m)
- Draft: Full load: 8 ft 2 in (2.49 m) forward; 14 ft 1 in (4.29 m) aft; Landing at 2,160 t: 3 ft 11 in (1.19 m) forward; 9 ft 10 in (3.00 m) aft
- Installed power: 2 × 900 hp (670 kW) Electro-Motive Diesel 12-567A diesel engines; 1,700 shp (1,300 kW)
- Propulsion: 1 × Falk main reduction gears; 2 × Propellers
- Speed: 12 kn (22 km/h; 14 mph)
- Range: 24,000 nmi (44,000 km; 28,000 mi) at 9 kn (17 km/h; 10 mph) while displacing 3,960 long tons (4,024 t)
- Boats & landing craft carried: 2 or 6 x LCVPs
- Capacity: 2,100 tons oceangoing maximum; 350 tons main deckload
- Troops: 16 officers, 147 enlisted men
- Complement: 13 officers, 104 enlisted men
- Armament: Varied, ultimate armament; 2 × twin 40 mm (1.57 in) Bofors guns; 4 × single 40 mm Bofors guns; 12 × 20 mm (0.79 in) Oerlikon cannons

Service record
- Part of: LST Flotilla 5
- Operations: Gilbert Islands operations (21 November–8 December 1943); Occupation of Kwajalein and Majuro Atolls (2–8 February 1944); Battle of Hollandia (21–26 April 1944); Capture and occupation of Guam (21 July–15 August 1944); Cape Sansapor operation (4–10 August 1944)
- Awards: American Campaign Medal; Asiatic–Pacific Campaign Medal; World War II Victory Medal; Navy Occupation Service Medal w/Asia Clasp

USS LST-476 was a United States Navy LST-1-class tank landing ship used in the Asiatic-Pacific Theater during World War II.

== Construction ==
LST-476 was laid down on 5 August 1942, under Maritime Commission (MARCOM) contract, MC hull 996, by Kaiser Shipyards, Yard No. 4, Richmond, California; launched on 10 October 1942, sponsored by Mrs. D.T. Williams; and commissioned on 4 April 1943.

== Service history ==
During the war, LST-476 was assigned to the Pacific Theater of Operations. She took part in the Gilbert Islands operation, December 1943; the Occupation of Kwajalein and Majuro Atolls in February 1944; the Battle of Hollandia in April 1944; the Battle of Guam in July and August 1944; and the Battle of Sansapor in August 1944.

== Post-war service ==
Following the war, LST-476 performed occupation duty in the Far East until February 1946. Upon her return to the United States, she was decommissioned on 12 February 1946 and struck from the Navy list on 31 October 1947. On 1 June 1948, the ship was sold to the Puget Sound Bridge & Dredging Company, Seattle, Washington.

== Honors and awards ==
LST-476 earned five battle stars for her World War II service.

== Bibliography ==
- "LST-476". Dictionary of American Naval Fighting Ships. Naval History and Heritage Command. This article incorporates text from this source, which is in the public domain.
- "Kaiser Permanente No. 4, Richmond CA". www.ShipbuildingHistory.com. 5 February 2014.
- "USS LST-476". NavSource. 15 July 2016.
- "MC-996".
