= Marine Corps Air Station Eagle Mountain Lake =

MCAS Eagle Mountain Lake
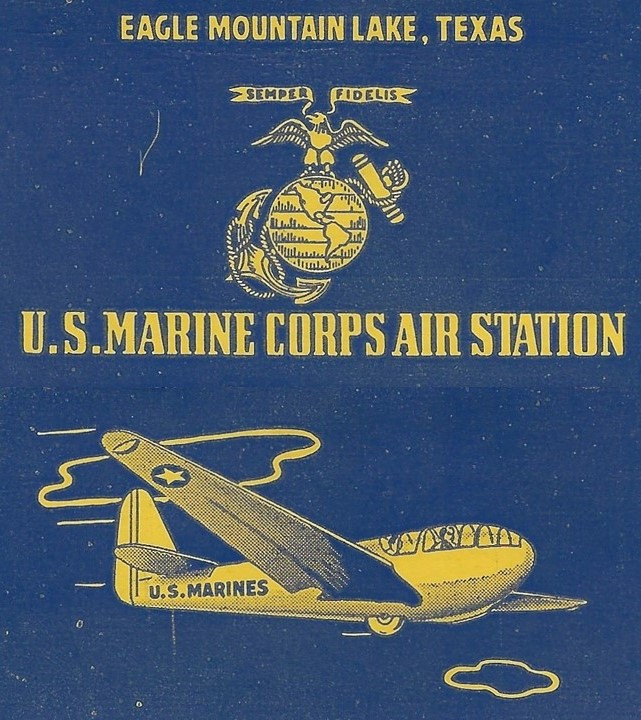
- A 1943 matchbook cover from MCAS Eagle Mountain Lake when the USMC glider program was still active; a Bristol XLRQ is shown
- IATA: none; ICAO: none

Summary
- Airport type: Military
- Operator: USMC
- Location: Pecan Acres, Texas
- Built: 1 December 1942 – December 1946
- In use: 1942–1946
- Coordinates: 32°58′39″N 97°29′32″W

Map
- Location within Texas

Runways
| Direction | Length | | Surface |
| Direction | ft | m | Surface |
|---|---|---|---|
| 17L/35R | 6,000 | 1,829 | Concrete |
| 12L/30R | 3,000 | 914 | Concrete |

Marine Corps Air Station Eagle Mountain Lake (MCAS Eagle Mountain Lake) was a United States Marine Corps (USMC) air station that was located 23 miles (37 km) northwest of Fort Worth, Texas during World War II, next to the lake of the same name. Commissioned on 1 December 1942, the air station was originally home to the Marine Corps military glider program. When the program was cancelled in 1943 the station was used to train USMC dive bomber pilots and later became home to the Marines' night fighter program. After the war the air station went into caretaker status in December 1946, became an outlying landing field of Naval Air Station Dallas, and was later used by the Texas Army National Guard and other branches of the U.S. military before being sold to a private owner in the 1970s. Today, the facility is a private airport run by Kenneth Copeland Ministries as Kenneth Copeland Airport (FAA LID: 4T2).

== History ==
=== World War II ===
In 1942, 2,931 acres (11.9 km^{2}) of former ranch land were purchased on the eastern shore of Eagle Mountain Lake so the Marine Corps could set up glider operations. When it was announced to the public on 23 June 1942, the base was touted as the first of its kind, and was designed to house 500 officers, 1,500 trainees, and 1,000 enlisted troops. It would cost $5,000,000 (equivalent to $93,028,846 in 2025) to build, according to preliminary estimates. Construction of the base began on 24 July 1942. Marine Glider Group 71 (MLG-71) and Marine Glider Squadron 711 (VML-711) under the command of Colonel Vernon M. Guymon arrived at the base in November 1942 and the station was officially commissioned on 1 December 1942. When it was completed, the airfield had three runways and a seaplane launching ramp leading into Eagle Mountain Lake.

In May 1943, the Marine Corps cancelled its glider program and on 30 June 1943, the base was redesignated a Naval Air Station. The Navy's Strategic Tasks Air Group 2 used the airfield to test newly developed remote control aircraft until 1944 when they were moved to Traverse City, Michigan.

On 1 April 1944, the air station reverted to Marine Corps control by the authorization of CNO Dispatch 31TWX1715. The Air Station's next higher echelon command was Commander, Naval Air Bases, Clinton, Oklahoma. On 9 April, Marine Aircraft Group 33 (MAG-33) arrived from Bogue Field, North Carolina. The base was used for advanced training of USMC dive bomber crews before they were deployed to combat. In July 1944, the Fort Worth Star-Telegram reported that the USMC was considering expanding the base to accommodate more dive bomber trainees. MAG-33 stayed until 17 August 1944, when they left for San Diego, California. In August, Marine Aircraft Group 93 (MAG-93) arrived from Marine Corps Air Station Cherry Point and remained until November. In December the field became the home of Marine Aircraft Group 53 which was the Marine Corps' first night fighter group. From then on the base was used primarily for night fighter training. Two common night fighters that operated from the field were the Grumman F6F Hellcat and F7F Tigercat.

28 February 1945 saw the arrival of VMF(N)-544 to MCAS Eagle Mountain Lake and it was also during this time that the air station reached its maximum utilization with a total of 121 aircraft on board.

=== Post World War II use ===
On 28 February 1946 the air station went into caretaker status on the authority of Aviation Planning Directive 27-NN-46. Subsequently, the field became an outlying landing field of Naval Air Station Dallas. By April of that year, it became clear that the U.S. military did not have plans to use the base to its full capacity, and local aviation entrepreneur Reed Pigman and the Fort Worth Chamber of Commerce hatched plans to use vacant parts of the facility as a flying school and "cross-country resort". However, in 1947 the base was instead transferred to the Texas Army National Guard, becoming a headquarters for the 49th Armored Division, and the base hospital was put to use treating polio and cerebral palsy patients from the local area.

In 1959, severely deteriorated buildings at the base were used in a science fiction film entitled Beyond the Time Barrier, in which the protagonist, an Air Force test pilot, travels into the future on a supersonic airplane and returns to find that the air base from which he took off is in ruins. By 1973, maps depicted Eagle Mountain Lake as an abandoned airfield. In the early 1980s, the property was transferred to televangelist Kenneth Copeland, and a new hangar had been built on the site of the original World War II-era structure.

=== Present day ===
Kenneth Copeland Airport
- IATA: none; ICAO: none; FAA LID: 4T2

Summary
- Airport type: Private
- Location: Fort Worth, Texas
- Elevation AMSL: 693 ft (211 m)
- Coordinates: 32°58′39″N 97°29′32″W
- Interactive map of Kenneth Copeland Airport

Runways
| Direction | Length | | Surface |
| Direction | ft | m | Surface |
|---|---|---|---|
| 17/35 | 5,943 | 1,811 | Concrete |

As of October 2024, the facility was in operation as Kenneth Copeland Airport, owned by Kenneth Copeland Ministries, (FAA LID: 4T2). The airfield has one runway:

- Runway 17/35: 5,943 x 125 ft. (1,811 x 38 m), Surface: Concrete

At the time, no aircraft were based at the airport, and it was not open for public use. In September of that year, the Star-Telegram reported that the airfield was being used for helicopter pilot training, and Kenneth Copeland Ministries (KCM) was using the former hospital as a medical clinic for church members. One of the runways had been closed due to surface deterioration; KCM said it was raising funds to repair and reopen it. The seaplane ramp was still extant.

== See also ==
- List of United States Marine Corps installations
- List of active United States Marine Corps aircraft squadrons
- United States Marine Corps Aviation
