= Frank C. Lang =

American Major general

Frank Christian Lang
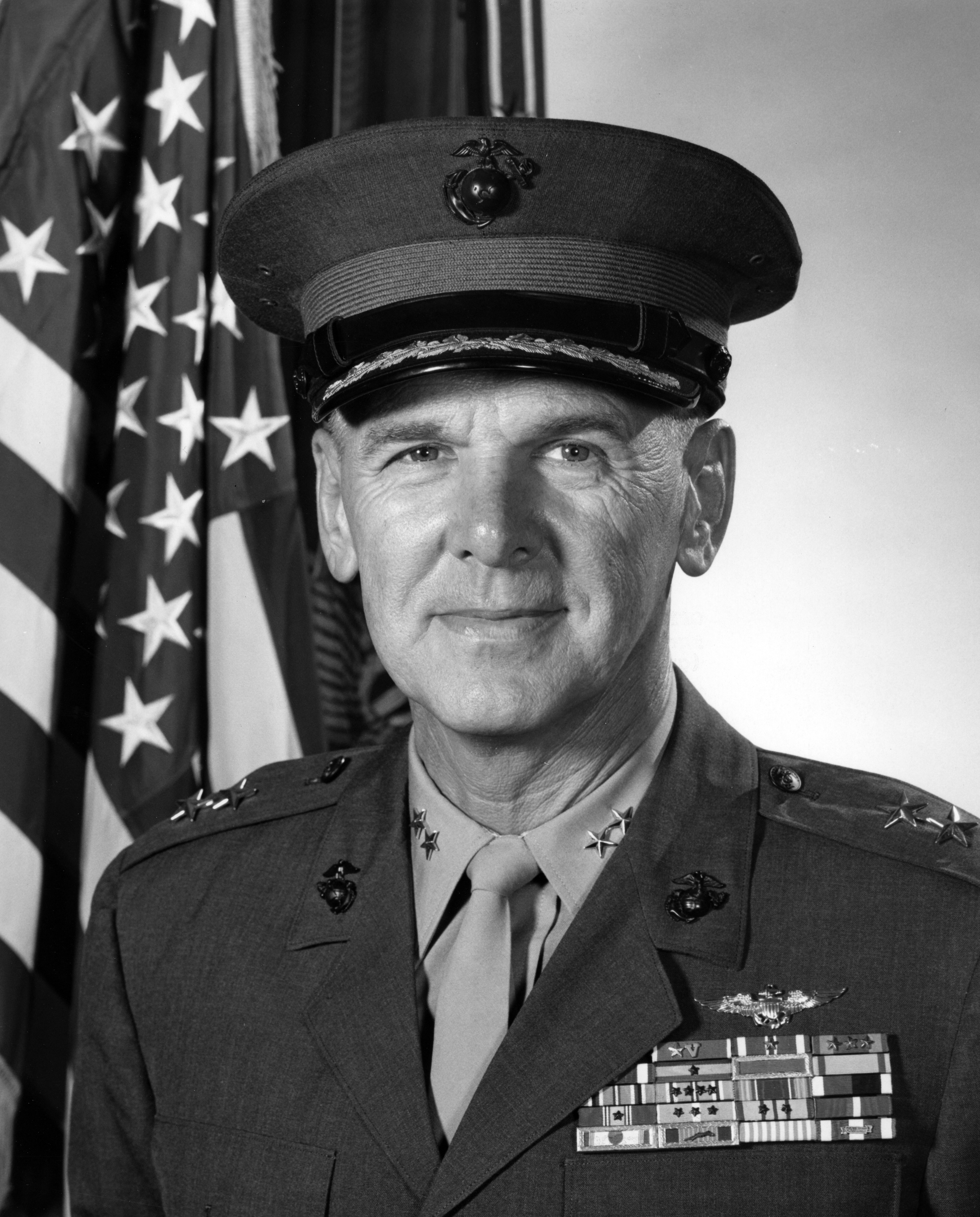
- Lang as Major general, USMC
- Born: September 13, 1918; New Rochelle, New York, US
- Died: December 29, 2008 (aged 90); San Diego, California, US
- Burial place: Fort Rosecrans National Cemetery
- Military career
- Allegiance: United States
- Branch: United States Marine Corps
- Service years: 1942-1978
- Rank: Major general
- Service number: 0-20422
- Commands: 1st Marine Aircraft Wing; 3rd Marine Aircraft Wing; Marine Aircraft Group 26; Medium Helicopter squadron-264
- Conflicts: World War II; Marshall Islands campaign; Mariana Islands campaign; Battle of Okinawa; Battle of Balikpapan; Chinese Civil War; Korean War; Vietnam War
- Awards: Defense Superior Service Medal; Distinguished Flying Cross (2); Legion of Merit (3); Air Medal (16)

Frank Christian Lang (September 13, 1918 – December 29, 2008) was a highly decorated officer in the United States Marine Corps with the rank of major general. A veteran of three wars, Lang began his career as fighter pilot in World War II and rose to the command of Marine Aircraft Group during the Vietnam War. Lang was promoted to the general's rank following the war and held several important assignments including command of 1st and 3rd Marine Aircraft Wings. He completed his career as Deputy Commander, Fleet Marine Force, Pacific in 1978.

== Early career and World War II ==
Frank C. Lang was born on September 13, 1918, in New Rochelle, New York, the son of Christian and Marie Lang. Following the high school, he worked for Vought-Sikorsky as an aircraft and engine mechanic, before entering the New Haven Teachers State College in New Haven, Connecticut.

While at the College, Lang entered the Civilian Pilot Training Program, which he completed and earned his private pilot license. Following the United States entry into World War II, he enlisted the Naval Reserve in 1942 and entered the Naval Aviation Program.

He was ordered to the Naval Air Station Pensacola, Florida, and completed the flight training in March 1943. Lang was subsequently commissioned second lieutenant in the Marine Corps and designated Naval Aviator. He was then ordered to the newly established Marine Night Fighter Squadron 532 (VMF (N)-532; Nightfighters) at Marine Corps Air Station Cherry Point, North Carolina, and after almost 10 months of night training on Vought F4U Corsair, Lang and his squadron were transferred to San Diego, California, in December 1943 in order to deploy to South Pacific and was promoted to first lieutenant during that time.

After a brief stop on Hawaii, VMF (N)-532 was garrisoned on Tarawa, Gilbert Islands, and immediately began flying night combat air patrols. The squadron then moved to Roi-Namur, Marshall Islands in mid-February 1944 and Lang continued in night combat air patrols there for next two months. During the patrols at Engebi, Lang completed several interceptions. However all of his targets turned out to be cleverly designed decoys, which the enemy bombers had ejected over the target.

He later took part in the night combat air patrols over the Mariana Islands, patrolling at Saipan and Guam and was promoted to Captain in August 1944. The VMF (N)-532 returned to the United States in October 1944 and Lang was stationed with his squadron at Marine Corps Air Station Miramar, California, until early 1945, when he was transferred to the Marine Fighting Squadron 511 (VMF-511). For his service with VMF (N)-532, Lang received Distinguished Flying Cross and two Air Medals.

The VMF-511 deployed to South Pacific aboard escort carrier USS Block Island and Lang took part in the air combat operations during the Battle of Okinawa in May–June 1945. His squadron was then ordered to take part in the Battle of Balikpapan in Borneo during July that year. Japan announced surrender one month later and Lang spent next four months in Tokyo Bay and off the coast of Korea during the providing of cover for minesweeping operations. For his service on Okinawa and Borneo, Lang received his second Distinguished Flying Cross and another eight Air Medals.

== Postwar career ==
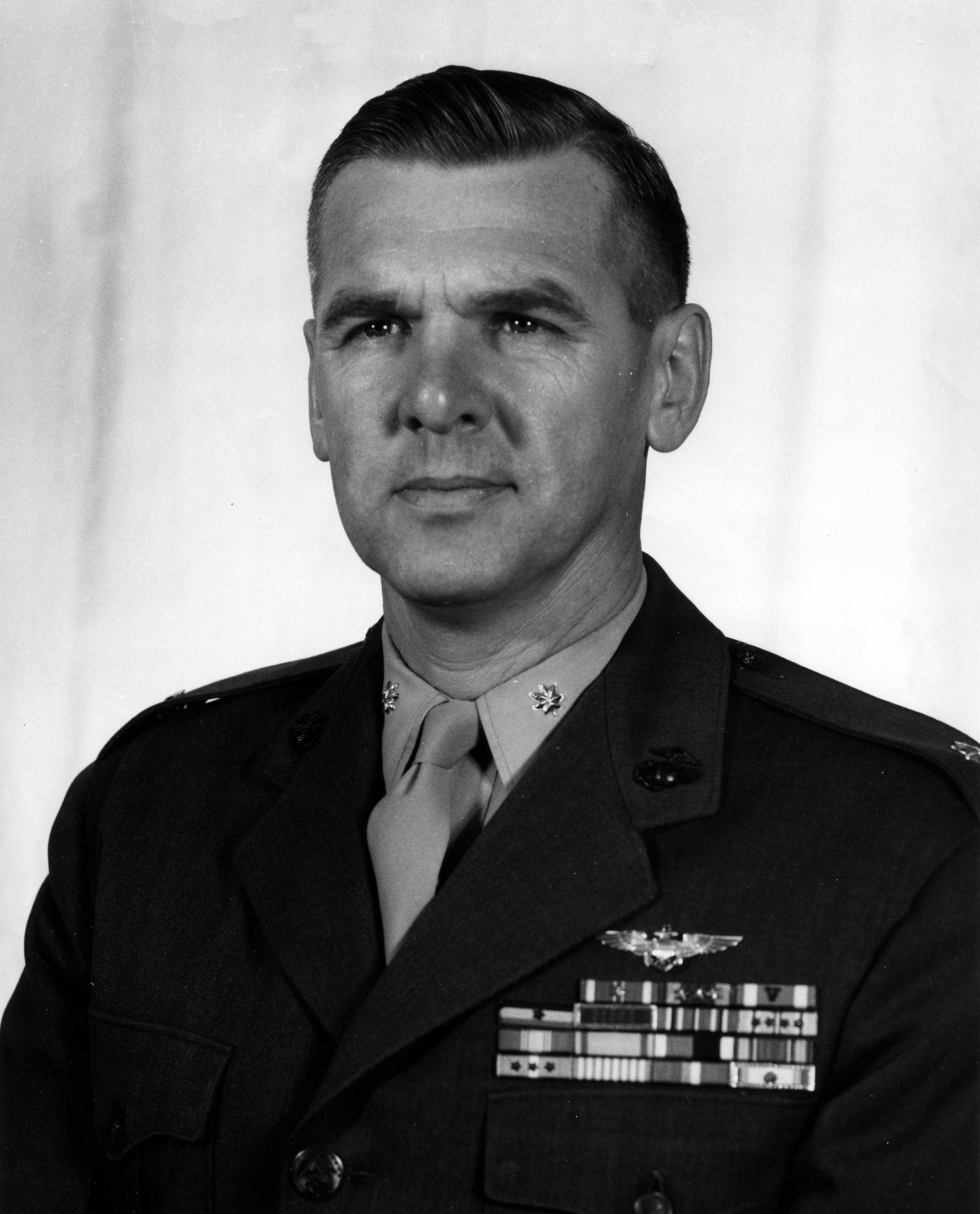
Lang as Lieutenant colonel in June 1965

Following his return stateside in late 1945, Lang was attached to the staff of Marine Aircraft Group 53 and later was transferred to Marine Aircraft Group-31 at Marine Corps Air Station Miramar, California.

In May 1948, Lang was assigned to the headquarters battalion, Fleet Marine Force, Western Pacific under Brigadier General Omar T. Pfeiffer and took part in the combat operations in North China during the Chinese Civil War. He was transferred to the Marine Fighter Squadron 542 in June 1949 and deployed to Korea during the ongoing war in September 1950. Lang took part in the close air support, air interdiction and reconnaissance flights against enemy on twin-engine, radar-upgraded Grumman F7F Tigercat and returned to the United States in March 1951. For his service in Korea, he was decorated with Navy Commendation Medal with Combat "V" and another six Air Medals.

Lang was subsequently assigned to the headquarters Air, Fleet Marine Force, Pacific at Marine Corps Air Station El Toro, California, and remained there until June 1952. He was promoted to Major and ordered to the Air Command and Staff College at Maxwell Air Force Base, Alabama, for an instruction.

Upon the graduation, Lang was ordered to the Navy Aviation Supply Office in Philadelphia, where he served as Aviation Planning Officer before he was assigned to the Marine All-Weather Fighter Squadron 513 operating out of NAS Atsugi, Japan. He served first as an Executive officer and then assumed command of the whole squadron.

In January 1958, Lang returned to the United States and joined the staff of Marine Training Group 20 at Marine Corps Air Station Cherry Point, North Carolina, as Assistant Chief of Staff for Operations. He was promoted to Lieutenant Colonel in January 1961 and assumed duty as an Executive officer of Marine Training Squadron 1 also located at Cherry Point. Lang was later ordered to the Amphibious Warfare School in Quantico, Virginia, and graduated from the Senior Course there.

Lang was subsequently ordered to Paris, France, where he joined the headquarters of Commanding General, United States Army Europe as Operations Staff Officer under General Bruce C. Clarke. He spent three years in this capacity and returned to the United States for helicopter transition training at Marine Corps Air Station New River, North Carolina.

Upon the completion of the training, Lang assumed command of Marine Medium Helicopter squadron-264, equipped with H-34 Choctaw helicopters. He held command until December 1964, when he was transferred to Marine Aircraft Group 26 as Executive officer. Following the promotion to colonel in August 1965, he assumed command of that Aircraft Group.

== Vietnam War ==
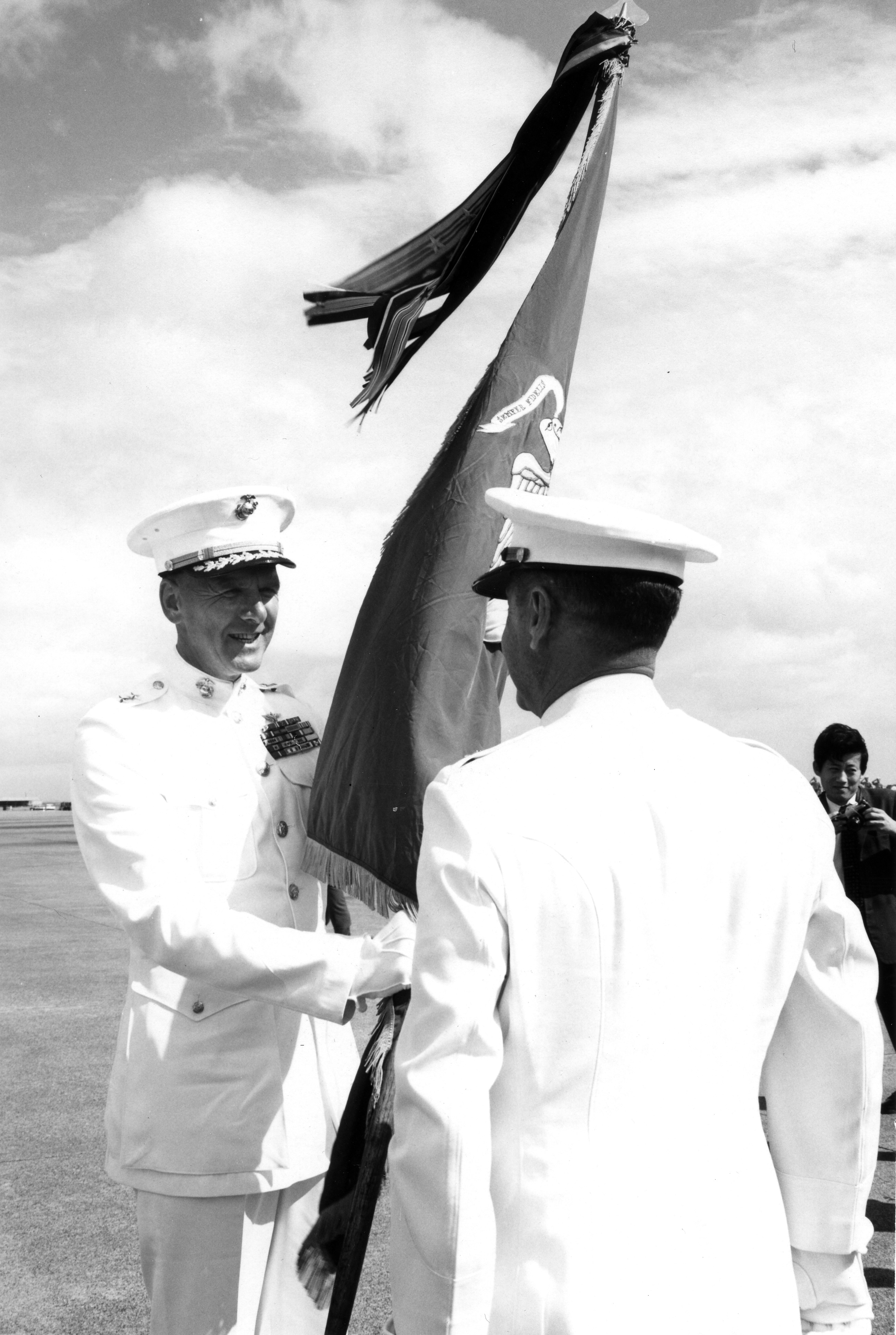
Lang (left), accepts the 1st Marine Aircraft Wing colors from Maj. Gen. Leslie E. Brown during a change of command ceremony at the MCAS Iwakuni, Japan on April 17, 1973.

During the early months of the Vietnam War, Lang commanded his aircraft group at New River Air Station and was tasked with the training of replacements crews. In August 1966, he received orders for deployment for Southeast Asia and joined the headquarters of 1st Marine Division at Chu Lai Base Area in South Vietnam. Lang assumed duty as Division Air Officer and served consecutively under Major generals Lewis J. Fields and Herman Nickerson. His main responsibility was to maintain liaison with 1st Marine Aircraft Wing and assisting in coordinating air strikes, providing transports, supplying with air drops etc. He completed his tour of duty in July 1967 and received Legion of Merit with Combat "V" for his service.

Following his return stateside, Lang entered the Naval War College in Newport, Rhode Island, and completed senior course one year later. He subsequently joined the staff of Deputy Chief Of Staff for manpower under his old superior from Vietnam, now Lieutenant general Herman Nickerson and was co-responsible for all manpower matters for regular, reserve, both active and inactive, and civilian personnel, as well as the individual training and education of military personnel during the later stage of Vietnam War.

Lang served in this capacity until October 1969, when he was selected for the rank of brigadier general and assumed duty as Deputy Assistant Director, Plans, Programs and Systems within the Defense Supply Agency. He served in this capacity until September 1971 and received his second Legion of Merit.

== Later career ==
Lang was then ordered to Marine Corps Air Station El Toro, California, and assumed command of 3rd Marine Aircraft Wing with headquarters there. His main duty was to maintain combat readiness during the withdrawal of Marine troops from Vietnam and he held this command until August 1972, when he was promoted to the capacity of Commander, Marine Corps Air Bases, Western Area at El Toro Air Station.

Following the promotion to major general in April 1973, Lang was ordered to Japan and assumed command of 1st Marine Aircraft Wing at Iwakuni Air Base. While in this capacity, he supervised the withdrawal of 1st Marine Aircraft Wing from South Vietnam according to the terms of the Paris Peace Accords.

In May 1974, Lang was transferred to Hawaii, where he assumed duty as Director of Operations (J-3), United States Pacific Command under Admiral Noel Gayler. In this Unified combatant command, he was responsible for the planning and execution of operations of Fleet Marine Force, Pacific, United States Pacific Fleet, Pacific Air Forces, and others. Lang remained in that capacity until March 1977, when he was appointed Deputy Commander, Fleet Marine Force, Pacific under Lieutenant General Leslie E. Brown.

General Lang retired from active duty on July 1, 1978, after 36 years of commissioned service and received Defense Superior Service Medal and third Legion of Merit for his services with U.S. Pacific Command and Fleet Marine Force, Pacific. He also received the Gray Eagle Award, which is presented to the Naval Aviator on continuous active duty in U.S. Navy or Marine Corps who has held that designation for the longest period of time.

== Retirement ==
Following his retirement from the Marine Corps, Lang settled in San Diego, California, and was active in several sports including golf, scuba diving, and skiing during the winter season in Mammoth Mountain Ski Area. He was also a member of several veteran organizations including the Early and Pioneer Aviators Association (aka The Golden Eagles), Flying Leatherneck Historical Foundation, Marine Corps Aviation Association, Marine Corps Association, Marine Corps Historical Foundation, Association of Naval Aviation, Military Order of the World Wars, Naval Aviation Museum Foundation, the Tailhook Association, and others. He was also active in the Marine Corps Oral History Program and received a Certificate of Appreciation from the Commandant of the Marine Corps, Paul X. Kelley in June 1986.

Major general Frank C. Lang died on December 29, 2008, aged 90, at his home in San Diego and was buried with full military honors at Fort Rosecrans National Cemetery, California.

== Awards and decorations ==
Major general Lang's personal decorations include:

Naval Aviator Badge
1st Row	Defense Superior Service Medal	Distinguished Flying Cross with one 5/16" Gold Star	Legion of Merit with three 5/16" Gold Stars and Combat "V"	Air Medal with two silver and one gold 5/16"Stars
2nd Row	Navy and Marine Corps Commendation Medal with Combat "V"	Navy Presidential Unit Citation with one star	Army Presidential Unit Citation	American Campaign Medal
3rd Row	Asiatic-Pacific Campaign Medal with four 3/16 inch service stars	World War II Victory Medal	Navy Occupation Service Medal	China Service Medal
4th Row	National Defense Service Medal with one service star	Korean Service Medal with three 3/16 inch service stars	Vietnam Service Medal with two 3/16 inch service stars	Philippine Liberation Medal
5th Row	Korean Presidential Unit Citation	Vietnam Gallantry Cross unit citation	United Nations Korea Medal	Vietnam Campaign Medal

== See also ==
- Gray Eagle Award
- Tailhook Association

Military offices
Preceded by Leslie E. Brown	Commanding General, 1st Marine Aircraft Wing; April 1973 - May 1974	Succeeded by Victor A. Armstrong
Preceded by Leslie E. Brown	Commanding General, 3rd Marine Aircraft Wing; September 1971 - August 1972	Succeeded by Albert C. Pommerenk
