= Earl Hanson =

Earl Hanson may refer to:

- Earl W. Hanson (1888–1950), American banker and member of the Wisconsin State Assembly
- Earl Dorchester Hanson (died 1993), American professor of biology
