= Harold L. Spears =

American combat pilot

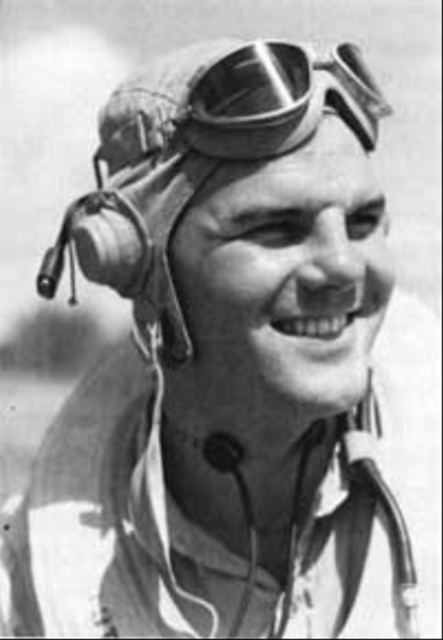
- Capt. Harold L. Spears
- Born: December 31, 1919; Ironton, Ohio
- Died: December 6, 1944 (aged 24); Laguna Beach, California
- Burial place: Woodland Cemetery, Ironton, Ohio
- Military career
- Allegiance: United States
- Branch: United States Marine Corps
- Service years: 1941–1944
- Rank: Captain
- Service number: 0-12841
- Unit: VMF-215

Harold Leman Spears (December 31, 1919 – December 6, 1944) was an American combat pilot who was a United States Marine Corps fighter ace during World War II.

Spears died in December 1944 when the Douglas SBD Dauntless he was flying on crashed.

== See also ==
- Robert M. Hanson
- Donald N. Aldrich
