= VMF-215 =

Marine Fighting Squadron 215
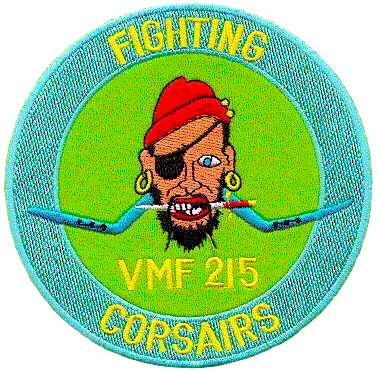
- VMF-215’s Insignia
- Active: 1 Mar 1942 – 6 Nov 1944; 21 Nov 1944 – 13 Nov 1945; 1 Jul 1946 – 30 Jan 1970
- Country: United States
- Branch: USMC
- Type: Fighter squadron
- Role: Air interdiction Close air support
- Part of: Inactive
- Nickname: "Fighting Corsairs"
- Engagements: World War II * Battle of Empress Augusta Bay

Aircraft flown
- Bomber: SBD Dauntless
- Fighter: F4F Wildcat; F4U Corsair; F6F Hellcat

Marine Fighting Squadron 215 (VMF-215) was a fighter squadron of the United States Marine Corps that was commissioned and fought during World War II. Known as "The Fighting Corsairs", the squadron fought in many areas of the Pacific War, including the Battle of Bougainville. During its four-and-a-half month tour, the squadron was credited with shooting down 137 enemy aircraft, fourth most in Marine Corps aviation history.

Following the surrender of Japan, the squadron was decommissioned on 13 November 1946. The squadron was reactivated in the Marine Forces Reserve and based out of Naval Air Station Olathe, Kansas until being decommissioned again on 30 January 1970.

== History ==
=== World War II ===
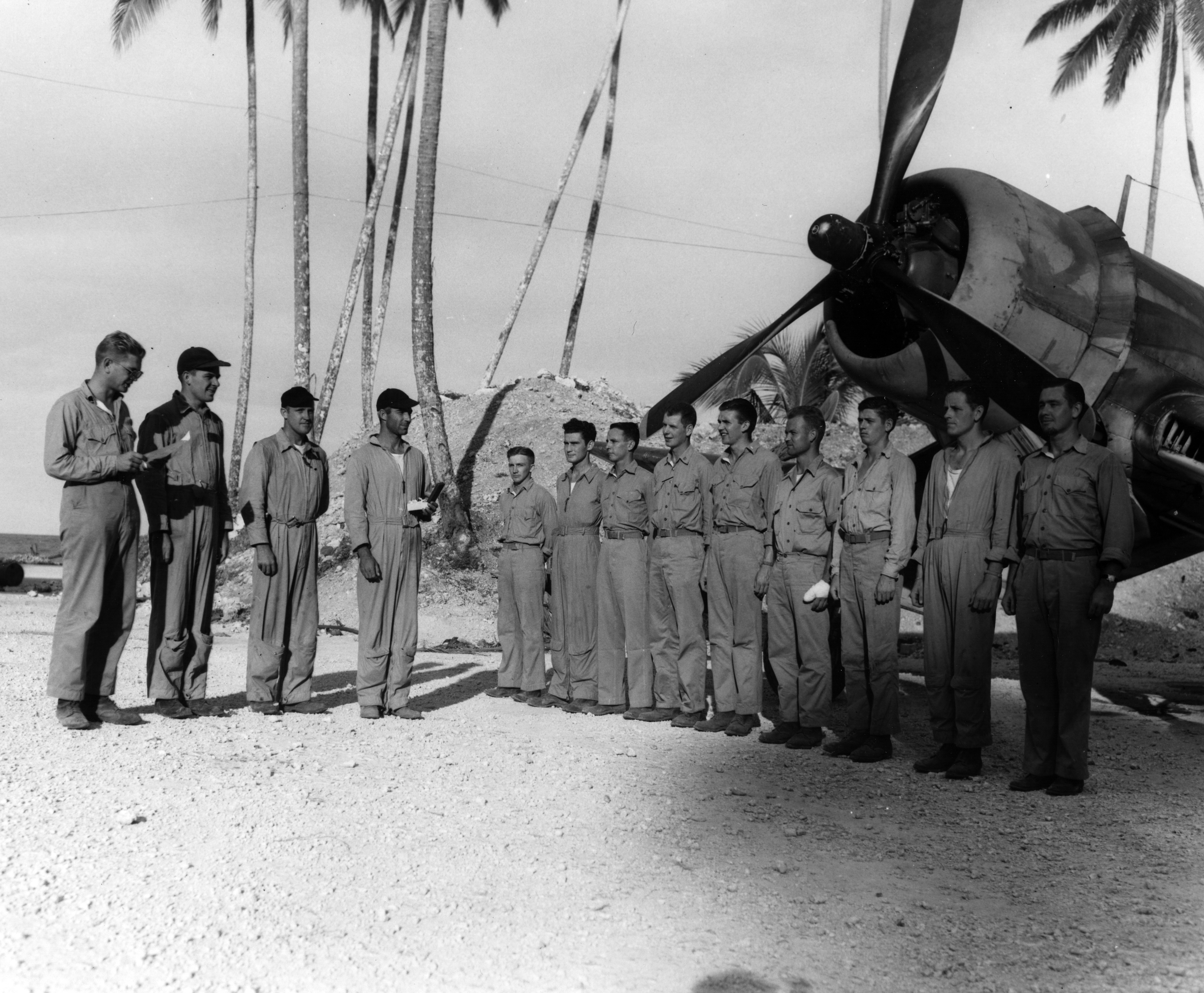
The award ceremony of members of VMF-215 at Vella Lavella Island in November 1943. Commanding officer and Marine Corps flying ace, Robert G. Owens Jr. is second from left.

The squadron was commissioned on 1 March 1942, as Marine Scout Bomber Squadron 244 (VMSB-244). On 14 September of that same year they were re-designated Marine Scout Bomber Squadron 242 (VMSB-242) only to be changed again the next day to its final name, Marine Fighting Squadron 215. The squadron trained at Marine Corps Air Station Santa Barbara, California prior to deploying and during this time transitioned from the SBD Dauntless dive bomber to the F4F Wildcat.

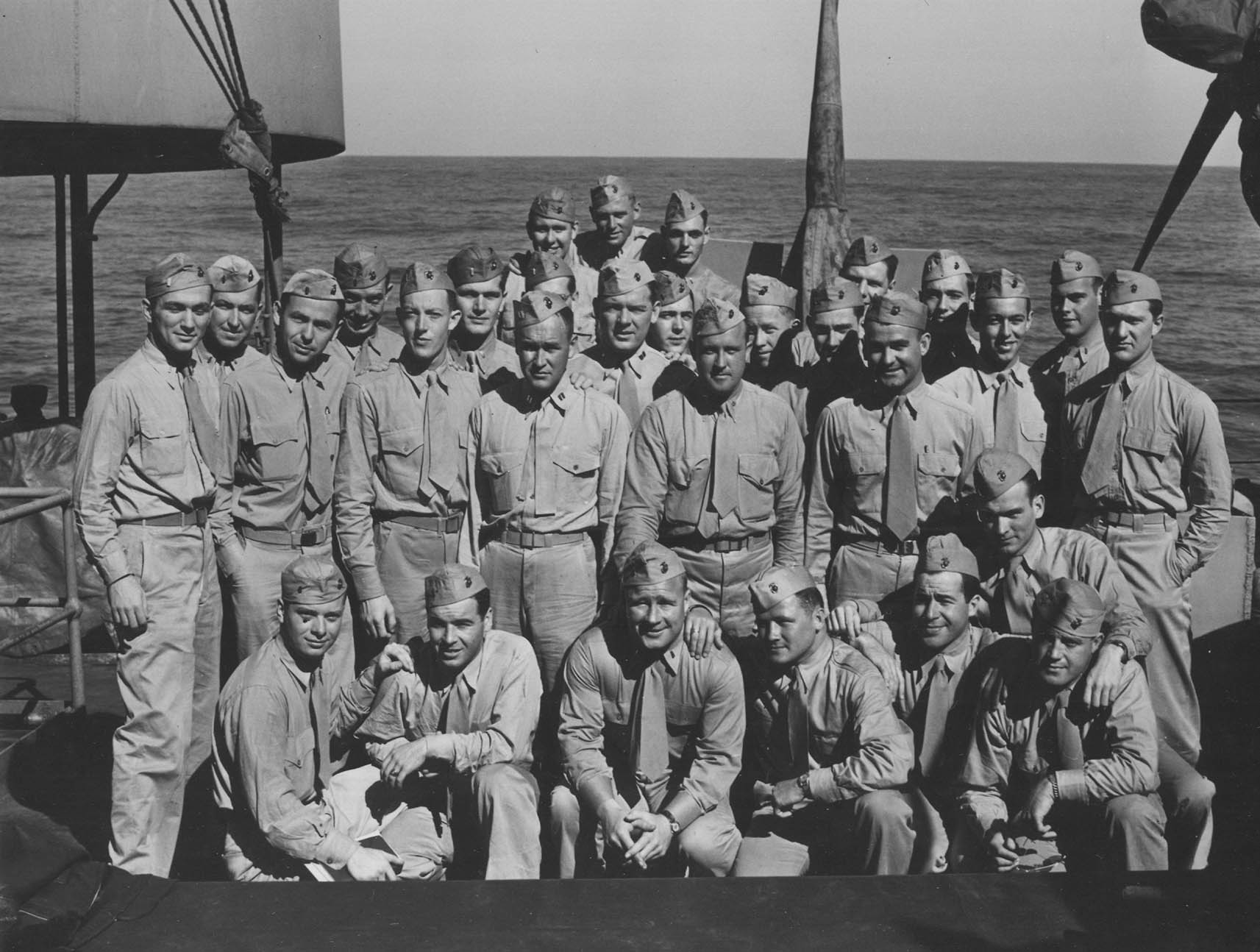
The Original pilots of VMF-215 aboard AV-9 Pocomoke as she carries them between San Diego and Pearl Harbor, February 1943.US Navy Photo 80-G-38595

The squadron departed the United States on 23 February 1943, and was first sent to Marine Corps Air Station Ewa, Hawaii. During their time at MCAS Ewa they again transitioned aircraft, this time receiving the F4U Corsair. The squadron departed Hawaii on 12 May for Midway Atoll where they stayed for two months flying combat air patrols and escorting Allied shipping in the area. In mid-June 1943 they left Midway for the South Pacific.

VMF-215 arrived on Espiritu Santo on 1 July 1943, and by the end of the month was taking part in fighter sweeps against Japanese bases in the northern Solomon Islands. On 14 August, an F4U Corsair from VMF-215 was the first plane to arrive at the newly captured Munda airfield where they immediately began operating to cover the landings on Vella Lavella. Shortly thereafter the squadron pulled back to the rear for rest and relaxation.

The squadron’s second combat tour began while they were based at Barakoma Airfield on Vella Lavella. From there they covered the landings at Empress Augusta Bay on Bougainville, which began on 1 November 1943. By 27 January 1944 the squadron was operating from Torokina Airfield on Bougainville and from there the squadron took part in air strikes against the Japanese garrison at Rabaul, the Japanese naval base at Kavieng, New Ireland and against Japanese shipping near the Bismarck Archipelago. During this time VMF-215 established four new Marine records in the South Pacific by downing 137 Japanese planes in 18 weeks, 87 planes shot down in one month, 106 planes destroyed in a single 6-week tour and 10 aces in one squadron.

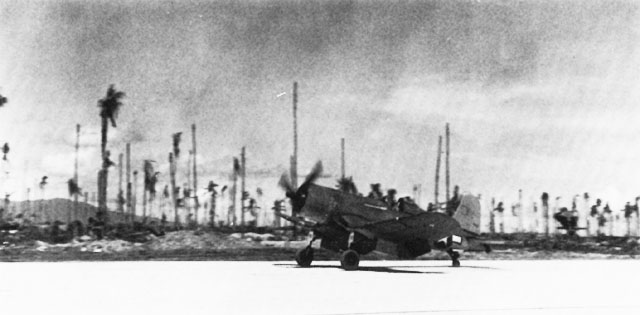
The first fighter plane to land on Munda was a VMF-215 Corsair flown by Maj Robert G. Owens, Jr., on 14 August 1943.

As action in the Solomons drew to a close the squadron was sent to Turtle Bay Airfield where it was not deactivated but existed only on paper for a few weeks. They were reformed on 7 May 1944, and were sent to Emirau on 5 August 1944. From there they moved to Guadalcanal on their way back to the United States where they eventually arrived on 20 October 1944. Upon arrival at Marine Corps Air Station El Toro, California, the unit was decommissioned on 6 November; however, they were reactivated again on 21 November and became a carrier training replacement unit. Following the end of World War II, the squadron was decommissioned on 13 November 1945.

=== Reserve years ===
VMF-215 was reactivated as squadron in the Marine Forces Reserve on 1 July 1946 at Naval Air Station Olathe in Kansas. The squadron flew the F9F-6 Cougar and later the F9F-8/8Bs. In 1962 it transitioned to the Douglas F4D Skyray. In April 1965, VMF-215 transitioned for the last time to the F-8A Crusader. The squadron was never recalled to active duty and was decommissioned for the last time on 30 January 1970.

== Notable former members ==
- Robert M. Hanson – 25 kills and Medal of Honor recipient
- Donald N. Aldrich – 20 kills
- Harold L. Spears – 15 kills
- Robert G. Owens Jr. – 7 kills, 5 probables
- A. Roger Conant – 6 kills, 3 probables
- Harold A. "Hap" Langstaff Jr. – 3 kills

== Unit awards ==
A unit citation or commendation is an award bestowed upon an organization for the action cited. Members of the unit who participated in said actions are allowed to wear on their uniforms the awarded unit citation. VMF-215 was presented with the following awards:

| Ribbon | Unit Award |
|---|---|
| | Navy Unit Commendation |
| | Asiatic-Pacific Campaign Medal |
| | World War II Victory Medal |
| | National Defense Service Medal with one Bronze Star |

== See also ==
- United States Marine Corps Aviation
- List of active United States Marine Corps aircraft squadrons
- List of decommissioned United States Marine Corps aircraft squadrons
