= Edith Hanson =

American television personality

- Born: 28 August 1939
- Occupation(s): television personality, essayist

Edith Hanson (born August 28, 1939) is an American television personality and essayist, living in Tanabe, Wakayama, Japan. She is the younger sister of World War II flying ace Robert M. Hanson and biologist and Marine Earl Dorchester Hanson.

== Biography ==
Born to Methodist Missionaries in Northern India, Hanson moved to Japan in 1960 and worked as an actress and TV personality. From 1986 to 1999, she was the director of Amnesty International Japan and has been the Director of Efa Japan (Empowerment for All) since October 2004. She currently resides in Wakayama, Japan.
