= Leslie E. Brown =

United States Marine Corps general

Leslie Eugene Brown
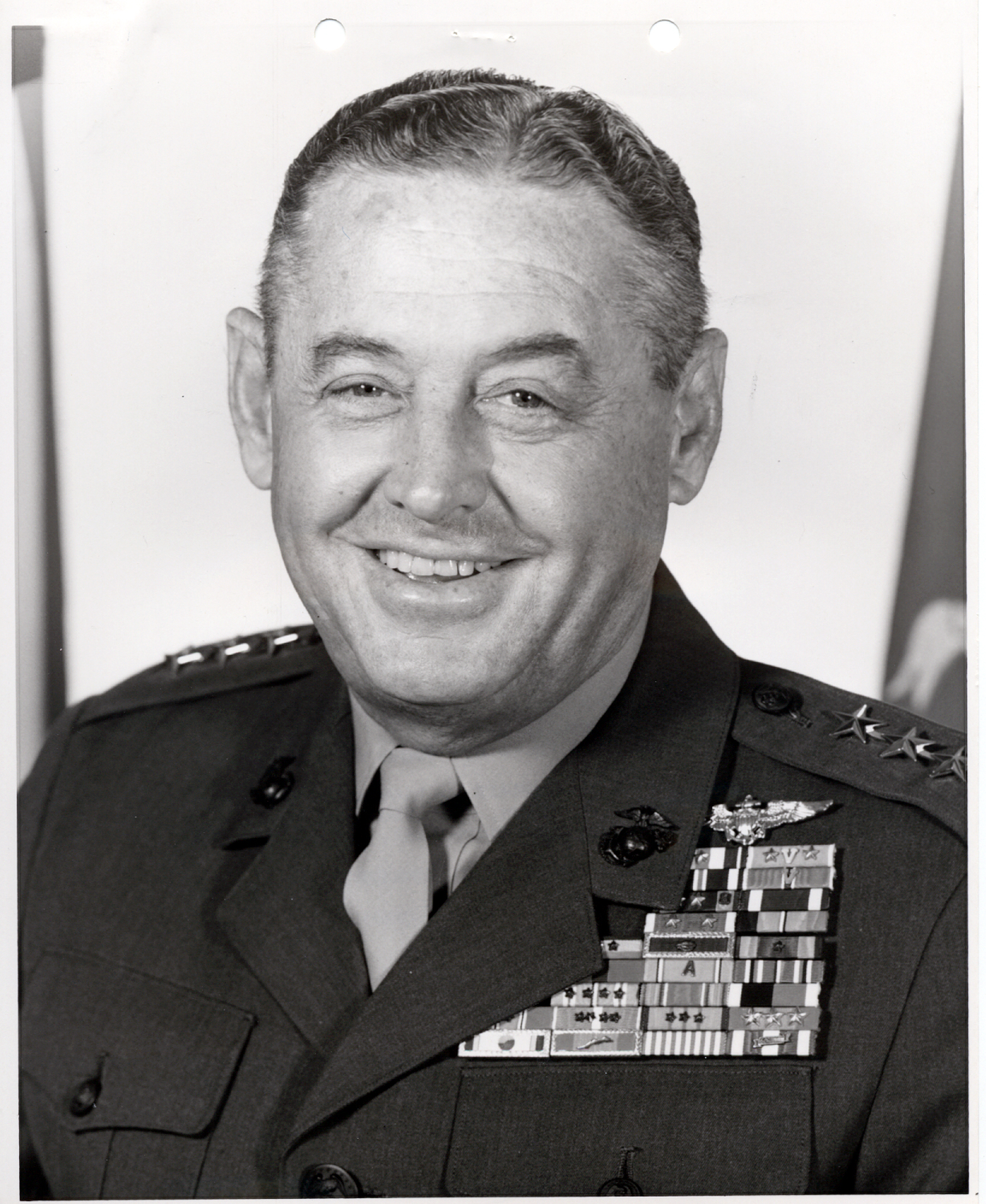
- LtGen Leslie E. Brown, USMC
- Born: July 7, 1920; Toppenish, Washington, U.S.
- Died: September 12, 1997 (aged 77); Palm Springs, California, U.S.
- Burial place: near Palm Springs, California
- Military career
- Allegiance: United States of America
- Branch: United States Marine Corps
- Service years: 1940–1978
- Rank: Lieutenant general
- Nickname: "Les"
- Service number: 0-19930
- Commands: Fleet Marine Force, Pacific; Chief of Staff, HQMC; MAG-12; 3rd Marine Aircraft Wing; 1st Marine Aircraft Wing
- Conflicts: World War II; Battle of Tarawa; Battle of Saipan; Battle of Tinian; Battle of Okinawa; Korean War; Vietnam War
- Awards: Distinguished Service Medal; Silver Star (2); Legion of Merit (3); Distinguished Flying Cross; Bronze Star; Purple Heart; Air Medal (8)

Lieutenant General Leslie Eugene Brown (7 July 1920 – 12 September 1997) was a United States Marine Corps aviator who served in combat in World War II, the Korean War and the Vietnam War. As a combat pilot, he achieved many aviation "firsts". He retired from the Marine Corps in 1978 after 38 years of active duty service.

== Biography ==
Leslie Brown was born on 7 July 1920 in Toppenish, Washington. He graduated from high school in 1938 together with his buddy and future marine general, Jay W. Hubbard and attended Compton College in California prior to enlisting in the U.S. Marine Corps in 1940. He was subsequently attached to the Marine detachment aboard the USS Mississippi and spent next three years with sea duties. Brown reached the NCO's rank and was transferred to 2nd Marine Regiment at New Zealand. Brown subsequently received Field promotion to the rank of second lieutenant in June 1943 and was attached as platoon leader to the Weapons Company of 6th Marine Regiment under Colonel Maurice G. Holmes. His regiment then took part within 2nd Marine Division in the Amphibious Assault on Tarawa Atoll in the Gilbert Islands at the end of November 1943 and Brown quickly reached the rank of first lieutenant.

He led his platoon during the Battle of Saipan in June 1944 and distinguished himself during the landing on June 16, 1944. The landing craft in which he was embarked was his by enemy shells and set on fire. Lieutenant Brown ordered the craft abandoned after the unsuccessful effort to beat the flames and all of his men jumped to the water. During his way to the beach, Brown noticed one wounded soldier entangled by ropes and, despite imminent danger from exploding ammunition in the burning craft, he returned to the landing craft to throw the wounded man into the water. He subsequently provided him his own life belt and towed him to safety shortly before the craft exploded. For this act of valor under fire, Brown was decorated with the Silver Star.

Brown later participated in the battles at Tinian and Okinawa and returned stateside in September 1945. He subsequently served as an instructor at Marine Corps Schools Quantico, Virginia, before he was transferred to Headquarters Marine Corps in Washington, D.C., in October 1945. While at Marine Headquarters, Brown was attached to the Discipline Division as a legal officer. He was transferred to the Judge Advocate General Office, U.S. Navy in December 1945 and served as General Court Martial Review Officer.

In April 1946, Brown applied for flight training and was attached to the Naval Air Station Dallas, Texas. He later continued in his training at Naval Air Station Corpus Christi and Naval Air Station Pensacola, Florida, before he was designated a Naval Aviator in August 1947. His first aviation duty was at Marine Corps Air Station El Toro, California, where he was attached for brief period to VMF-224 and later to the famous VMA-214.

He later qualified in most types of jets, transports and helicopters that the Marine Corps had in use. While in Korea in 1950, he was the first Marine to fly a jet in combat. In Vietnam, he was the First Wing Operations Officer (G-3), and then commanded a jet attack group (MAG-12) at Chu Lai Air Base, earning many aviation "firsts".

In 1962, he attended Oklahoma State University, where he earned both a Bachelor of Science and a and Bachelor of Arts degree, and also completed graduate studies in Human Resources Management.

He held numerous staff assignments including duty as secretary to the general staff and as a Joint Chiefs of Staff project officer at Headquarters Marine Corps; logistics operations officer for the Fleet Marine Force, Pacific; deputy J-3 (Operations) for the United States European Command; chief of staff, Headquarters Marine Corps; and his final assignment as commanding general of Fleet Marine Force, Pacific.

Brown retired from the Marine Corps on 1 October 1978. He died near Palm Springs, California, on 12 September 1997.

== Awards and decorations ==
LtGen. Brown's personal decorations include:

Naval Aviator Badge
1st Row	Navy Distinguished Service Medal		Silver Star with one 5/16" Gold Star	
2nd Row	Legion of Merit with two 5/16" Gold Stars and Combat "V"	Distinguished Flying Cross	Bronze Star with Combat "V"	Purple Heart with two 5/16" Gold Stars
3rd Row	Air Medal with two 5/16" Gold Stars, & Strike/Flight numeral "8"	Navy and Marine Corps Commendation Medal	Combat Action Ribbon	Navy Presidential Unit Citation with two stars
4th Row	Army Presidential Unit Citation with one Oak leaf cluster	Navy Unit Commendation with one star	Marine Corps Good Conduct Medal	American Defense Service Medal with A Device
5th Row	American Campaign Medal	Asiatic-Pacific Campaign Medal with four 3/16 inch silver service stars	World War II Victory Medal	Navy Occupation Service Medal
6th Row	National Defense Service Medal with one service star	Korean Service Medal with four 3/16 inch silver service stars	Vietnam Service Medal with three 3/16 inch silver service stars	Vietnam Gallantry Cross with three gold stars
7th Row	Korean Presidential Unit Citation	Vietnam Gallantry Cross unit citation	United Nations Korea Medal	Vietnam Campaign Medal

Additionally, he was awarded the Veterans of Foreign Wars's highest award, the Grand Cross of Malta; and the Reserve Officer Association Meritorious Service Medal. In January 1975, he was awarded an honorary Doctor of Laws degree.

== Quotes ==
Wherever you are or whatever your job, don't be confused or diverted by false priorities. We have only one mission to perform—that is to fight and win. And, we must do it better than anyone else in the world.

—LtGen Leslie E. Brown

Military offices
Preceded by John N. McLaughlin	Chief of Staff, Headquarters Marine Corps; July 30, 1975 - May 20, 1977	Succeeded by Lawrence F. Snowden
Preceded by Robert G. Owens Jr.	Commanding General of the 1st Marine Aircraft Wing; April 1, 1972 - April 1, 1973	Succeeded by Frank C. Lang
