= Robert G. Owens Jr. =

US Marine Corps general

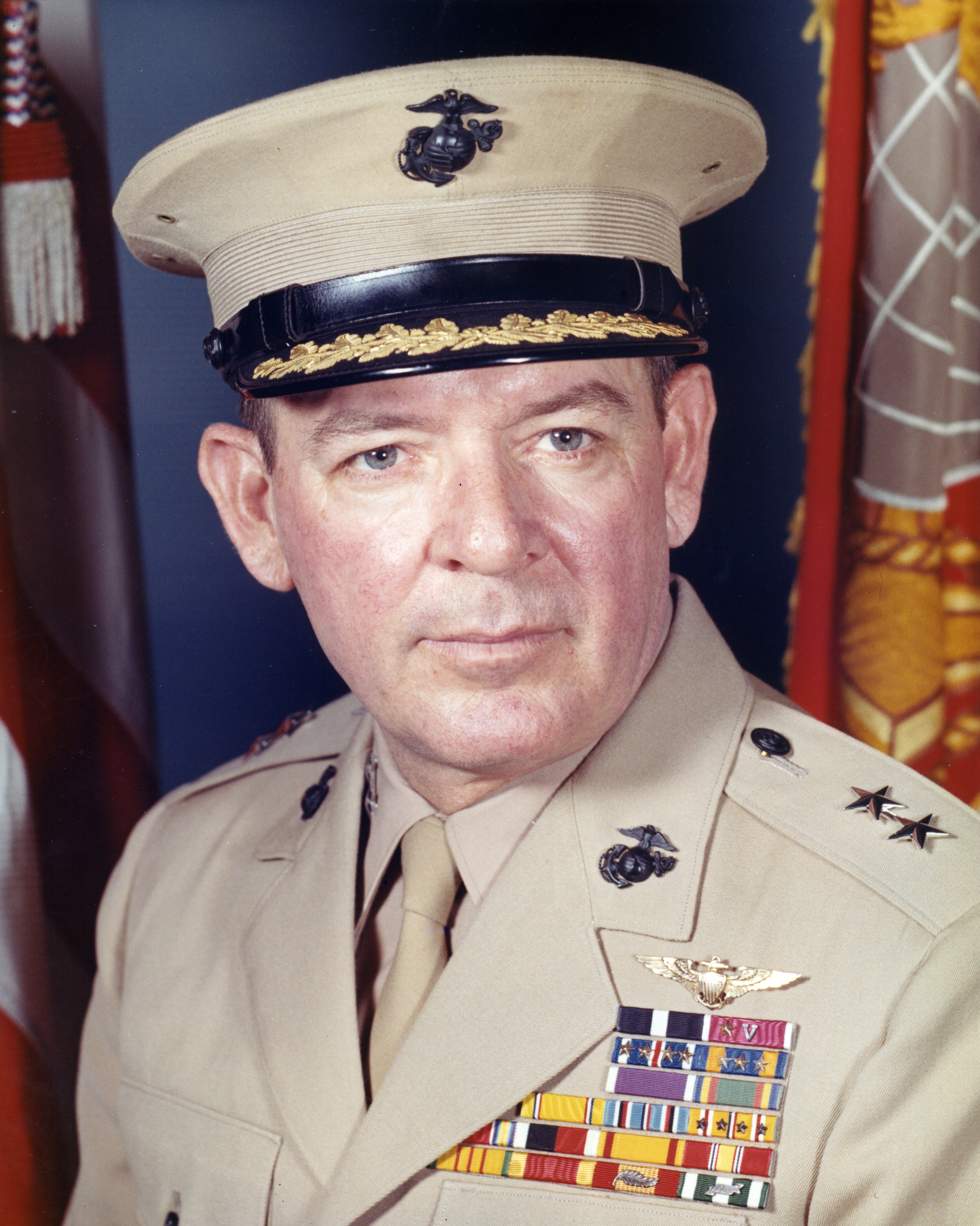
- Robert G. Owens Jr.
- Nickname: "Big O"
- Born: February 13, 1917; Greenville, South Carolina, US
- Died: October 31, 2007 (aged 90) Boulder, Colorado, US
- Buried: Arlington National Cemetery
- Allegiance: United States
- Branch: United States Marine Corps
- Service years: 1939–1972
- Rank: Major General
- Commands: 1st Marine Aircraft Wing; 3rd Marine Aircraft Wing; Marine Fighting Squadron 215
- Conflicts: World War II: Attack on Pearl Harbor; Solomon Islands campaign; Bougainville campaign; Neutralisation of Rabaul; Vietnam War
- Awards: Navy Cross; Legion of Merit (5); Distinguished Flying Cross (5); Air Medal (11); Purple Heart

Robert Gordon Owens Jr. (February 13, 1917 – October 31, 2007) was a highly decorated United States Marine aviator and Major General, who was a flying ace with seven victories during World War II. He was a recipient of the Navy Cross, the United States' second-highest decoration awarded for valor in combat.

Owens rose to the general's rank and served as Chief of Staff, III Marine Amphibious Force during the Vietnam War. He completed his service as Commanding general, 1st Marine Aircraft Wing in April 1972.

== Early career ==
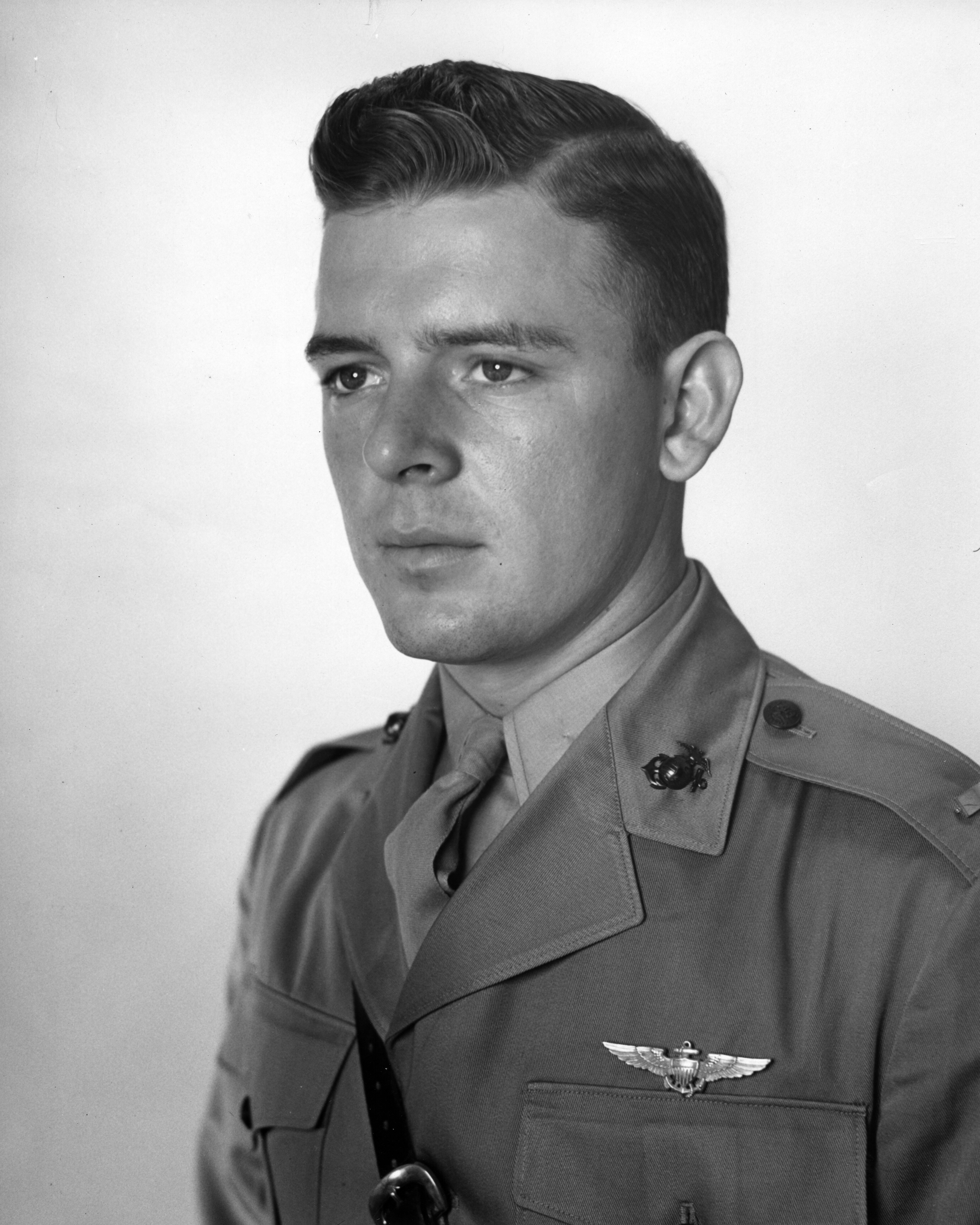
Owens as recently commissioned 2nd Lieutenant in July 1940

Robert G. Owens Jr. was born on February 13, 1917, in Greenville, South Carolina as the son of Robert G. Owens, but grew up with his uncle, Fielder Owens and his family. He graduated from Greenville High School in summer 1934 and enrolled the Furman University also located in Greenville. While at the University, Owens was a member of Young Democrats and also served as President of Delta Sigma Phi for two years.

He graduated with a Bachelor of Science degree in Biology in June 1938 and after one year in the family truck company, he enlisted in the Marine Corps Reserve as Private First Class in August 1939. He was stationed with Marine Detachment Naval Air Station Seattle for one month, before he was assigned to the Aviation Cadet Program at Naval Air Station Pensacola, Florida. Owens completed flight training and was commissioned as a Reserve second lieutenant in June 1940.

Upon his commissioning, he was ordered to San Diego, California and joined Marine Bombing Squadron 2 under Major Ira L. Kimes. Owens began flying air patrols along the coast of California in the new Douglas SBD Dauntless dive bomber, before his squadron was transferred to Hawaii in early 1941. In anticipation of the large expansion Marine Aviation was about to undergo, the squadron was re-designated Marine Scout Bombing Squadron 232 (VMSB-232) in July 1941. Owens was stationed at Marine Corps Air Station Ewa, Oahu and participated in the patrolling of Pearl Harbor during the increasing tensions in the Pacific.

== World War II ==
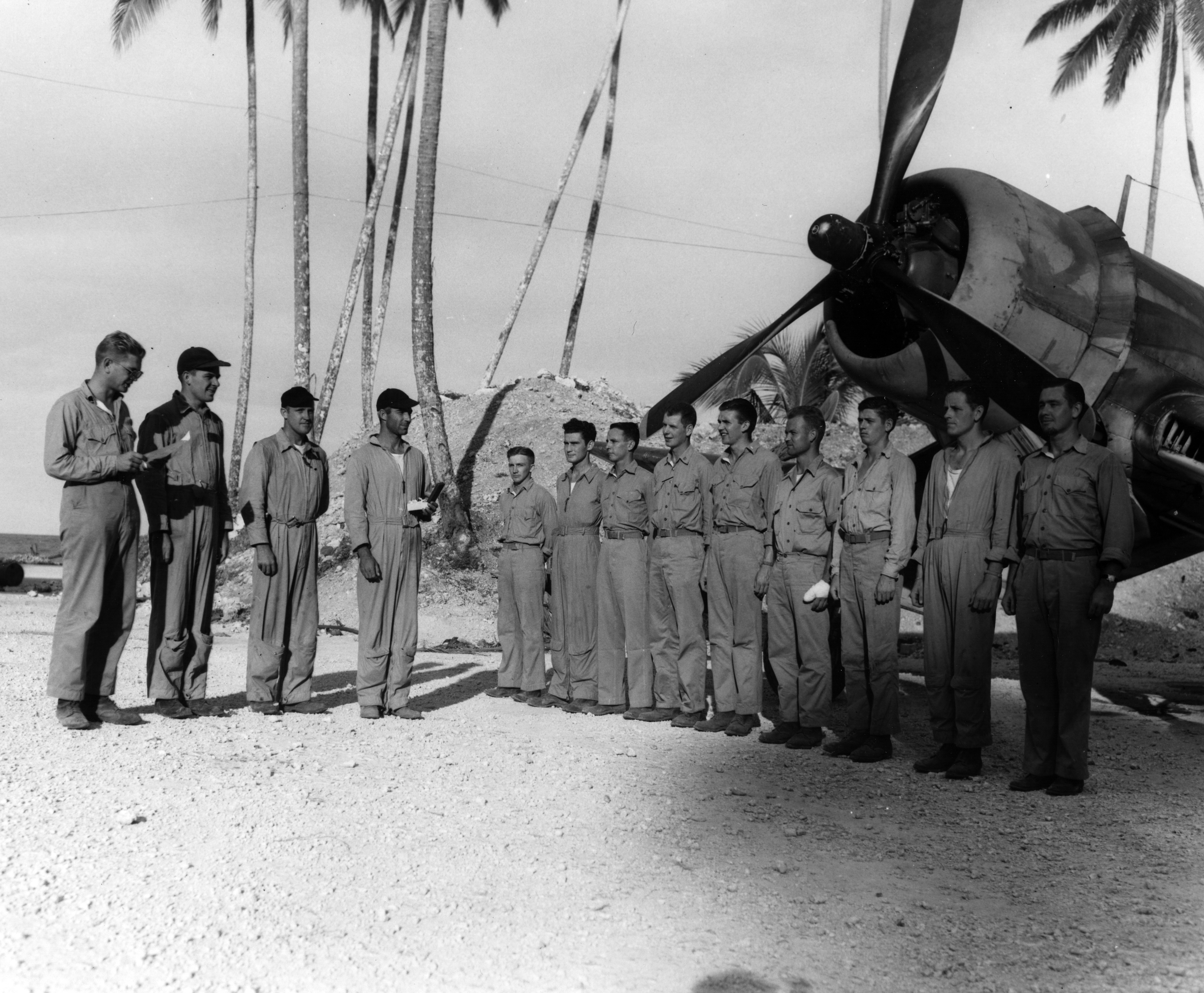
Owens (second from left) during the award ceremony of members of VMF-215 at Vella Lavella Island in November 1943

During the Japanese attack on Pearl Harbor on December 7, 1941, Owens participated in the defense of the island, during which one member of the squadron was killed and nine of the squadron's aircraft were destroyed. Two months following the Japanese attack, Owens was promoted to first lieutenant and joined the newly activated Marine Fighting Squadron 215 at Marine Corps Air Station Santa Barbara, California. He was promoted to Captain in May 1942 and served as Squadron's executive officer during the initial training on Grumman F4F Wildcats.

The squadron was transferred to Hawaii in February 1943 and transitioned to Vought F4U Corsairs, while Owens was promoted to Major in May 1943 and assumed command of the squadron. He led his unit to Midway Atoll and conducted combat air patrols for allied shipping for two months, before they were transferred to a new base at Espiritu Santo, New Hebrides. Owens then participated in air strikes against Japanese bases in the northern Solomon Islands, New Georgia, and the Bismarck Archipelago. His squadron also provided air cover for the landings at Empress Augusta Bay on Bougainville, which began on November 1, 1943.

In January 1944, Owens led his squadron during aerial combat over Rabaul, New Guinea and personally shot down seven Japanese aircraft and probably destroyed five additional planes. Unfortunately his plane was shot down by Japanese anti-aircraft guns. Although burned in the face, arm and leg, he succeeded in landing his crippled plane in the water where a rescue PBY Catalina picked him up.

Owens became a flying ace for shooting down seven Japanese aircraft and received the Navy Cross, the United States second-highest decoration awarded for valor in combat. He also received five awards of Distinguished Flying Cross, eleven Air Medals and Purple Heart for his wounds.

He was subsequently ordered back to the United States for treatment and a new assignment. Owens then assumed command of newly activated Marine Aircraft Group 46 at Marine Corps Air Station El Toro, California and supervised the training of replacement pilots and crew for Marine squadrons operating in combat areas. He remained in that assignment for the rest of the War.

== Postwar service ==
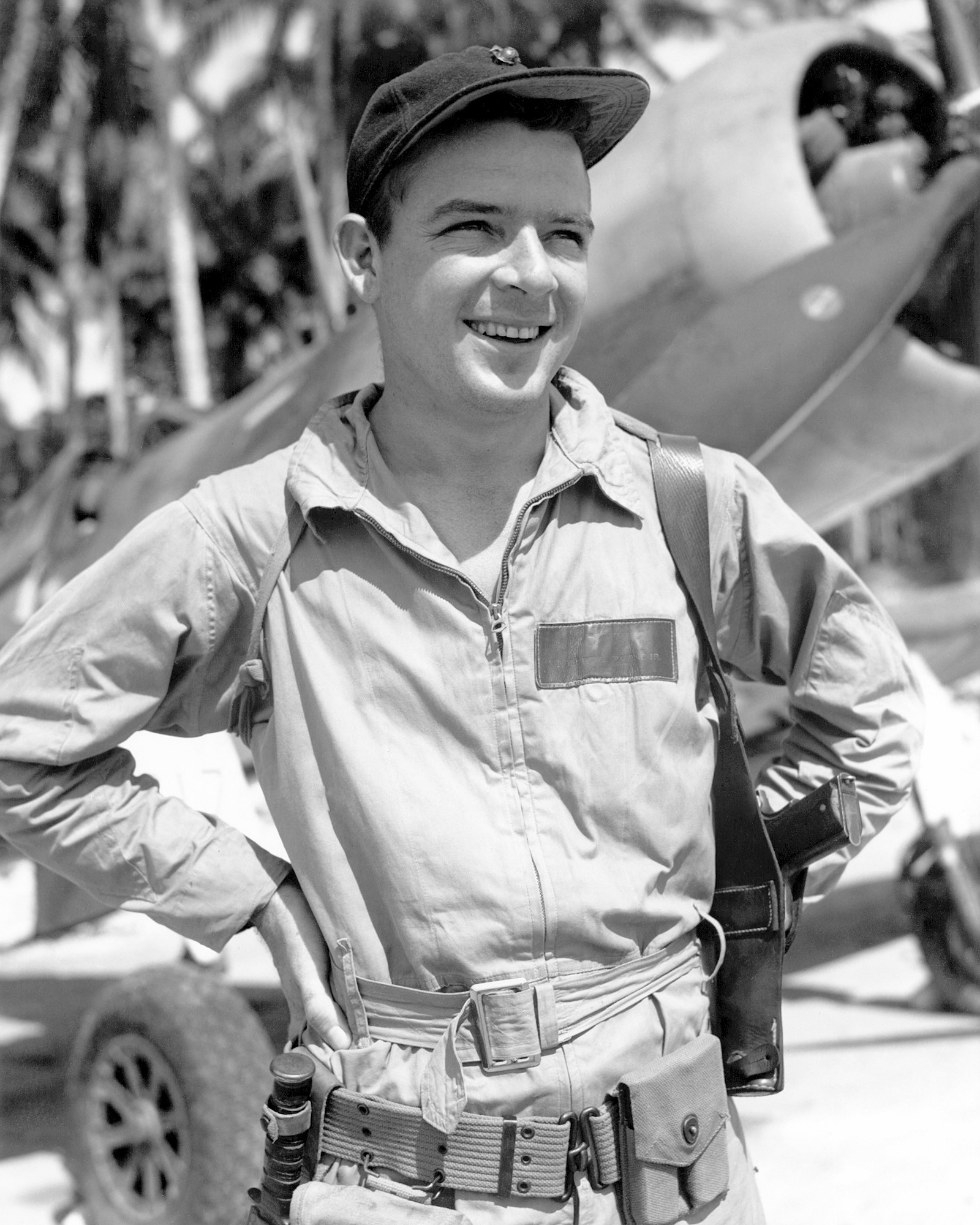
Major Owens at Vella Lavella Island in November 1943

Following the surrender of Japan in August 1945, Owens joined the staff of Marine Fighter Attack Squadron 321 and participated in the occupation of Japan. The squadron was ordered back to the United States in early 1946 and Owen was transferred to the headquarters, Aircraft, Fleet Marine Force, Pacific under Major general James T. Moore. While in this capacity, he participated in the Chinese Civil War, where units of the 1st Marine Aircraft Wing provided support actions for allied units.

By the end of 1946, Owens returned stateside and was assigned to the Division of Reserve at Headquarters Marine Corps in Washington, D.C. and served under Major general William T. Clement for two years. He decided to remain in the Marines and was transferred to the active list.

In early 1948, Owens was ordered to the Marine Corps Schools at Marine Corps Base Quantico, Virginia for the Junior Course, which he completed in August that year and was promoted to lieutenant colonel. Upon the completion of the course, he was ordered to Marine Corps Base Camp Lejeune, North Carolina and assumed duty as Division Air Officer, 2nd Marine Division under Major General Franklin A. Hart. During the Korean War the 2nd Marine Division remained in the States, maintained combat readiness and trained replacement personnel for units deployed in combat areas.

Owens was transferred to the Headquarters, Aircraft, Fleet Marine Force, Atlantic under Major General Louis E. Woods in October 1950 and then assumed command of Marine Fighter Attack Squadron 115. During his tenure, the squadron became the first Marine Corps squadron equipped with Grumman F9F-2 Panther jets. He was transferred to the 2nd Marine Aircraft Wing and assumed duty as the assistant operations officer under the command of MajGen Woods, who dual hatted as Commander, Aircraft, FMF, Atlantic and 2nd MAW;

In June 1952, Owens was ordered to the Air War College at Maxwell Air Force Base, Alabama and completed the senior course there one year later. Upon graduation, he was ordered to Marine Corps Air Station El Toro, California and assumed duty as the operations officer of Marine Aircraft Group 15. Owens was transferred to command Marine Fighter Attack Squadron 323 stationed at MCAS El Toro in March 1954 and his duty consisted of peacetime tactical flight training, and exercises of aerial gunnery and close air support missions.

Owens entered helicopter training in August 1954 and upon completion in May 1955, he joined Marine Aircraft Group 16, attached to 1st Marine Aircraft Wing at Marine Corps Air Station Iwakuni, Japan. He served consecutively as the Group's Logistics Officer and Operations Officer and returned to the United States in June 1956 for duty as Senior Marine Officer on the staff of Chief of Naval Air Basic Training at Naval Air Station Pensacola, Florida. Owens served under Rear Admiral Joseph M. Carson and was promoted to Colonel in September 1957.

In February 1958, he was transferred to Hawaii, where he joined the headquarters, Fleet Marine Force, Pacific as Deputy Assistant Chief of Staff for Operations (G-3) under Lieutenant General Vernon E. Megee. While in Hawaii, Owens assumed command of Marine Aircraft Group 13 attached to 1st Marine Brigade under Brigadier General Richard G. Weede. The brigade served as a Marine Air-Ground Task Force prepared to strike whenever is needed.

Owens was ordered to Washington, D.C. in September 1961 and joined the Division of Operations at Headquarters Marine Corps as Assistant Head, Plans Branch. He remained in that capacity until August 1963, when he entered the senior course at National War College. While in Washington, Owens also earned a Master's degree in International Relations from George Washington University.

== Vietnam War ==
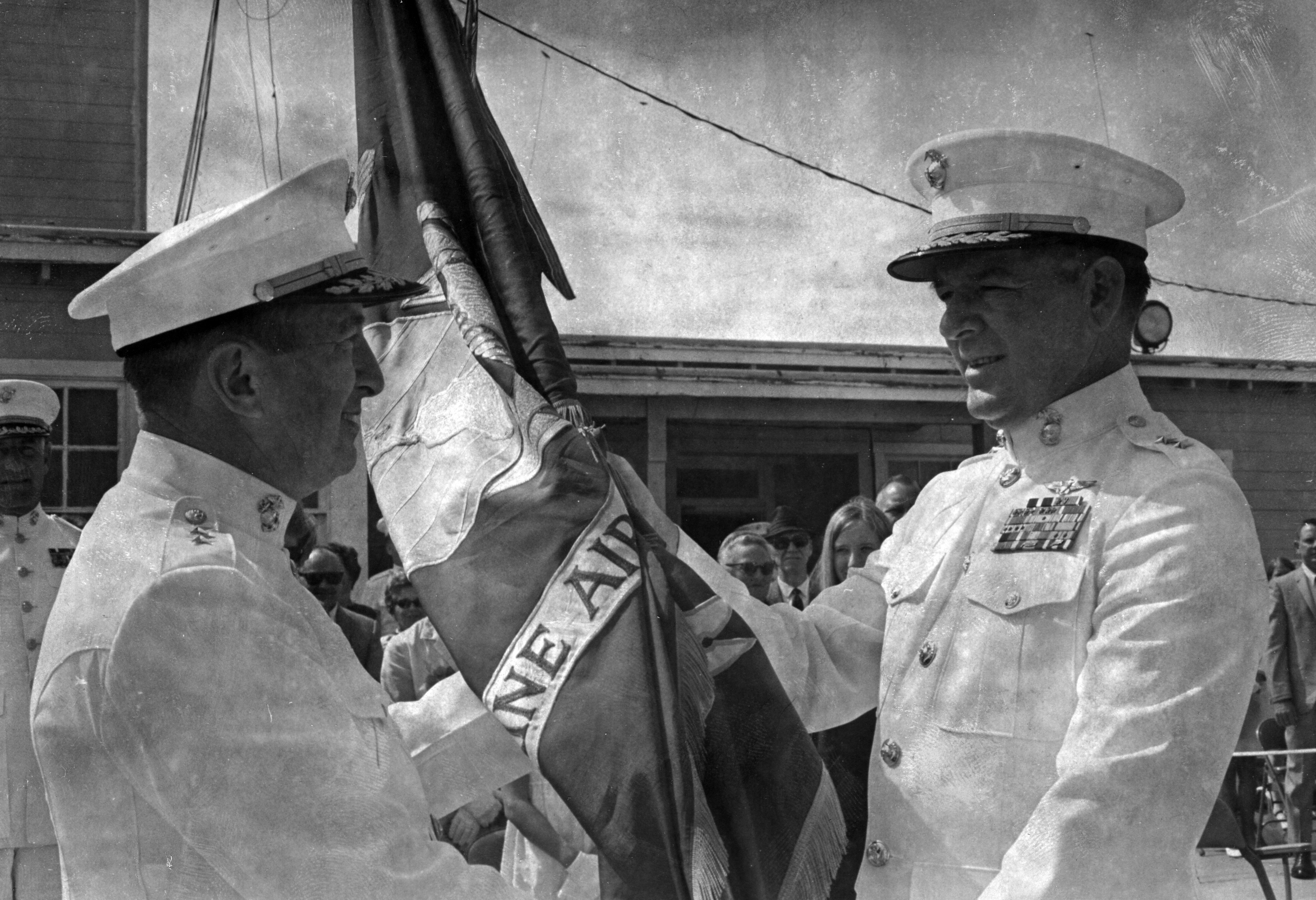
Owens (right) receives colors of 3rd MAW from Major general Arthur H. Adams during change of command ceremony at MCAS El Toro, June 1969.

Upon the completion of the National War College in June 1964, Owens was assigned to the Joint Staff, Joint Chiefs of Staff as a member of the Pacific Division Operations Directorate. While in this capacity, he was promoted to Brigadier general on July 1, 1965 and assumed duty as Deputy Director for Command Areas, Operations Directorate. Owen served in this capacity during the opening months of Vietnam War and received Legion of Merit for his service.

In September 1966, Owen served as Deputy Director of Marine Corps Personnel under his former superior from 1st Marine Brigade, now Major general Richard G. Weede and departed for South Vietnam in December that year. He joined the headquarters, 1st Marine Aircraft Wing under Major general Louis Robertshaw at Da Nang Air Base and as Assistant Wing Commander, Owens participated in the planning and supervising of Wing's operations until April 1967.

He was then transferred to the headquarters of III Marine Amphibious Force and served successively under lieutenant generals Lewis W. Walt and Robert E. Cushman Jr. as their Chief of Staff. Owens completed his tour in Vietnam in December 1967 and received his second Legion of Merit for his service. He also received National Order of Vietnam and Vietnam Gallantry Cross with Palm.

Following his return to the United States, Owens was ordered back to the Headquarters Marine Corps and assumed duty as Assistant Chief of Staff for Operations. He was promoted to Major general on September 1, 1968 and received his third Legion of Merit for his service at Headquarters Marine Corps. In March 1969, he was an honorary pallbearer at President Dwight D. Eisenhower's funeral.

In May 1969, Owens was ordered to the Marine Corps Air Station El Toro, California and assumed duty as Commanding General, 3rd Marine Aircraft Wing. While in this capacity, he was responsible for the demobilization of Aircraft personnel and units returning from Vietnam. Owens served in this capacity until April 1971 and received his fourth Legion of Merit.

Owens was then ordered to Marine Corps Air Station Iwakuni, Japan and assumed command of 1st Marine Aircraft Wing, recently redeployed from South Vietnam. His units provided critical attack, fighter, electronic warfare, and support aircraft needed to augment U.S. air strength in South Vietnam and Thailand. He remained in Japan until April 1972 and then returned to the United States. Owens was decorated with fifth Legion of Merit and was ordered home, awaiting retirement.

== Retirement ==
On August 1, 1972, Owens retired from active duty after 33 years of active service and settled in Newport Beach, California, where he pursued a career in real estate. He played golf and raised orchids in his free time and also served as President of the Rotary Club of Newport Beach.

In the last years of his life, Owens lived with his wife in Fraser Meadows Retirement Community in Boulder, Colorado, where he died on October 31, 2007, aged 90. He was buried with full military honors at Arlington National Cemetery in Virginia. His wife and high school sweetheart Marjorie Frances Hart Owens is buried beside him. They had two sons Robert G. III and Stanley.

== Decorations ==
Major general Owen's personal decorations include:

Naval Aviator Badge
1st Row	Navy Cross		Legion of Merit with Combat "V" and four 5/16" Gold Stars	
2nd Row	Distinguished Flying Cross with four 5/16" Gold Stars	Air Medal with one silver and two gold 5/16" Gold Stars	Purple Heart	Navy Presidential Unit Citation
3rd Row	Navy Unit Commendation	American Defense Service Medal	American Campaign Medal	Asiatic-Pacific Campaign Medal with four 3/16 inch service stars
4th Row	World War II Victory Medal	Navy Occupation Service Medal	China Service Medal	National Defense Service Medal with one service star
5th Row	Vietnam Service Medal with two 3/16 inch service stars	National Order of Vietnam, Knight	Vietnam Gallantry Cross with Palm	Vietnam Campaign Medal

== See also ==
- List of 1st Marine Aircraft Wing commanders

Military offices
Preceded by Alan J. Armstrong	Commanding General, 1st Marine Aircraft Wing; April 1971 - April 1, 1972	Succeeded by Leslie E. Brown
Preceded by Arthur H. Adams	Commanding General, 3rd Marine Aircraft Wing; June 1969 - April 1971	Succeeded by Leslie E. Brown
