= Robert M. Hanson =

American flying ace (1920–1944)

Robert Murray Hanson
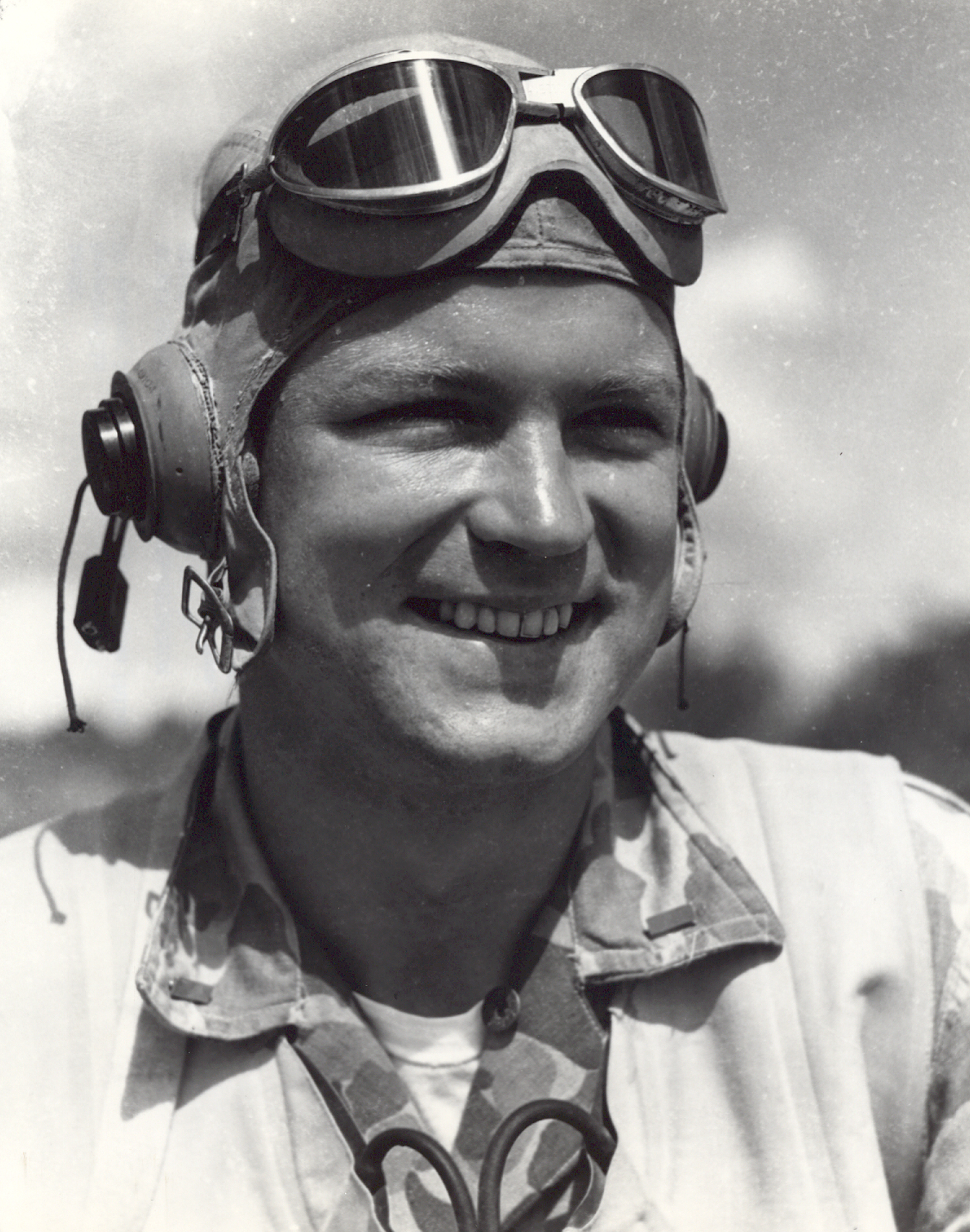
- Born: 4 February 1920; Lucknow, India
- Died: 3 February 1944 (aged 23); Cape St. George, New Ireland
- Burial place: Remains not recovered; cenotaph memorials in Manila, the Philippines and Newton, Massachusetts
- Military career
- Allegiance: United States
- Branch: United States Marine Corps
- Service years: 1942–1944
- Rank: First Lieutenant
- Nickname: "Butcher Bob"
- Units: VMF-214; VMF-215
- Conflicts: World War II
- Awards: Medal of Honor; Navy Cross; Purple Heart (2); Air Medal

Robert Murray Hanson (4 February 1920 – 3 February 1944) was a United States Marine Corps flying ace who shot down 25 Japanese planes from the South Pacific skies. He posthumously received the Medal of Honor. One of five children, he is the elder brother of Edith Hanson and Earl Dorchester Hanson.

== Early years ==
Robert M. Hanson was the son of Methodist missionaries who served for several decades in India. In Lucknow, India, his playmates were Hindu children. He attended an American-run missionary school, Woodstock School, in Mussoorie in the Western Indian Himalayas, along with his siblings, Mark, Stanley, Earl, and Edith. After attending junior high school in the United States, he returned to India to become light-heavyweight and heavy-weight wrestling champion of the United Provinces of Agra and Oudh, at the time a large province in northern India. In his honor, the sports field at the Woodstock School is still named Hanson Field.

== World War II ==
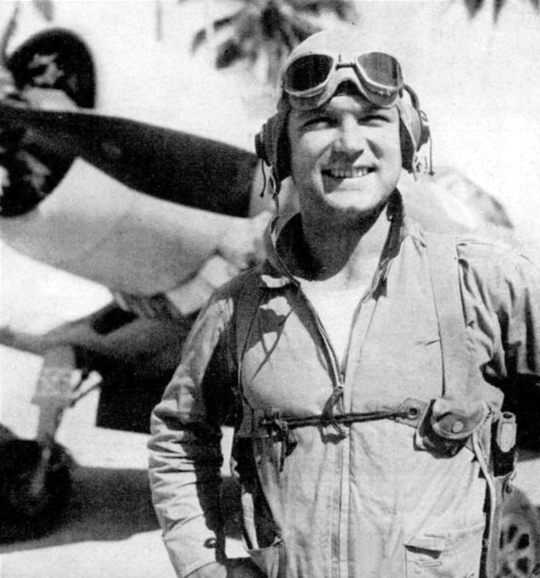
Robert M. Hanson

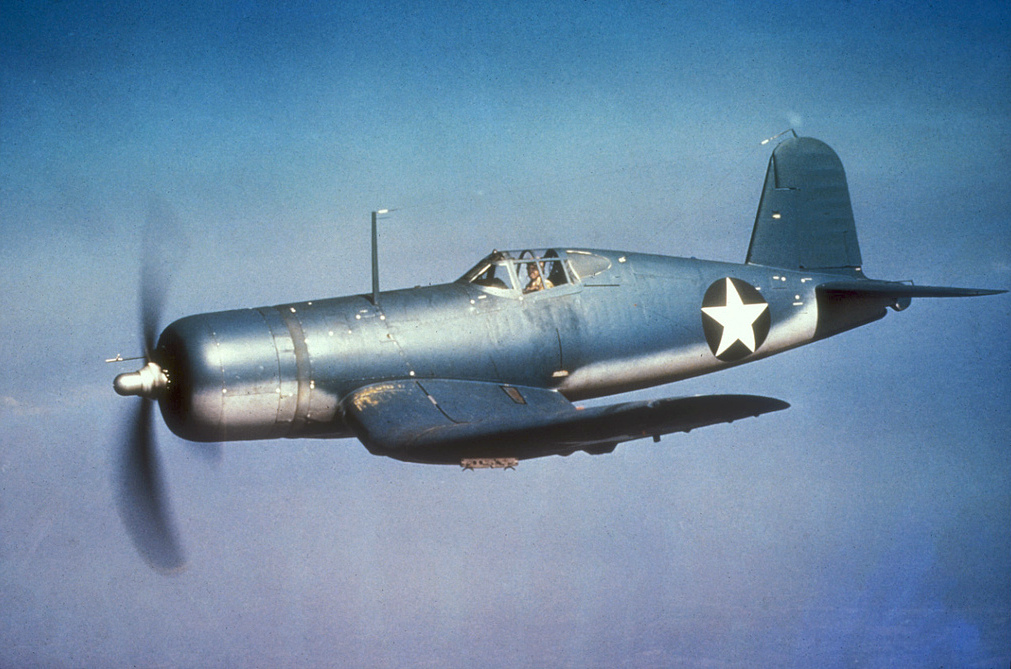
Vought F4U-1 Corsair fighter

In the spring of 1938, on his way back to the United States to attend college, he bicycled his way through Europe and was in Vienna during the Anschluss. He was attending Hamline University, St. Paul, Minnesota, at the time of the attack on Pearl Harbor. He enlisted for naval flight training in May 1942 and earned his wings and a Marine Corps commission as a second lieutenant on 19 February 1943, in Corpus Christi, Texas.

First Lieutenant Hanson arrived in the South Pacific in June 1943 and his daring tactics and total disregard for death soon became well known. A master of individual air combat, he downed 20 enemy planes in six consecutive flying days. He was commended in the citation accompanying the Medal of Honor for his bold attack against six enemy torpedo bombers, 1 November 1943, over Bougainville Island, and for bringing down four Zeros, the premier Japanese fighter, while fighting them alone over New Britain, 24 January 1944.

A member of VMF-215 flying the F4U-1 Corsair, the ace was shot down twice. The first time, a Zero caught him over Bougainville Island. Bringing his plane down on the ocean, he paddled for six hours in a rubber life raft before being rescued by the USS Sigourney (DD-643). His second and fatal crash occurred one day before his twenty-fourth birthday. He was last seen on 3 February 1944, when his plane crashed into the sea after a cancelled (due to overcast) fighter sweep mission over Rabaul, New Britain. He was attempting to destroy a lighthouse on Cape St. George, Southern New Ireland, that often gave the fighter group trouble by firing flak at the fighter group as they passed the lighthouse. His squadron leader Capt. Harold L. Spears watched as he attempted to land his damaged plane in the water during rough seas. His plane cartwheeled when one of the wings grabbed a wave, and the plane disintegrated. He had no time to escape the cockpit, thus sank with his plane. He was subsequently declared killed in action.

The Medal of Honor was presented to the lieutenant's mother by Maj. Gen. Lewie G. Merritt on 19 August 1944, in Boston, Massachusetts.

== Citations ==
=== Medal of Honor citation ===
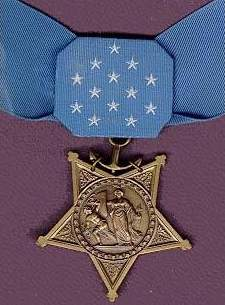
Navy version

The President of the United States takes pleasure in presenting the MEDAL OF HONOR to

FIRST LIEUTENANT ROBERT M. HANSON
UNITED STATES MARINE CORPS RESERVE

for service as set forth in the following CITATION:

For conspicuous gallantry and intrepidity at the risk of his life above and beyond the call of duty as a fighter pilot attached to Marine Fighting Squadron TWO FIFTEEN in action against Japanese forces at Bougainville Islands, 1 November 1943, and New Britain Island, 24 January 1944. Undeterred by fierce opposition and fearless in the face of overwhelming odds, First Lieutenant Hanson fought the Japanese boldly and with daring aggressiveness. On 1 November, while flying cover for our landing operations at Empress Augusta Bay, he dauntlessly attacked six enemy torpedo bombers, forcing them to jettison their bombs and destroying one Japanese plane during the action. Cut off from his division while deep in enemy territory during a high cover flight over Simpson Harbor on 24 January, First Lieutenant Hanson waged a lone and gallant battle against hostile interceptors as they were orbiting to attack our bombers and, striking with devastating fury, brought down four Zeros and probably a fifth. Handling his plane superbly in both pursuit and attack measures, he was a master of individual air combat, accounting for a total of 25 Japanese aircraft in this theater of war. His great personal valor and invincible fighting spirit were in keeping with the highest traditions of the United States Naval Service.

/S/ FRANKLIN ROOSEVELT

=== Navy Cross citation ===
Citation:

The President of the United States of America takes pleasure in presenting the Navy Cross to First Lieutenant Robert Murray Hanson (MCSN: 0-19154), United States Marine Corps Reserve, for extraordinary heroism and distinguished service in the line of his profession as Pilot of a Fighter Plane attached to Marine Fighting Squadron TWO HUNDRED FIFTEEN (VMF-215), Marine Air Group FOURTEEN (MAG-14), FIRST Marine Aircraft Wing, in aerial combat against enemy Japanese forces in the Solomon Islands Area from 5 January 1944 to 3 February 1944. Intercepted by a superior number of Japanese fighters while covering a flight of our bombers in a strike against enemy shipping in Simpson harbor on 14 January, First Lieutenant Hanson boldly engaged the hostile planes in fierce combat, pressing home repeated attacks with devastating force. Separated from his squadron during the intense action, he valiantly continued the engagement alone, successfully destroying five enemy Zeros before being forced by lack of ammunition and gasoline to return to his base. First Lieutenant Hanson's superb airmanship, brilliant initiative and dauntless fighting spirit enabled our bombers to deliver a crushing blow to the Japanese in that sector and return safe to their base and his conduct throughout was in keeping with the highest traditions of the United States Naval Service.

== Awards and decorations ==

| Badge | Naval Aviator insignia | | |
| 1st row | Medal of Honor | | Navy Cross |
| 2nd row | Purple Heart with gold star | Air Medal | Presidential Unit Citation |
| 3rd row | American Campaign Medal | Asiatic-Pacific Campaign Medal with two campaign stars | World War II Victory Medal |

== See also ==
- United States Marine Corps aviation
- List of Medal of Honor recipients
