= Earl Dorchester Hanson =

American biologist (1927–1993)

Earl Dorchester Hanson (c.1927 – October 26, 1993) was born in Northern India to Methodist Missionaries. He attended an American-run missionary school, Woodstock School, in Mussoorie in the Western Indian Himalayas, along with his siblings. He is the older brother of Edith Hanson and younger brother of Robert M. Hanson. After serving in the United States Marine Corps in World War II, he graduated from Bowdoin College and earned a Ph.D. in biology in 1954 from Indiana University Bloomington.

In an academic career that spanned nearly 40 years, Professor Hanson was one of the first to advocate ethical training of young scientists. He also urged improved development of scientific teaching for nonscientists, with an emphasis on how genetic engineering could affect society. Toward that end, he founded and was the chairman of the Science in Society program at Wesleyan University.

From 1965 to 1967, he was chairman of the national Commission on Undergraduate Education in the Biological Sciences.

Hanson, a professor of biology, concentrated on intracellular genetics. He was the author in 1981 of the widely used textbook, Understanding Evolution. He also was the author of "The Origin and Early Evolution of Animals" (1977) and of more than 50 research articles.

== Honored for Teaching ==
He was regarded as a popular and first-rate teacher, winning the Harbison Award for Distinguished Teaching in 1970.

Much of his activity in recent years involved educating nonscientists about contemporary problems and possibilities in biology and other fields.

He was on the Yale University faculty from 1954 to 1960, when he joined the Wesleyan faculty. He was elected a fellow of the American Association for the Advancement of Science in 1991.
