= VMM-264 =

Marine Medium Tiltrotor Squadron 264
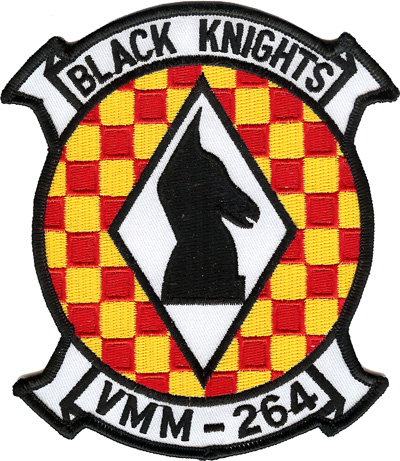
- VMM-264 Insignia
- Active: 30 June 1959 – 24 June 2020 // 1 October 2025-Present
- Country: United States
- Allegiance: United States of America
- Branch: United States Marine Corps
- Type: Medium-lift Tiltrotor Squadron
- Role: Conduct air operations in support of the Fleet Marine Force
- Part of: Marine Aircraft Group 26; 2nd Marine Aircraft Wing
- Garrison/HQ: Marine Corps Air Station New River
- Nickname: Black Knights
- Tail Code: EH
- Engagements: Operation Power Pack; Operation Iraqi Freedom * 2003 invasion of Iraq '"Operation Enduring Freedom'"

Commanders
- Current commander: LtCol Paul Lancaster

Marine Medium Tiltrotor Squadron 264 (VMM-264) is a United States Marine Corps tiltrotor squadron consisting of MV-22 Osprey transport aircraft. The squadron, known as the "Black Knights", is based at Marine Corps Air Station New River, North Carolina, and normally falls under the command of Marine Aircraft Group 26 (MAG-26) and 2nd Marine Aircraft Wing (2nd MAW). They were the last east coast CH-46 Sea Knight squadron to transition to the Osprey. VMM-264 was decommissioned on 24 June 2020. In accordance with the Deputy Commandant of Aviation planning guidance, VMM-264 reactivated on 11 December 2025

== Mission ==
Provide assault support of combat troops, supplies and equipment during amphibious operations.

== History ==
=== Early years ===
Marine Medium Helicopter Squadron 264 (HMM-264) was commissioned on 30 June 1959. Originally designated as Marine Medium Transportation Squadron Light 264, it was later re-designated to its present title, Marine Medium Helicopter 264, in February 1962.

In the fall of 1961, the squadron was called upon to assist in the evacuation and resupply of victims of Hurricane Hattie, which hit Belize. This tasking was the first mission in a now long-standing tradition of humanitarian service.

On 28 April 1965, HMM-264 conducted the Marine Corps' first night all-helicopter assault into an unsecured landing zone during combat conditions in Santo Domingo, Dominican Republic from the deck of the USS Boxer during Operation Power Pack. Between HMM-264 and the LSTs more than 600 civilians were evacuated from the Embajador Hotel. This event marked the first landing of U.S. Marines on Dominican soil since the early 1930s. It was also the first ship-to-shore heliborne lift over a hostile beach without supporting units ashore. Over the course of the operation, the American embassy was secured and over 1,750 American citizens were evacuated from the war-torn Dominican Republic.

In May 1965, HMM-264 was the first Marine helicopter squadron to surpass 25,000 mishap-free flight hours. Over the next several years, the squadron logged 30,000, 40,000, and 50,000 mishap-free flight hour milestones.

In 1968, the squadron retired the last of its aging fleet of UH-34 helicopters, receiving in its place the Boeing-Vertol CH-46 Sea Knight aircraft.

=== The 1970s and 1980s ===
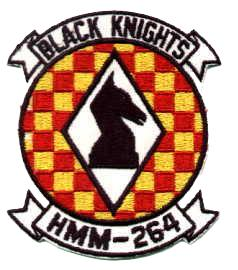
Old HMM-264 insignia.

HMM-264 served as part of the Multinational Peacekeeping Force in Beirut, Lebanon in 1983. Amongst other contributions, the squadron rescued a number of Lebanese civilians stranded by snow in the Chauf Mountains, resulting in a number of squadron awards including the Defense Transportation Safety Award, the Marine Corps Expeditionary Medal, the Navy Unit Commendation, and the 1983 Chief of Naval Operations Aviation Safety Award.

Throughout the early 1980s, the Black Knights were frequent visitors to the Mediterranean as the Aviation Combat Element (ACE) for deploying east coast Marine Amphibious Units supporting Landing Force Sixth Fleet (LF6F) commitments. During this period, the squadron participated in numerous exercises and contingency operations from Spain to Lebanon.

In 1987, HMM-264 became the first ACE to deploy with AV-8B Harriers and elements from the Marine Air Control Group (MACG). Deployed on the USS Nassau, the squadron participated in Spanish, Italian, and French PHILBEXs. These additions to the ACE force list later became the norm for deploying LF6F Marine Expeditionary Units (MEU).

=== The 1990s ===
In January 1990 (some reports say May 1989), upon returning from LF6F 2-90, HMM-264 was tasked to support Operation Top Kick off the coast of Colombia. The squadron provided support throughout this event, which culminated in the Presidential drug summit in Cartagena, Colombia in February 1990. The Black Knights earned a Joint Meritorious Unit Citation for their efforts during the operation.

In April 1991, the squadron was diverted from operations in Sardinia and sailed to Iskendrun, Turkey. For 92 days, the Black Knights acted as the lead aviation element for coalition efforts to provide assistance and security to the Kurdish refugees in northern Iraq as part of Operation Provide Comfort. During the first two weeks of Operation Provide Comfort, the Black Knights flew more than 1000 hours delivering more than 450 tons of relief supplies to the isolated Kurdish camps high in the mountains of Iraq. The squadron was awarded the Joint Meritorious Unit Commendation, Humanitarian Service Medal, and the Southwest Asia Service Medal with Bronze Star device.

In June 1994, the Black Knights celebrated the squadron's 35th anniversary. By August, the squadron had again reinforced and embarked aboard USS Wasp as the ACE for Special Purpose Marine Air Ground Task Force (SPMAGTF) Caribbean and subsequently deployed in support of Operation Support Democracy and Operation Uphold Democracy in Haiti. On 20 September 1994, HMM-264 participated in a vertical assault of the Cap Haitian Airport and port facilities. This event marked the first Marine landing in Haiti since the early 1900s. Over the course of these operations, HMM-264 also supported a variety of missions including raids, logistical support, humanitarian service flights, and MEDEVAC support. The squadron received the Humanitarian Service Medal and the Armed Forces Expeditionary Medal for its support to these operations.

During the spring of 1995, the squadron returned to the Mediterranean as the ACE of the 26th Marine Expeditionary Unit (MEU). During this period, HMM-264 flew 99 fixed wing sorties and 36 rotary wing sorties in support of Operation Deny Flight and Operation Decisive Endeavor in Bosnia-Herzegovina.

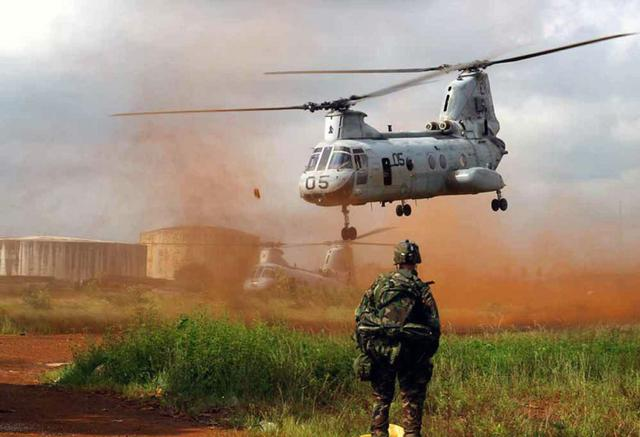
HMM-264 transports troops out of Monrovia, at Roberts International Airport, Liberia, during Joint Task Force (JTF) Liberia in 1996

In June 1996, with 66 hours of notification, the Black Knights deployed with SPMAGTF Liberia to conduct embassy reinforcement, security, and resupply operations in the West African city of Monrovia, capital of Liberia. HMM-264 deployed four (4) CH-46E and two (2) UH-1N aircraft aboard the USS Ponce and set sail across the Atlantic Ocean. Over a two-month period the Black Knights operated out of Freetown, Sierra Leone, supporting both fellow Marines and the U.S. Embassy despite austere conditions and the logistical challenges of long-distance operations. The squadron received the Humanitarian Service Medal and the Joint Meritorious Commendation Medal for its service.

HMM-264 provided the first NATO TACAIR assets to operate ashore in Bosnia-Herzegovina since the signing of the Dayton Peace Accords. HMM-264 returned from another deployment in August 1998 and earned the Armed Forces Service Medal, Armed Forces Expeditionary Medal, and a Meritorious Unit Commendation. HMM-264 was also selected as the Marine Corps Aviation Association, Marine Medium Helicopter Squadron of the Year for 1998.

In September 1999, the Black Knights conducted a hurricane evacuation in advance of the approach of Hurricane Floyd. The squadron returned to flood ravaged North Carolina and provided support to Federal Emergency Management Agency and the citizens of North Carolina. The Black Knights conducted relief missions and facilitated the movement of congressional members and other VIPs throughout the affected area. In early December, the squadron provided support to the MV-22 Operational Test Evaluation by conducting the first shipboard interoperability training on board USS Saipan.

=== Global War on Terror ===
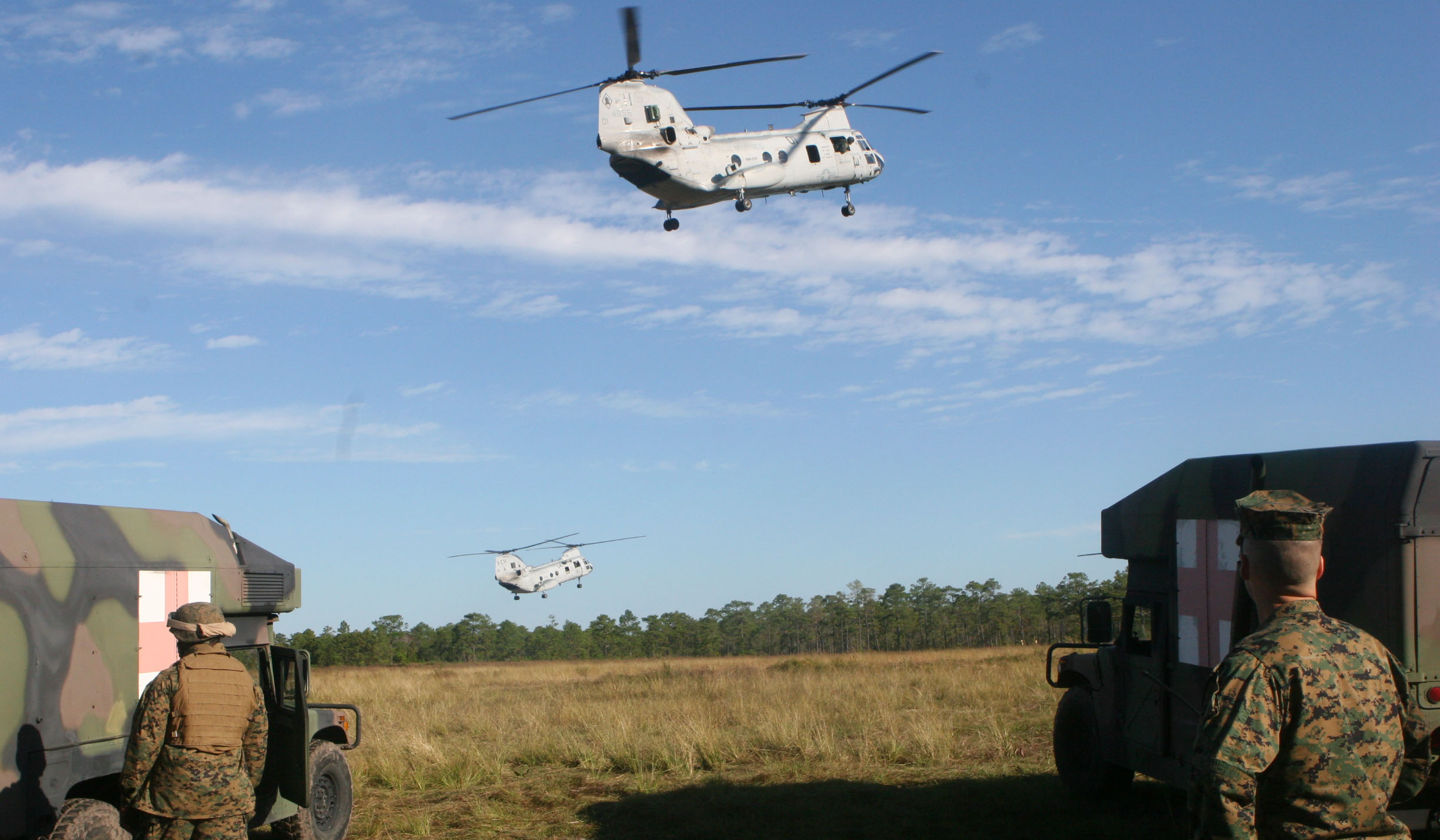
Two CH-46 "Sea Knights" soar away as they transport Marines injured in a simulated improvised explosive device attack during a level one and level two casualty evacuation exercise performed by 2nd Medical Battalion, 2nd Marine Logistics Group, at Camp Lejeune on 31 October 2007.

On 5 March 2003, the squadron embarked on a planned eight-month deployment on the maiden voyage of the USS Iwo Jima. The squadron conducted operations in Northern Iraq, which started on 14 April 2003 and lasted two weeks. Six CH-46E and six CH-53Es flew over 495 miles (797 km) from the Mediterranean Sea into Irbil and Mosul Iraq. Historically, this flight is the longest self-deployed flight into land operations by any MEU. In support of Operation Iraqi Freedom, the squadron flew reconnaissance and presence flights in the northern area of Iraq. During the squadron's deployment it was the ready ARG for over a month in the Persian Gulf in support of Operation Enduring Freedom, and exercise Djibouti-Ex in Djibouti, Africa. For two months the squadron flew in support of Joint Task Force Liberia, to stabilize post civil war Liberia until ECOWAS military forces were in place. In October, the Black Knights returned home after nearly eight months on deployment. The squadron was awarded the Humanitarian Service Medal for operations in Liberia and the new Global War on Terrorism (Expeditionary) Medal for Operations in Iraq, the Persian Gulf, and the Horn of Africa.

In January 2005, the squadron departed to Al Asad, Iraq in support of OIF 04–06. While in Iraq, the Black Knights conducted casevac, VIP transport, assault support operations and participated in Operation Matador. In late August 2005, the Black Knights returned to New River, only to be tapped for a detachment to assist in the Hurricane Katrina relief efforts.

The squadron was deployed as the aviation combat element of the 26th Marine Expeditionary Unit in the fall of 2008. Upon their return in April 2009, they were the last east coast squadron to transition to the MV-22 Osprey.

Since achieving operational status under the MV-22 platform, VMM-264 has performed 2 deployments in support of Operation Enduring Freedom. Their first deployment in December 2010 saw a milestone for the V-22 community as an aircraft piloted by the Black Knights on 10 February 2011, broke the 100,000-flight-hour mark for the platform as a whole. The squadron deployed again a second time in January 2013 .

=== Ebola Virus Disease Outbreak in West Africa ===
In response to the increased spread of the Ebola Virus Disease in West Africa, the United States began Operation United Assistance (OUA). The need for airlift assets was promptly recognized and in October 2014, a detachment of MV-22 deployed to Monrovia, Liberia, to fill the requirements for lift until other US military assets could arrive. Within 3 days of arriving in Monrovia, VMM-264 began flying operations to support the response to the viral outbreak. Over the following weeks, VMM-264 executed a wide variety of tasks ranging from moving VIPs, carrying medical training teams, assisting NGOs, and lifting medical supplies across Liberia. VMM-264 carried numerous different dignitaries including the US Ambassador to Liberia, the US Ambassador to the United Nations, the Chief of Staff of the Armed Forces of Liberia, and the President of Liberia.

VMM-264 disbanded 24 June 2020.

Marine Medium Tiltrotor Squadron (VMM) 264, "The Black Knights," was officially reactivated in a ceremony at MCAS New River, North Carolina, in December 2025, following a five-year deactivation under Force Design initiatives.

== See also ==
- List of active United States Marine Corps aircraft squadrons
- United States Marine Corps Aviation
- List of decommissioned United States Marine Corps aircraft squadrons
