= Donald N. Aldrich =

United States Marine Corps flying ace of World War II

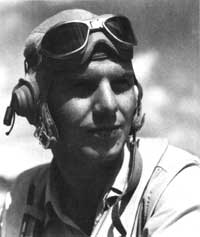
- Captain Donald N. Aldrich, c. 1943–44
- Born: 24 October 1917; Moline, Illinois, U.S.
- Died: 3 May 1947 (aged 29); Chicago, Illinois, U.S.
- Burial place: Oak Woods Cemetery
- Military career
- Allegiance: Canada; United States
- Branch: Royal Canadian Air Force (1941–42); United States Marine Corps (1942–47)
- Service years: 1941–1947
- Rank: Captain
- Unit: VMF-215
- Conflicts: World War II
- Awards: Navy Cross; Distinguished Flying Cross; Air Medal; Purple Heart (2)

Donald Nathan Aldrich (24 October 1917 – 3 May 1947) was a United States Marine Corps Reserve captain and World War II flying ace. With 20 victories, Aldrich was the fifth-highest-scoring Marine Corps ace of the war. He joined the Royal Canadian Air Force after the United States Army Air Corps refused him because he was married. Aldrich became an instructor pilot and transferred to the United States Marine Corps in late 1942. He joined VMF-215 in the Solomon Islands campaign in June 1943, flying the Vought F4U Corsair. Aldrich added to his 20 victories in three combat tours with six probables, the highest total number of probables in the Marine Corps. Postwar, Aldrich continued to serve in the Marine Corps and was killed in a 1947 plane crash.

== Early life ==
Aldrich was born on 24 October 1917 in Moline, Illinois, to Lyell and Mary Aldrich. When he was eighteen months old, he and his family moved to Chicago. His father, a mechanical engineer, owned a Waco biplane and introduced his son to flying from an early age. Aldrich was reported by one contemporary news report to have flown a hundred hours by age 12. Aldrich played football at Fenger High School, graduating in 1934. After his father died in 1933, his family was forced to sell the Waco, and Aldrich enrolled in the Armour Institute to study engineering. He dropped out after two years and worked in the Visking office, taking flying lessons. Aldrich married Marjorie in 1940.

== Military service ==
Aldridge unsuccessfully attempted to join the United States Army Air Corps, but was declined as they did not accept married men at the time. In February 1941, Aldrich joined the Royal Canadian Air Force, receiving his wings in November. He then served as an instructor pilot. He subsequently was commission a 2nd lieutenant in the U.S. Marine Corps on 14 May 1942.

He transferred to the United States Marine Corps Reserve in October 1942.

=== World War II ===
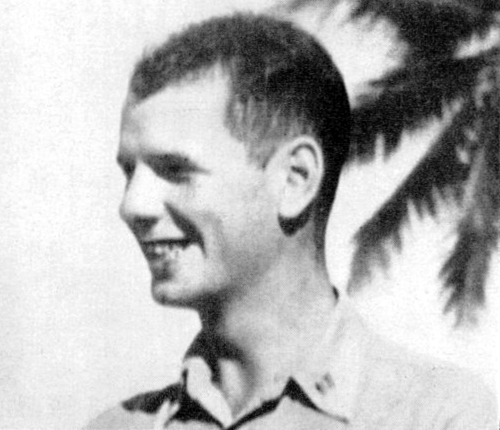
Aldrich in 1944

Aldrich became a captain in June 1943 and joined VMF-215 as a division leader, flying the Vought F4U Corsair, in the Solomon Islands campaign. On 12 August he shot down a Mitsubishi A6M Zero and claimed a probable near Ballale on a bomber escort mission. Lightly wounded on 21 August, Aldrich claimed another Zero and a probable on 25 August on another bomber escort mission. On 26 August, during a bomber escort mission, the formation was attacked by 20 Japanese fighters. Aldrich was wounded in his head and right eye and his plane was badly damaged in the engagement. Despite his wounds, he was able to down a Zero. For his actions, Aldrich was awarded the Distinguished Flying Cross. On 2 September he downed his fourth and fifth victories over Ballale, becoming an ace. Aldrich served on a second tour with the squadron without scoring victories. On his third tour, Aldrich claimed fifteen victories in less than four weeks. On 20 and 26 January, escorting bombers on attacks on the strongly defended Vunakanau Airfield and Lakunai Airfield, Aldrich destroyed four Japanese aircraft. Returning from an escort mission, Aldrich and his wingman saw five Zeroes attacking a VMF-215 pilot in the process of bailing out, and drove the Zeroes away, enabling the pilot to make a safe landing. On 28 January 1944, he shot down four Zeroes over Tobera and was wounded. His Corsair was too damaged to repair and was written off. On 9 February he downed a Nakajima Ki-44 Tojo south of Tobera, his twentieth victory. Aldrich was the fourth and last Marine ace to reach twenty victories and the fifth highest scoring. His six probables were the highest number of probable victories in the Marine Corps. By the end of the tour, Aldrich had also been awarded the Air Medal. For his actions during the third tour, he was awarded the Navy Cross on 20 July. Aldrich returned home to Chicago on leave after the end of his tour. By May 1944 Aldrich was assigned to VMF-481, training Corsair pilots at Marine Corps Air Station El Toro. In February 1945, his son, Frederick Bruce, was born.

=== Postwar and death ===
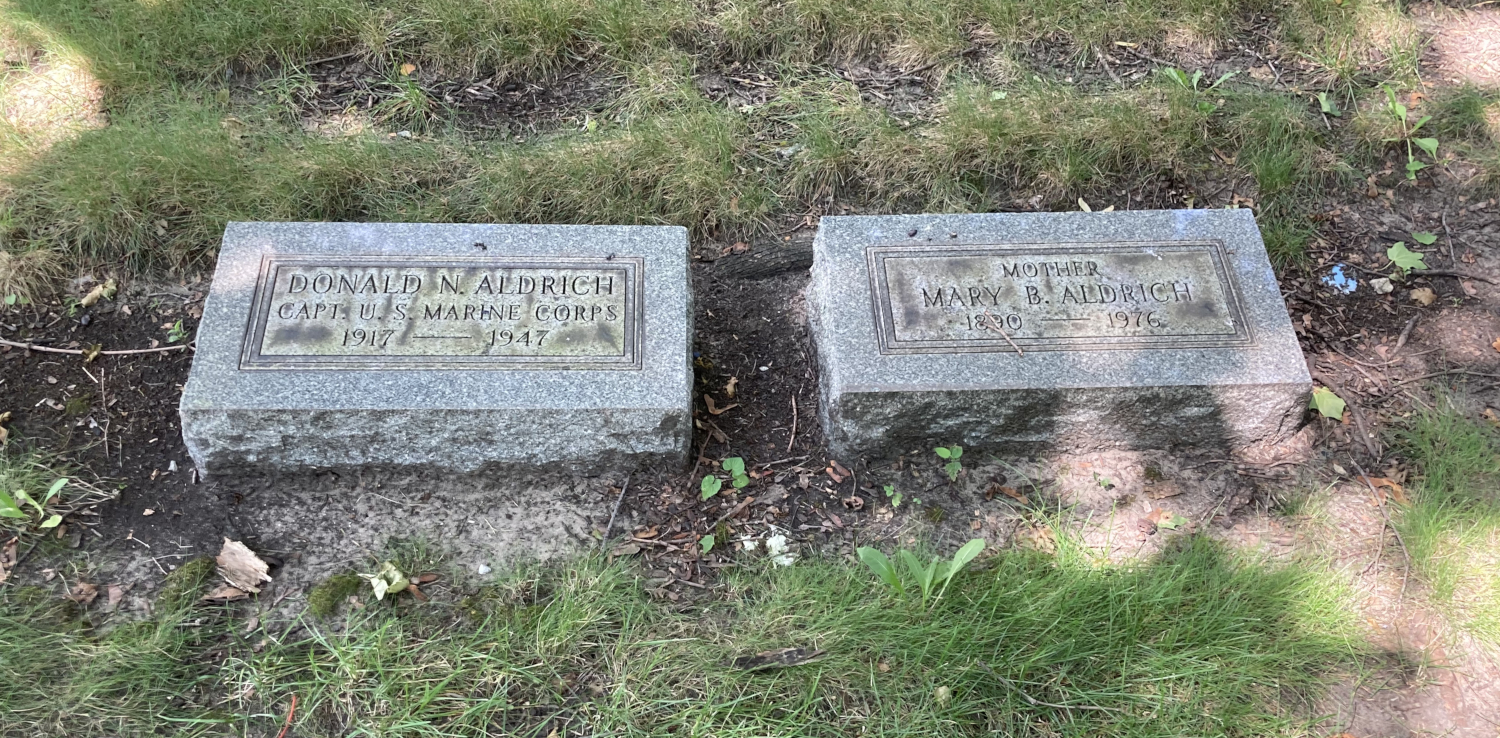
Aldrich's grave at Oak Woods Cemetery

Aldrich continued to serve in the Marine Corps Reserve postwar. He had almost 2,400 hours of flying time by early 1947. Stationed at Marine Corps Air Station Cherry Point, he was temporarily detailed to Quantico for a special training course. On 3 May, Aldrich was given leave to visit his family in Chicago, but encountered engine trouble while en route to Naval Air Station Glenview. He attempted to land at Ashburn Airport, which was closed due to mud. His Corsair flipped over when its wheels touched the ground and Aldrich was killed. He was buried at the Oak Woods Cemetery.

== Military decorations ==
His awards include:

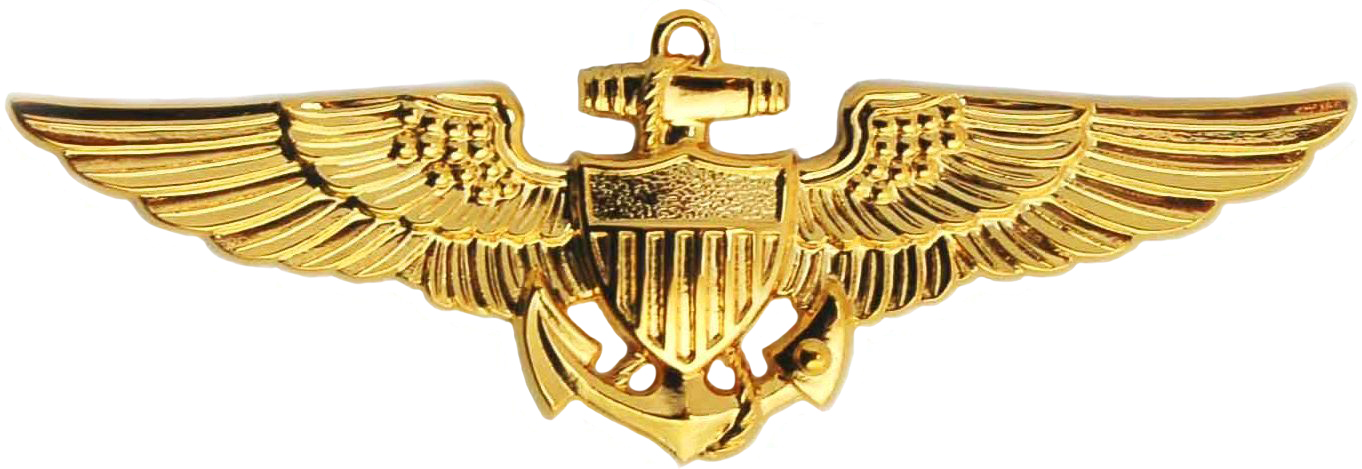

United States Naval Aviator Badge
Navy Cross	Distinguished Flying Cross	Purple Heart w/ 5/16" Gold Star
Air Medal	Navy Presidential Unit Citation	American Campaign Medal
Asiatic-Pacific Campaign Medal w/ one 3/16" silver star and one 3/16" bronze star	World War II Victory Medal	Canadian Volunteer Service Medal

=== Navy Cross citation ===
Citation:

The President of the United States of America takes pleasure in presenting the Navy Cross to Captain Donald Nathan Aldrich (MCSN: 0-11256), United States Marine Corps Reserve, for extraordinary heroism and distinguished service in the line of his profession as Division Leader and a Pilot of Marine Fighting Squadron TWO HUNDRED FIFTEEN (VMF-215), Marine Air Group FOURTEEN (MAG-14), FIRST Marine Aircraft Wing, in aerial combat against enemy Japanese forces in the Solomon Islands and Bismarck Archipelago Areas, from 5 January 1944 to 15 February 1944. Intercepted by vastly superior numbers of enemy aircraft while flying escort for our bombers during strikes over the strongly defended Vunakanau and Lakunai Airfields on 20 and 26 January, Captain Aldrich fought gallantly against tremendous odds, immediately plunging to the attack and destroying four of the hostile planes. Returning from an escort mission deep in enemy territory, he and his wingman observed five Zeros attacking one of the pilots of his formation parachuting from a damaged plane, and hurling themselves at the enemy with a fury that balanced the unequal odds, drove the Zeros away, enabling the pilot to make a safe landing. Disregarding severe personal wounds and damage inflicted on his plane during an escort mission over Tobera Airfield on 28 January, he continued the fierce engagement despite overwhelming aerial opposition and shot four hostile craft from the sky. Destroying a total of fifteen Japanese aircraft during this period of intense aerial operations, he contributed essentially to the protection afforded our bombers and his bold tactics and brilliant combat record reflects the highest credit upon Captain Aldrich and the United States Naval Service.
