= Byron F. Johnson =

U.S. Marine Corps Major General

Byron Fillmore Johnson
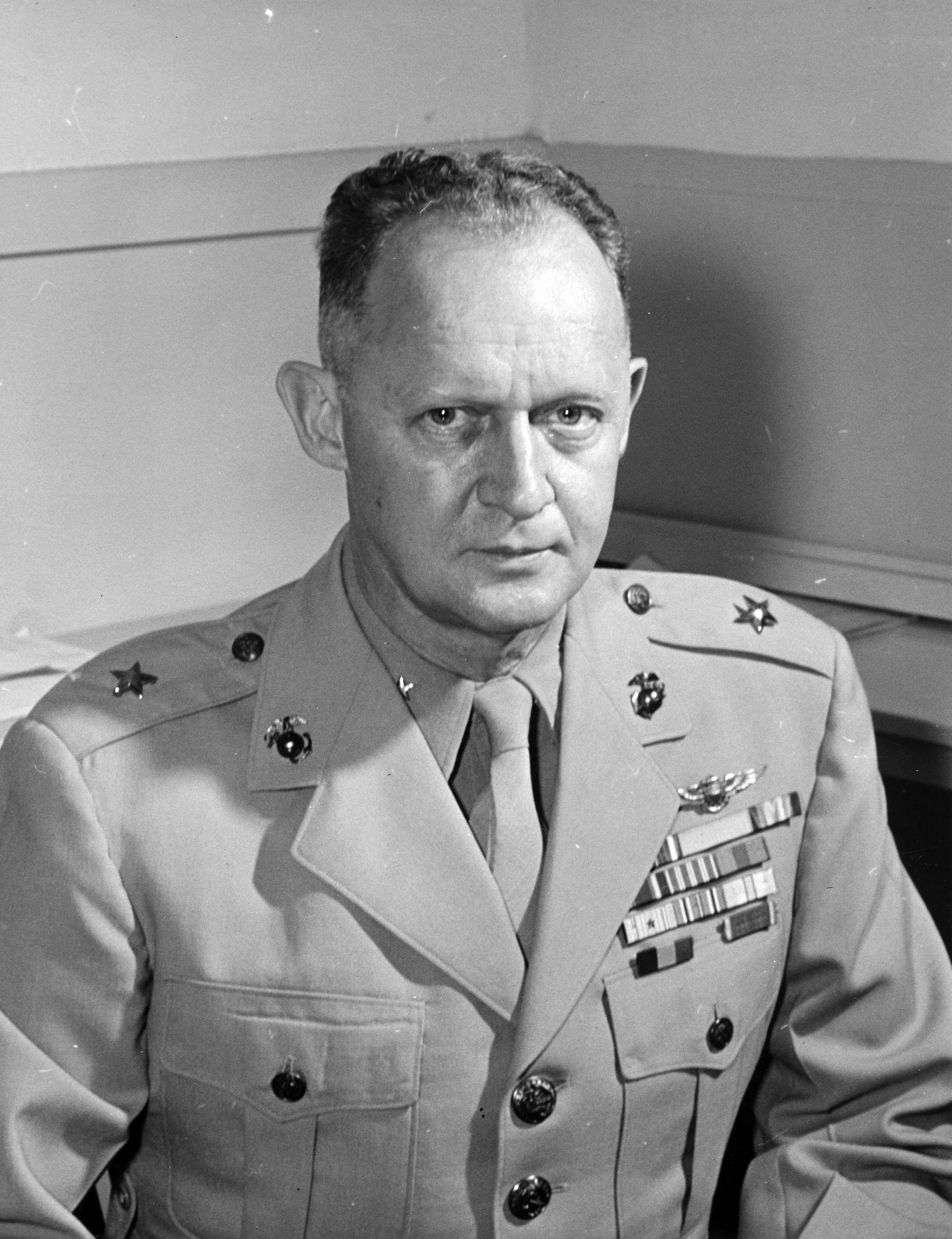
- Johnson as Brigadier general, USMC
- Born: November 15, 1894; Elk Falls, Kansas, US
- Died: April 10, 1980 (aged 85); Coronado, California, US
- Military career
- Allegiance: United States of America
- Branch: United States Marine Corps
- Service years: 1917–1946
- Rank: Major general
- Nickname: "Fil"
- Service number: 0-1801
- Commands: 3rd Marine Aircraft Wing
- Conflicts: World War I Yangtze Patrol; Nicaraguan Campaign; World War II; Chinese Civil War
- Awards: Legion of Merit; Distinguished Flying Cross; Navy and Marine Corps Medal

Byron Fillmore Johnson (November 15, 1894 – April 10, 1980) was a highly decorated officer and Naval aviator in the United States Marine Corps with the rank of major general. A veteran of several conflicts, Johnson distinguished himself in Nicaragua in early 1930s and later participated in the Chinese Civil War in 1945–1946 as assistant wing commander, 1st Marine Aircraft Wing and Air advisor to Generalissimo Chiang Kai-shek.

== Early career ==
Johnson was born on November 15, 1894, in Elk Falls, Kansas, as the son of Charles Gilbert Johnson and Gertrude Ida Blackburn. He completed the high school in Monroe, Louisiana, and subsequently enrolled the University of Minnesota in Minneapolis. His studies were interrupted by the United States entry into World War I in April 1917. Johnson enlisted in the Marine Corps as a private on July 13, 1917, and was ordered to the officer basic training at Marine Barracks Quantico, Virginia.

He completed the training in August 1918 and was commissioned second lieutenant. Johnson then served as an instructor at the Officer Training Camp at Quantico until September 1919, when he was discharged as a first lieutenant to continue his schooling at the University of Minnesota.

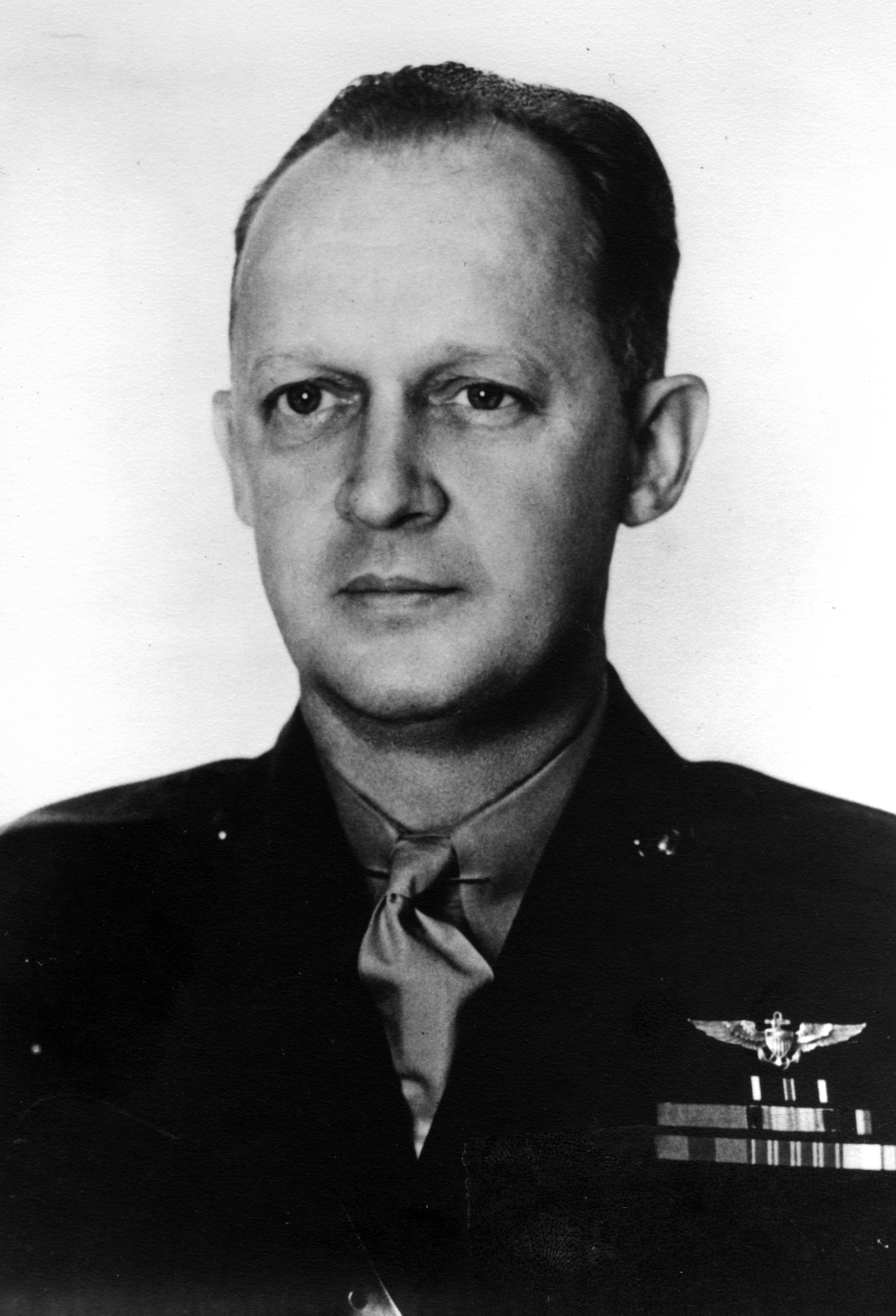
Johnson as Major in late 1930s.

While at the college, Johnson was a member of the varsity basketball squad, captain of the track team and represented the university at the Penn Relays, the Western Conference track meet and the Olympic tryouts. He graduated in June 1920 with a Bachelor of Science degree in civil engineering and returned to the Marine Corps as first lieutenant in June 1921.

Johnson was stationed at the Marine Barracks, Washington, D.C. until June 1923, when he was attached to the Marine detachment aboard the battleship USS Utah. He participated in the Fleet Problem III maneuvers in early 1924 and also participated in a goodwill tour of South America, when Utah sailed with General of the Armies John J. Pershing aboard to Callao, Peru, in December 1924. At the conclusion of Pershing's tour, Utah met him at Montevideo, Uruguay, and then carried him to other ports, including Rio de Janeiro, Brazil, La Guaira, Venezuela, and Havana, Cuba. The tour ultimately ended when Utah returned Pershing to New York on March 13, 1925. Utah conducted midshipman training cruises over the summer of 1925.

He was ordered to the Marine Barracks Quantico, Virginia, and subsequently to the Naval Air Station Lakehurst, New Jersey, for duty as a Balloon Pilot. Johnson remained there until May 1927, when he was attached to the 3rd Marine Brigade under Brigadier General Smedley Butler and ordered for expeditionary duty to China. While there, he served as an aircraft observer and strengthened his interest in aviation.

Johnson returned to the United States in January 1928 and was ordered to the Naval Air Station Pensacola, Florida for flight training. He completed the training in January 1929 and was designated a Naval Aviator. For his first aviation duty, Johnson was ordered to the Naval Air Station North Island, California, where he served as a pilot. While stationed there, he saved civilian M. F. Soner from drowning in summer 1929 and was decorated by the Secretary Andrew Mellon with U.S. Treasury Department Lifesaving Medal in Silver. Johnson was promoted to captain in April 1929.

He sailed for his second tour of expeditionary duty to Nicaragua in April 1930 and participated in the combat flights as a member of Aircraft Squadron, Second Marine Brigade, against Sandino Bandits until summer 1931. Johnson distinguished himself on the morning of June 19, 1930, while in command of a two-plane patrol, encountered and developed a hostile group of bandits, variously estimated at from two hundred to six hundred, on Saraguasa Mountain.

Johnson attacked with bombs and machine gun fire, and though his airplane was struck by six bullets and the leading edge of the lower wind of his plane crushed in by contact with a buzzard, he nevertheless, at great personal risk, over perilous jungle and under constant enemy rifle and machine gun fire, continued the attack until his ammunition was exhausted. Again on the afternoon of the same day he returned in a six plane patrol to the same place, where, though his plane was struck with four bullets, he continued the assault under constant hostile fire for an hour and twenty minutes. As a result of these contacts the bandits suffered many casualties, were forced to retire and organized banditry was dealt a severe and telling blow.

For this act of valor, he was decorated with the Distinguished Flying Cross and also received Nicaraguan Cross of Valor by the Government of Nicaragua. Johnson distinguished himself once again, when participated in the rescue of fellow Marines in April 1931 and received Navy and Marine Corps Medal.

Upon his return in June of that year, Johnson was stationed Quantico, Virginia as Aircraft Squadron Operations Officer until September 1932, when he was ordered for instruction to the Air Corps Tactical School at Maxwell Field, Alabama. He graduated in June 1933 and after brief stint at Quantico, Johnson entered the course at the Army Command and General Staff College at Fort Leavenworth, Kansas.

He completed the course one year later and served at Quantico and was promoted to the rank of major in June 1935. Johnson was transferred to the Headquarters Marine Corps in July 1937. Johnson held additional duty as commanding officer of Marine Air Reserve Unit there until August 1940, when he was ordered to the Naval Air Station North Island, California.

== World War II and Later service ==
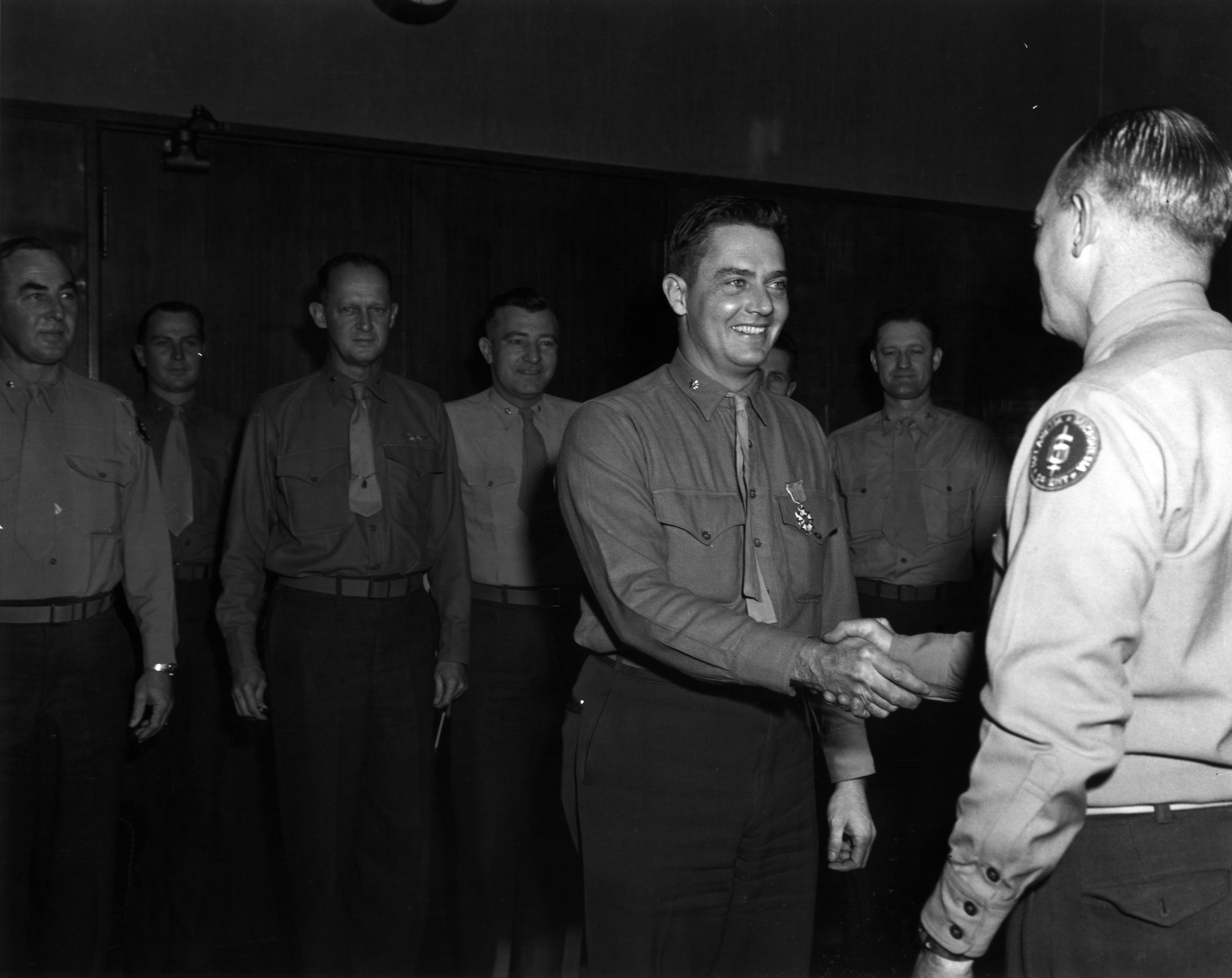
Johnson (3rd from left) during awards ceremony of lieutenant colonel Shaw in China, 1946.

Johnson was ordered to Bogotá, Colombia in January 1941 and served as naval attaché and naval air attaché until March 1944. While in that assignment, he was promoted to colonel in May 1942 and received Order of Boyaca from the Government of Colombia. Following his return to the United States, Johnson served at Marine Corps Air Station Cherry Point, North Carolina until October 1944, when he was ordered to the Hawaii.

He assumed command of 3rd Marine Aircraft Wing at Marine Corps Air Station Ewa and was responsible for the administration and specialized and advanced tactical training of squadrons deploying from the States to combat zones as well as control of Marine aviation units assigned to area garrison forces. While in this capacity, Johnson was promoted to the rank of brigadier general on January 8, 1945.

Johnson was appointed assistant wing commander, 1st Marine Aircraft Wing and deputy to Major General Louis E. Woods and served in this capacity during the occupation of North China with headquarters in Tianjin. He served in this capacity during the Chinese Civil War, when units of 1st Marine Wing participated in the combats against Chinese communists guerillas. Johnson distinguished himself in this capacity and received the Legion of Merit. He also held additional duty as Aviation advisor to Generalissimo Chiang Kai-shek and received Order of the Cloud and Banner for assistance in helping to establish Chinese air units in North China during 1946.

He returned to the United States in March 1946 and assumed duty as assistant to the commanding general, Marine Air, West Coast, William J. Wallace. Johnson remained in that capacity until November 1, 1946, when he retired from active duty and was advanced to the rank of major general on the retired list for having been specially commended in combat.

== Retirement and death ==
Upon his retirement from the Marine Corps, Johnson settled in Coronado, California, where he was appointed to the Planning Commission together with retired Lieutenant General Francis P. Mulcahy. He served in this capacity until early 1950, when he ran for the city council, but was not elected. Johnson was then offered the job of Air Advisor to Generalissimo Chiang Kai-shek, which he accepted and served on Formosa until early 1951.

Johnson then returned to Coronado and served as Chief Air Raid Warden for several years. Major General Byron F. Johnson died on April 10, 1980, and is buried at Cypress View Mausoleum and Crematory in San Diego. He and his wife, Helen Louise Bell Johnson, had two children, Byron Jr. and Doris.

== Decorations ==
Here is the ribbon rack of Major General Johnson:

Naval Aviator Badge
1st Row	Legion of Merit	Distinguished Flying Cross	Navy and Marine Corps Medal	Lifesaving Medal in Silver
2nd Row	World War I Victory Medal	Yangtze Service Medal	Second Nicaraguan Campaign Medal	Marine Corps Expeditionary Medal
3rd Row	American Defense Service Medal with Foreign service clasp	American Campaign Medal	Asiatic-Pacific Campaign Medal	World War II Victory Medal
4th Row	China Service Medal	Nicaraguan Cross of Valor	Colombian Order of Boyaca, Officer	Chinese Order of the Cloud and Banner, 4th Class

=== Distinguished Flying Cross citation ===
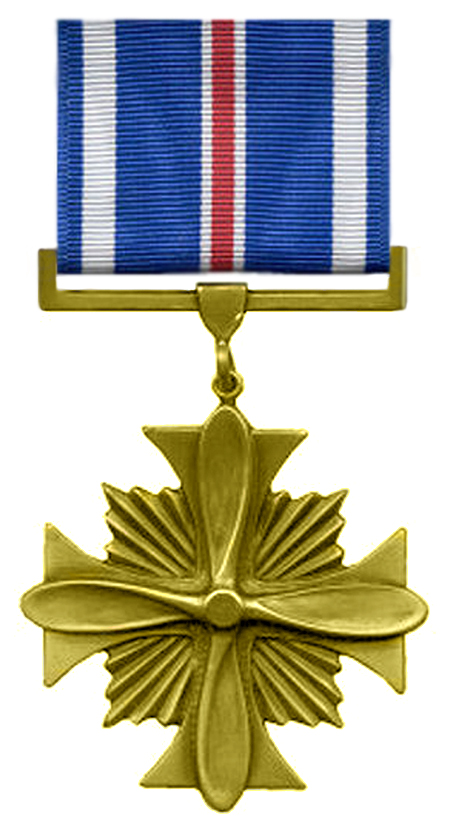

The President of the United States of America takes pleasure in presenting the Distinguished Flying Cross to Captain Byron F. Johnson (MCSN: 0-1801), United States Marine Corps, for extraordinary achievement while participating in aerial flight while attached to the Second Brigade, United States Marine Corps, operating in the Republic of Nicaragua. On the morning of 19 June 1930, Captain Johnson, while in command of a two-plane patrol, encountered and developed a hostile group of bandits, variously estimated at from two hundred to six hundred, under Sandino, on Saraguasa Mountain; with courage, coolness and skill he attacked with bombs and machine gun fire, and though his airplane was struck by six bullets and the leading edge of the lower wind of his plane crushed in by contact with a buzzard, he nevertheless, at great personal risk, over perilous jungle and under constant enemy rifle and machine gun fire, continued the attack until his ammunition was exhausted. Again on the afternoon of the same day he returned in a six plane patrol to the same place, where, though his plane was struck with four bullets, he continued the assault under constant hostile fire for an hour and twenty minutes. As a result of these contacts the bandits suffered many casualties, were forced to retire and organized banditry was dealt a severe and telling blow.

== See also ==
- 3rd Marine Aircraft Wing

Military offices
Preceded by Walter G. Farrell	Commanding General, 3rd Marine Aircraft Wing; November 17, 1944 – August 12, 1945	Succeeded by Lewie G. Merritt
