= Caleb Bailey =

United States Marine Corps general

Caleb Thayer Bailey
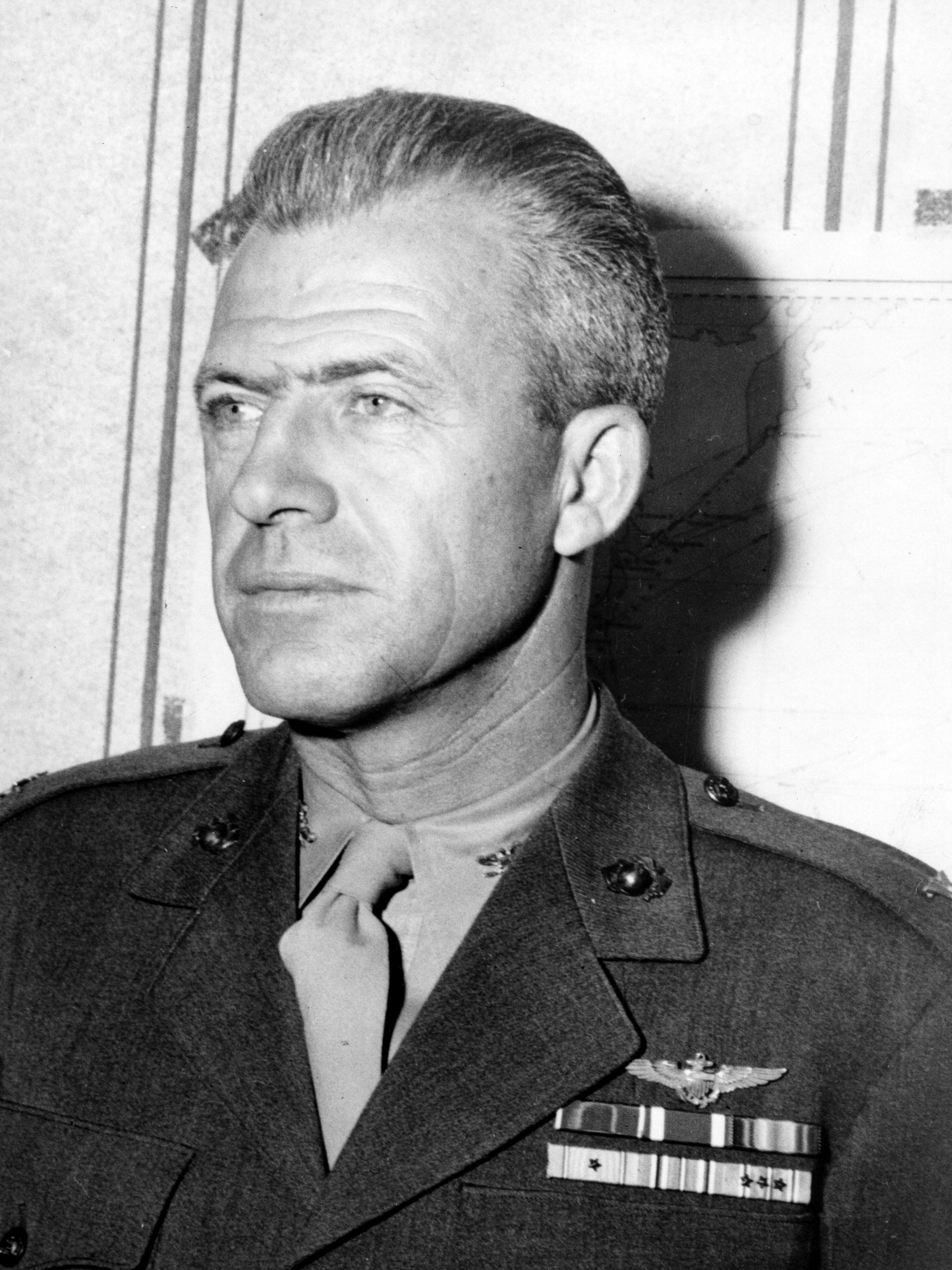
- Colonel Caleb T. Bailey in 1945
- Born: August 28, 1898; Bladensburg, Maryland, US
- Died: January 13, 1957 (aged 58); San Diego, California, US
- Military career
- Allegiance: United States
- Branch: United States Marine Corps
- Service years: 1918-1919; 1923-1954
- Rank: Brigadier general
- Nickname: "Zeke"
- Service number: 0-3871
- Commands: Marine Corps Air Depot Miramar; Marine Aircraft Group 11
- Conflicts: World War I World War II: Bougainville Campaign; Landing on Emirau; Battle of Peleliu; Korean War: Battle of Chosin Reservoir; Hungnam evacuation; Chinese Spring Offensive
- Awards: Legion of Merit (2); Bronze Star Medal; Air Medal (2); Navy Commendation Medal

Caleb Thayer "Zeke" Bailey (August 28, 1898 – January 13, 1957) was a decorated officer and naval aviator in the United States Marine Corps with the rank of brigadier general. An excellent athlete while at the University of Maryland, he distinguished himself as center in the UM Terrapins football team and following his commissioning in the Marine, he also excelled in Quantico Marines Devil Dogs football.

Bailey rose through the ranks and became the first commander of Marine Corps Air Depot Miramar during World War II. He later served successively as chief of staff to the Commander, Aircraft, Northern Solomons, Brigadier general Field Harris, and commander of Marine Aircraft Group 11 during the combats in the Pacific and received several decorations. He later served as chief of staff of the 1st Marine Aircraft Wing during Korean War, before retiring in June 1954.

For his efforts in football, the University of Maryland inducted him to its Athletic Hall of Fame in 1984.

== Early career ==
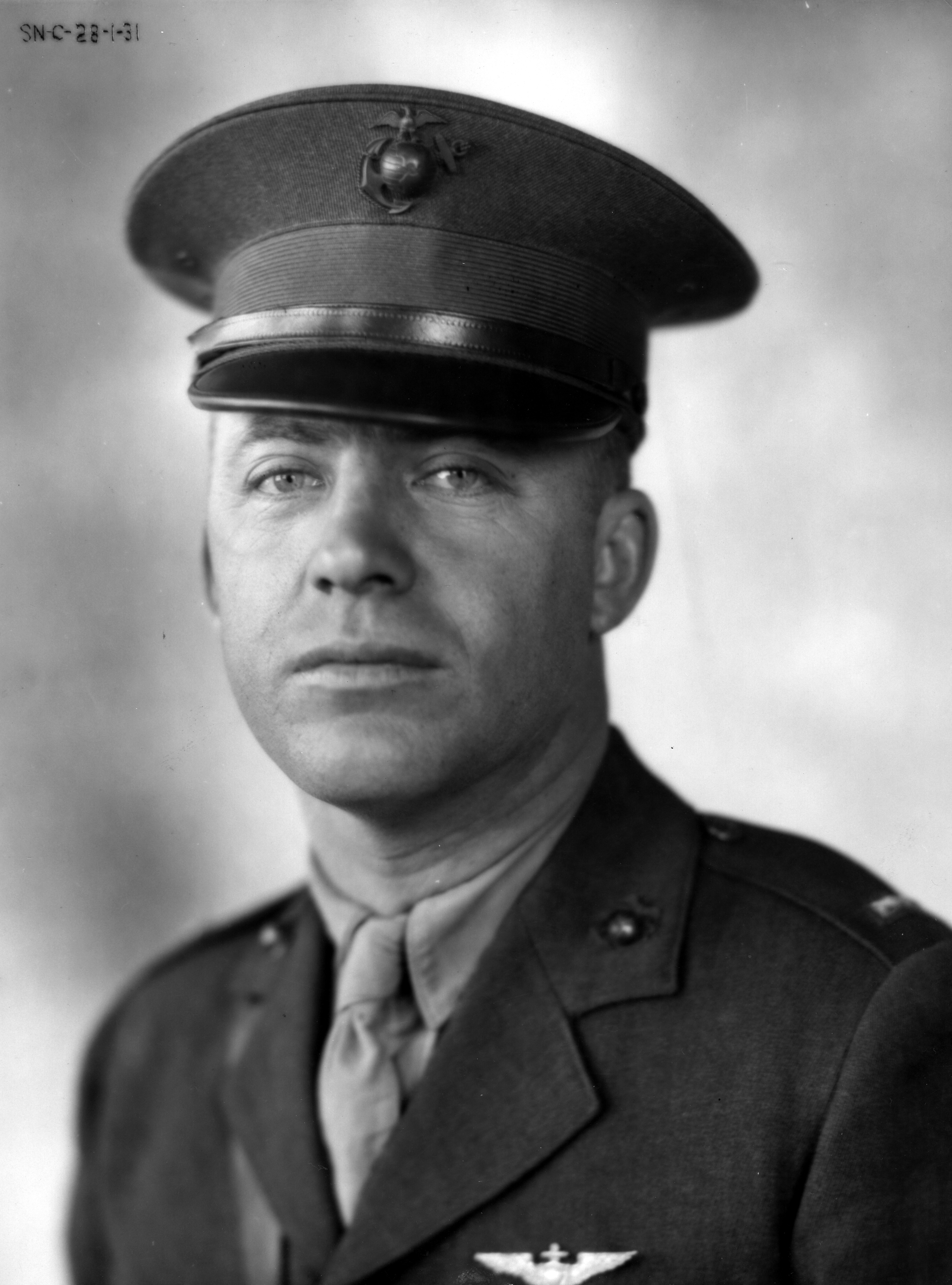
Bailey as 1st lieutenant in January 1931.

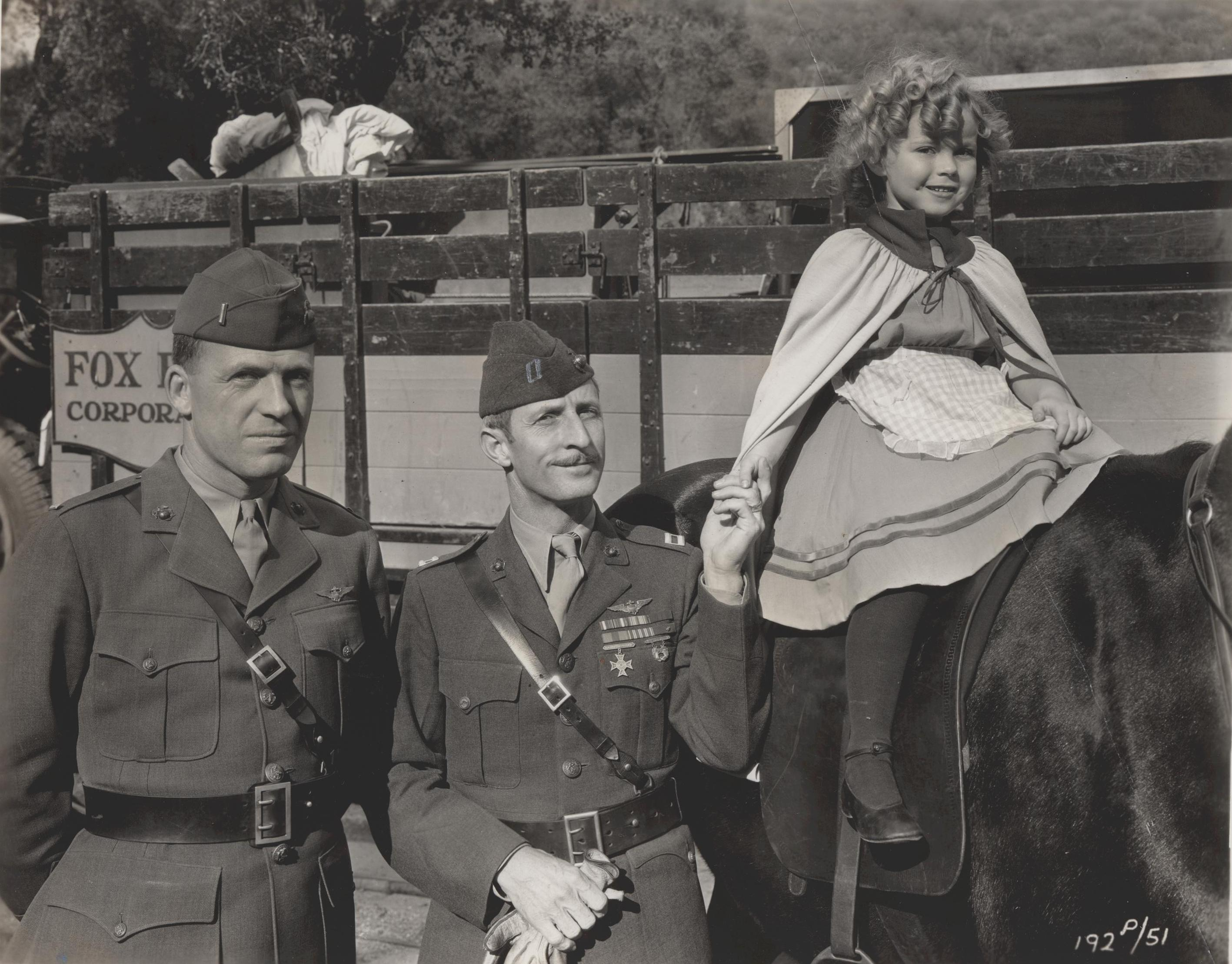
Bailey (left) with Capt. Hayne D. Boyden and Shirley Temple on the Set of The Little Colonel, 1935.

Caleb T. Bailey was born on August 28, 1898, in Bladensburg, Maryland, as the son of vestryman and Justice of the peace Alfred D. Bailey and his wife Mary P. Gordon. He graduated from the Central High School in Washington, D. C. in summer 1917 and began working as Civilian Clerk at the War Department. Bailey enlisted the United States Army in September 1918, but War ended before he could sail overseas.

He then returned to the War Department and worked there until July 1919, when he enrolled the University of Maryland in College Park. While at the college, Bailey became a member of the Beta Kappa chapter of the Kappa Alpha Order and was a regular on the UM Terrapins football team. A dedicated sportsman, he played in the 1921 season while recovering from a broken jaw. The Baltimore Sun wrote in 1922 that Bailey was among those "men whose work can be attributed much of the Black and Gold's success of the last few years." He also played on the Maryland baseball team as a catcher. In May 1923, he tried out for the Newark Bears, a professional baseball team in the International League.

Bailey graduated with Bachelor of Science degree in chemical engineering in June 1923 and was able to secure the commission in the United States Marine Corps. He was commissioned second lieutenant in the Marines on July 17, 1923, and ordered to the Marine Barracks, Quantico for Officers' instruction. Upon the completion of the course, Bailey joined the Quantico Marines Devil Dogs football team as a center and played for next four years with many future distinguished officers including: William J. Whaling, Harry B. Liversedge, Elmer E. Hall, William S. Fellers, Frank B. Goettge, Lawson H. M. Sanderson, George W. McHenry, and Henry Crowe.

After the Marines defeated the Army team from Fort Benning in November 1926, Bailey received the President's Cup from First Lady Grace Coolidge on behalf of his team. Bailey was detached from Quantico in December 1927 and sailed for Haiti, where he participated in the peacekeeping operations as a member of 1st Brigade of Marines.

In September 1928, he returned stateside and rejoined the Quantico Marines as Assistant Coach, a position he held for next two seasons. Bailey was promoted to First lieutenant on December 22, 1928. However, during his tour of duty in Haiti, Bailey became influenced with flying, when he had the opportunity to observe Marine squadrons operating there. He requested for flight training and was ordered to the Naval Air Station Pensacola, Florida, in February 1930.

Bailey successfully completed the training in December that year and was designated Naval aviator. He was ordered to the Naval Air Station North Island in San Diego, California, and joined the Scouting Squadron 14-M there. His squadron was later assigned to the aircraft carrier Saratoga and took part in the fleet exercise in the Caribbean side of the Panama Canal. Bailey served with the squadron aboard Saratoga until July 1934 and participated in the fleet exercises with the Pacific Fleet off Hawaii and the coast of California.

He was subsequently ordered back to Marine Barracks, Quantico, Virginia, and completed Junior Course at the Marine Corps Schools there. Bailey was promoted to Captain in June 1935 and remained at Quantico until May of the following year, when he was ordered to Washington, D.C., for duty at the Bureau of Aeronautics, Navy Department under Rear admiral Arthur B. Cook.

In July 1939, Bailey was promoted to Major and ordered to the Marine Corps Schools, Quantico for Senior course, which he completed in June 1940. He was then ordered to the Marine Corps Air Station at St. Thomas, Virgin Islands, where he served on the staff of the station and also held additional duty as a member of the Municipal Police Commission of St. Thomas and St. John under Governor Charles Harwood.

== World War II ==
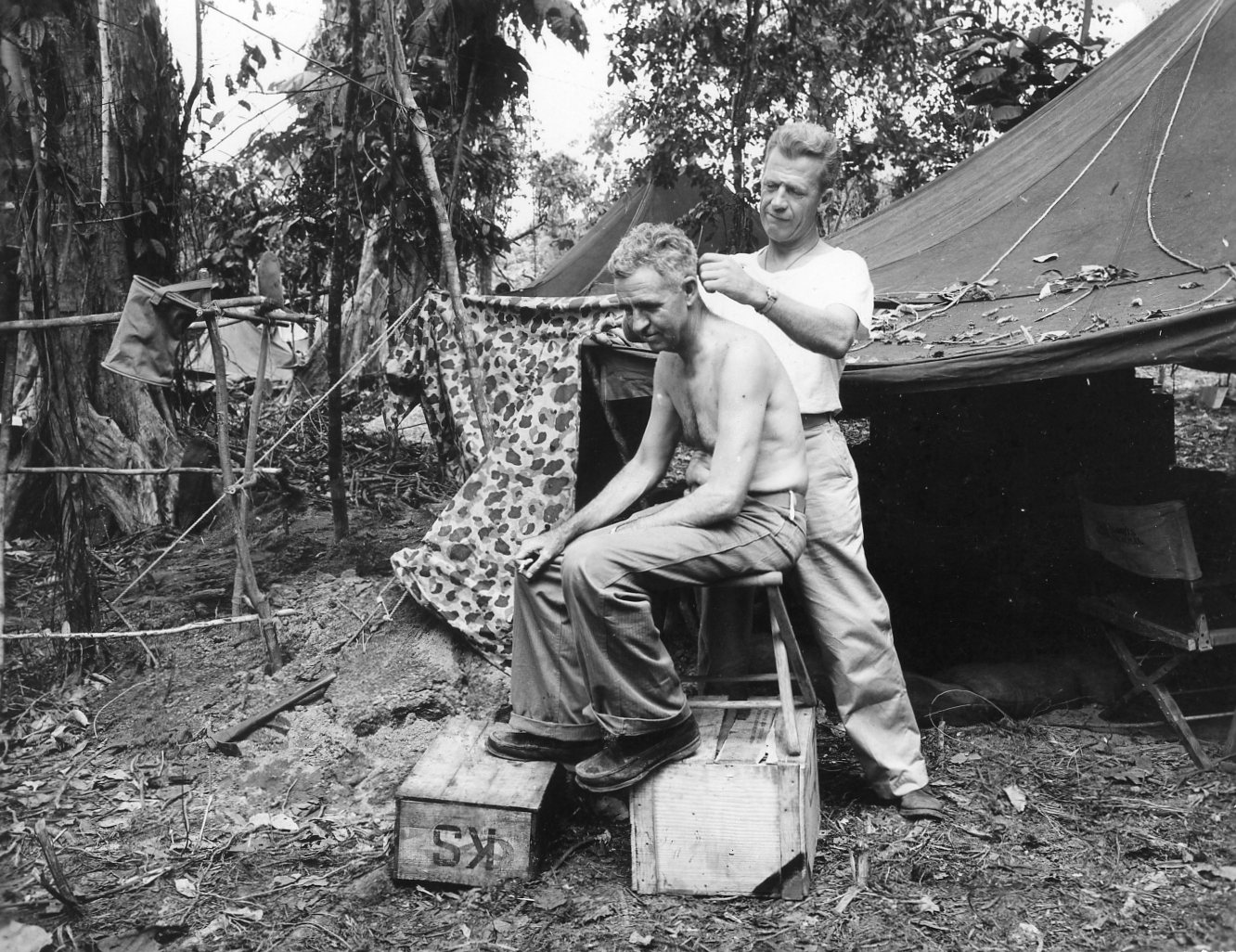
Bailey giving Brigadier General Field Harris a haircut at their headquarters, Bougainville, December 1943.

Following the United States entry into World War II, Bailey was promoted consecutively to the temporary ranks of lieutenant colonel (May 1942) and colonel (October 1942) and returned to the United States by the end of 1942. He was ordered to San Diego, California, and assumed command of Marine Corps Air Depot Miramar. Bailey led its rapid development into one of the most important posts in this area and his base served as the West Coast Depot for Marine Aviation going to combat areas. Beside this duty, he also held additional duty as commander of Marine Aviation Training Squadron 131 stationed there.

In August 1943, Bailey was ordered to South Pacific and assumed duty as chief of staff to the commander, aircraft, Northern Solomons, Brigadier General Field Harris. He joined his new unit on Guadalcanal, where it was stationed for last several months. Bailey then participated in the formulation of the Air Operations plans, supervised the equipping, indoctrination and then embarkation of units of his command for Bougainville Campaign.

On November 1, 1943, Bailey during the landing and movement inland, he established friendly lines and under his supervision, all of the following services were functioning by 1830, D-Day: Air Warning Service (including radar telling); Fighter Direction Service; Close Support Bomber Control; Communications with ComAirSols; and Communications with Divisional Headquarters. For his service during the preparation of his command and during the attack on Bougainville, Bailey was decorated with Legion of Merit with Combat "V".

In March 1944, Bailey participated in the Landing on Emirau, where he then helped to establish an U.S. airbase and received Navy Commendation Medal for his service. Upon the departure of general Field Harris to the United States in August 1944, Bailey assumed command of Marine Aircraft Group 11 and led his unit during the Battle of Peleliu in September–November 1944. His group provided close air support to the 81st Infantry Division and 1st Marine Division during the War in the Pacific.

He then established his headquarters on that island and held additional duty as Air Defense Commander, Peleliu. For the rest of the year, Bailey's planes flew routine antisubmarine and combat air patrols, and bombing and rocket missions over other Palau Islands (Koror and Babelthuap) and over Yap. Three Japanese Aichi E13A "Jake" planes were destroyed during that period and Bailey received Bronze Star Medal with Combat "V" and Air Medal for his service at Peleliu.

While group commander of MAG-11 at Peleliu, his pilots of VMF-122 began what they called "Operation Freeze". In these missions, a single F4U Corsair flew at 30,000 to 33,000 feet under the guise of practicing high-altitude operations, which also had the side benefits of drawing ineffective Japanese anti-aircraft artillery fire (thereby wasting their ammunition stores), and creating ten gallons of chocolate ice cream. The field-expedient dessert was made from a concoction of canned milk and cocoa powder stored in an underwing tank, which froze during flight at the high altitude. According to the book Corsair: The F4U in World War II and Korea, Bailey called the unit regarding the "practice" sorties and told them, "You guys aren't fooling me, I've got spies. You tell Hunter I'm coming over there tomorrow and get my ration."

Bailey was succeeded by Colonel Clarence J. Chappell in January 1945 and returned to the United States for duty on the staff of Marine Air, West Coast under Major general Claude A. Larkin. He remained in that capacity for the remainder of the War.

== Postwar service ==
Following the war, Bailey remained in the Marine Corps serving as the chief of staff of Marine Corps Air Station Cherry Point, North Carolina, under Brigadier General Ivan W. Miller. In this capacity, he was co-responsible for the training of replacement air crews and other personnel.

In November 1950, his former superior officer, now Major General Field Harris, and commanding general of the 1st Marine Aircraft Wing in Korea, requested Bailey to be his chief of staff. He succeeded Colonel Kenneth H. Weir and took part in the Battle of Chosin Reservoir. During the subsequent Hungnam evacuation, Bailey was responsible for supervising and coordinating the activities of the Wing's staff and was later charged with supervising the construction of K-1 Airfield and the design of Wing facilities at that field.

During the first part of 1951, Bailey took part in the planning and execution of Wing's air operations during the Chinese Spring Offensive and remained in Korea until the end of August 1951. For his service with 1st Marine Aircraft Wing, Bailey was decorated with his second Legion of Merit with Combat "V" and second Air Medal.

Upon his return stateside, Bailey remained on active duty until June 30, 1954, when he retired after 31 years of commissioned service. He was advanced to the rank of brigadier general on the retired list for having been specially commended in combat.

== Death ==
Bailey then settled with his wife in La Jolla, California, and died at Naval Hospital, San Diego following a long illness on January 13, 1957, aged 58. He was buried with full military honors at Fort Rosecrans National Cemetery, California, with his wife Ann Mathis Bailey (1911–1985) beside him. They had one son, Charles Bailey.

== Decorations ==
Brigadier general Bailey's personal decorations include:

Naval Aviator Badge
1st Row	Legion of Merit with one 5/16" Gold Star and Combat "V"		
2nd Row	Bronze Star Medal with Combat "V"	Air Medal with one 5/16" Gold Star	Navy Commendation Medal
3rd Row	Navy Presidential Unit Citation with one star	World War I Victory Medal	American Defense Service Medal with Base Clasp
4th Row	American Campaign Medal	Asiatic-Pacific Campaign Medal with three 3/16 inch service stars	World War II Victory Medal
5th Row	National Defense Service Medal	Korean Service Medal with three 3/16 inch service stars	United Nations Korea Medal

== Honors ==
The University of Maryland Athletic Hall of Fame inducted him in 1984.
