= Marine Aviation Logistics Squadron 11 =

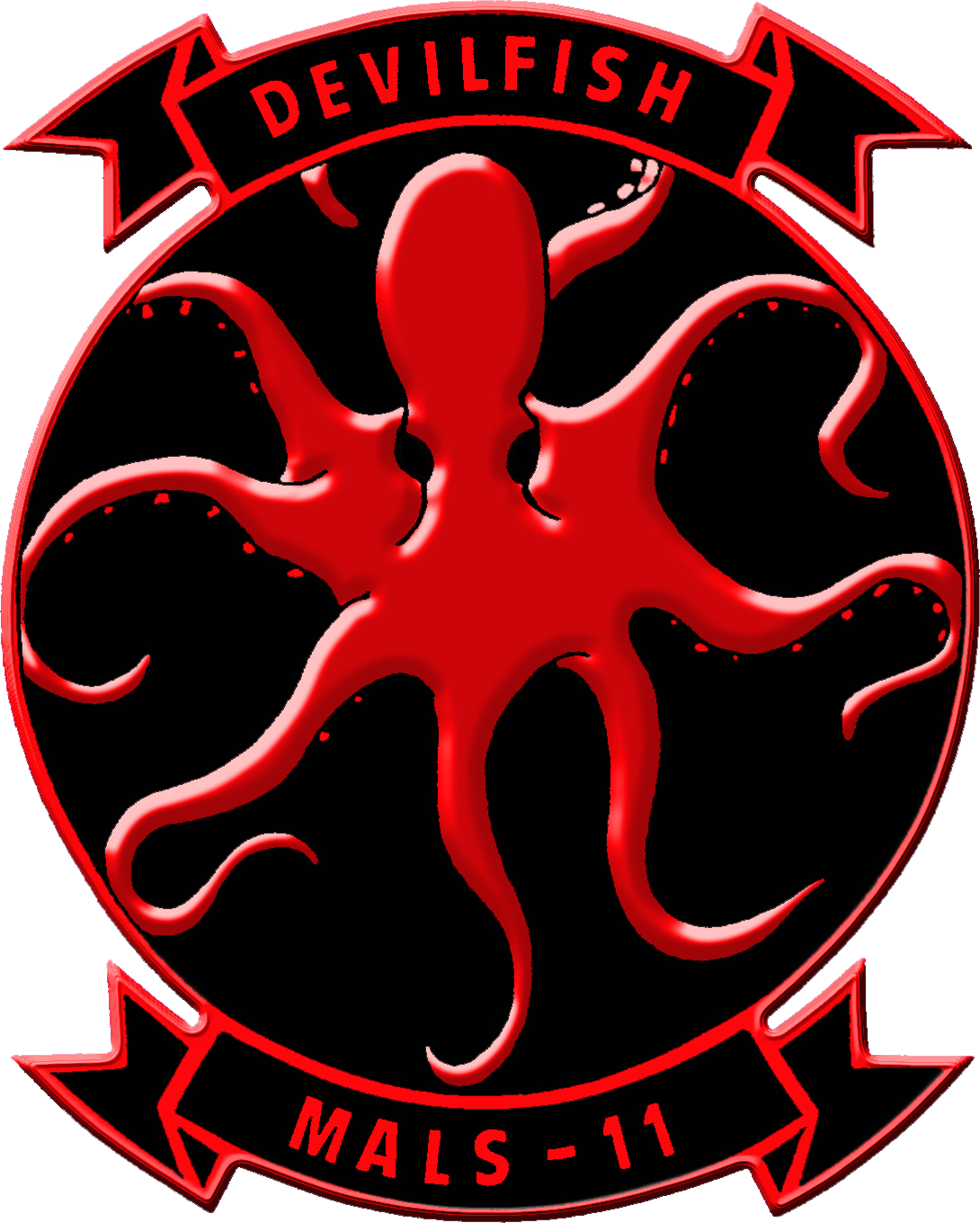
- MALS-11 insignia
- Active: December 1921
- Country: United States
- Allegiance: United States of America
- Branch: United States Marine Corps
- Type: Logistics
- Role: Aviation logistics support
- Part of: Marine Aircraft Group 11; 3rd Marine Aircraft Wing
- Garrison/HQ: Marine Corps Air Station Miramar
- Nickname: "Devilfish"
- Engagements: World War II; Korean War; Vietnam War; Operation Desert Storm; Operation Iraqi Freedom; Operation Enduring Freedom

Commanders
- Current commander: LtCol Alexander Monte

Marine Aviation Logistics Squadron 11 (MALS-11) is an aviation logistics support unit of the United States Marine Corps, part of Marine Aircraft Group 11 (MAG-11), currently based at Marine Corps Air Station Miramar and also part of the 3rd Marine Aircraft Wing.

== History ==
=== Early years ===
The unit was activated in December 1921, as Flight 1, 2nd Air Squadron, Marine Flying Field, Marine Barracks, Quantico, Virginia. On 24 August 1922, Flight 1 was redesignated as Division 3, VO Squadron 3, First Aviation Group.

On 1 September 1924, Division 3 became Service Squadron, First Aviation Group. On 1 March 1929, the unit was again redesignated and remained Aviation Service Company 1, Aircraft Squadrons, East Coast Expeditionary Force until 18 January 1934, when it was redesignated Headquarters and Service Battalion 1, 1st Marine Aircraft Group, Fleet Marine Forces.

=== World War II ===
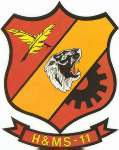
H&MS-11 insignia

On 1 September 1941, the unit was redesignated as Headquarters and Service Squadron 11, Marine Aircraft Group 11, 1st Marine Aircraft Wing. The unit's designation was changed on 1 February 1944 to Headquarters Squadron 11, Marine Aircraft Group 11, Marine Air South Pacific.

During World War II, Headquarters Squadron 11 participated in campaigns in the Solomon Islands, New Britain, Peleliu, Central Pacific, and Philippines Islands campaign. On 15 February 1954, the unit was redesignated Headquarters and Maintenance Squadron 11 (H&MS-11).

=== Vietnam War ===
On 7 July 1965 H&MS-11 relocated to Da Nang Air Base, Vietnam where they supported the first attacks by Marine aircraft against Viet Cong forces. During their time in Vietnam the squadron supported 12 different aircraft types including providing support to aircraft from Task Force 77 operating off Yankee Station. H&MS-11 departed the Republic of Vietnam 1 June 1971 and joined the 3rd Marine Aircraft Wing at Marine Corps Air Station El Toro, California.

=== Persian Gulf War & the 1990s ===
On 5 October 1988, the squadron was redesignated Marine Aviation Logistics Squadron 11. During August 1990, MALS-11 deployed to Southwest Asia where the squadron supported Operation Desert Shield and Operation Desert Storm. MALS-11 was awarded the Secretary of Defense Award for Maintenance Excellence for July 1991 through July 1992, and was again the Marine Corps' nominee in 1995, 1999 and 2000. On 1 July 1996, MALS-11 moved to MCAS Miramar in support of MAG-11.

=== Global War on Terror ===
During 2002 and 2003, MALS-11 deployed to Kuwait in support of Operation Southern Watch, Operation Enduring Freedom and Operation Iraqi Freedom.

In March 2004, MALS-11 was the recipient of the 2003 Marine Corps Aviation Association Marion Carl Award.

In 2009, MALS-11 was recognized as the Naval Aviation Enterprise AIRSpeed site of the year and also received the Marine Corps Aviation Association Col Don Davis award as best Aviation Logistics squadron of the year.

== See also ==
- United States Marine Corps Aviation
- Organization of the United States Marine Corps
- List of United States Marine Corps aviation support units
