= VMF-422 =

Marine Fighting Squadron 422
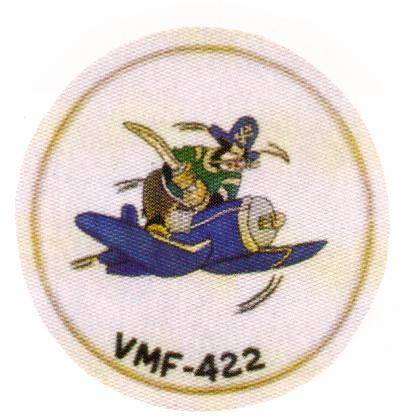
- VMF-422 Insignia
- Active: 1 January 1943 – 7 April 1947
- Country: United States
- Branch: USMC
- Type: Fighter squadron
- Role: Air interdiction
- Part of: Inactive
- Nickname(s): Flying Buccaneers
- Engagements: World War II * Marshall Islands Campaign * Battle of Okinawa

Aircraft flown
- Fighter: Vought F4U Corsair

Marine Fighting Squadron 422 (VMF-422) was a Vought F4U Corsair squadron in the United States Marine Corps. The squadron, also known as the "Flying Buccaneers", fought in World War II but is perhaps best known for its role in the worst accident in naval aviation history when 22 of the squadron's 23 aircraft were lost flying through a typhoon on 25 January 1944. After being reconstituted, the squadron participated in the Battle of Okinawa. VMF-422 was decommissioned on 7 April 1947. Since that date, no other Marine Corps squadron has carried the lineage and honors of VMF-422.

== Unit history ==
Marine Fighter Squadron (VMF-422) was commissioned on 1 January 1943, at Naval Air Station San Diego. The squadron's commissioning came at the behest of Order No. 062354, from Commander Air Wing, Pacific issued in December 1942. On 27 January, VMF-422 moved to Marine Corps Air Station Santa Barbara under the command of Major John S. MacLaughlin Jr. to begin training together as a squadron. Initially the roster consisted of forty pilots and 120 enlisted men. Three pilots, Captains Cloyd Rex Jeans, Charles Hughes and John Rogers were veterans of combat in the Pacific, all having served in other VMF units from Midway to Guadalcanal.

Most of the pilots were new, having earned their wings in 1943 from either Naval Air Station Pensacola or Naval Air Station Jacksonville. These pilots completed Carrier Qualification Training (CQT) at Naval Air Station Chicago aboard either the USS Sable (IX-81)] or USS Wolverine (IX-64). For the most part the pilots flew North American SNJ trainers or six FM1 Wildcats until late August when they were transported to Naval Air Station North Island, San Diego to take delivery of twenty-four new Vought F4U-1D Corsairs. They participated in gunnery and bombing training at the Naval Air Weapons Station China Lake in the Mojave Desert.

The squadron was declared operational on 24 September 1943, and ordered to San Diego, where the lead echelon of twenty-four pilots and planes would be loaded aboard the new Essex-class carrier USS Bunker Hill (CV-17) for transport to Pearl Harbor, arriving on 3 October.

After arrival, the squadron was initially based out of Marine Corps Air Station Ewa on Oahu, however the squadron's lead echelon, was sent by transport to Midway Atoll for advanced air patrol training with Marine Aircraft Group 22 (MAG-22). There the squadron suffered its first casualties when First Lieutenants Stafford Drake and Edmund Farrell were killed in a mid-air collision with First Lieutenant William Aycrigg. Only Aycrigg survived. The deceased pilots were replaced by pilots from the rear echelon. Upon returning to Oahu on 15 December, the squadron was issued twenty-four new F4U-1D Corsairs.

They received orders to board the escort carrier USS Kalinin Bay (CVE-68) just after the New Year. Their destination was Hawkins Field on the island of Betio in Tarawa Atoll in the recently captured Gilbert Islands. Arriving on the early morning of 24 January, VMF-422 catapulted off the ship to fly to Hawkins Field. Major MacLaughlin was met by the chief of staff of the Fourth Marine Base Defense Air Wing (4th MBDAW) Colonel Lawrence Burke, who informed him that VMF-422 was to fly to the island of Funafuti, 820 miles to the southeast to await their role in Operation Flintlock, the invasion of the Marshall Islands, scheduled for 3 February. Maj. MacLaughlin was provided with weather, navigational and radio code information for the flight. An escort plane was standard Navy policy for single-engine fighters going on long, over-water flights. But despite having formally requested a multi-engine navigational escort plane from the Fourth MBDAW commander, Brigadier General Lewie G. Merritt, MacLaughlin and his pilots were told to make the flight alone. In addition, MacLaughlin was not told that the weather report, which forecast scattered clouds and rain showers down to their destination, was more than twenty-six hours old. Some of the radio call signs and navigational radio range frequencies were incorrect as well.

== Doomed flight ==
Shortly before 1000 hrs. twenty-three F4U-1D Corsairs took off from Hawkins Field. One of the squadron's aircraft, flown by Lieutenant Robert Scott, had starter trouble and was unable to leave.

The remaining Corsairs, which carried enough fuel to last until about 1600 hrs., flew south along the chain of Gilbert and Ellice Islands, headed for their first stop, Nanumea Airfield, the home base of the United States Army Air Forces 30th Bomb Group (Heavy). Nanumea was located approximately halfway along the route to Funafuti. But due to a procedural error among the air operations staff at Hawkins Field, neither Nanumea nor Funafuti had been informed of VMF-422's imminent arrival.

At 1230 hrs., still short of Nanumea, the squadron encountered a massive Pacific cyclone measuring nearly 150 miles (240 km) in diameter and reaching to more than 50,000 feet (15,000 m). Having little choice, the pilots flew into the storm and were immediately blown far to the south and east by the clockwise rotation of the cyclone, which carried them beyond Nanumea. The base had its radar up and running but with no information that a Marine squadron was in the air, did not attempt to make contact. By the time the scattered Corsairs broke out of the first storm front nearly twenty minutes later they were already more than fifty miles (80 km) past Nanumea. In an attempt to find the Nanumea radio range beacon, Major MacLaughlin made two radical course changes that further broke apart the formation. Five pilots, Captain John Rogers, Lieutenants John Hansen, Don Walker, Robert Moran, Walter Wilson and Earl Thompson were missing. Lieutenant Christian Lauesen had engine trouble and was forced to ditch in the heaving seas. Against orders, Lieutenant Robert Lehnert chose to stay behind and circle the downed pilot while making continual efforts to contact a base. Walker soon rejoined the rest of the pilots, but the other four were still unaccounted for. The remaining pilots continued south, hoping to reach Funafuti.

Another storm front swallowed them and at last, MacLaughlin agreed to turn back and try to find either Nanumea or Nui, which was closest to their estimated location. But when they reached the area, Major MacLaughlin was not among them. The last men to see him alive, as he was making desperate attempts to use his radio, were Lieutenants John Lincoln and Jules Flood.

The squadron was now under the command of Captain Cloyd Jeans. He decided that with fuel running low, they should stay together and ditch as one group. Meanwhile, Wilson had miraculously ditched on Niutao, east of Nanumea, and Moran had made brief radio contact with both Nanumea and Jeans. He parachuted over Nui, but due to injuries in the bail-out, died in the surf. Hansen was the only one of the pilots who managed to get a fix on the Funafuti radio range and landed safely. His unexpected arrival was the first indication to the Navy that a Marine squadron was missing at sea. Jeans and fourteen other pilots ditched as the storm drew closer. Two pilots, Lieutenants Bill Aycrigg and Ted Thurnau were too far away to be reached by raft.

Lehnert, who had parachuted over the swimming Lauesen at the height of the storm when his own fuel ran out, was unable to find the other man. He spent the next three days alone on his raft until being found by a Consolidated PBY Catalina from Patrol Squadron 53 (VP-53) on the early afternoon of 28 January.

The other thirteen downed pilots managed to survive three days of heavy wind-whipped seas, severe exposure and sharks until the afternoon of 28 January. A PBY Catalina out of Funafuti, piloted by Ensign George Davidson found the tiny band of rafts 143 miles (230 km) southwest of Funafuti. They had drifted more than two hundred miles (320 km). The landing damaged the flying boat and only by heroic efforts was the plane kept afloat until they were picked up by the destroyer USS Hobby (DD-610). A day later Thurnau was rescued by the destroyer USS Welles (DD-628). MacLaughlin, Rogers, Thompson, Lauesen and Aycrigg were never found.

In all, six pilots died and twenty-two planes were lost. It was the worst non-combat loss of a Marine squadron in the war.

== Investigation ==
A Navy Board of Inquiry was ordered by Rear Admiral John Hoover, commander of Task Group 50.2, which had jurisdiction over Marine air operations in the area. From 27 January to 10 February, eighteen witnesses were called to the wardroom of the USS Curtiss (AV-4) in Tarawa Lagoon. The board concluded that the leading cause was the denial of an escort by the Fourth MBDAW commander, General Merritt. It also concluded that proper procedures for air operations on Tarawa had not been followed. These factors, along with an outdated weather report, contributed to the loss.

The findings and recommendations went up the chain of command to Commander in Chief U.S. Pacific Fleet (CINCPAC) Admiral Chester W. Nimitz to Chief of Naval Operations Admiral Ernest J. King and on to James Forrestal, Undersecretary of the Navy at The Pentagon. The recommendations were endorsed at each level which resulted in letters of censure for several officers, including General Merritt. But likely due to his political connections, Merritt was able to stay clear of any association with the loss of six pilots. However, the Navy did take steps to assure that no single-engine plane or unit was unescorted on an over-water flight. By order of CINCPAC, escort planes were official Navy policy for single-engine fighters ferrying long distance over water. The pilots who had survived the disaster had been sent back to the states in December for assignment to other squadrons. Few had ever known what had been the real cause of the loss of six of their number. The six men lost were officially declared dead by the Navy Department on 25 January 1945. Despite inquiries by relatives, there had never been an official explanation as to the cause of the disaster. John MacLaughlin was posthumously given the rank of lieutenant colonel.

== Reconstitution, combat and decommissioning ==
VMF-422 was reconstituted after the disaster under the command of Major Elmer Wrenn with Captain Jeans remaining as the executive officer. The remnants of the squadron were sent to Engebi in Eniwetok Atoll on 19 February. The surviving pilots and new replacements arrived in March and a short period of additional training took place over the next few weeks. Among the new replacement pilots was Captain Jefferson J. DeBlanc, a well-known Marine flying ace who had been credited with eight aerial victories over the Solomon Islands while flying with VMF-112. On 27 May, a portion of the squadron was sent to Roi-Namur to conduct interdiction missions against Japanese bases and shipping in the Marshall Islands. During this period, the Flying Buccaneers hosted Charles Lindbergh in September 1944 and he also accompanied them on three strike missions against Wotje Atoll. The VMF-422 echelon remained on Roi-Namur until 16 October when the squadron was reunited back on Engebi to begin missions against Ponape.

On 26 April 1945, VMF-422 departed the Central Pacific bound for Okinawa. The ground crew arrived at Ie Shima on 7 May with the aircraft in trace by an additional couple of weeks. During its first combat flights over Okinawa on 25 May, the squadron was credited with shooting down five Japanese aircraft. On 29 June, Capt DeBlanc led a large formation of Corsairs from multiple squadrons against targets on Ishigaki Island. En route to the target four of the formation's Corsairs exploded in the sky because bomb safety wires had worked loose, thus arming the bombs in flight. The squadron lost ten aircraft during the Battle of Okinawa. During the entirety of the Okinawa Campaign the squadron was credited with 15 Japanese planes shot down.

After the war, VMF-422 returned to the United States in November 1945 and was assigned to MAG-22 at MCAS El Toro. At some point the squadron was transferred to Marine Corps Air Station Cherry Point, North Carolina where it was decommissioned on 30 April 1947.

== See also ==
- United States Marine Corps Aviation
- List of active United States Marine Corps aircraft squadrons
- List of decommissioned United States Marine Corps aircraft squadrons
