= Lawson H. M. Sanderson =

United States Marine Corps general

Lawson Harry McPhearson Sanderson
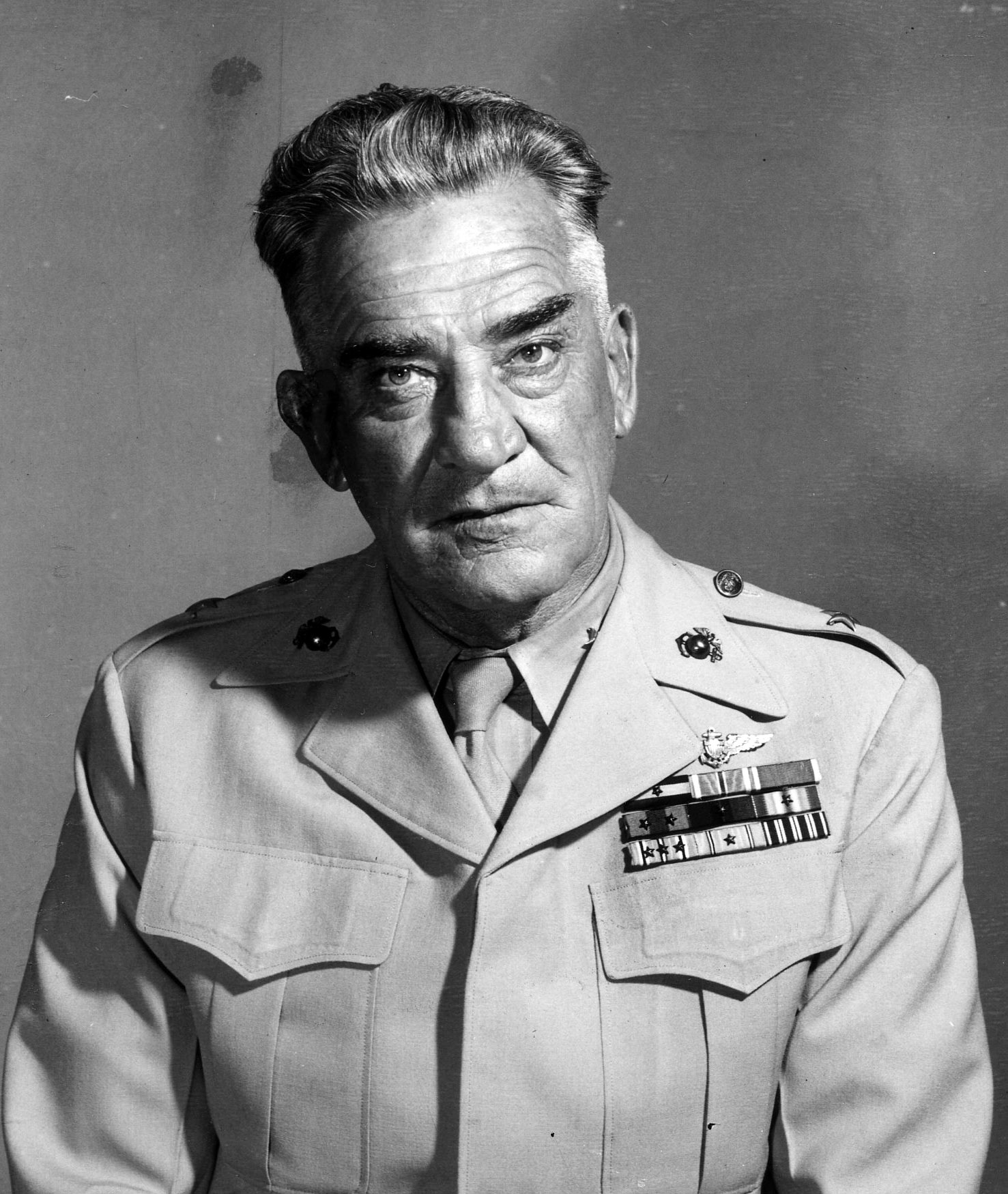
- Sanderson as brigadier general, USMC.
- Born: July 22, 1895; Shelton, Washington, US
- Died: June 11, 1973 (aged 77); San Diego, California, US
- Burial place: Arlington National Cemetery
- Military career
- Allegiance: United States of America
- Branch: United States Marine Corps
- Service years: 1917–1951
- Rank: Major general
- Nickname: "Sandy"
- Service number: 0-860
- Commands: Marine Air, West Coast; 4th Marine Aircraft Wing; 1st Marine Aircraft Wing; Marine Aircraft Group 11; Marine Aircraft Group 42
- Conflicts: World War I Banana Wars: Haitian Campaign; Nicaraguan Campaign; World War II: Guadalcanal campaign; Solomon Islands campaign
- Awards: Legion of Merit; Distinguished Flying Cross

Lawson Harry McPhearson Sanderson (July 22, 1895 – June 11, 1973) was an aviation pioneer of the United States Marine Corps with the rank of major general. He is most noted for his effort in development of the dive bombing technique. As commanding officer of the 4th Marine Aircraft Wing, Sanderson accepted the Japanese surrender of Wake Island at the end of World War II.

== Early career ==
He was born on July 22, 1895, in Shelton, Washington, as the son of game warden Lewis Sanderson (1857–1941), and his wife Ruby (1861–1956). After attending the local high school, Sanderson enrolled at the University of Washington and subsequently at the University of Montana in Missoula, Montana, where he graduated with a Bachelor of Arts degree in 1917. He then enlisted in the United States Marine Corps on September 19, 1917, and subsequently served as drill instructor with the rank of gunnery sergeant. Sanderson requested aviation training and was sent for instruction to Aviation Ground School at Cambridge, Massachusetts. He was subsequently assigned to the Marine Flying Field Miami, Florida, in May 1918 and completed his aviation training at the beginning of January 1919.

Sanderson was transferred to the Marine Corps Reserve Flying Corps and designated Naval Aviator on 14 January 1919. He was also appointed second lieutenant (provisional) on the same date. Sanderson subsequently served as flight instructor at Miami Field and then participated in submarine patrols off the coast of Florida and Cuba.

=== Dive bombing ===
When the situation on Haiti escalated, Sanderson was transferred to the Squadron "E" attached to the 1st Provisional Brigade of Marines and sailed for Haiti aboard the troopship USS Kittery on March 15, 1919. He arrived at Port-au-Prince at the end of March.

During one of the skirmishes with "Cacos" bandits, Sanderson flying the Curtiss JN-4 plane was ordered to attack a group of bandits near the old stone French fort, but his squadron had not received requested bomb racks. Sanderson improvised canvas mail sacks instead of bomb racks. He subsequently dropped light bombs from a shallow dive on the enemy and was successful in completing the mission. Although Sanderson called it "Glide bombing", it helped develop the later dive bombing technique.

== Further interwar service ==
Sanderson returned to the United States in March 1920 and was assigned for instruction at Officers Training School within Quantico Base, Virginia. He graduated one year later and was subsequently selected for special flight with De Havilland 4A plane from Washington, D.C. to Santo Domingo. Sandy set a new record in then-longest round-trip flight over water and land and received Distinguished Flying Cross for this feat. He was also commissioned second lieutenant in the regular Marine Corps on May 2, 1921.

Young Sandy was assigned back to 1st Brigade of Marines and sailed again for Haiti in April 1922. After a one-year tour of duty at Haiti, he was ordered to Navy Department in Washington, D.C., where he was assigned to the Bureau of Aeronautics. In October 1923, he attended the Company Officers Course at Marine Corps Schools at Quantico, Virginia.

== World War II ==
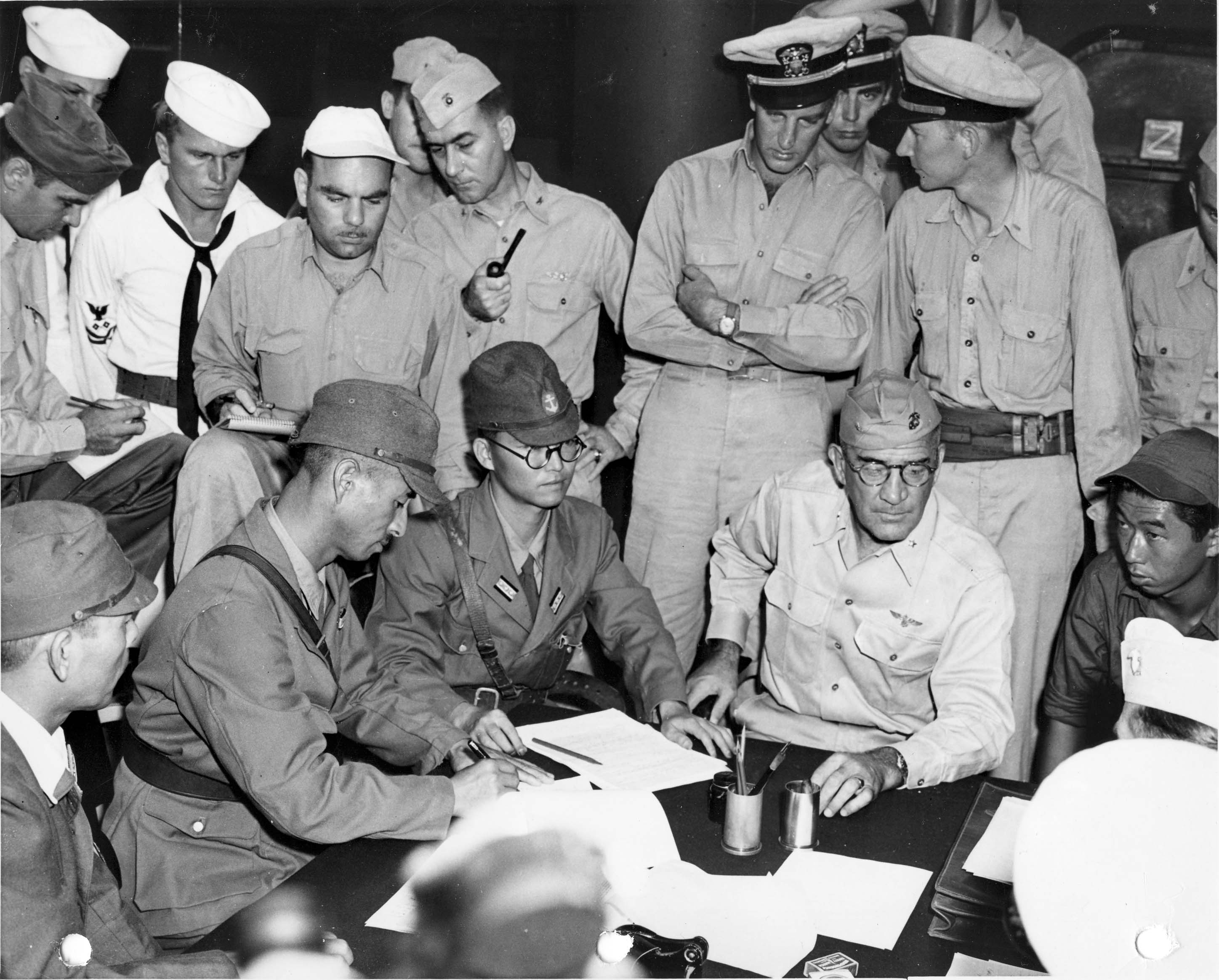
General Sanderson (seated in the center) accepts Japanese surrender of Wake Island from admiral Shigematsu Sakaibara (second from the left).

With the outbreak of World War II, First Marine Aircraft Group was expanded to the 1st Marine Aircraft Wing under the command of Colonel Louis E. Woods and Sanderson was appointed wing operations officer. Wing was sent to the Pacific in September 1942 and subsequently participated in the Guadalcanal campaign. For his service in this capacity, Sanderson was decorated with the Legion of Merit.

Sanderson was appointed commanding officer of the Marine Aircraft Group 11 based on New Hebrides Islands in January 1943 and participated in the air attacks against Japanese fortifications during Solomon Islands campaign. However, he was transferred back to the United States in March 1943 and subsequently appointed commander of Marine Base Defense Aircraft Group 42 within 3rd Marine Aircraft Wing at Marine Corps Air Station Santa Barbara, California. He was responsible for the training of new Marine aviators in this capacity.

Sanderson assumed command of Marine Fleet Air, West Coast in September 1944 and continued in his previous training duties. Nevertheless, he was promoted to the rank of brigadier general in January 1945 and remained in command of Marine Fleet Air, West Coast until May 1945, when he was transferred back to Pacific. Sanderson relieved Brigadier General Louis E. Woods in command of 4th Marine Aircraft Wing and subsequently participated in air support operations over Gilbert and Marshall Islands. He also accepted surrender of Wake Island from Japanese admiral Shigematsu Sakaibara on September 4, 1945, who was later sentenced to death by a military tribunal for war crimes in connection with execution of 98 civilian workers in October 1943 and hanged on June 18, 1947.

== Postwar service ==
Sanderson was attached to the staff of Aircraft, Fleet Marine Force, Pacific in March 1946, and served under Major General William J. Wallace. He remained there until the end of June and subsequently was appointed commanding general of 1st Marine Aircraft Wing based in Tientsin, China. The 1st MAW remained in China until October 1947, when it was ordered back to the United States. Upon his return, Sanderson was appointed deputy commander of the 1st MAW again under the command of Major General Woods and served in this capacity until July 1949.

Sanderson was subsequently appointed deputy commander of General William J. Wallace within Aircraft, Fleet Marine Force, Atlantic and later followed General Wallace to 2nd Marine Aircraft Wing also as deputy commander. He retired from active duty in December 1951 and advanced to the rank of major general on the retired list for having been specially commended in combat.

Sanderson died on June 11, 1973, in San Diego, California, and is buried at Arlington National Cemetery, Virginia, together with his wife Louise N. Sanderson. They had together a son, Lawson E. and a daughter Doris N. In August 1966, Sanderson Field was named in his honor.

== Decorations ==
Here is the ribbon bar of Major General Lawson H. M. Sanderson:

Naval Aviator Badge
1st Row	Legion of Merit		Distinguished Flying Cross	
2nd Row	Navy Presidential Unit Citation with one star	Marine Corps Expeditionary Medal with two stars	World War I Victory Medal with clasp	Haitian Campaign Medal
3rd Row	Second Nicaraguan Campaign Medal	American Defense Service Medal with clasp	American Campaign Medal	Asiatic-Pacific Campaign Medal with three service stars
4th Row	World War II Victory Medal	China Service Medal	National Defense Service Medal	Nicaraguan Presidential Order of Merit with Gold star

=== Legion of Merit citation ===
The President of the United States of America takes pleasure in presenting the Legion of Merit to Colonel Lawson H. M. Sanderson (MCSN: 0-860), United States Marine Corps, for exceptionally meritorious conduct in the performance of outstanding services to the Government of the United States. From 17 October 1942 to 31 December 1942, Colonel Sanderson served as operations officer of the FIRST Marine Aircraft Wing at Guadalcanal, British Solomon Islands. In this capacity he was charged with the coordination, supervision and tactical employment of all army, Navy and Marine Corps aircraft based at Guadalcanal. He repeatedly exposed himself to enemy bombing, shelling by ground artillery and naval guns, and on some occasions when shells were bursting within a very short distance, when it was necessary to the task at hand. His efficient conduct of the operations of our aircraft, combined with his coolness and devotion to duty under fire have provided an excellent example to all personnel associated with him.
