= William J. Wallace (USMC) =

United States Marine Corps general

William Jennings Wallace
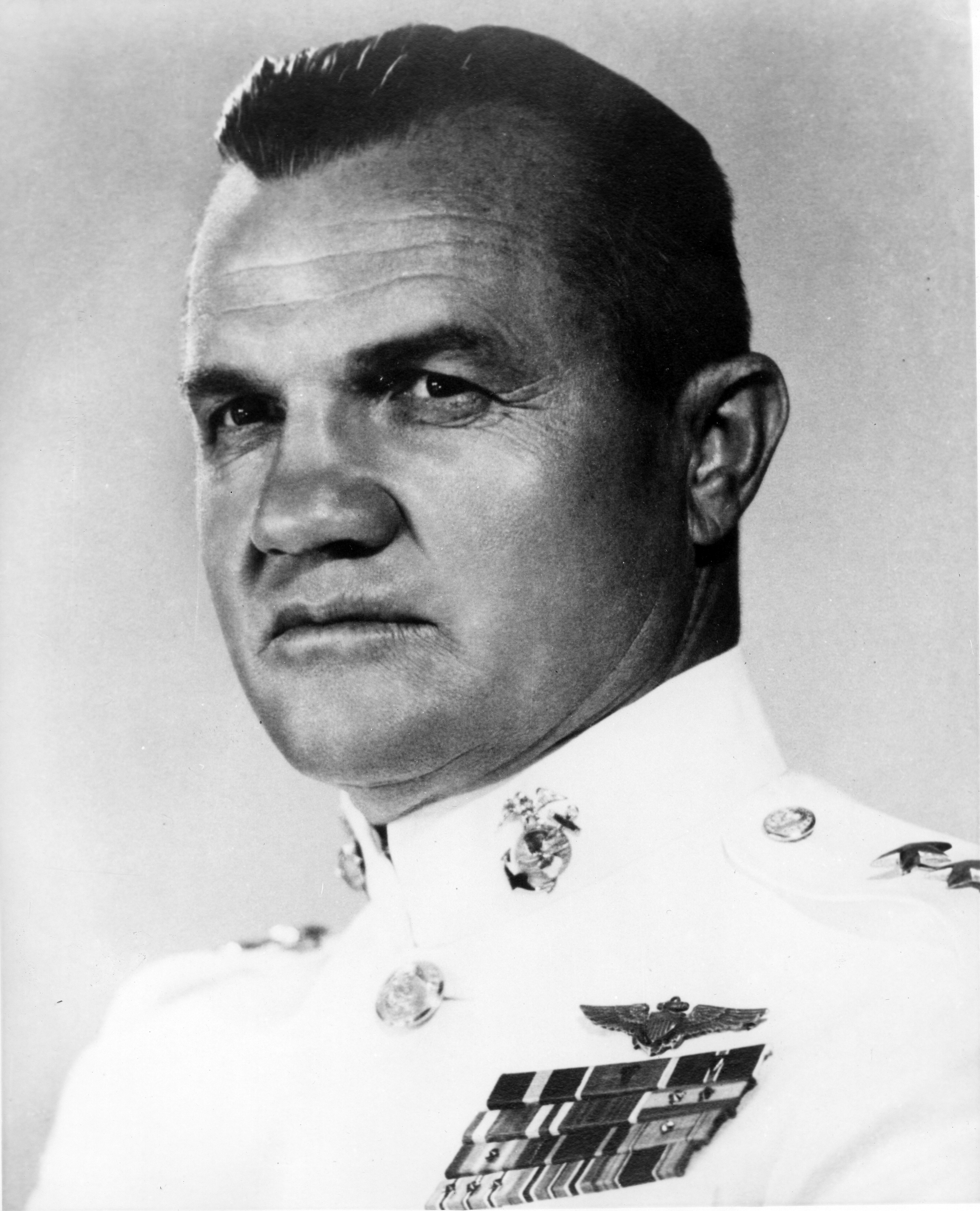
- Maj. Gen. William J. Wallace, USMC
- Born: August 6, 1895; Church Hill, Maryland, U.S.
- Died: July 7, 1977 (aged 81); San Diego, California, U.S.
- Burial place: Arlington National Cemetery
- Military career
- Allegiance: United States of America
- Branch: United States Marine Corps
- Service years: 1917–1952
- Rank: Lieutenant general
- Service number: 0-1031
- Commands: Director of Aviation; Air Defense and Fighter Command; Marine Air, West Coast; 2nd Marine Aircraft Wing; MAG-22; MAG-23
- Conflicts: Dominican Campaign; World War I Yangtze Patrol; World War II: Attack on Pearl Harbor; Guadalcanal campaign; Solomon Islands campaign; Battle of Okinawa
- Awards: Navy Distinguished Service Medal; Legion of Merit; Bronze Star Medal; Purple Heart

William Jennings Wallace (August 6, 1895 – July 7, 1977) was a highly decorated aviation officer of the United States Marine Corps with the rank of lieutenant general. He is most noted for his service as commanding officer of MAG-22 at Midway and MAG-23 at Guadalcanal and the Air Defense Command during the Battle of Okinawa.

== Early years ==
Wallace was born on August 6, 1895, in Church Hill, Maryland, and later attended Washington College in Chestertown, Maryland, where he graduated with Bachelor of Science degree in May 1917. He almost immediately enlisted in the Marine Corps on May 15, 1917, and was assigned to the Officer Candidates School at Marine Barracks Quantico, Virginia. Wallace graduated from the officer's school on June 15, 1918, and was commissioned second lieutenant on the same date.

== World War II ==
In March 1941, Wallace was transferred to Oahu, Hawaii, where he was appointed executive officer of the Marine Aircraft Group 21 based at Ewa Field under the command of Colonel Claude A. Larkin. Wallace was present at the time of the Japanese attack on Pearl Harbor and participated in the defense of the Ewa Field. He remained in this capacity until March 1942, when he was transferred to the command of newly activated Marine Aircraft Group 22 at Midway Atoll.

However, he was relieved by Colonel Ira L. Kimes in April 1942 and appointed commanding officer of the Marine Aircraft Group 23. He was also promoted to the rank of colonel on May 21, 1942. Wallace led MAG 23 during the Guadalcanal Campaign until 13 October 1942, when he was wounded by heavy-caliber naval shell during a Japanese bombardment of American positions. He distinguished himself while serving there and was decorated with the Legion of Merit with Combat "V". Wallace was evacuated to United States for recovery and he was pronounced fit for duty in February 1943. He was subsequently appointed chief of staff of the Marine Fleet Air, West Coast based at San Diego, California, under the command of Brigadier General Lewie G. Merritt.

Wallace was promoted to the rank of brigadier general on December 5, 1943, and succeeded General Merritt as Commanding General Marine Fleet Air, West Coast in January 1944. In this capacity, he was responsible for activation of all Navy and Marine Corps aviation units on the West Coast. At the end of May 1944, Wallace was transferred to Naval Station Pearl Harbor, where he was appointed Chief of staff of Aircraft, Fleet Marine Force, Pacific under the command of Major General Ross E. Rowell and later Francis P. Mulcahy. For his service in this capacity, Wallace was decorated with the Bronze Star Medal with Combat "V" in late 1944.

In March 1945, General Wallace was transferred back to the Pacific Theater and assumed command of Air Defense Command and Fighter Command within Tactical Air Force, Tenth Army. He participated in Battle of Okinawa with this command and distinguished himself, when went ashore and personally directed the air operations against enemy. Units under his command destroyed over 500 enemy's aircraft. For his service on Okinawa, Wallace was decorated with the Navy Distinguished Service Medal.

=== Navy Distinguished Service Medal citation ===
The President of the United States of America takes pleasure in presenting the Navy Distinguished Service Medal to Brigadier General William J. Wallace (MCSN: 0-1031), United States Marine Corps, for exceptionally meritorious conduct in the performance of outstanding services to the Government of the United States in a duty of great responsibility as Commanding General of Air Defense Command and Fighter Command, during action against enemy Japanese forces at Okinawa, from 1 April 1945 to 10 June 1945. A forceful and dynamic leader, highly skilled in the tactics of aerial warfare, Brigadier General Wallace went ashore on Okinawa on 2 April, and, despite inclement weather conditions, limited personnel and the confusion of unloading and carrying out the disposition of supplies for a major campaign, expertly directed operations for the arrival and immediate launching of strikes by Marine Fighter aircraft; located and established an Air Defense Control Center and all available air warning squadrons and inaugurated Fighter Command operations in preparation for the scheduled landing of the first fighter group on 7 April. Continuing his brilliant direction, Brigadier General Wallace coordinated and supervised his composite organization of operating fighter groups, night fighter squadrons and air warning squadrons in carrying out their devastating offensive to account for more than 500 Japanese aircraft and provide close air support for our advancing ground forces during the assault phases of our sustained advance to capture this vital hostile stronghold. By his superb professional ability, sound judgment and cool courage under fire, Brigadier General Wallace contributed materially to the successful prosecution of the war and his valiant devotion to duty throughout reflects the highest credit upon himself, his command and the United States Naval Service.

== Postwar career ==
General Wallace was transferred back to the United States in August 1945 to take again command of the Marine Air, West Coast. He relieved Brigadier General Ivan W. Miller on August 15 and was promoted to the rank of major general on the same date. Wallace served in this capacity for one year, before he was succeeded by Major General Louis E. Woods in August 1946 and was subsequently appointed commanding general aircraft, Fleet Marine Force, Pacific. He succeeded Major General James T. Moore in this capacity.

Wallace was transferred to the Marine Corps Air Station Cherry Point, North Carolina, in September 1947 and took command of Aircraft, Fleet Marine Force, Atlantic. He also served simultaneously as commanding general of 2nd Marine Aircraft Wing based there. On 24 February 1948, Wallace was transferred to the Headquarters Marine Corps in Washington, D.C., to be appointed Director of Marine Corps Aviation. He succeeded Major General Field Harris in this capacity and served there until the beginning of September 1950, when he was relieved by Brigadier General Clayton C. Jerome.

His final assignment was again as commanding general aircraft, Fleet Marine Force, Pacific with headquarters at Marine Corps Air Station El Toro, California. Wallace finally retired from the Marine Corps on July 1, 1952, and was advanced to the rank of lieutenant general on the retired list for having been specially commended in combat.

Wallace died on July 7, 1977, and is buried at Arlington National Cemetery, Virginia, together with his wife Fannie Grant Macy Wallace (1905–1993), a great-granddaughter of former U.S. President Ulysses S. Grant.

== Decorations ==
Here is the ribbon bar of Lieutenant General William J. Wallace:

Naval Aviator Badge
1st Row	Navy Distinguished Service Medal		Legion of Merit with Combat "V"	
2nd Row	Bronze Star Medal with Combat "V"	Navy Commendation Medal	Purple Heart	Navy Presidential Unit Citation with two stars
3rd Row	Marine Corps Expeditionary Medal with two stars	World War I Victory Medal with Clasp	Yangtze Service Medal	American Defense Service Medal with Base Clasp
4th Row	American Campaign Medal	Asiatic-Pacific Campaign Medal with three service stars	World War II Victory Medal	National Defense Service Medal

Military offices
Preceded by Lewie G. Merritt	Commanding General of Marine Fleet Air, West Coast; September 30, 1943 – May 14, 1944; First term	Succeeded by Francis P. Mulcahy
Preceded by Ivan W. Miller	Commanding General of Marine Air, West Coast; August 15, 1945 – August, 1946; Second term	Succeeded by Louis E. Woods
Preceded by Field Harris	Director of Aviation; February 24, 1948 - September 1, 1950	Succeeded by Clayton C. Jerome
