= Lewie G. Merritt =

United States Marine Corps general

Lewie Griffith Merritt
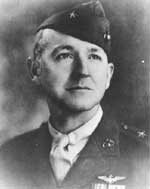
- MajGen Lewie G. Merritt
- Born: June 26, 1897; Ridge Spring, South Carolina, U.S.
- Died: March 24, 1974 (aged 76); Fort Sam Houston, Texas, U.S.
- Burial place: Arlington National Cemetery
- Military career
- Allegiance: United States of America
- Branch: United States Marine Corps
- Service years: 1917–1947
- Rank: Major General
- Nickname: "Griff"
- Commands: Marine Fleet Air, West Coast; 4th Marine Aircraft Wing; 9th Marine Aircraft Wing; 1st Marine Aircraft Wing
- Conflicts: Banana Wars: Occupation of the Dominican Republic; Occupation of Haiti; World War I: Belleau Wood; World War II: Battle of Tarawa; Battle of Kwajalein; Solomon Islands Campaign
- Awards: Legion of Merit; Bronze Star (2)
- Other work: Lawyer, Director of the South Carolina Legislative Council

Lewie Griffith Merritt (nicknamed "Griff") (June 26, 1897 – March 24, 1974) was a Major General and early aviator in the United States Marine Corps. Merritt served over 30 years in the Marine Corps, including service in World War I at Belleau Wood and as an aviator during World War II in both the European and Pacific Theaters. After retiring from the Marine Corps, Merritt practiced law in South Carolina.

== Education and career ==
Lewie Merritt was born on June 26, 1897, in Ridge Spring, South Carolina. In 1917, Merritt graduated from The Citadel at the age of 19 and received a commission in the United States Marine Corps. He served in the Dominican Republic that same year, and in 1918 served in France during World War I. He and several other Citadel graduates became a part of the famous 'Devil Dogs' of Marine Corps legend at the Battle of Belleau Wood in 1918. Following the war Merritt served on the staff of 2 Marine Corps Commandants and was commander of the Marine detachment on the battleship USS New Mexico.

In 1923, Merritt began training as a naval aviator at Pensacola Naval Air Station; he received his "Wings of Gold" in January, 1924. In 1928, he received a law degree from George Washington University followed by service with the Navy Judge Advocate Generals Office in Washington, DC.

Merritt became one of the first Marine aviators qualified to fly off aircraft carriers and is credited with developing the concepts of dive bombing and close air support; his advocacy of air power was instrumental in helping integrate aviation into Marine combat doctrine. Merritt commanded an observation squadron in Haiti and attended the Army Air Corps Tactical School; in 1941, he was assigned as commander for air, Fleet Marine Force Pacific, where he was responsible for establishing the 2d Marine Air Wing in Hawaii and bolstering defenses at Wake and Midway Islands. In January 1942, he was promoted to brigadier general and assigned as air attaché at the US Embassy in London.

== World War II ==
During World War II, Merritt traveled to Cairo, Egypt to observe British air operations in desert warfare. There he had the unusual distinction of being shot down while a passenger on a Royal Air Force Wellington bomber. Returning to the United States, Merritt was given command of the newly organized Marine Fleet Air, West Coast in San Diego from January to September 1943.

General Merritt was reassigned to command the Fourth Marine Air Wing in the Central Pacific from October 1943 to May 1944, where his leadership was instrumental in the success of the Tarawa and Kwajalein Air Campaigns, and critical air support of Marine Corps amphibious operations in the Pacific. He received a letter of censure for the loss of 6 pilots and 22 planes of VMF-422 in January 1944 for refusing to provide an escort plane.

From September 1944 to January 1945, Merritt returned to the United States to command the 9th Marine Aircraft Wing at Marine Corps Air Station Cherry Point. While serving as Commanding General of the 1st MAW from June to August 1945 during the New Ireland and New Britain campaigns, he personally directed air support missions against Japanese forces and also commanded all Allied air units in the Northern Solomons.

General Merritt was the only Marine Corps Aviator to serve in both the European and Asian Theaters of battle during World War II.

== Later years ==
After the war, Merritt served on President Harry S. Truman's Strategic Bombing Survey, which examined U.S. bombing successes against Japanese targets; he retired from the Marine Corps in 1947. Merritt practiced law in Columbia, South Carolina, then was chosen by Governor Strom Thurmond to serve as director of the South Carolina Legislative Council. He also managed the successful campaign of Lt. Gov. George Timmerman for governor in 1956.

He died after a lengthy illness at Fort Sam Houston, Texas, on March 24, 1974. He is buried at Arlington National Cemetery.

In 1975, the airfield at Marine Corps Air Station Beaufort in Beaufort, South Carolina, was renamed in his honor; it is now known as Merritt Field.

== Decorations ==

Naval Aviator insignia
1st row	Legion of Merit	Bronze Star Medal with Gold Star	Marine Corps Expeditionary Medal
2nd row	World War I Victory Medal with Battle Clasp	American Defense Service Medal with Base Clasp	American Campaign Medal
3rd row	European-African-Middle Eastern Campaign Medal with one service star	Asiatic-Pacific Campaign Medal with four service stars	World War II Victory Medal

== See also ==
- List of 1st Marine Aircraft Wing commanders

Military offices
Preceded by Unit activated	Commanding General of Marine Fleet Air, West Coast; January 22, 1943 – September 30, 1943	Succeeded by William J. Wallace
Preceded by Harold C. Major	Commanding General of the 1st Marine Aircraft Wing; June 11, 1945 – August 11, 1945	Succeeded by Claude A. Larkin
