= Field Harris =

United States Marine Corps general

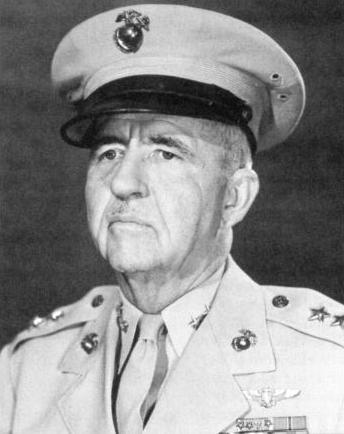
- Born: September 18, 1895; Versailles, Kentucky, US
- Died: December 21, 1967 (aged 72)
- Relatives: William Frederick Harris (son)
- Military career
- Allegiance: United States
- Branch: United States Marine Corps
- Service years: 1917–1953
- Rank: Lieutenant general
- Service number: 0-401
- Commands: Director of Aviation; 1st Marine Aircraft Wing
- Conflicts: World War I World War II; Korean War
- Awards: Navy Distinguished Service Medal; Army Distinguished Service Medal; Legion of Merit (4); Bronze Star Medal

Field Harris CBE (September 18, 1895 – December 21, 1967) was a highly decorated lieutenant general in the United States Marine Corps, who commanded the Marine Aviation Units during World War II and 1st Marine Aircraft Wing during the Korean War.

== Early years ==
Thomas Field Harris was born on September 18, 1895, in Versailles, Kentucky, the son of Andrew Thomas and Lena Field Harris.

He attended the United States Naval Academy at Annapolis, Maryland, and graduated in 1917. He was subsequently appointed a second lieutenant in the Marine Corps on March 30 of that year.

His first assignment was for a brief period aboard the USS Nevada and subsequently was assigned to the Third Provisional Brigade at Guantánamo Bay, Cuba. Harris stayed in this capacity until April 1919. His next service assignment was at Naval Station Cavite, Philippine Islands, where he participated in the shore patrol duty. Field was transferred back to the United States in June 1922, when he assigned to the Judge Advocate General in Washington, D.C. While there he graduated from George Washington University School of Law. Subsequently, he was assigned to battleship USS Wyoming, where he was appointed a commanding officer of the Marine detachment.

Field later attended the advanced one-year course at Marine Corps Base Quantico and then began flight training at the Naval Air Station Pensacola, Florida. He was designated a Naval Aviator on April 13, 1929. His first duties as a flyer were at Naval Air Station, San Diego, where he served as a commanding officer and executive officer of an aircraft squadron within West Coast Expeditionary Force. Field then attended the course of instructions at Air Corps Tactical School at Langley Field and subsequently served within shore duty in Haiti and sea duty aboard the aircraft carrier USS Lexington. Field's next service assignment was at Headquarters Marine Corps in Washington, D.C., where he served in the aviation section. He also attended the Naval War College at Newport, Rhode Island, where he graduated from the Senior course in May 1939.

== World War II ==
At the beginning of the War, Field served still in Cairo, Egypt, as assistant naval attaché. He had the opportunity to study the Royal Air Force's support of Britain's Eighth Army in its desert operations. After that, he went to the South Pacific and was chief of staff, aircraft, on Guadalcanal.

== Korean War and retirement ==
Major General Harris was commanding general of 1st Marine Aircraft Wing during the Korean War. His son, Lieutenant Colonel William Frederick Harris, USMC, was lost on December 7, 1950, in the breakout at the Battle of Chosin Reservoir. General Harris retired July 1953 and subsequently worked as librarian for the Kentucky State Law Library.

General Harris died in 1967.

== Decorations ==
Here is the ribbon bar of Lieutenant General Field Harris:

Naval Aviator Badge
| 1st Row | Navy Distinguished Service Medal | | Army Distinguished Service Medal | Legion of Merit with three Gold Stars and Combat "V" |
| 2nd Row | Bronze Star Medal | Air Medal | Navy Commendation Medal | Navy Presidential Unit Citation with Star |
| 3rd Row | Army Presidential Unit Citation | Marine Corps Expeditionary Medal | World War I Victory Medal with aviation clasp | Haitian Campaign Medal |
| 4th Row | American Defense Service Medal with Base Clasp | Asiatic-Pacific Campaign Medal with three service stars | American Campaign Medal | World War II Victory Medal |
| 5th Row | Korean Service Medal with two service stars | National Defense Service Medal | Commander of the Order of the British Empire | United Nations Korea Medal |

Military offices
| Preceded by Louis E. Woods | Director of Aviation; July 18, 1944 – February 24, 1948 | Succeeded by William J. Wallace |
| Preceded by Louis E. Woods | Commanding Officer of the 1st Marine Aircraft Wing; July 1949 – July 27, 1951 | Succeeded by Christian F. Schilt |
