= Claude A. Larkin =

United States Marine Corps general

Claude Arthur Larkin
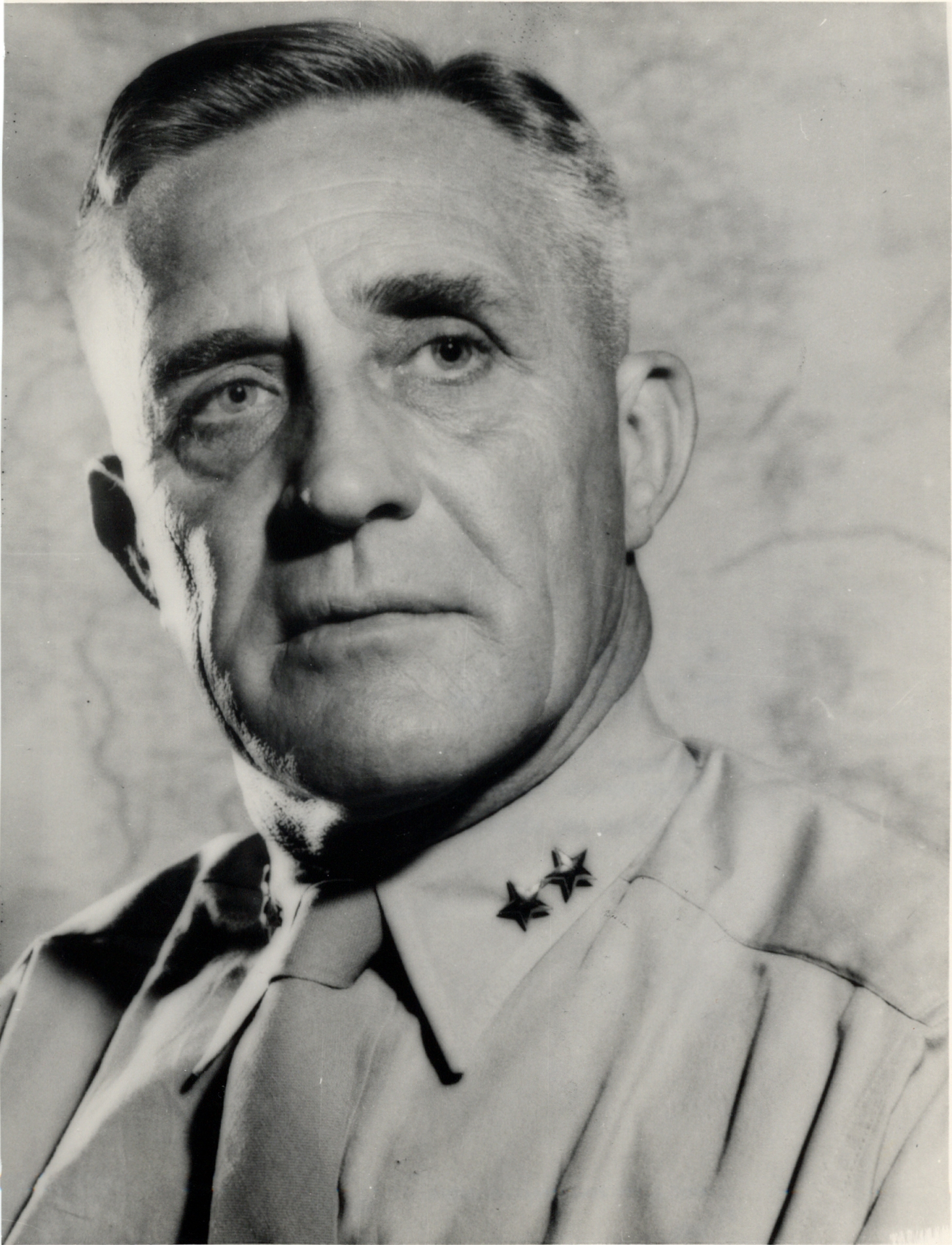
- Born: June 21, 1891; Garfield, Washington, US
- Died: November 2, 1969 (aged 78) Riverside, California, US
- Allegiance: United States
- Branch: United States Marine Corps
- Service years: 1915–1946
- Rank: Lieutenant General
- Commands: Marine Aircraft Group 21; 3rd Marine Aircraft Wing; Marine Air, West Coast; 1st Marine Aircraft Wing
- Conflicts: Banana Wars: Sugar Intervention; Occupation of Haiti; World War II: Attack on Pearl Harbor
- Awards: Legion of Merit (3); Purple Heart

Claude Arthur Larkin (June 21, 1891 – November 2, 1969) was a United States Marine with the rank of lieutenant general.

== Early life and career ==
Claude A. Larkin was born in Garfield, Washington, on June 21, 1891. Larkin enlisted in the Marine Corps on December 21, 1915. He was first assigned to the USS Oklahoma and was present when the ship was commissioned. He soon attended Officer Candidates School and was commissioned as a second lieutenant on July 6, 1917.

Larkin was stationed in Cuba during the Sugar Intervention from 1917 to 1918. He did not see combat in World War I, which was the reason he enlisted. In the 1920s, he was stationed in Haiti. He later was aboard the USS Chaumont and went to China in 1927, staying there until 1929.

On April 6, 1930, he graduated from flight training at Naval Air Station Pensacola, Florida. He was then stationed in the Virgin Islands, and later attended additional training at Maxwell Field in Alabama. He also attended the Navy War College in Newport, Rhode Island.

== Pearl Harbor ==
Lieutenant Colonel Larkin was eventually given command of Marine Aircraft Group 21 at Marine Corps Air Station Ewa, on the island of Oahu, Hawaii.

On December 7, 1941, Larkin was driving to the airfield when the Japanese attack on Pearl Harbor commenced. Larkin's vehicle was strafed by Japanese aircraft twice on the road outside the airfield. Despite these close calls, he arrived at the airfield unscathed and discovered all of the aircraft had been destroyed. He began organizing the defenses when he was strafed a third time and was wounded in the hand, leg and foot. He refused medical attention and continued directing the defenses.

Larkin was promoted to colonel after the attack, followed by a promotion to brigadier general in October 1942. In November 1943, he was awarded the Legion of Merit for his service as the senior naval aviator present for the Marines during the first eight months of World War II.

== Later service and life ==
From December 1943 to April 1944, Larkin was appointed as the commanding general of the 3rd Marine Aircraft Wing. Larkin was promoted to major general and held command of Marine Fleet Air, West Coast, from March to July 1945. He served as the commanding general of the 1st Marine Aircraft Wing from August 11 to October 31, 1945.

Larkin was promoted to lieutenant general and subsequently retired from the Marines on March 1, 1946, after more than 30 years of service. Claude A. Larkin died at the Air Force Base Hospital in Riverside, California, on November 2, 1969.

== See also ==
- List of 1st Marine Aircraft Wing commanders

Military offices
Preceded by Lawson H. M. Sanderson	Commanding General of Marine Fleet Air, West Coast; March 20, 1945 – July 24, 1945	Succeeded by Ivan W. Miller
Preceded by Lewie G. Merritt	Commanding General of the 1st Marine Aircraft Wing; August 11, 1945 – October 31, 1945	Succeeded by Louis E. Woods
