= Marine Aircraft Group 11 =

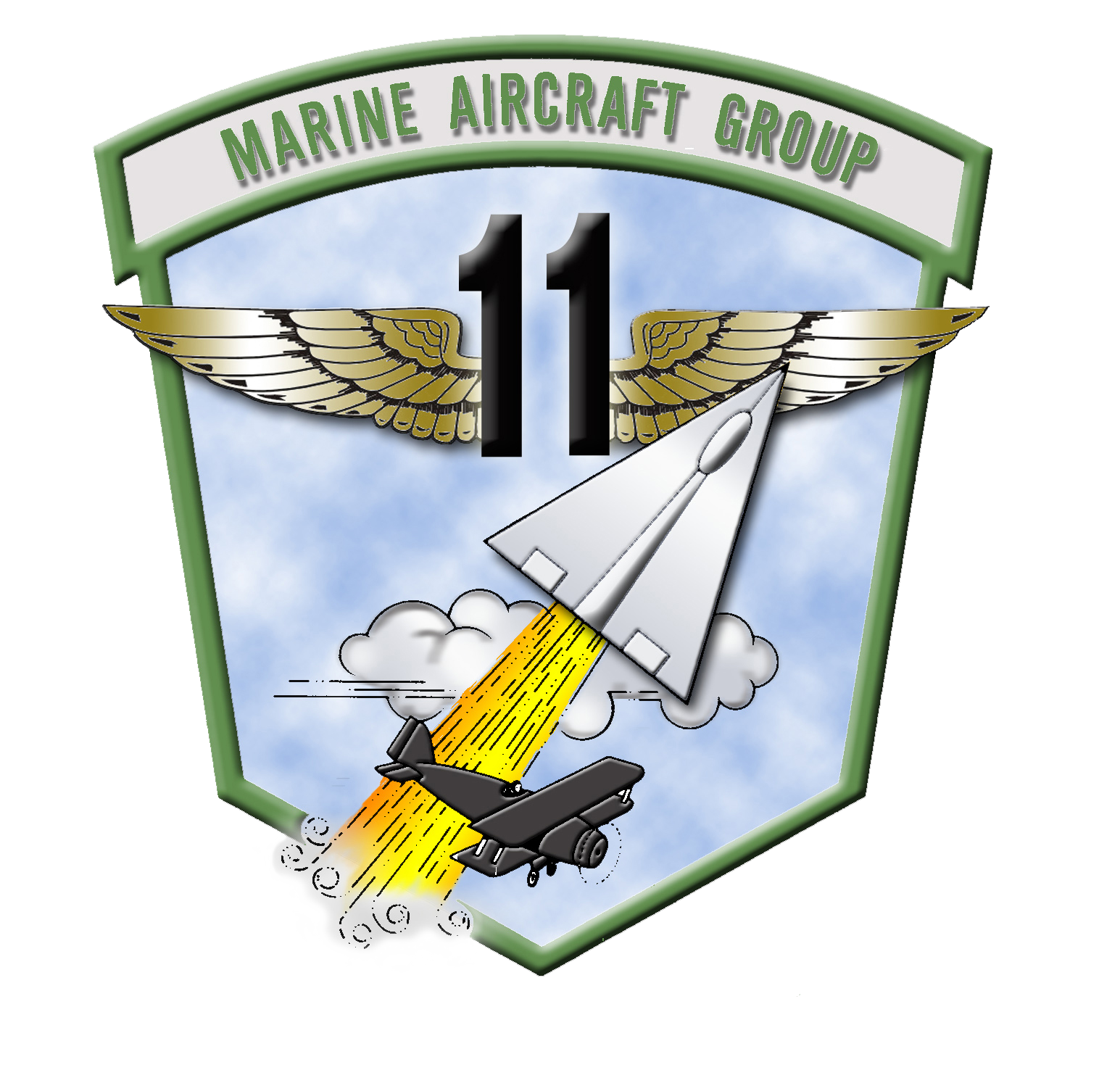
- MAG-11 insignia
- Active: 1 December 1920 – present
- Allegiance: United States of America
- Branch: United States Marine Corps
- Type: Fixed wing aircraft
- Role: Offensive Air Support; Antiair Warfare; Aerial Reconnaissance; Assault Support
- Size: Group
- Part of: 3rd Marine Aircraft Wing; I Marine Expeditionary Force
- Garrison/HQ: Marine Corps Air Station Miramar
- Engagements: World War II; Korean War; Second Taiwan Strait Crisis; Vietnam War; Operation Desert Storm; Operation Enduring Freedom; Iraq War

Commanders
- Current commander: Colonel William "Skull" Mitchell
- Notable commanders: Caleb Bailey

Marine Aircraft Group 11 is a United States Marine Corps aviation unit based at Marine Corps Air Station Miramar that is currently composed of two F-35C squadrons, one F-35B squadron, two F/A-18C squadrons, one fleet replacement squadron, one KC-130J tactical aerial refueling squadron, a maintenance and logistics squadron, and a wing support squadron. They fall under the command of the 3rd Marine Aircraft Wing and the I Marine Expeditionary Force.

== Mission ==
Provide air support to Marine Air Ground Task Force commanders.

== Organization 2024 ==
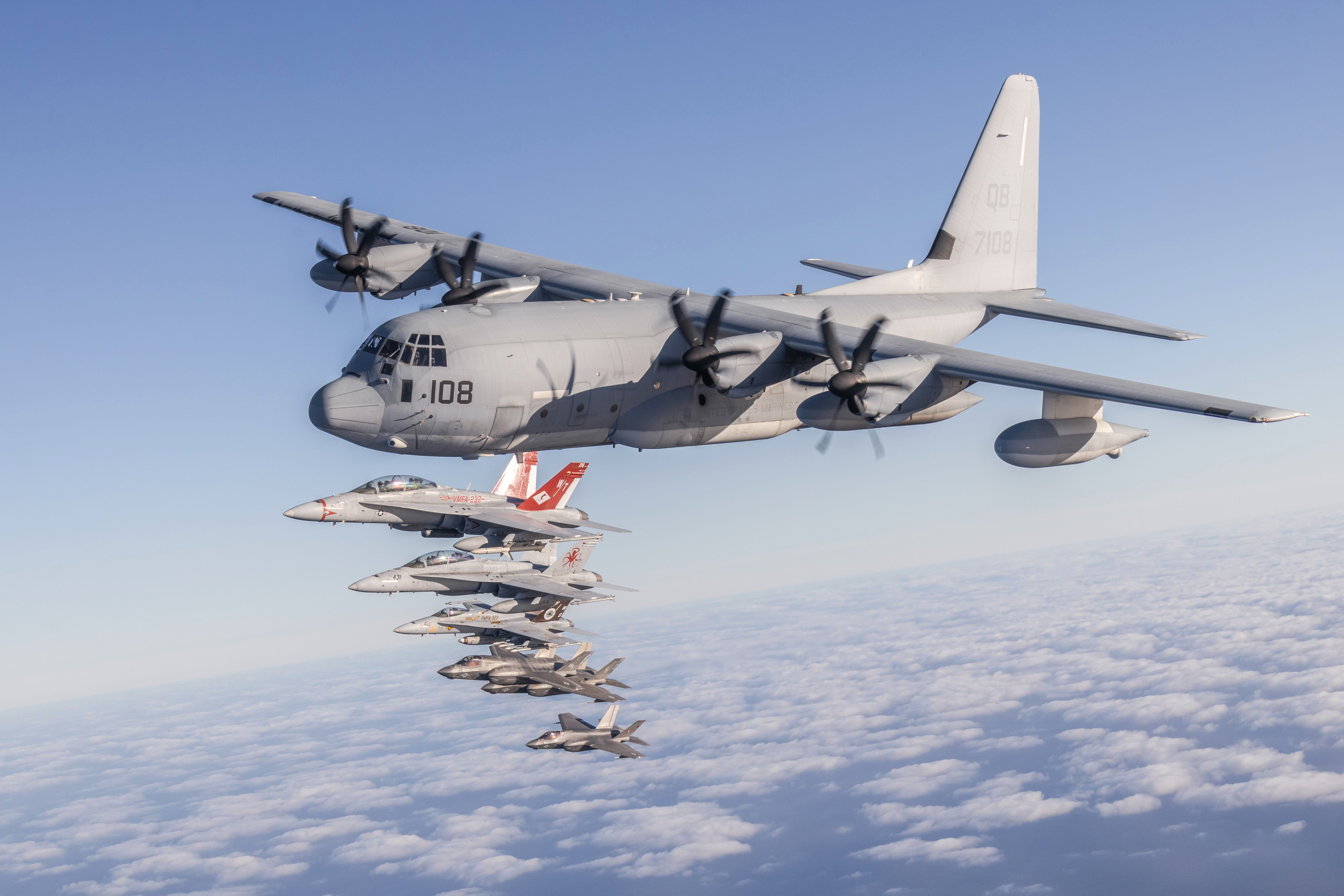
Marines assigned to MAG 11 fly in formation as part of Project Legacy, March 4, 2025.

As of March 2024 the Marine Aircraft Group 11 consists of:

F/A-18 Hornet squadrons:

- VMFA-232 "Red Devils"
- VMFA-323 "Death Rattlers"

KC-130J Super Hercules squadrons:

- VMGR-352 "Raiders"

F-35B Lightning II squadrons:

- VMFAT-502 "Flying Nightmares"

F-35C Lightning II squadrons:

- VMFA-311 "Tomcats"
- VMFA-314 "Black Knights"

Support squadrons:

- Marine Aviation Logistics Squadron 11 (MALS-11)

== History ==
=== Early history ===
Although commissioned at Marine Corps Base Quantico, Virginia, on 1 August 1941, as the Marine Corps' first aircraft group, elements of the organization that would eventually support its mission actually existed as early as 1 December 1921. Together, these ancestral units were collectively designated as Aircraft Squadron, East Coast Expeditionary Force.

=== World War II ===
Prior to the beginning of World War II, Marine Aircraft Group 11 (MAG-11) was composed of six tactical squadrons which were based at Marine Corps Air Station Quantico, Virginia and Marine Corps Air Station Parris Island, South Carolina. During the summer and fall of 1941 the Group engaged in maneuvers with the 1st Marine Division in the vicinity of Onslow Beach, North Carolina. They departed for the West Coast of the United States in December 1941. Upon arrival, MAG-11 became the Air-Defense Group for the San Diego, California area, based at Camp Kearny. During this interim pre-deployment period, MAG-11 served as the nucleus of four new air groups destined for combat action in the Pacific. MAG-11 embarked for the South Pacific on 15 October 1942 on the SS Lurline (Mumu). They left with no planes and were expected to fly what they found in the Pacific. Squadrons from MAG-11, such as VMSB-132 and VMF-112 landed on Guadalcanal in early November and were among the first to relive the tired original aviators of the Cactus Air Force. Arriving at Espiritu Santo in the New Hebrides Islands, the group launched offensive actions against enemy strongholds, air power, and shipping in the Solomon Islands.

During World War II, MAG-11 participated in combat action in the Solomon Islands, New Britain, Palau, Central Pacific Areas, and the Philippines. At the close of World War II, MAG-11 was based on the island of Peleliu, Palaus Group, where it remained until January 1946.

=== Korean War ===
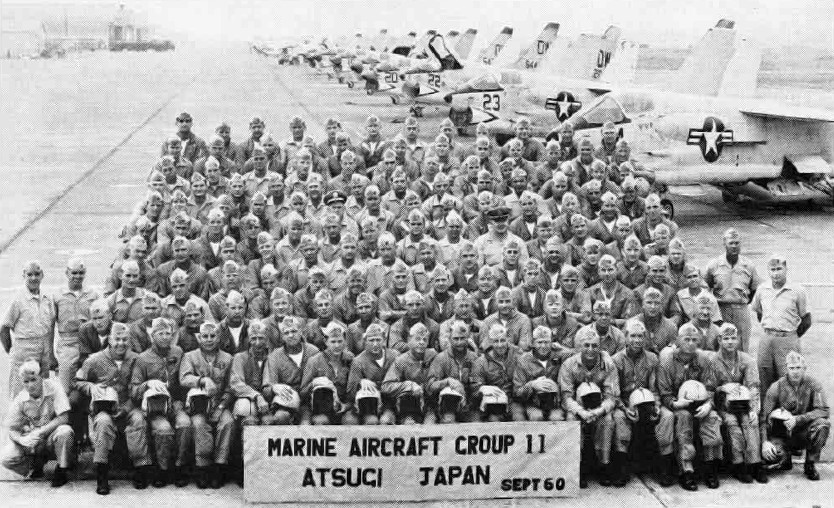
Personnel of MAG-11 at NAS Atsugi, Japan, September 1960.

Temporarily assigned to the San Diego area upon its return to the United States, MAG 11 joined the 2nd Marine Aircraft Wing (2nd MAW) at Marine Corps Air Station Cherry Point, North Carolina in March 1946 and remained organic to that wing until August 1953, when it relocated from Marine Corps Auxiliary Landing Field Edenton, North Carolina to Naval Air Facility Atsugi, Japan. In Japan, elements of MAG 11 actively participated in air operations against North Korean and Chinese forces.

From August 1958 until January 1959, MAG-11 deployed to Taiwan in support of the Nationalist Chinese air defenses, returning again in 1961 and 1963 in support of maneuvers in that area.

=== Vietnam War ===
In April 1965, MAG 11 deployed to Da Nang Air Base, South Vietnam in support of counter-insurgency operations. Within 69 hours, after its departure from Japan, group element launched the first attack against Viet Cong forces.

The Group's mission in combat was carried out primarily by the F-8 Crusader, the F-4 Phantom II, the A-6 Intruder and the A-4 Skyhawk. Headquarters and Maintenance Squadron 11 (the Marine Corps' oldest squadron) and Marine Air Base Squadron 11 supported MAG 11 and attached aircraft squadrons during this period.

During this phase of MAG 11's combat history, the following types of missions were assigned and carried out: close air and direct support; air defense intercept; visual, photographic and electronic reconnaissance; electronic countermeasures; airborne tactical air control; illumination and combat logistical support for air/ground elements of the allied forces.

=== Post Vietnam ===
In May 1971, MAG 11 relocated from Vietnam, reporting to the commanding general, 3rd Marine Aircraft Wing at Marine Corps Air Station El Toro, Santa Ana, Calif. on 10 June 1971. During November 1979, VMFA-323 and VMFA-531 deployed aboard the USS Coral Sea (CV-43). This was the first time in Naval Aviation History that the Marine Corps provided all of the fighter support for a Navy carrier and the first time since World War II that two Marine Fighter squadrons were deployed aboard a Pacific Fleet Carrier.

In July 1982, MAG 11's fighter squadrons began transitioning from the F-4 Phantom II to the Marine Corps' newest tactical jet, the F/A-18 Hornet. On 24 November 1982, the F-4N officially retired form active duty Marine service when VMFA-531 transferred its last Phantom to the Naval Weapons Center. VMFA-314 took delivery of the first fleet F/A-18A on 15 December 1982.

In October 1985, two MAG-11 F/A-18 squadrons, VMFA-314 and VMFA-323, deployed to the Mediterranean aboard the USS Coral Sea (CV-43) and participated in the 15 April 1986, air strikes against Libya.

=== Persian Gulf War ===
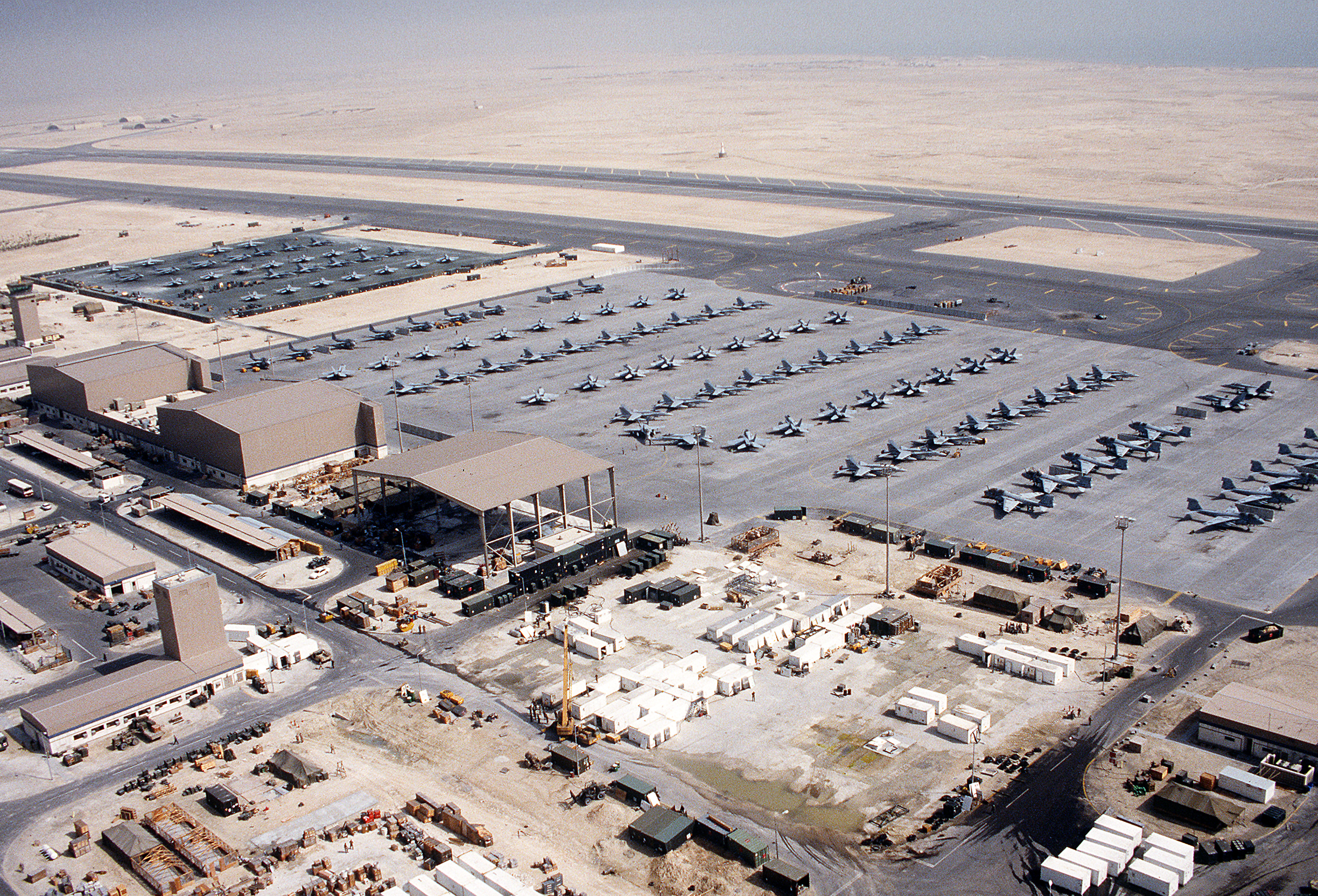
MAG-11 aircraft at Sheik Isa Air Base, Bahrain, in 1991.

In early August 1990, MAG-11 began providing squadrons to MAG-70 for the Air Combat Element (ACE) of 7th Marine Expeditionary Brigade (7th MEB) for deployment to the Middle East as part of Operation Desert Shield. With the establishment of I MEF and 3rd MAW in theater on 3 September 1990, MAG-11 was transferred from MCAS El Toro to Bahrain and assumed operational control of all USMC F/A-18A/C/D, A-6E, EA-6B, and KC-130F/R/T aircraft in Southwest Asia. Prior to commencement of hostilities, MAG-11 grew to become the largest Marine Fixed Wing Air Group in history with squadrons from all four Marine Aircraft Wings. The order to execute Operation Desert Storm was received and extensive combat operations commenced. Initial strikes were flown deep into Iraq with follow on operations designed to prepare the battlefield for the attack by Marine Ground Forces. When the ground war began, MAG-11 flew over 7,500 combat sorties and 16,400 hours, without loss of life or aircraft. The 13 squadrons expended over 17 million pounds of ordnance during combat operations.

=== Global War on Terror ===
During the period of 1 January through 31 March 2003, Marine Aircraft Group 11 (MAG-11) prepared, deployed, and executed combat operations in support of Operation Southern Watch (OSW) and the Iraq War. With the establishment of I MEF and 3rd MAW in theater MAG-11 was transferred from MCAS Miramar to Ahmed Al Jaber Air Base, Kuwait and assumed control of all USMC F/A-18, and C-130 aircraft in Southwest Asia.

After the order to fight in the Iraq War was received, MAG-11 aircraft flew extensive combat operations 24 hours a day. MAG-11 aviators flew 120–130 sorties per day, dropped over 4.2 million pounds of ordnance on targets inside Iraq in support of Marine, Army, and British ground forces and used 250,000 to 300,000 gallons of fuel per day. MAG-11 flew over 4,000 combat sorties and 10,000 flight hours, without loss of life or aircraft. The eight squadrons expended close to four million pounds of ordnance during combat operations.

== See also ==
- United States Marine Corps Aviation
- List of United States Marine Corps aircraft groups
- List of United States Marine Corps aircraft squadrons
