= Louis E. Woods =

United States Marine Corps general

Louis Earnest Woods
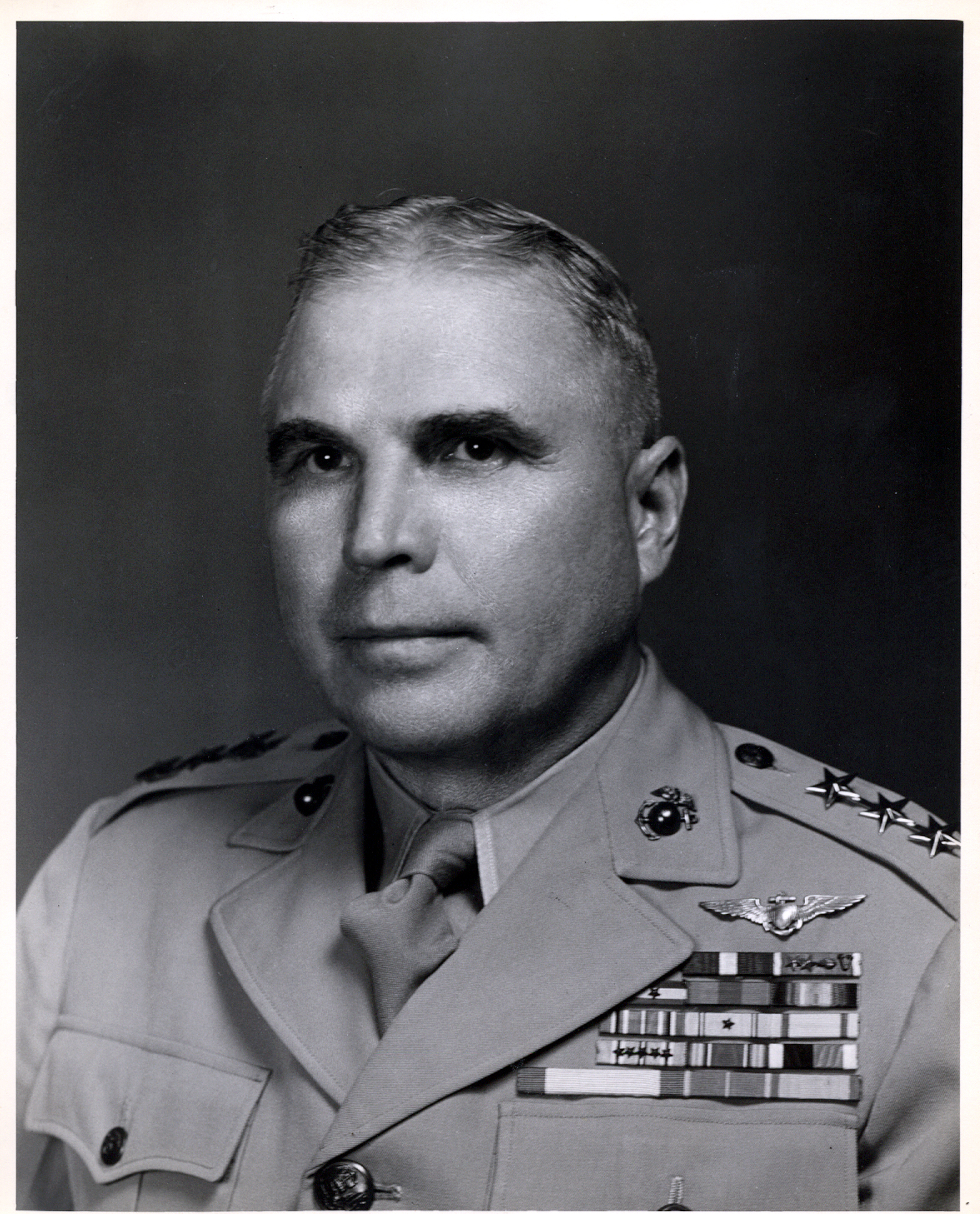
- LtGen Louis E. Woods
- Born: October 7, 1895; Fredonia, New York, U.S.
- Died: October 20, 1971 (aged 76); Washington, D.C., U.S.
- Burial place: Arlington Cemetery
- Military career
- Allegiance: United States of America
- Branch: United States Marine Corps
- Service years: 1917–1951
- Rank: Lieutenant General
- Nicknames: Bullets and Beans
- Commands: 4th Marine Aircraft Wing; Tactical Air Force, Tenth Army; 1st Marine Aircraft Wing; 2nd Marine Aircraft Wing; Aircraft, FMF Atlantic; Marine Air, West Coast
- Conflicts: World War I Banana Wars: Occupation of Haiti; World War II: Battle of Guadalcanal; Gilbert and Marshall Islands campaign; Battle of Okinawa
- Awards: Navy Distinguished Service Medal; Legion of Merit (4)

Lieutenant General Louis Earnest Woods (October 7, 1895 – October 20, 1971), one of the Marine Corps' outstanding aviators, served as commanding general, aircraft, Fleet Marine Force, Atlantic, and 2nd Marine Aircraft Wing at the Marine Corps Air Station Cherry Point, North Carolina, prior to his retirement. During World War II, he commanded the Cactus Air Force at Guadalcanal during November and December, 1942, and later, at Okinawa, was commanding general, Tactical Air Force, Tenth Army, and the 2nd Marine Aircraft Wing.

For outstanding services rendered in the former named position he was awarded a Gold Star in lieu of a third Legion of Merit, and in the second capacity a Distinguished Service Medal. His citation for the latter reads in part, "…Continually exposed to terrific fire from enemy ship and shore batteries, as well as bombing and strafing attacks by hostile aircraft, Brigadier General Woods directed the operations of his forces with such daring skill and tenacious determination that a total of twenty-two Japanese surface craft was sunk and sixth-five planes destroyed. Brigadier General Woods by his dauntless courage and outstanding leadership, contributed in a great measure to the success of our forces in that area."

He attended Syracuse University, Syracuse, New York, and was commissioned a second lieutenant in the Marine Corps on 4 April 1917, just 2 days before the United States declared war on Germany during World War 1. LtGen Woods retired on 1 July 1951, after 34 years of service.

== Biography ==
Louis Woods was born on October 7, 1895, in Fredonia, New York. He attended Syracuse University, Syracuse, New York. Woods died on October 20, 1971, in Washington, D.C.

=== Marine Corps service ===
==== 1917 - 1940 ====
Woods was commissioned a second lieutenant in the United States Marine Corps on April 4, 1917.

Following a course of instruction at the School of Application, Marine Barracks, Norfolk, Virginia, he went to sea duty on board the USS Georgia. In March 1918, he transferred to the USS Pittsburgh where, except for a short period of four months, he remained until ordered ashore in October 1921.

In June 1922, after attending the Aviation School, Pensacola, Florida, he was designated a Naval Aviator. For the next two years he was stationed at Marine Air Station Quantico, Virginia, performing duties as a pilot.

He was ordered to foreign shore duty in Haiti, where in July 1924, he joined Observation Squadron Two, First Marine Brigade, at Port-au-Prince as executive officer of the squadron.

Shortly after his return to the United States in August 1926, he was ordered to Headquarters Marine Corps, Washington, D.C., for duty in the Aviation Section of the Major General Commandant's Department. Except for a one-year course of instruction at the Air Corps Tactical School, Langley Field, Virginia, he remained at Headquarters until August 1933, when he was detached to overseas duty in Haiti. There he joined the First Marine Brigade as executive officer, Observation Squadron Nine-M, at Port-au-Prince.

From August 1934 to June 1937, he was stationed at the Marine Corps Schools, Quantico, Virginia, first as a student in the Senior Course, and later as Chief of the Aviation Section of the Schools.

During the next three years he was executive officer, and then commanding officer, of the Second Marine Aircraft Group at the Naval Air Station San Diego, California. In June 1940, he became a student in the Senior Course, Naval War College, Newport, Rhode Island.

==== World War II ====
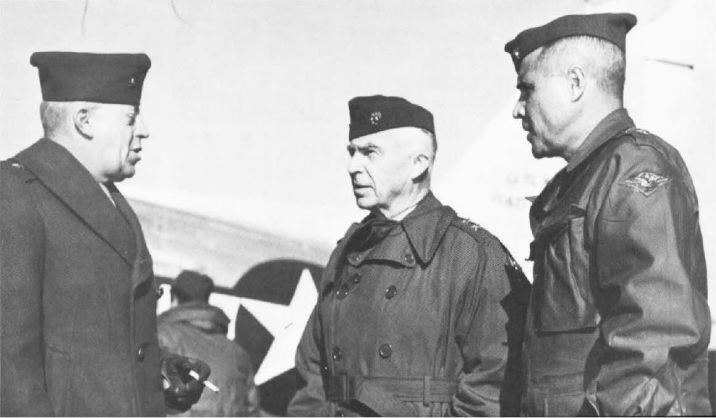
Brigadier general Merritt A. Edson, Commanding General Service Command Fleet Marine Force Pacific, Major general Dewitt Peck (CG 1st Marine Division), Louis E. Woods (CG 1st Marine Aircraft Wing), Tientsin, September 1945.

Upon graduation in May 1941, he joined the 1st Marine Aircraft Wing. He accompanied the Wing to the South Pacific in September 1942, where he participated in the Battle of Guadalcanal as the chief of staff for, then major general, Roy Geiger. He would become commander of the Cactus Air Force on November 7, 1942 and lead the men through the lowest point in the campaign until he turned the command over to Brigadier General Francis P. Mulcahy on December 26, 1942.

He returned to the United States and assumed duties as director, Division of Aviation, Headquarters, Marine Corps in June 1943, where he received a Gold Star in lieu of a second Legion of Merit.

He went to the war in the Pacific for the second time when he assumed command of the 4th Marine Aircraft Wing based in the Marshall-Gilbert Area and was commander, Shore Base Force. He was awarded the Legion of Merit for his service in this area.

In 1944, Wood also had the distinction of sending off to war a 42-year-old pilot named Charles Lindbergh. All but disgraced by his pro-German comments and behavior before World War II, the legendary but tainted Lindbergh had previously been denied returning to the Army Air Corps when he had volunteered after Pearl Harbor. Now in his role as civilian test pilot for United Aircraft, Lindbergh convinced Wood that he could properly test the company's new Vought F4U Corsair fighter planes only by flying them in actual combat conditions. Wood agreed, Lindbergh was soon cleared, and he quickly headed off to the Solomon Islands. where he would fly 50 combat missions.

On June 11, 1945, he succeeded Mulcahy, who was in ill health, as commanding general of the Tactical Air Force, Tenth Army and the 2nd Marine Aircraft Wing, for which he was awarded a Gold Star in lieu of his Third Legion of Merit.

==== Post-war ====
In November 1945, he took command of the 1st Marine Aircraft Wing at Tientsin, China, and received an Oak Leaf Cluster in lieu of a fourth Legion of Merit for his meritorious performance of duty in providing air support for all Allied Forces in North China. Woods was also awarded the Republic of China's Order of the Cloud and Banner.

He returned to the United States to become commander, Marine Air, West Coast in August 1946. When that organization was deactivated in September 1947, General Woods was named commanding general of the 1st Marine Aircraft Wing, which had just returned to the United States. He was detached to Marine Corps Air Station Cherry Point, North Carolina on August 1, 1949, where he remained until his retirement in July 1951.

Woods lived in Washington, D.C. after retirement and served as vice president of the First National Bank of Quantico. After suffering a heart attack, Woods died at Sibley Hospital in Washington. He was interred at Arlington National Cemetery in Section 5 on October 22, 1971.

=== Decorations ===
Wood's decorations include:

Naval Aviator Badge
1st Row	Navy Distinguished Service Medal		Legion of Merit with two Gold Stars, one Oak Leaf Cluster, & Combat "V"	
2nd Row	Navy Presidential Unit Citation with two stars	Marine Corps Expeditionary Medal	World War I Victory Medal	China Service Medal
3rd Row	American Defense Service Medal with clasp	American Campaign Medal	Asiatic-Pacific Campaign Medal with five service stars	World War II Victory Medal
4th Row	Navy Occupation Service Medal	Haitian Order of Honor and Merit, rank of Chevalier with Diploma	Commander of the Order of the British Empire	Order of the Cloud and Banner, Grand Cordon

== See also ==
- List of 1st Marine Aircraft Wing commanders

Military offices
Preceded by Unit activated	Commanding General of the 1st Marine Aircraft Wing; July 7, 1941 – August 20, 1941; First term	Succeeded by Roy Geiger
Preceded by Roy S. Geiger	Director of Aviation; October 15, 1943 – July 17, 1944	Succeeded by Field Harris
Preceded by Claude A. Larkin	Commanding General of the 1st Marine Aircraft Wing; October 31, 1945 – July 1946; Second term	Succeeded by Lawson H. M. Sanderson
Preceded by William J. Wallace	Commanding General of Marine Air, West Coast; August 1946 – October 1, 1947	Succeeded by Unit deactivated
Preceded by William L. McKittrick	Commanding General of the 1st Marine Aircraft Wing; September 1947 – July 1949; Third term	Succeeded by Field Harris
