= Francis P. Mulcahy =

United States Marine Corps general

Francis Patrick Mulcahy
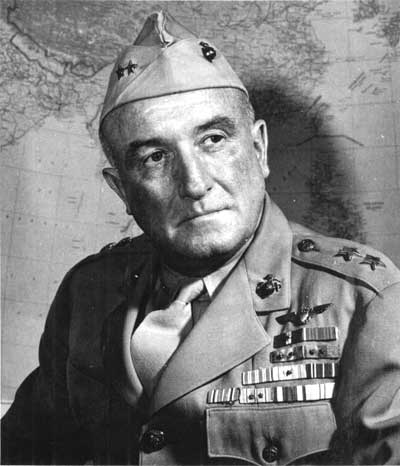
- Major General Francis P. Mulcahy
- Born: March 9, 1894; Rochester, New York, US
- Died: December 11, 1973 (aged 79)
- Military career
- Allegiance: United States of America
- Branch: United States Marine Corps
- Service years: 1917–1946
- Rank: Lieutenant general
- Service number: 0-695
- Commands: 2nd Marine Aircraft Wing; Allied Air Forces in the Solomons (Cactus Air Force), Tactical Air Force, Tenth Army
- Conflicts: World War I World War II: Battle of Guadalcanal; Battle of Okinawa
- Awards: Navy Distinguished Service Medal (2); Army Distinguished Service Medal; Legion of Merit

Francis Patrick Mulcahy CBE (March 9, 1894 – December 11, 1973) was a general and commander in the United States Marine Corps during World War II. Mulcahy commanded the 2nd Marine Aircraft Wing, the Cactus Air Force, and the Tactical Air Force, Tenth Army.

== Military career ==
Mulcahy, a native of Rochester, New York, graduated from Notre Dame University in 1914. In 1917, he was commissioned and attended naval flight school, becoming a naval aviator. Like Roy S. Geiger, Mulcahy flew bombing missions in France during World War I. He became one of the Marine Corps pioneers of close air support to ground operations during the inter-war years of expeditionary campaigns in the Caribbean and Central America.

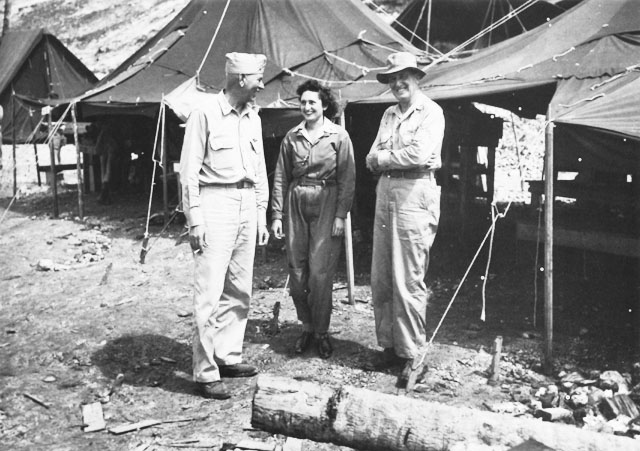
Brigadier General Francis P. Mulcahy (right) at his headquarters at Munda Point, New Georgia, 14 August 1943

At the time of the Japanese attack on Pearl Harbor, Mulcahy was serving as an observer with the British Western Desert Air Force in North Africa. He deployed to the Pacific in command of the 2nd Marine Aircraft Wing. In the closing months of the Guadalcanal campaign, Mulcahy served in command of Allied Air Forces in the Solomon Islands, also known as the Cactus Air Force.

In August 1943, Mulcahy moved from Guadalcanal to New Georgia to command air units operating out of the newly captured airfield at Munda Point.

In September 1944, Mulcahy succeeded Major General Ross E. Rowell, USMC, as the commanding general of Aircraft, Fleet Marine Force. He was also commanding general of the Marine Fleet Air, West Coast.

Mulcahy volunteered to lead the Tactical Air Force, Tenth Army during the Invasion of Okinawa. He was deployed ashore early to the freshly captured air fields at Yontan and Kadena, and worked to coordinate the combat deployment of his joint-service aviators against the kamikaze threat to the fleet and in support of the Tenth Army in its protracted inland campaign. On June 11, 1945, he was relieved by Louis E. Woods because of poor health. Upon his retirement he was promoted to the rank of lieutenant general.

He died on December 11, 1973.

== Awards ==
Mulcahy was the recipient of the following awards:

Naval Aviator Badge
1st Row	Navy Distinguished Service Medal with Gold Star		Army Distinguished Service Medal	Legion of Merit
2nd Row	Navy Commendation Medal with Gold Star	Marine Corps Expeditionary Medal with two service stars	World War I Victory Medal with two battle clasps	Nicaraguan Campaign Medal (1933)
3rd Row	American Defense Service Medal with Foreign Service Clasp	European-African-Middle Eastern Campaign Medal	American Campaign Medal	Asiatic-Pacific Campaign Medal with two service stars
4th Row	World War II Victory Medal	Commander of the Order of the British Empire	Nicaraguan Cross of Valor	Nicaraguan Medal of Distinction and Diploma

== See also ==
- List of Historically Important U.S. Marines
