= Marine Air, West Coast =

- Active: 22 January 1943 – 1 October 1947
- Country: United States of America
- Allegiance: United States
- Branch: United States Marine Corps
- Role: Training and Administration
- Part of: Aircraft, Fleet Marine Force, Pacific
- Garrison/HQ: Naval Air Station San Diego
- Engagements: World War II

Marine Air, West Coast (MarAirWest) was a United States Marine Corps aviation training and administrative command established on 22 January 1943, which was responsible for the administration, training and equipment of the Marine Aviation Units on the West Coast during World War II.

== History ==
Marine Air, West Coast was activated on 22 January 1943 as Marine Fleet Air, West Coast (MarFAirWest) at Naval Air Station San Diego, California under the command of Brigadier General Lewie G. Merritt. Its main purpose was administrating, training and equipping Marine Aviation Units on the West Coast of the United States. The first units of MarFAirWest were assigned in April 1943, when all aviation units from Fleet Marine Force, San Diego Area were reassigned. MarFAirWest was also responsible for providing personnel, equipment and other aviation material to the Aircraft Command, Fleet Marine Force, Pacific.

It was re-designated Marine Air, West Coast in January 1946 and authority for the new designation also consolidated the command with that of the Deputy Commander, Naval Air Bases (Marine Corps Activities), 11th Naval District, formerly situated at Marine Corps Air Station El Toro, Santa Ana, California. Its purpose remained the same - still responsible for supporting Aircraft, Fleet Marine Force, Pacific. The unit was deactivated on 1 October 1947 when the 1st Marine Aircraft Wing returned from overseas duty in China and assumed the commands roles and responsibilities.

== Commanding Generals ==
#	Photo	Name	Rank	Start of tenure	End of tenure	Retired rank	Notes	References
1		Lewie G. Merritt	Brigadier General	22 January 1943	30 September 1943	Major general	Later commanded the 4th Marine Aircraft Wing.	
2		William J. Wallace	Brigadier General	30 September 1943	14 May 1944	Lieutenant General	Veteran of Guadalcanal Campaign, later served as Director of Marine Corps Aviation.	
3		Francis P. Mulcahy	Major General	14 May 1944	12 September 1944	Lieutenant General	Veteran of Guadalcanal and Okinawa Campaigns, previously commanded 2nd Marine Aircraft Wing.	
4		Lawson H. M. Sanderson	Brigadier General	12 September 1944	20 March 1945	Major General	Aviation Pioneer, veteran Guadalcanal Campaign, as Commanding officer of the 4th Marine Aircraft Wing, Sanderson accepted the Japanese surrender of Wake Island in 1945.	
5		Claude A. Larkin	Major General	20 March 1945	24 July 1945	Lieutenant General	MAG-21 Commanding Officer at Ewa Field during Pearl Harbor attack.	
6		Ivan W. Miller	Brigadier General	24 July 1945	15 August 1945	Brigadier General	Veteran of Banana Wars and Pacific War.	
7		William J. Wallace	Major General	15 August 1945	August, 1946	Lieutenant General	Veteran of Guadalcanal Campaign, later served as Director of Marine Corps Aviation.	
8		Louis E. Woods	Major General	August, 1946	1 October 1947	Lieutenant General	Veteran of Guadalcanal Campaign, later served as Director of Marine Corps Aviation between 15 October 1943 – 17 July 1944.	

== Subordinate units ==
- Marine Aircraft Group 15
- Marine Aircraft Group 23
- Marine Aircraft Group 31
- Marine Aircraft Group 33
- Marine Aircraft Group 35
- Marine Aircraft Group 41
- Marine Aircraft Group 42
- Marine Aircraft Group 43
- Marine Aircraft Group 44
- Marine Aircraft Group 45
- Marine Aircraft Group 46
- Marine Aircraft Group 48
- Marine Aircraft Group 51
- Marine Aircraft Group 94

== See also ==
- United States Marine Corps Aviation
