= Stanley E. Ridderhof =

United States Marine Corps general

Stanley Emanuel Ridderhof
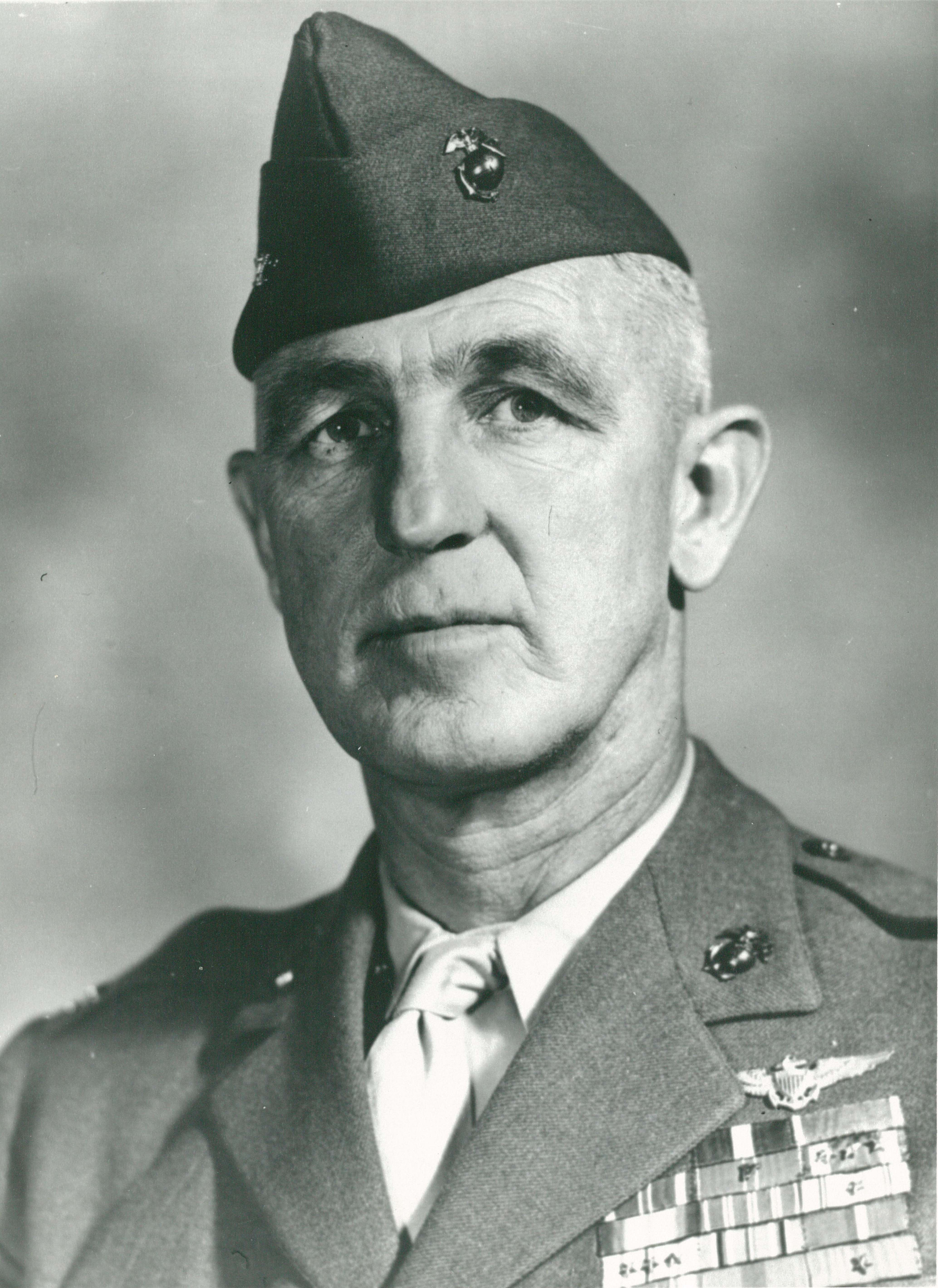
- Ridderhof as Colonel, USMC
- Born: June 23, 1896; Minneapolis, Minnesota, US
- Died: December 13, 1962 (aged 66); Newport Beach, California, US
- Burial place: Fort Rosecrans National Cemetery
- Military career
- Allegiance: United States
- Branch: United States Marine Corps
- Service years: 1917–1949
- Rank: Brigadier General
- Service number: 0-827
- Commands: MCAS El Toro; CoS, 1st MAW; CoS, Marine Air, West Coast; Marine Aircraft Group 32; Marine Utility Squadron 2 Marine Attack Squadron 231; Fighter squadron 10-M
- Conflicts: World War I Nicaraguan Campaign; World War II: Attack on Pearl Harbor; Solomon Islands campaign; Landing on Emirau; Philippines campaign
- Awards: Navy Cross; Legion of Merit; Distinguished Flying Cross; Bronze Star Medal; Air Medal (4)

Stanley Emanuel Ridderhof (June 23, 1896 – December 13, 1962) was a highly decorated naval aviator of the United States Marine Corps with the rank of brigadier general. A veteran of many conflicts, Ridderhof enlisted in the Marine Corps during World War I and received commission soon after. He then served in Nicaragua and received Navy Cross, the United States military's second-highest decoration awarded for valor in combat. During World War II, he served various assignments in the Pacific theater and received Distinguished Flying Cross and other decorations.

== Early career ==
Stanley E. Ridderhof was born on June 23, 1896, in Minneapolis, Minnesota, but his family moved to California where he enrolled the Occidental College in Los Angeles. However United States' entry into World War I changed his plans and Ridderhof dropped the college in summer 1917 and enlisted as private in the Marine Corps. He attended the boot camp at Quantico, Virginia, and subsequently was selected for the Officer Candidates School there. While at the candidate school, he also played for Marine Corps football team. Ridderhof was commissioned second lieutenant in December 1918 and was ordered to the Mare Island Navy Yard for garrison duty. While there, he was a member of Marine football team which defeated the Army's Camp Lewis eleven in the Rose Bowl Game of 1918. Ridderhof also received Marine Corps Good Conduct Medal for his enlisted service.

Following the war, Ridderhof remained in the active service and was promoted to the rank of first lieutenant on January 2, 1919. He was appointed instructor at the candidate school and served in this capacity until early 1920. Charmed by the aviation, he applied for pilot training on January 20, 1920 and was ordered for the instruction to the Naval Air Station Pensacola, Florida. Ridderhof completed the aviation training in summer of that year and was designated Naval aviator on June 7, 1920. He subsequently sailed to the Pacific area and served with the first detachment at the air station on Guam in 1921.

During the following years, he served with the various aviation units and received letter of commendation for dropping supplies from a plane to three marooned civilians during a flood in the Richmond, Virginia area in 1924. Ridderhof received second letter of commendation for safely landing a plane, which had developed serious engine trouble and was imminently in danger of burning. He was later transferred to Hawaii and attached to the newly commissioned Marine Corps Air Station Ewa.

=== Nicaragua ===
Ridderhof was ordered for temporary ground duty, when he was attached to the 1st Battalion, 11th Marine Regiment and ordered to Nicaragua on April 1, 1928. He participated in the numerous jungle patrols against Sandino bandits and later served as Operations officer of 11th Marine Regiment under Colonel Robert H. Dunlap. Ridderhof distinguished himself and received Navy Cross, the United States military's second-highest decoration awarded for valor in combat. He also received Nicaraguan Presidential Medal of Merit with Gold star and Diploma.

His official Navy Cross citation reads:

The President of the United States of America takes pleasure in presenting the Navy Cross to First Lieutenant Stanley F. Ridderhof (MCSN: 0-827), United States Marine Corps, for distinguished service in the line of his profession during continuous active service in the Northern area of Nicaragua from 1 April 1928 until 30 June 1929. First Lieutenant Ridderhof participated in and led many combat patrols that had numerous engagements with bandits during which he distinguished himself by his gallantry. On one occasion he led his patrol deep into unexplored territory, capturing and destroying an enemy supply dump containing food and clothing sufficient for one hundred men for one year, thereby inflicting heavy material damages on the bandits. As operations officer of the First Battalion, Eleventh Regiment and later as Adjutant of said regiment, he distinguished himself by his active, continuous and willing service. His display of the qualities of leadership and efficiency in administrative and executive duties were exceptional.

=== 1929-1940 ===
Ridderhof returned to the United States in July 1929 and was attached to the Fighter squadron 10-M under Captain Clayton C. Jerome. He assumed command of the squadron in November 1934 and held this command until he was ordered to the Air Corps Tactical School at Maxwell Field, Alabama in September 1935. He graduated in June 1936 along with some later famous general officers Thomas J. Cushman, Ira C. Eaker, John R. Hodge, William E. Kepner, William L. McKittrick, Elwood R. Quesada or Nathan F. Twining. Ridderhof was promoted to the rank of captain following his graduation.

== World War II ==
He was promoted to the rank of major in August 1940 while at Quantico and subsequently assumed command of Marine Attack Squadron 231 in San Diego. Ridderhof later moved with his squadron to Hawaii and was transferred to the staff of Marine Aircraft Group 21 under Lieutenant Colonel Claude A. Larkin. He was promoted to the rank of lieutenant colonel in December 1940.

Ridderhof was stationed on Hawaii during the Japanese attack on Pearl Harbor in December 1941 and took part in the defense of the harbor at Marine Corps Air Station Ewa. He was ordered to San Diego at the beginning of 1942 and appointed commanding officer of Air Base Group 2 at Naval Air Station North Island which was responsible for overhaul and repair of aircraft and engines. Ridderhof was promoted to the rank of colonel at the end of December 1942.

He was appointed commanding officer of Personnel Group at the Marine Corps Base, West Coast at Kearney-Mesa in March 1943 and served in this capacity until the beginning of October 1943. Ridderhof served in this capacity until October 1943, when he was appointed chief of staff, Marine Air, West Coast under Brigadier General William J. Wallace. Within this command, he was co-responsible for the administration, training and equipment of the Marine Aviation Units on the West Coast.

Ridderhof was ordered back to the Pacific area in June 1944 and succeeded his tactical school classmate, William L. McKittrick as chief of staff, 1st Marine Aircraft Wing. He joined the wing during the air operations at Emirau and later participated in the air combats at Solomon Islands under Major General Ralph J. Mitchell. Ridderhof received Bronze Star Medal with Combat "V" for his service in late 1944.

He was appointed Commanding Officer, Marine Aircraft Group 32 at Moret Field at Mindanao and participated in air combats over Philippines. Ridderhof received Distinguished Flying Cross for his service in this capacity and also received four awards of Air Medal during the course of war. He also received Legion of Merit by general Mitchell for his service with 1st Marine Aircraft Wing.

== Retirement ==
Following the end of the War, Ridderhof returned to the United States and became assistant to the Commanding General, Marine Air, West Coast in San Diego. He served again under Brigadier General William J. Wallace and subsequently assumed command of Marine Corps Air Station El Toro near Irvine, California. He retired from the Marine Corps on May 1, 1949, after 32 years of active service and was advanced to the rank of brigadier general on the retired list for having been specially commended in combat.

He settled in Newport Beach, California, and became vice president of Rosan Hydraulics, Inc. the manufacturer of aircraft and missile fastening parts. Ridderhof also served as councilman of Newport Beach, president of Southern California Golf Association and the Associated Chamber of Commerce of Orange County.

Brigadier General Stanley E. Ridderhof died on December 13, 1962, in Newport Beach, California, and was buried with full military honors at Fort Rosecrans National Cemetery in San Diego together with his wife Dorothy Mercer Marot. They had together two daughters.

== Decorations ==
Here is the ribbon bar of Brigadier General Stanley E. Ridderhof:

Naval Aviator Badge
1st Row	Navy Cross		Legion of Merit	
2nd Row	Distinguished Flying Cross	Bronze Star Medal with Combat "V"	Air Medal with three 5/16" Gold Stars	Marine Corps Good Conduct Medal
3rd Row	World War I Victory Medal	Second Nicaraguan Campaign Medal	American Defense Service Medal with Base clasp	Asiatic-Pacific Campaign Medal with three 3/16 inch service stars
4th Row	American Campaign Medal	World War II Victory Medal	Nicaraguan Presidential Medal of Merit with Gold star and Diploma	Philippine Liberation Medal

== See also ==
- Marine Air, West Coast
- William J. Wallace (USMC)
