= William L. McKittrick =

U.S. Marine Corps Major General

William Lake McKittrick
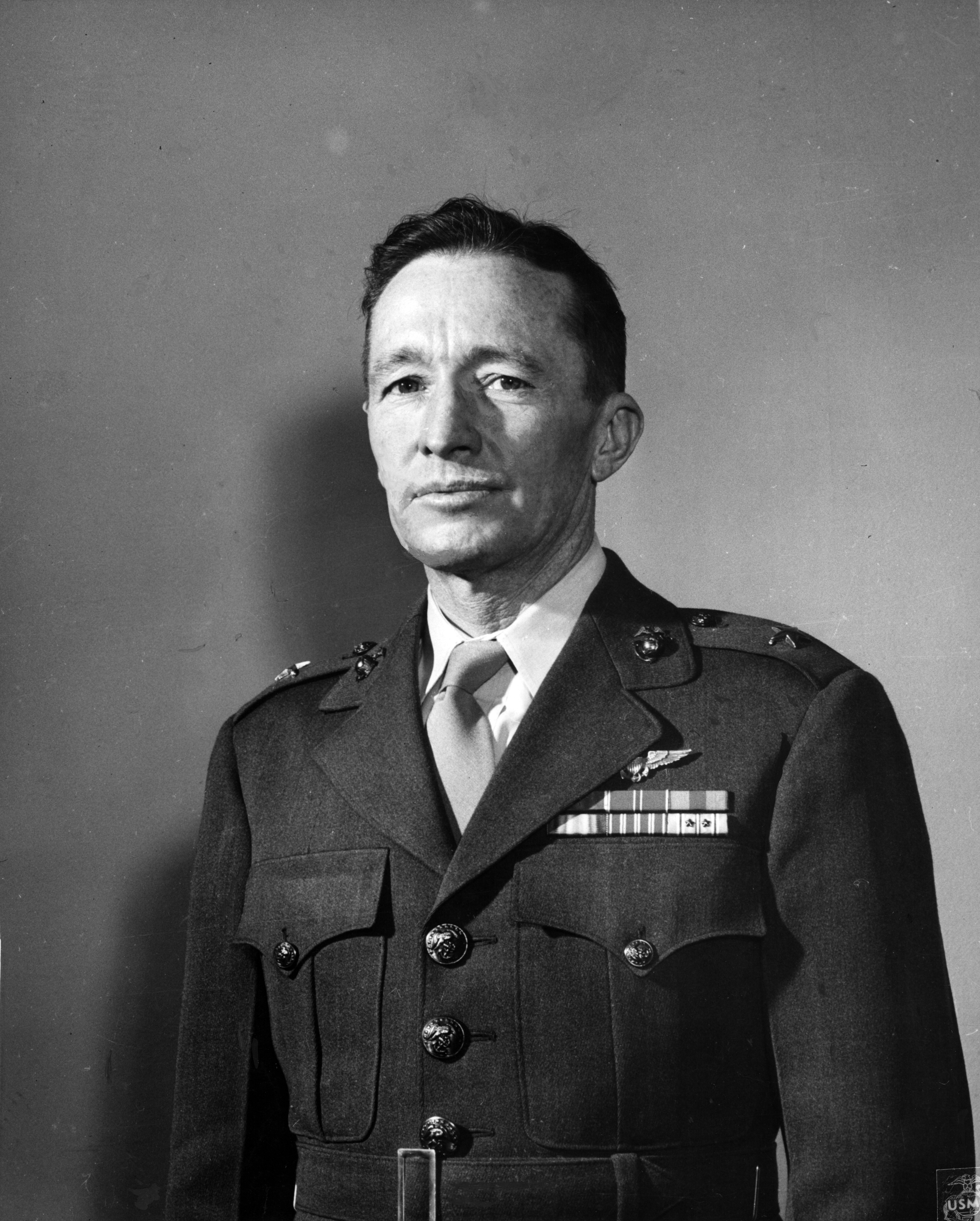
- McKittrick as Brigadier General
- Born: June 30, 1897; Pelzer, South Carolina, US
- Died: March 27, 1984 (aged 86); Pensacola, Florida, US
- Burial place: Barrancas National Cemetery
- Military career
- Allegiance: United States
- Branch: United States Marine Corps
- Service years: 1918–1951
- Rank: Major general
- Nickname: "Paddy Mac"
- Service number: 0-635
- Commands: 1st Marine Aircraft Wing; 2nd Marine Aircraft Wing; MCAS Cherry Point; Marine Aircraft Group 24; VO-7M; VMF-1
- Conflicts: World War I; Banana Wars; Dominican intervention; Haitian intervention; Nicaraguan intervention; World War II; Operation Cartwheel; Bougainville Campaign; Bombing of Rabaul; Landing on Emirau; Marianas campaign; Battle of Saipan; Battle of Tinian
- Awards: Legion of Merit (2); Bronze Star Medal

William Lake McKittrick (June 30, 1897 – March 27, 1984) was a decorated aviation officer of the United States Marine Corps with the rank of major general. He is most noted for his service as commanding officer of the Marine Aircraft Group 24 during the Bougainville Campaign and later as Air Defense Commander during the Battle of Saipan.

== Early career ==
McKittrick was born on June 30, 1897, in Pelzer, South Carolina, and later attended The Citadel in Charleston, South Carolina, where he graduated in 1918. Following his graduation, he enlisted in the Marine Corps as private on March 10, 1918, and following his quick promotion to corporal, he was attached to the School of Application for officer training. McKittrick was commissioned second lieutenant in the Marine Corps Reserve on December 16, 1918, and subsequently assigned as line officer to 15th Marine Regiment at Marine Barracks Quantico. The 15th Marines were assigned to the 2nd Provisional Marine Brigade under Brigadier General Logan Feland and sailed for Santo Domingo in February 1919. He saw some action during the combats against Dominican rebels and finally was ordered back to United States in October 1921.

Upon his return from his first expeditionary duty, he was transferred to the Marine barracks at Naval Station Key West, Florida. After nine months of service there, impressed by the Aviation units, McKittrick applied for the pilot training in July 1922. He was assigned as Student Naval aviator to the pilot training at Naval Air Station Pensacola, Florida and finally received his wings in February 1923.

His first aviation duty was at Marine Barracks Quantico, where he remained until July 1923. McKittrick was subsequently attached to the Observation Squadron 2 within First Marine Brigade and flew for Haiti. During his service there, he was promoted to the rank of first lieutenant in November 1923. McKittrick returned stateside in August 1925 and following the service with Fighter Squadron Two at Quantico, he was appointed a student at Advanced Flying School at Kelly Field, Texas.

Following the graduation from the flying school in April 1926, McKittrick returned to the Observation Squadron 2 at Quantico. During the spring of 1927, he was ordered to Managua, Nicaragua, for aviation duty. McKittrick was ordered to the Naval Air Station Pensacola, Florida, in August 1927 and served as an instructor until July 1929, when he was transferred to the Naval Air Station San Diego. He returned to Nicaragua with the Second Marine Brigade in May 1931 and participated in the patrol aviation duties as pilot and engineering officer until June 1932. McKittrick distinguished himself in combat and received the Letter of commendation by the Secretary of the Navy and also Nicaraguan Cross of Valor and Diploma.

First Lieutenant McKittrick was assigned as a student at the Company Officers Course at Marine Corps Schools Quantico and upon his graduation in May 1933, he was appointed VO-7M Squadron Commander at Marine Corps Air Station, Quantico. While in this capacity, he was promoted to the rank of captain on November 30, 1934, and was sent for instruction at Air Corps Tactical School at Maxwell Field, Alabama, in August 1935. He graduated in June 1936 along with some later famous general officers Thomas J. Cushman, Ira C. Eaker, John R. Hodge, William E. Kepner, Elwood R. Quesada, Stanley E. Ridderhof or Nathan F. Twining.

In June 1936, recently graduated McKittrick was appointed officer in charge of the aerial operations and training at Marine Corps Air Station, Quantico. He later served also as Marine Fighting Squadron 1 (VMF-1) commander at the same air station and was promoted to the rank of major in June 1938.

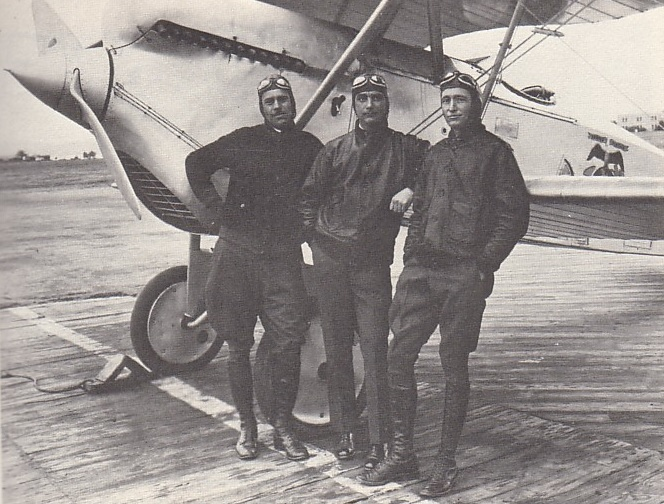
Three future Marine Corps Generals: 1st Lt. Christian F. Schilt, Capt. James T. Moore and William L. McKittrick during theirs interwar service.

== World War II ==
McKittrick was transferred to the Headquarters Marine Corps in Washington, D.C., and attached to the War Plans Section of the Division of Plans and Policies in July 1939. He subsequently sailed to Cairo, Egypt, and served as Aviation Observer for next two years. McKittrick returned to the Headquarters Marine Corps in November 1941 and following his promotion to the rank of lieutenant colonel in February 1942, he was appointed commanding officer of Marine Aircraft Group 24 at Marine Corps Air Station Ewa, Hawaii.

While in this capacity, he was promoted to the rank of colonel on October 5, 1942, and subsequently sailed for Bougainville in September 1943. McKittrick directed air operations during the Bombing of Rabaul in late 1943 and early 1944 and received the Legion of Merit with Combat "V" for his work in this capacity.

Towards the end of March 1944, McKittrick organized the air command for the upcoming operation on Emirau. The island was already unopposed and its capture was easy mission. McKittrick was then appointed chief of staff of the 1st Marine Aircraft Wing under Major General James T. Moore. He remained in this capacity until 16 June 1944, when he was succeeded by his tactical school classmate, Colonel Stanley E. Ridderhof and subsequently appointed Air Defense Commander during the Battle of Saipan. McKittrick continued in the similar assignment during the subsequent Battle of Tinian at the end of July. In these campaigns, he directed combat air patrols, bombing and strafing missions and later received his second Legion of Merit for his work.

Colonel McKittrick was transferred stateside in November 1944 and assigned again to the Headquarters Marine Corps. He was subsequently appointed assistant to the Director of Marine Corps Aviation under Major General Field Harris. While served in this assignment, McKittrick was promoted to the rank of brigadier general on January 20, 1945.

== Postwar assignments ==
General McKittrick remained on with the office of Director of Marine Corps Aviation until June 1947, when he was transferred to Guam and appointed commanding general of the 1st Marine Aircraft Wing stationed there. The 1st Marine Wing has been transferred to the United States in during the autumn 1947 and McKittrick stayed on Guam as commanding officer of the Marine Aircraft Group 24 (Reinforced). He returned to the United States with MAG 24 (reinforced) in June 1949 and subsequently was appointed chief of staff and inspector general of the Department of Pacific in San Francisco under Major General Keller E. Rockey in July 1949.

After one year of service there, he was transferred to the Marine Corps Air Station Cherry Point, North Carolina and assumed Command of the Air station. Soon after, McKittrick was appointed commanding general of the 2nd Marine Aircraft Wing and deputy commander, air, Fleet Marine Force Atlantic under Lieutenant General LeRoy P. Hunt.

McKittrick finally retired from the Marine Corps in October 1951 and was advanced to the rank of major general for having been specially commended in combat. He resided in Pensacola, Florida, and died on March 27, 1984. General McKittrick is buried at Barrancas National Cemetery together with his wife Edith I. McKittrick (1907–1996).

== Decorations ==
Here is the ribbon bar of Major General William L. McKittrick:

Naval Aviator Badge
1st Row	Legion of Merit with Combat "V" and Gold Star	Bronze Star Medal		Marine Corps Expeditionary Medal with one star
2nd Row	World War I Victory Medal	Second Nicaraguan Campaign Medal	American Defense Service Medal	American Campaign Medal
3rd Row	Asiatic-Pacific Campaign Medal with three service star	World War II Victory Medal	National Defense Service Medal	Nicaraguan Cross of Valor and Diploma
