= Marine Aircraft Group 32 =

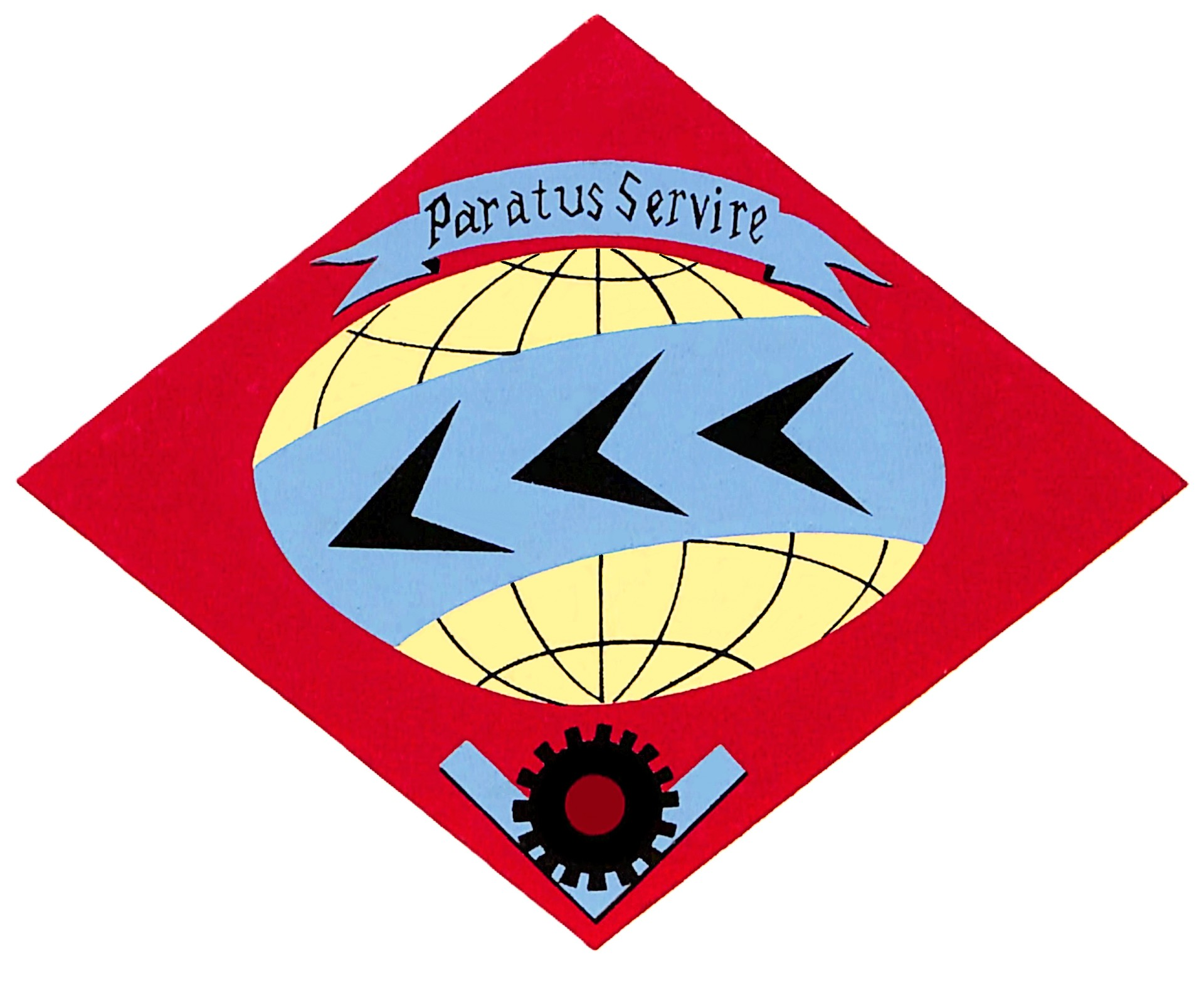
- MAG-32 insignia from 1956
- Active: February 1, 1943 – April 1947; March 8, 1952 - April 30, 1993
- Country: United States
- Allegiance: United States of America
- Branch: United States Marine Corps
- Role: Fighter/Attack Aircraft Group
- Motto: Parati Servire
- Engagements: World War II; Philippines campaign, 1944-45

Commanders
- Notable commanders: Clayton C. Jerome; John Lucian Smith; Stanley E. Ridderhof; Hugh M. Elwood

Marine Aircraft Group 32 (MAG-32) was a United States Marine Corps aviation unit established during World War II.

== History ==
=== World War II ===
Marine Aircraft Group 32 was commissioned on 1 February 1943 at Marine Corps Air Station Cherry Point, North Carolina. The group's squadrons trained there until January 1944 when they were ordered to the West Coast to prepare for follow on movement to the South Pacific. The group next went to Marine Corps Air Station Ewa, Hawaii where they remained until October 1944. November saw them move to Emirau as they prepared to support the campaign to recapture the Philippines.

MAG-32 arrived on Mangaldan on 27 January 1945 where they became part of Marine Air Groups, Dagupan (MAGSDAGUPAN) along with Marine Aircraft Group 24 (MAG-24). MAGSDAGUPAN fell under neath the 308th Bombardment Wing of the United States Army Air Forces which was supporting the 6th Army on Luzon. Portions of the group went ashore with the assault troops on Zamboanga on 10 March 1945. Two days later they were operating out of an expeditionary airfield. During this time they became part of Marine Air Groups Zamboanga (MAGSZAM) along with Marine Aircraft Group 12 and Air Warning Squadron 4 (AWS-4). The SBD Dauntless aircraft of MAG-32 arrived on 23 March and began providing close air support. The first major operation that they supported was the landing of the 41st Infantry Division on Jolo Island on 9 April. Forty four dive bombers from MAG-32 were directed against Japanese positions by tactical air control parties. The group also went on to cover amphibious landing on the islands of Parang-Cotabato, Sibago, Macajalar and Sarangani.

MAGSZAM was finally dissolved on 30 August 1945. During the recapture of the Philippines beginning in January 1945, MAG-32 and MAG-24 would fly a total of 8,842 combat sorties and drop more than 19,000 bombs as part of the Fifth Air Force in support of the Sixth Army.

Following the end of World War II, MAG-32 participated in the occupation of Northern China. The group returned to Marine Corps Air Station Miramar in June 1946 and was deactivated in April 1947 at Marine Corps Air Station El Toro.

=== World War II Group Structure, Commanders, and Battle Honors ===
Group

Marine Aircraft Group 32 (MAG-32)

Group Echelon (Philippines Campaign: 27 Jan 45–22 Feb 45)
Flight Echelon (Philippines Campaign: 31 Jan 45–22 Feb 45)
Advance Echelon (Philippines Campaign: 10 Mar 45–4 Jul 45)
Rear Echelon (Philippines Campaign: 17 Mar 45–4 Jul 45)

- CO, MAG-32

Col Clayton C. Jerome (until July 1945)
Col Stanley E. Ridderhof

- ExO, MAG-32

LCol John L. Smith

- GruOpsO, MAG-32

LCol Wallace T. Scott

- CO, Hq Sqn-32, MAG-32

Capt Harold L. Maryott (____–17 Mar 45)
1Lt Robert W. Mazur (18 Mar 45–____)

- CO, SMS-32, MAG-32

Maj Jack D. Kane

Squadrons
- Marine Scout-Bomber Squadron 142 (VMSB-142) "Wild Horses"

Ground Echelon (Philippines Campaign: 22 Jan 45–4 Jul 45)
Flight Echelon (Consolidation of the Solomons: 9 Feb 44–26 Apr 44, & 19 Sep 44–19 Dec 44), (Philippines Campaign: 27 Jan 45–4 Jul 45)
CO, VMSB-142

Maj Robert H. Richard (____–9 Jun 44)
Capt Hoyle R. Barr (18 Jul 44–8 Jun 45)
Maj James L. Fritsche (9 Jun 45–____)

- Marine Scout-Bomber Squadron 243 (VMSB-243) "Flying Goldbricks"

Ground Echelon (Philippines Campaign: 22 Jan 45–4 Jul 45)
Flight Echelon (Treasury-Bougainville Operation: 20 Nov 43–15 Dec 43), (Consolidation of the Solomons: 16 Dec 43–27 Dec 43; 16 Jun 44–23 Dec 44), (Bismarck Archipelago Operation: 17 Mar 44–27 Apr 44), (Philippines Campaign: 31 Jan 45–4 Jul 45)
CO, VMSB-243

Maj Thomas J. Ahern (____–3 Oct 44)
Maj Joseph W. Kean, Jr. (13 Oct 44–____)

- Marine Scout-Bomber Squadron 244 (VMSB-244) "Bombing Banshees"

Ground Echelon (Philippines Campaign: 22 Jan 45–4 Jul 45)
Flight Echelon (New Georgia Operation: 18 Oct 43–29 Nov 43), (Bismarck Archipelago Operation: 10 Feb 44–22 Mar 44), (Consolidation of the Solomons: 17 May 44–24 Jun 44, & 31 Jul 44–13 Nov 44), (Philippines Campaign: 31 Jan 45–4 Jul 45)
CO, VMSB-244

Maj Robert J. Johnson (____–25 Jan 44)
Maj Harry W. Reed (25 Jan 44–17 Apr 44)
Capt Richard Belyea (18 Apr 44–1 Jul 44)
Maj Frank R. Porter, Jr. (2 Jul 44–____)
Maj Vance H. Hudgins (____–____)

=== 1950s to 1990s ===
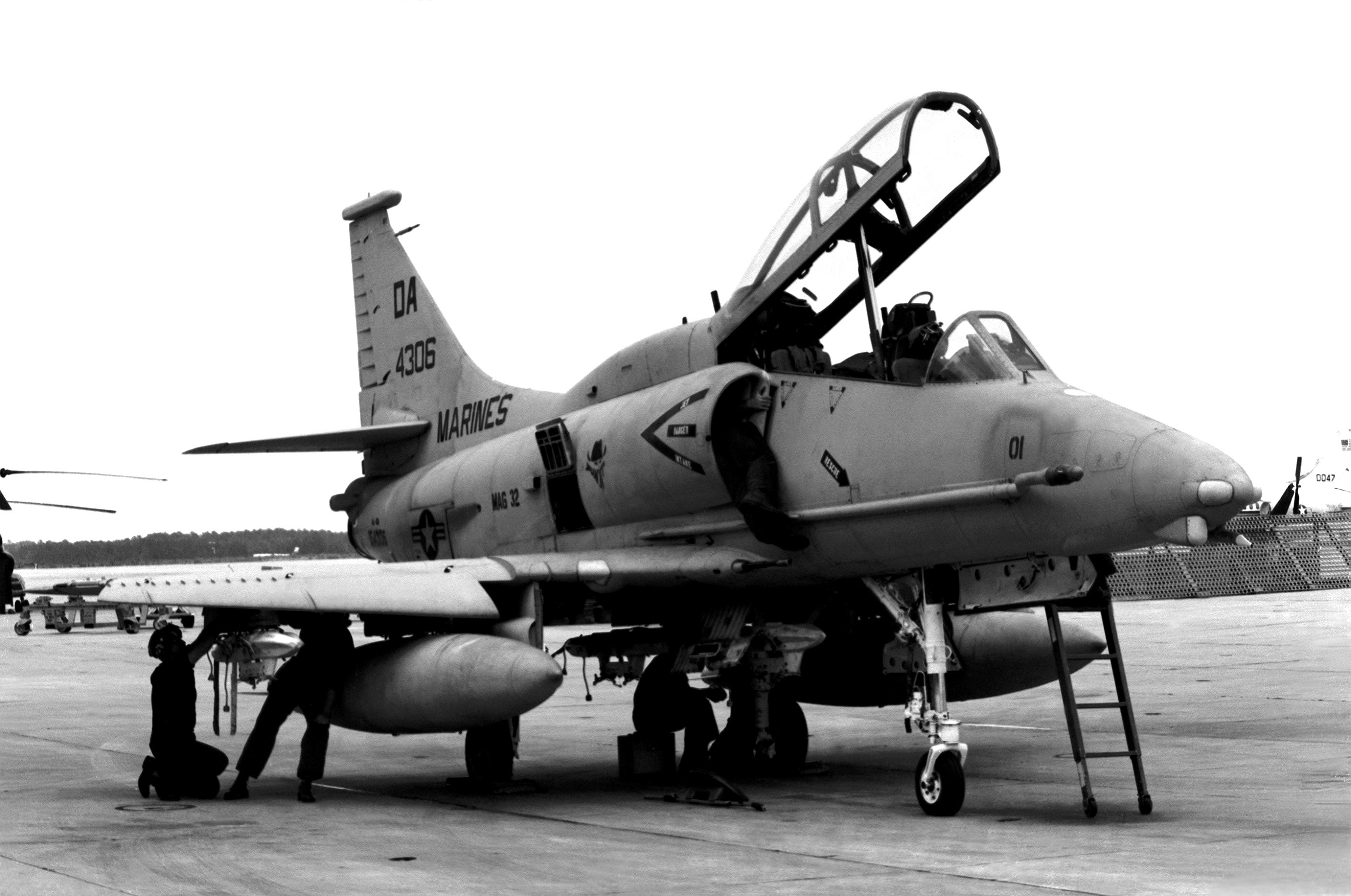
OA-4M Skyhawk of MAG-32 in 1990

The last two Marine Corps OA-4M Skyhawks, which were from MAG-32, flew their last flight from Marine Corps Air Station Cherry Point to NAS Patuxent River on 6 July 1990. In the 1970s Mag 32 was based in MCAS Beaufort SC. Had A-4 Skyhawks, and AV8a Harriers. Then left to MCAS Cherry Point.

== Unit awards ==
- Navy Unit Commendation

== Gallery ==
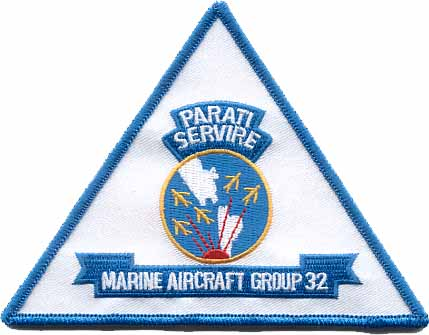
Squadron insignia from the 1980s

== See also ==
- List of United States Marine Corps aircraft squadrons
- List of United States Marine Corps aircraft groups
