= VMF-111 =

Marine Fighting Squadron 111
- VMF-111 Insignia
- Active: Sep 1, 1925 – Nov 26, 1945; Jun 1, 1948 – Oct 22, 1965
- Country: United States
- Branch: USMC
- Type: Fighter squadron
- Role: Air interdiction
- Part of: Inactive
- Nickname(s): "Rojo Diablos" (1930s) "Devil Dogs" (WWII)
- Tail Code: 5D
- Engagements: World War II * Solomon Islands Campaign

Commanders
- Notable commanders: Christian F. Schilt; William L. McKittrick

Aircraft flown
- Fighter: Vought VE-7; Boeing FB-1; Curtiss F6C-4; Curtiss F7C-1 Seahawk; Boeing F4B-4; Grumman F3F-2; Grumman F4F Wildcat; Vought F4U Corsair; North American AF-1E Fury; Vought F-8 Crusader

Marine Fighting Squadron 111 (VMF-111) was a reserve fighter squadron in the United States Marine Corps. Nicknamed the "Devil Dogs", the squadron was one of the first aviation squadrons in the Marine Corps and gained national attention in the 1930s as the Marine Corps show unit. The squadron fought in World War II and was later transferred to the Reserves where they fell under the command of Marine Aircraft Group 41 (MAG-41) and the 4th Marine Aircraft Wing (4th MAW) while stationed at Naval Air Station Dallas, Texas. They were decommissioned on 22 October 1965.

== History ==
=== Early years ===
Marine Fighting Squadron 2 (VF-2M) was commissioned on September 1, 1925 at Marine Corps Base Quantico, Virginia. The directive authorizing the formation of the squadron stated, "The primary mission of this squadron will be the training and perfecting of pursuit pilots and the testing and development of pursuit aircraft." They were redesignated VF-9M on July 1, 1927 which was changed again to VF-5M on July 1, 1928.

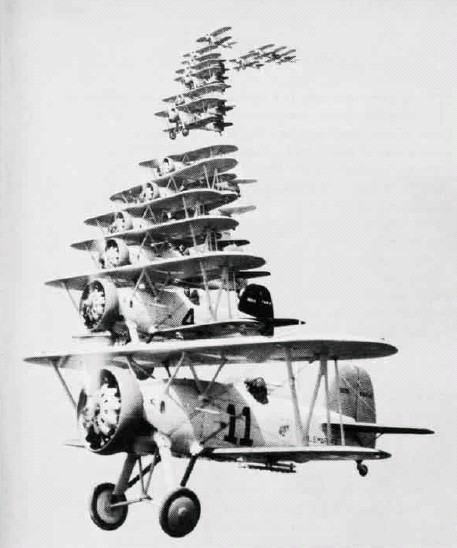
17 F4B-4s of VF-9M in the early 1930s

Because they were located so close to Washington D.C., the squadron became the "show unit" for Marine aviation. The squadron reverted to the previous designation of VF-9M on 1 August 1930. In 1937, after a stint aboard the USS Saratoga (CV-3) under the command of then Captain Bull Halsey, VF-9M was again redesignated, becoming VMF-1 on July 1, 1937. In 1938, the squadron turned in its Boeing F4B-4s for brand new Grumman F3F-2s. The squadron finally became VMF-111 on July 1, 1941 during the massive expansion of the Marine Corps that began just prior to World War II.

=== World War II ===
At the time of the Attack on Pearl Harbor, VMF-111 pilots were flying the Grumman F4F Wildcat. On 10 March 1942, the squadron arrived at Tafuna Airfield on Tutuila island, its new base of operations. They were the first Marine squadron to operate in Samoa. and eventually were relocated to Faleolo Airfield on Upolu Island after SeeBees completed Feleolo Airfield in July 1942. They spent the next year as part of the Samoa Defense Garrison Area and finally transitioned to the Vought F4U Corsair in early 1943. The squadron remained in Samoa until 1944, serving as a replacement pool for other squadrons engaged in the Solomon Islands Campaign.

VMF-111 left Samoa in January 1944 for the Central Pacific and participated in raids against bypassed Japanese garrisons for the rest of the war. It was during this time that the squadron, under the command of Major William E. Classen, made the first experimental bombing run with F4U Corsairs when eight of their aircraft struck heavy anti-aircraft positions on Mili Atoll with thousand pound bombs Following the war the squadron returned to the States where it was deactivated on November 26, 1945.

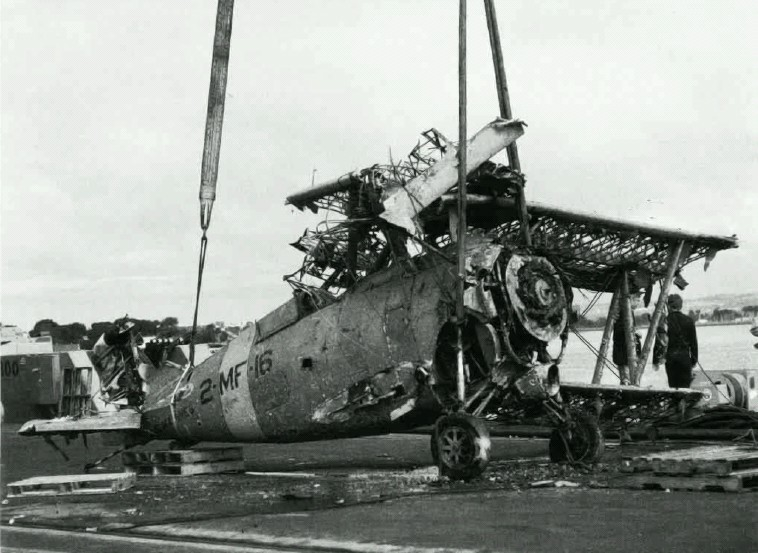
Grumman F3F-2 (BuNo 0976) after retrieval in 1990. It was lost at sea while attempting to land on USS Saratoga on 29 August 1940 while with VMF-2. It has since been restored and is currently on display at the National Naval Aviation Museum in Pensacola, Fla.

=== Post war years ===
Reactivated on June 1, 1948 as part of the Marine Air Reserve, VMF-111 was stationed at Naval Air Station Dallas. The squadron was recalled to active duty on July 23, 1950 due to the Korean War but did not participate in any combat operations. The squadron assumed its World War II role of training pilots. The squadron was released from active duty in July 1953 and remained at NAS Dallas until its deactivation on October 22, 1965. Upon deactivation, their personnel and aircraft were turned over to VMF-112.

== Squadron Aces ==
- George L. Hallowell

== Squadron Commanding Officers ==
- As VF-2 –
- 1st Lt Lawson H. M. Sanderson 1 September 1925 to 1 November 1926
- 1st Lt Jay D. Swartout 2 November 1926 to 6 January 1927
- Chief Marine Gunner Elmo Reagan 7 January 1927 to 2 March 1927
- Capt William T. Evans 3 March 1927 to 7 June 1927
- 1st Lt Vernon M. Guymon 8 June 1927 to 3 October 1927

== See also ==
- United States Marine Corps Aviation
- List of active United States Marine Corps aircraft squadrons
- List of decommissioned United States Marine Corps aircraft squadrons
