= Vernon M. Guymon =

United States Marine Corps general

Vernon Melvin Guymon
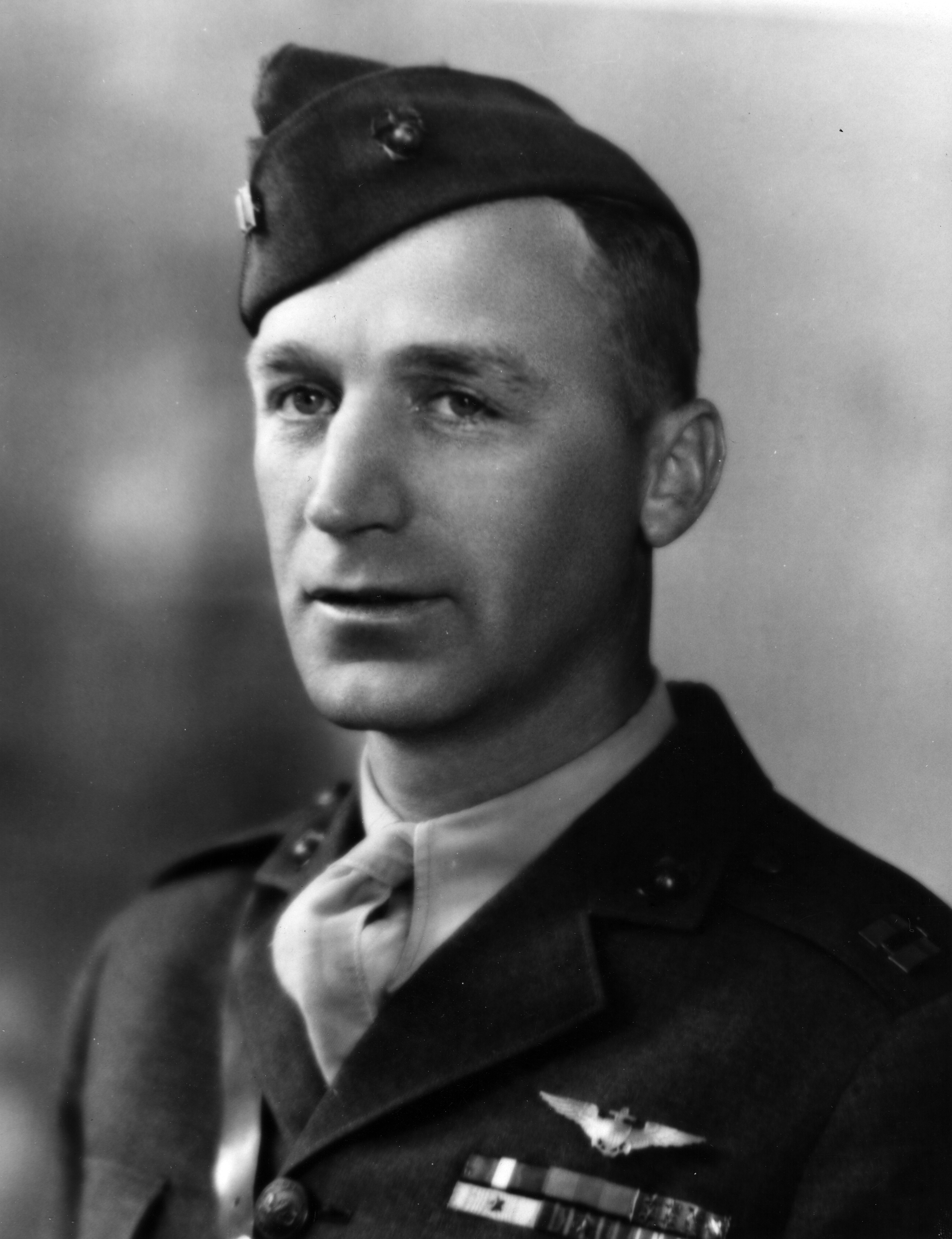
- Guymon as Captain, USMC.
- Born: November 1, 1898; Rexburg, Idaho, US
- Died: April 5, 1965 (aged 66); San Diego, California, US
- Burial place: Fort Rosecrans National Cemetery
- Military career
- Allegiance: United States
- Branch: United States Marine Corps
- Service years: 1917–1919, 1921-1949
- Rank: Brigadier General
- Service number: 0-2472
- Commands: Deputy Commander, 2nd MAW; Chief of Staff, 1st MAW; Marine Aircraft Group 12; Marine Glider Group 71; Marine Attack Squadron 131; Fighting plane squadron 10-M; Marine Observation Squadron 6
- Conflicts: World War I: Battle of Belleau Wood; Battle of Château-Thierry; Battle of Soissons; Battle of Blanc Mont Ridge; Meuse-Argonne Offensive; Banana Wars: Haitian Campaign; Nicaraguan Campaign; World War II: Solomon Islands campaign; Landing on Emirau; Chinese Civil War
- Awards: Navy Cross; Silver Star; Legion of Merit; Purple Heart (2)

Vernon Melvin Guymon (November 1, 1898 – April 5, 1965) was a highly decorated mustang officer and naval aviator of the United States Marine Corps with the rank of brigadier general. A veteran of many conflicts, Guymon served as gunnery sergeant with 6th Marines during World War I, later commissioned and trained as naval aviator he distinguished himself during the combats in Nicaragua and received Navy Cross, the United States military's second-highest decoration awarded for valor in combat. During World War II, he served as commanding officer of Marine Glider Group 71 and Marine Aircraft Group 12 in the Pacific theater and retired as brigadier general in 1949.

== Early career and World War I ==
Guymon was born on November 2, 1898, in Rexburg, Idaho, and attended high school in Salt Lake City, Utah. Following the United States entry into the World War I in April 1917, Guymon decided to enlist in the Marine Corps as private during the same month and was ordered to the boot camp at Quantico, Virginia. Upon completion of his training, he was attached to the 79th Company, 2nd Battalion, 6th Marine Regiment at Quantico and sailed to France in January 1918. He served in the same company with some later marine corps generals: Graves B. Erskine, Charles I. Murray or William A. Worton.

His regiment arrived at Saint-Nazaire and after more of training was deployed to the trenches in the Toulouse sector near Verdun in March 1918. Guymon, who had in the meantime been promoted to sergeant, took part in the battle of Belleau Wood in June 1918, where he distinguished himself by delivering a message while under heavy machine gun fire. This resulted in the arrival of reinforcements, and materially aided in holding the captured position. He was slightly wounded and subsequently decorated with the Silver Star for his bravery.

Guymon remained with 79th Company during the assault on Soissons at the end of July 1918 and was wounded again. He was evacuated to the rear for treatment, and remained there until the mid-September 1918. Guymon was meantime promoted to the rank of Gunnery sergeant and participated in the battle of Blanc Mont Ridge in October 1918.

He was promoted to the temporary rank of second lieutenant in December 1918 and received French Fourragère and Croix de Guerre with Guilt Star for bravery by the Government of France. Guymon also later received two awards of the Purple Heart for his wounds.

== Interwar period ==
=== First Aviation duty ===
Following the end of the War, Guymon served with his unit during the Occupation of the Rhineland in Coblenz until the summer of 1919, and sailed back to the United States in August of that year. He arrived back to Quantico at the beginning of August and took part in the welcome parade in New York City. Guymon was discharged from the Marine Corps at his own request on August 21, 1919.

Guymon reentered the Marine Corps service in May 1921 with the permanent rank of second lieutenant and was ordered to the Basic School at Philadelphia Navy Yard for additional officer training, after which he was ordered to Buffalo, New York for duty at the Marine recruiting station. Guymon sailed to Haiti in July 1924 with the 1st Marine Brigade under the command of Brigadier General Ben H. Fuller and participated in the skirmishes with Haitian rebels called "Cacos".

He returned to the United States in January 1925 and joined the First Aviation Group at Quantico, Virginia and, charmed by flying, applied for aviation training. His application was approved and Guymon was sent to the Naval Air Station Pensacola, Florida in February 1926. He completed the training in October of that year and was designated Naval aviator on November 15.

=== Nicaragua ===
His first aviation duty began with Aircraft Squadrons, East Coast Expeditionary Forces at Quantico and Guymon joined the newly formed Observation Squadron 4 in May 1927. Guymon was promoted to the rank of first lieutenant and assumed temporary duty with Aircraft Squadrons, 2nd Marine Brigade under Brigadier General Logan Feland in December 1927. He subsequently sailed for Nicaragua to support Marine units in the combats with Sandino bandits as pilot of Vought O2U Corsair with Franklin G. Cowie (later Brigadier general) as observer.

Guymon participated in the combats until May 26, 1929, and received Navy Cross, the United States military's second-highest decoration awarded for valor in combat. He also received Nicaraguan Presidential Medal of Merit with Gold star and Diploma.

His official Navy Cross citation reads:

The President of the United States of America takes pleasure in presenting the Navy Cross to First Lieutenant Vernon M. Guymon (MCSN: 0-2472), United States Marine Corps, for distinguished service in the line of his profession as an airplane pilot attached to the Aircraft Squadrons, Second Brigade, U.S.M.C., operating against hostile bandits in the Republic of Nicaragua from 31 December 1927 to 26 May 1929. During this period First Lieutenant Guymon performed 1021 hours of flying time over heavily wooded and mountainous country in fair weather and foul for the purpose of bringing supplies to and removing the sick and wounded from distant and isolated outposts. When contact was made with bandit forces that occupied this part of the country he displayed commendable courage and zeal in promptly and effectively returning their fire.

=== 1929-1939 ===
Guymon returned to the United States in June 1929 and assumed command of Marine Observation Squadron 6 at Quantico. He was relieved by first lieutenant William G. Manley at the beginning of September of that year and ordered to the Marine Corps Schools, Quantico for instruction. Guymon completed Company Officers' Course and joined Fighting plane squadron 10-M at San Diego, California in August 1930. He assumed command of the Squadron in October of that year and received promotion to the rank of captain in January 1931.

While commanded this squadron, Guymon received Herbert Schiff memorial trophy from the Secretary of the Navy Charles Francis Adams in February 1933. The Herbert Schiff trophy is awarded to the naval aircraft squadron or unit having to its credit the most flying hours free from accident to personnel or damage to material. Capt. Guymon's squadron flew a total of 1862 hours without mishap. Guymon later led his squadron during Los Angeles National Air Races in July 1933, where they demonstrated to the Services and the nation the daring and skill of Marine aviators.

He left squadron in San Diego in September 1934 and enrolled the Air Corps Tactical School at Maxwell Field, Alabama. He graduated in June 1935 along with some later famous general officers Muir S. Fairchild, Barney M. Giles, Haywood S. Hansell, Laurence S. Kuter, Lawson H. M. Sanderson, Hoyt Vandenberg or William J. Wallace.

Guymon then returned to Fighting plane squadron 10-M at San Diego and assumed again command of the squadron in August of that year. His squadron served aboard the aircraft carriers USS Lexington and USS Saratoga during Fleet Problem XVII in Panama Canal Zone in spring 1936 and later returned to San Diego.

He was ordered to Washington, D.C., in May 1937 and served for two years with the division of aviation, Headquarters Marine Corps under Colonel Ross E. Rowell. Guymon was meantime promoted to the rank of major and finally left Washington in July 1939 for Senior course at Marine Corps Schools, Quantico. He completed the course one year later and assumed command of Marine Attack Squadron 131.

== World War II ==
Guymon was promoted to the rank of lieutenant colonel in November 1941 and ordered to the Motorless Flight Institute in Chicago, Illinois for flight training on gliders, which included 30 flying hours. Fifteen hours were airplane tow time while the remaining fifteen were split between winch towing and car towing. The course included cross—country towing, towing to strange airports, and release and landing in simulation of tactical maneuvers.

Following the completion of the training, Guymon assumed command of newly created Marine Glider Group 71 at Parris Island, South Carolina and moved with his command to Marine Corps Air Station Eagle Mountain Lake, Texas in November 1942. He continued in the training of his pilots and received promotion to the rank of colonel on October 1, 1942.

However marine glider program was cancelled in June 1943 due to three official reasons: gliders were not arriving from the factories in sufficient numbers, islands in the Pacific were considered not suitable for their use, and too many Navy flyers were being diverted into the glider program.

Guymon was then transferred to Marine Corps Air Base Kearny Mesa near San Diego in July 1943, before sailed to the Pacific area during the same month. He was attached to the 4th Marine Aircraft Wing under Brigadier General Harold D. Campbell at Samoa as the part of Aircraft Defense Force, Samoan Area, within Defense Forces, Samoan Group under Major General Charles F. B. Price.

Colonel Guymon served as chief of staff until November 1943, when he assumed command of Marine Aircraft Group 12 and led his unit during the air operations during the Emirau campaign and in the Solomon Islands. He was decorated with Legion of Merit with Combat "V" for his service in the Pacific area and returned to the United States at the beginning of November 1944.

He then served on the staff of commanding general of Aircraft within Fleet Marine Force, Pacific under Major General Francis P. Mulcahy. Guymon remained in this capacity until the end of War and served twice as the representative of this command in connection with postwar operations and employment of the Marine Corps Air Station Ewa, Hawaii and later in the Marianas area.

== Later career and retirement ==
Guymon was later appointed deputy commander, 2nd Marine Aircraft Wing and then sailed to China as chief of staff, 1st Marine Aircraft Wing under his old classmate from Tactical school, Lawson H. M. Sanderson. He participated in the air operations during the Chinese civil war and was decorated with the Order of the Cloud and Banner with Special Rosette (6th Class) by the Government of Republic of China.

He returned to the United States in August 1947 and served at Headquarters Marine Corps as member of Naval Examining board. His main duty was to study the records of all officers who wanted to stay in the service and subsequently made recommendations based on this records. Guymon retired on March 1, 1949, after almost 30 years of active service and was advanced to the rank of brigadier general on the retired list for having been specially commended in combat.

Guymon settled in Coronado, California, with his wife Natalie K. Guymon and was active in Coronado Rotary Club there. Brigadier General Vernon M. Guymon died on April 5, 1965, in Naval Medical Center San Diego and is buried together with his wife at Fort Rosecrans National Cemetery, San Diego.

== Decorations ==
Here is the ribbon bar of Brigadier General Vernon M. Guymon:

Naval Aviator Badge
1st Row	Navy Cross	Silver Star	Legion of Merit with Combat "V"	Purple Heart with Oak leaf cluster
2nd Row	World War I Victory Medal with four battle clasps	Army of Occupation of Germany Medal	Marine Corps Expeditionary Medal	Second Nicaraguan Campaign Medal
3rd Row	American Defense Service Medal with Base clasp	American Campaign Medal	Asiatic-Pacific Campaign Medal with two 3/16 inch service stars	World War II Victory Medal
4th Row	China Service Medal	French Croix de guerre 1914–1918 with Gilt Star	Nicaraguan Presidential Medal of Merit with Gold star and Diploma	Order of the Cloud and Banner with Special Rosette (6th Class) (Republic of China)
