= VMFA-232 =

United States Marine Corps fighter attack squadron

Marine Fighter Attack Squadron 232
- VMFA-232 insignia
- Active: 1 September 1925 – 16 November 1945; 3 June 1948 – present
- Country: United States
- Branch: United States Marine Corps
- Type: Fighter/Attack
- Role: Close air support Air interdiction Aerial reconnaissance
- Part of: Marine Aircraft Group 11; 3rd Marine Aircraft Wing
- Garrison/HQ: Marine Corps Air Station Miramar
- Nickname: Red Devils
- Motto: "The Devil made me do it."
- Tail Code: WT
- Engagements: World War II; Vietnam War; Operation Desert Storm; Operation Iraqi Freedom; 2003 Invasion of Iraq; Operation Enduring Freedom

Commanders
- Current commander: LtCol Gavin T. Robillard
- Notable commanders: Francis P. Mulcahy; William J. Wallace; Clayton C. Jerome; Vernon M. Guymon; Hayne D. Boyden; Stanley E. Ridderhof; Ira L. Kimes; Richard C. Mangrum; William L. Nyland

Aircraft flown
- Bomber: Great Lakes BG; Douglas SBD Dauntless; Grumman TBF-1C Avenger
- Fighter: Vought VE-7; Boeing FB-1; Boeing FB-5; Curtiss F6C-4; Boeing F4B-4; Vought F4U Corsair; North American FJ Fury; Vought F-8 Crusader; McDonnell-Douglas F-4 Phantom II; F/A-18 Hornet; F-35C Lightning II

Marine Fighter Attack Squadron 232 (VMFA-232) is a United States Marine Corps F/A-18 Hornet squadron. Nicknamed the "Red Devils", the squadron is based at Marine Corps Air Station Miramar, California and falls under the command of Marine Aircraft Group 11 (MAG-11) and the 3rd Marine Aircraft Wing (3rd MAW). The Red Devils are the oldest and most decorated fighter squadron in the Marine Corps.

== History ==
=== The early years ===
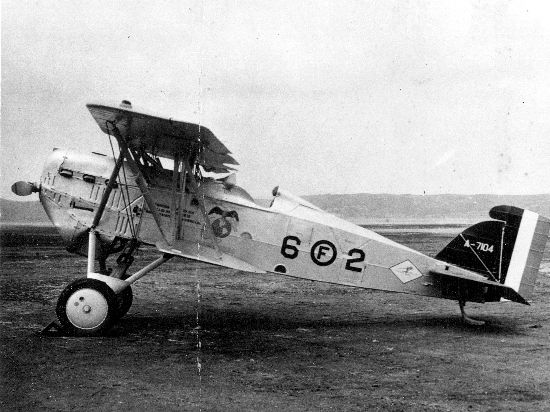
FB-5 with VF-3M insignia

VMFA-232 can trace its lineage back to VF-3M, which was commissioned on 1 September 1925, at Naval Air Station San Diego, California. Originally equipped with Vought VE-7s, the squadron received three of the new Boeing FB-1s in the first part of 1926, allowing them to operate one division of modern aircraft while retaining the older VE-7s for training purposes. With the civil war in China threatening American interests, it was decided to deploy U.S. forces and in November and December 1926, seven additional FB-1s were transferred to VF-3M from VF-1M and VF-2M on the east coast, bringing the squadron's complement to 10 FB-1s. As diplomacy and planning was taking place on the international level, the squadron concentrated on familiarizing itself with their new aircraft and training the influx of new pilots.

On 7 April 1927, VF-3M departed San Diego bound for China on the transport USS Henderson, but upon arrival, no airfield was available for operations. After waiting in the Philippines for almost two months, the squadron returned to China and eventually operated from airfields at Tientsin and Hsin-Ho, where they supported the 3rd Brigade. Shortly after setting up camp and starting flight operations, the squadron was redesignated VF-10M on 1 July 1927, the first of many changes in designation caused by the reorganization of naval aviation assets. The mission to China demonstrated that Marine Aviation was vital to the expeditionary role Marine forces were called on to perform and the squadron performed photography, mapping and reconnaissance missions while deployed. Another change in designation occurred while the squadron was still in China, when on 1 July 1928, the squadron was redesignated VF-6M. With its mission in China completed, the squadron withdrew on 3 October 1928, arriving back at San Diego on 31 October 1928, after stops at Guam and Hawaii.

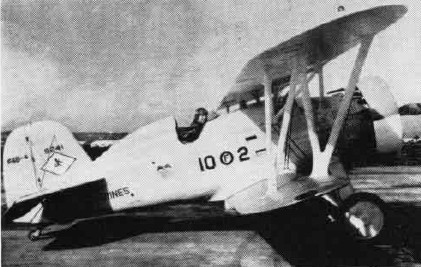
A VB-4M F4B-4 in 1933-35.

With its return to San Diego, most of the squadron's personnel were transferred to other units and the next year was spent re-organizing and training new personnel as they arrived. In addition to new pilots, several Boeing FB-5s were assigned to the squadron in 1929, the last of the in-line aircraft to be used by Marine squadrons. On 1 July 1930 the squadron was again re-designated, this time reverting to VF-10M, but the most noticeable change was the replacement of the FB-5s with Curtiss F6C-4s, the first radial engine fighters the squadron would be assigned. The squadron would operate the F6C-4s for over two years and be awarded the Herbert H. Schiff Cup for aviation safety before they were replaced by factory-fresh Boeing F4B-4s in late 1932, the most advanced biplane fighter in service at that time.

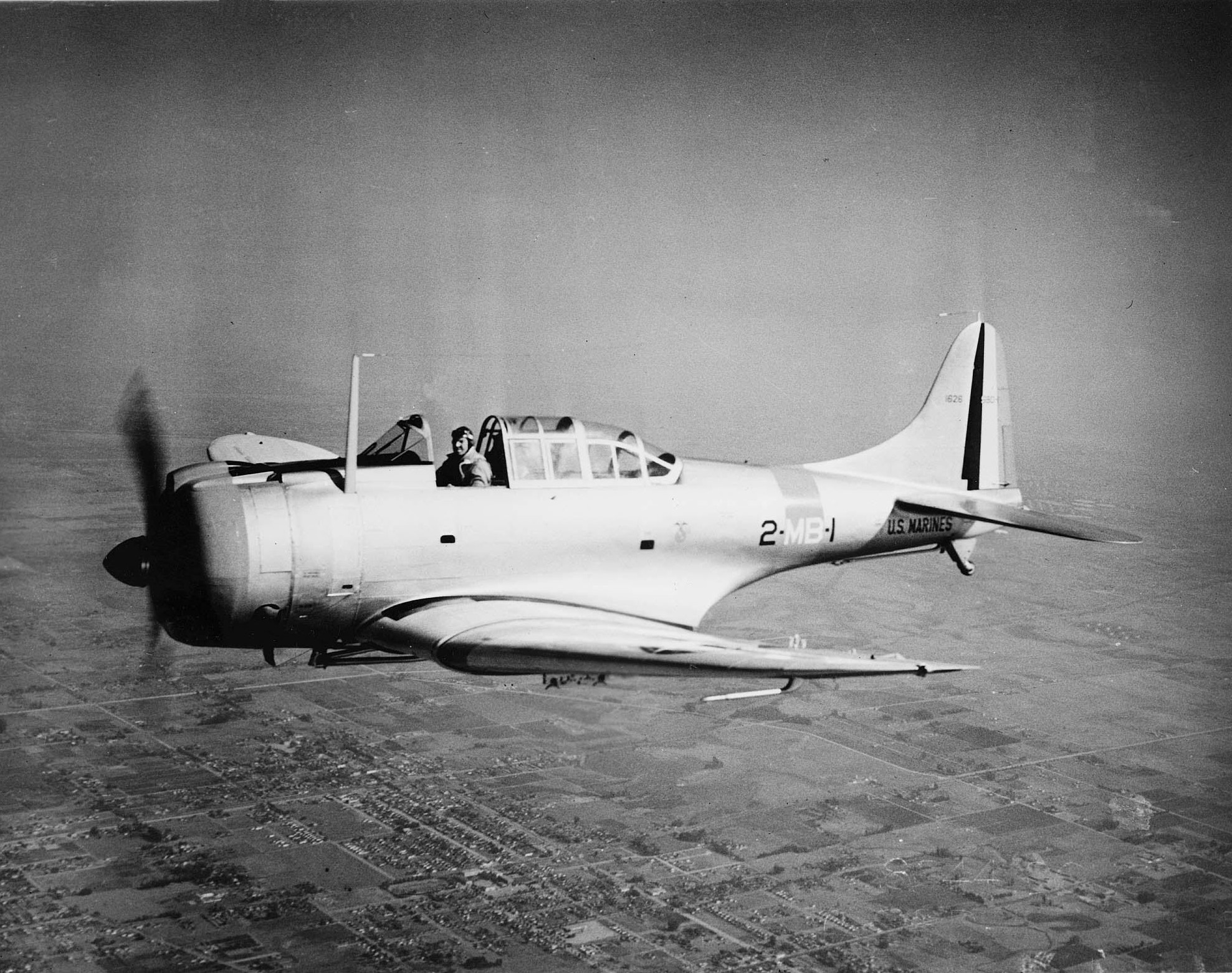
VMB-2 was equipped with the first Douglas SBD-1s in 1940

In 1932, it was determined that Marine Aviation should be provided with two light bombing squadrons, and on 1 July 1933, VF-10M became VB-4M, and was re-equipped with Boeing F4B-3s, a move considered a step back by members of the squadron. Participation in the Los Angeles National Air Races and annual Fleet Exercises were part of the routine that marked the squadron's activity in the early 1930s. In 1935, the squadron received 16 Great Lakes BG-1s, large two-place dive bombers that would equip the squadron for over five years.

On 1 July 1937, Marine aviation was completely reorganized to conform to Navy requirements, and VB-4M became VMB-2. Still flying the BG-1, the squadron continued to take part in the annual Fleet Exercises, and in December 1940, the squadron began receiving the new Douglas SBD-1, the first mono-plane in Marine Corps service. Arrival of the SBD also marked the first time that the Red Devil insignia was not carried on the squadron's aircraft, even though it was authorized to do so.

=== World War II ===
With the tension in the Pacific increasing, VMB-2 was deployed to Marine Corps Air Station Ewa, Oahu, Hawaii. Early 1941 also saw the transition from the colorful pre-war scheme to the tactical, and less colorful, light gray scheme, but still the Red Devil insignia was absent. On 1 July 1941, in anticipation of the large expansion marine aviation was about to undergo, VMB-2 became VMSB-232, the designation it carried during the Japanese attack on Pearl Harbor during which one member of the squadron was killed and nine of the squadron's aircraft were destroyed, with ten more requiring major overhaul. On Wake Island, a Red Devil detachment suffered twenty five enlisted Marines killed or captured while assisting in the defense of the doomed island.

On 20 August 1942, the squadron became part of the Cactus Air Force. and flew SBD Dauntlesses from Guadalcanal's 3,000-foot dirt runway Henderson Field. The Red Devils became the first Marine dive bomber squadron to fly against the Japanese. On the evening of 11-12 September, cruisers and destroyers of the Imperial Japanese Navy sailed into Ironbottom Sound and began shelling Henderson Field. Two pilots from VMSB-232 were killed and another two Marines were wounded. The squadron departed Guadalcanal on 12 October 1942, heading for Marine Corps Air Station El Toro, California, where it was redesignated again, this time as Marine Torpedo Bombing Squadron 232 (VMTB-232), flying newly acquired Grumman TBF Avengers. The squadron returned to the Pacific in July 1943 where it was first based in Espiritu Santo. From there it moved to Munda in order to support allied forces during the Bougainville landings in November 1943.

For the next few months, the squadron participated in strikes against the isolated Japanese garrison at Rabaul. On 14 February 1944, Avengers from VMTB-232 and VMTB-233 took part in a mission to sow mines in Simpson Harbour at Rabaul. The Grumman TBM Avengers were to fly up in three groups of eight each at the speed of 160 knots to drop their parachute-mines, weighing 1,600 pounds apiece. The first group lost one plane. The commanding officer tried to radio the other TBFs to warn them to turn back but he couldn't make radio contact. The second group lost two planes. The third group was immediately found by searchlight and anti-aircraft guns while flying at 800 feet over the water and had five aircraft shot down. Six planes and eighteen men were lost during the attack. Four of the eighteen men survived the loss of the six TBFs that evening. Of the four, none survived captivity. One was murdered at Tunnel Hill, two died of starvation, disease or medical neglect, and a fourth was murdered by the Japanese Navy some time in April.

The next few months would see them move continuously, operating from Piva, Green Island, Emirau and Ulithi. VMTB-232 landed at Kadena on 22 April 1945, and began flying close air support missions three days later and for the rest of the Battle of Okinawa. In July 1945 they began to fly strikes against the Japanese mainland until the surrender of Japan. During its participation in operations throughout World War II, VMTB-232 lost forty-nine Marines and seventeen aircraft. On 16 November 1945, the squadron, one of the few to earn two presidential citations during the war, arrived at San Diego, and was temporarily decommissioned.

=== 1950s ===
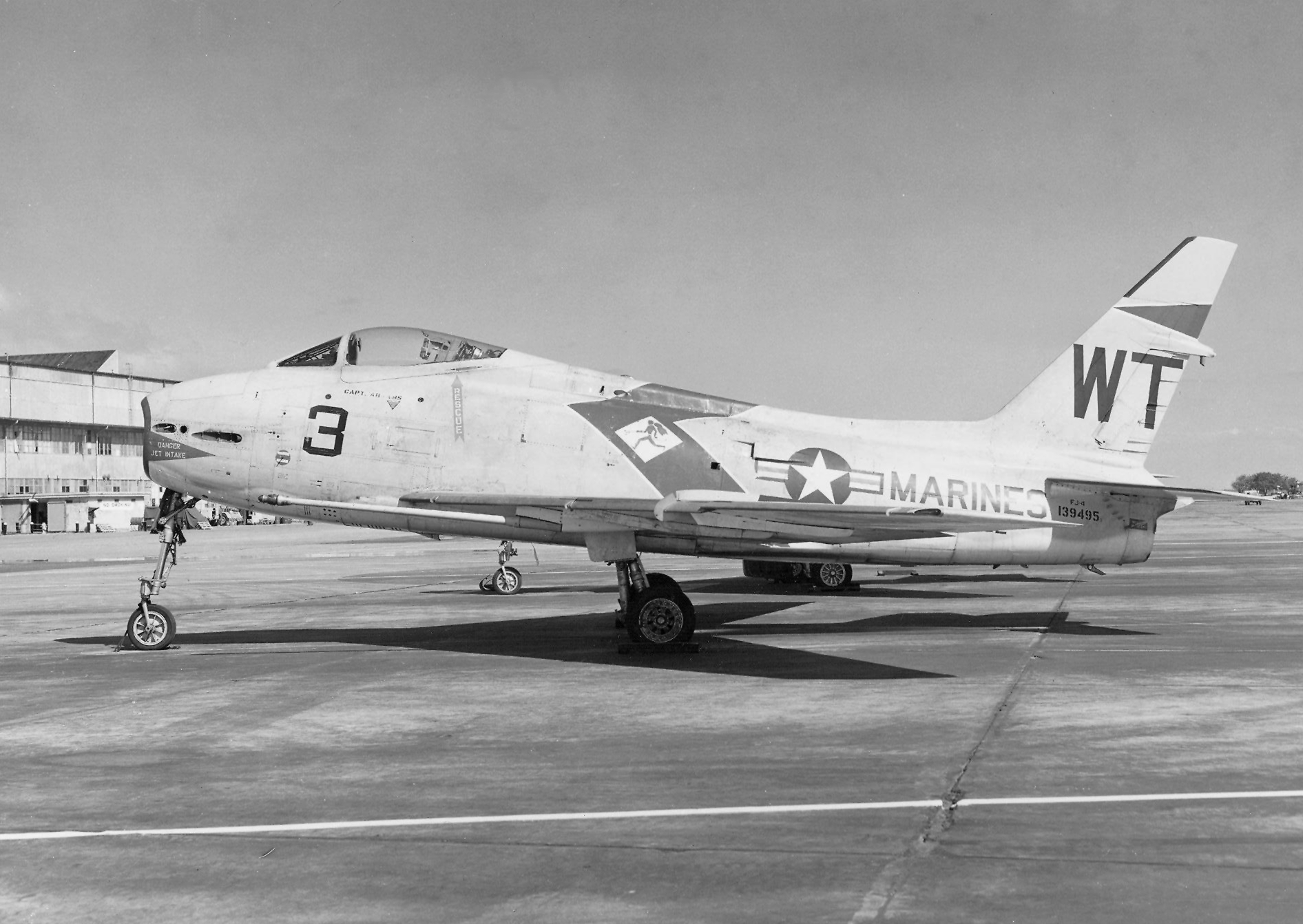
An FJ-4B of VMF-232 in 1958.

On 3 June 1948 the Red Devils were reactivated as a reserve fighter squadron at NAS New York / Floyd Bennett Field, New York, with the name it currently holds; Marine Fighter Attack Squadron 232. With the outbreak of hostilities in Korea, the squadron was placed on alert and ordered to Marine Corps Air Station El Toro, California. Here, the squadron received its first delivery of the F4U Corsair. Although the unit itself did not deploy to Korea, by April 1951 nearly all the original aviators and forty percent of the enlisted Marines in the squadron had been detached and sent overseas for combat duty.

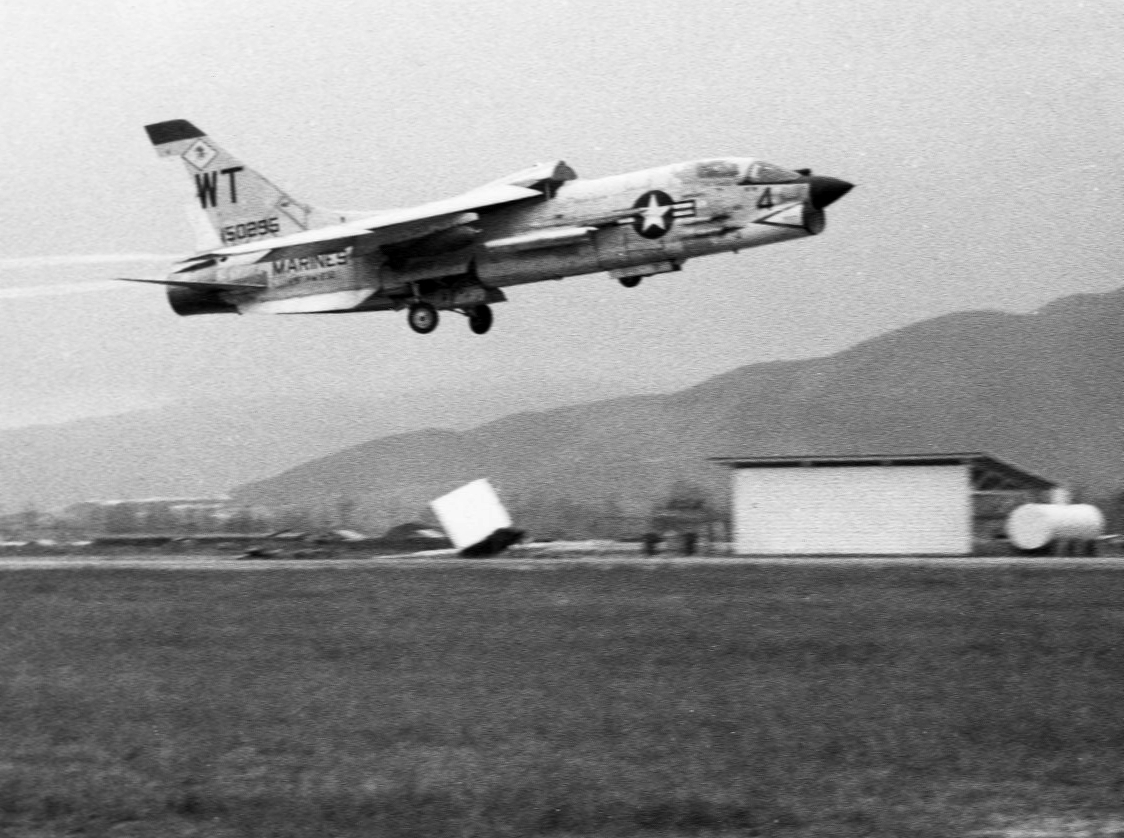
An F-8E from VMF(AW)-232 taking off from Da Nang, 1967.

In March 1953, the Red Devils transitioned to the jet age with the receipt of the Grumman F9F Panther. In 1954, homebase for 232 was changed from MCAS El Toro, to Marine Corps Air Station Kaneohe Bay, Hawaii, where they flew the FJ Fury, the "Navalized" version of the F-86 Sabre. In March 1956, the Red Devils, VMF 232 set a "till that time" record of 2558 flight hours and 1571 sorties in one month. The Red Devils moved to the final version of the Fury, the FJ-4 from '56-'59. VMF 232 was deployed to Westpac on the USS Bennington during the Quemoy Matsu Crisis in the fall of 1958 and later was stationed at Naval Air Facility Atsugi. That year the squadron flew over 10,000 hours and was named by the Commandant, the Marine Fighter Squadron of the Year. After arriving back in Japan, the squadron received its complement of new F-8 Crusaders beginning in March 1959.

=== Vietnam War ===
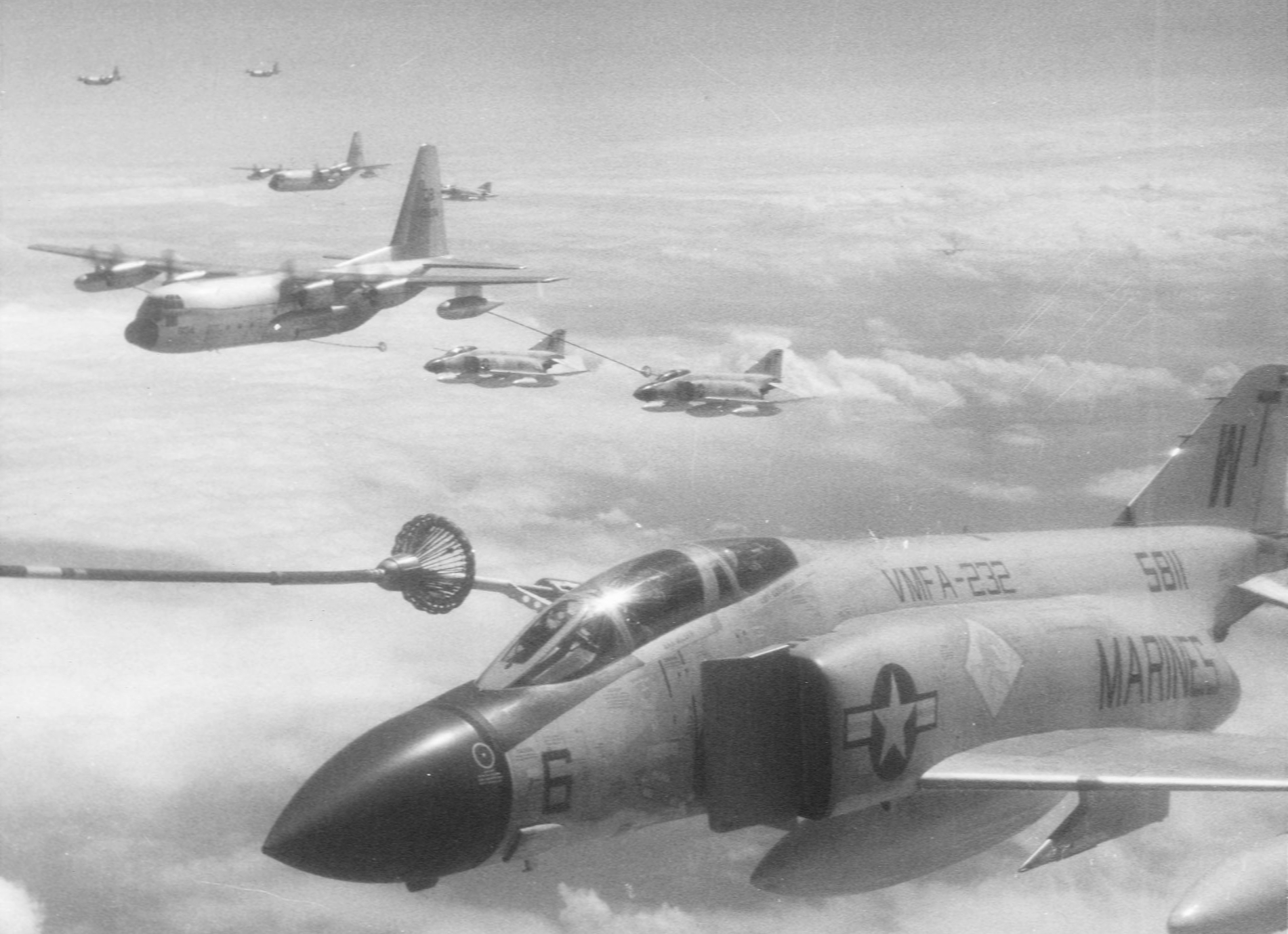
F-4J 155811: This aircraft was the only Marine jet lost to enemy aircraft in Vietnam, 26 August 1972.

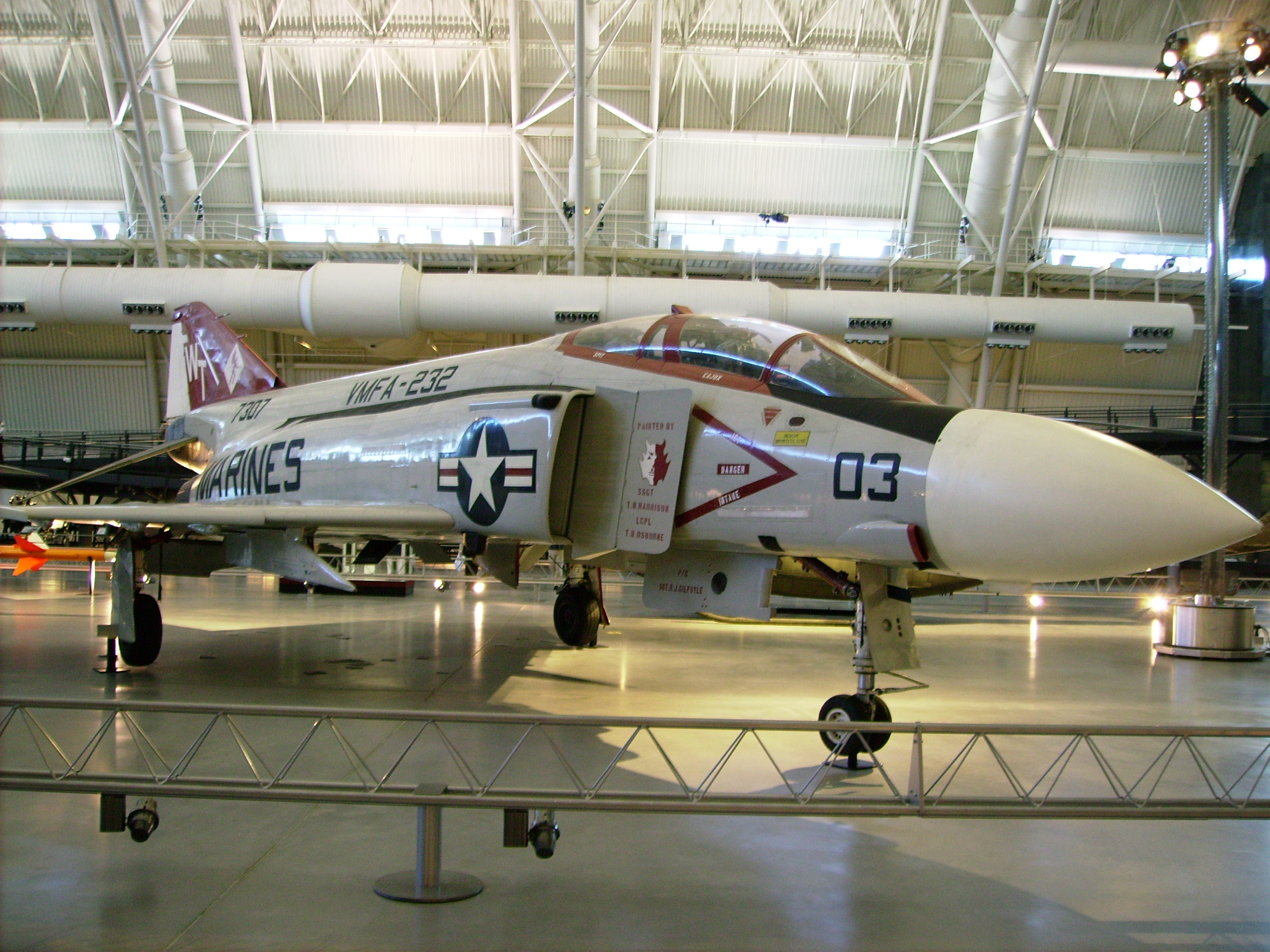
An F-4S from VMFA-232 on display at the Smithsonian Museum in Washington D.C.

As a result of intensified operations in Southeast Asia, VMF(AW)-232 departed MCAS Kaneohe Bay, and were flying combat sorties out of Da Nang Air Base, South Vietnam by December 1966. Staying online for the next 290 consecutive days, the squadron flew 5,785 sorties encompassing 7,273 flight hours and delivering 6,221 tons of ordnance. The squadron's aircraft were equipped with TPQ-10 bombing radar receivers thus making them ideal close air support platforms. They were also the only Marine aircraft capable of carrying 2,000-pound bombs until the arrival of Marine A-6 Intruders.

In September 1967, the squadron returned to MCAS El Toro and painted the Red Devil insignia on their new McDonnell Douglas F-4 Phantoms. Redesignated as Marine Fighter Attack Squadron 232, the squadron returned to MCAS Iwakuni, Japan. In March 1969, the squadron deployed to MAG 13 at Chu Lai Air Base, Vietnam, supporting ground operations in I Corps. They returned to Iwakuni in late 1969.

In April 1972, the entire squadron redeployed from Japan to Vietnam with minimum notice to counter the spring offensive of that year. After a three-month stay at Da Nang Air Base, VMFA-232 moved its operations to Royal Thai Air Base Nam Phong, Thailand. Here they continued to fly air to ground sorties in addition to playing a key fighter role on Operation Linebacker missions over North Vietnam. During their time operating out of Thailand, the squadron lost three F-4J Phantoms and two crewman. One of these aircraft was shot down by a MiG-21 over North Vietnam. The only "last" in VMFA-232's history occurred in September 1973 as the Red Devils became the last Marine squadron to leave the Vietnam War.

The squadron remained at MCAS Iwakuni, Japan as a force in readiness while participating in numerous training deployments and exercises. In 1974, the Red Devils received the coveted Robert M. Hanson "Marine Fighter Attack Squadron of the Year" award.

In October 1977, the Red Devils of VMFA-232 returned to MCAS Kaneohe Bay, Hawaii, after an eleven-year absence. This event, in turn, marked the beginning of Red Devils participation in the demanding Westpac Unit Deployment Program. In October 1986, the Red Devils completed their sixth, and last six-month tour of the Western Pacific in the venerable F-4 Phantom. In December 1988, VMFA-232 turned in their last F-4 Phantom II to the National Air and Space Museum.

=== 1980s and 1990s ===
VMFA-232 deployed from MCAS Kaneohe Bay to Marine Corps Air Station Iwakuni in September 1982 as part of the Unit Deployment Program. During this deployment the squadron also conducted operations from Kadena Air Base and Naval Air Station Cubi Point in the Philippines while also flying combat air patrols with aircraft from the USS Midway (CV-41) and USS Constellation (CV-64). The squadron returned to Hawaii in March 1982.

In early 1989, the Red Devils began their transition to the F/A-18 Hornet. Aircrew trained at VMFAT-101 at MCAS El Toro and the maintenance department at FRAMP at NAS Lemoore, California. In June 1989, with return of aircrew and maintenance personnel to Kaneohe Bay, Hawaii, and receipt of their twelfth Hornet, the Red Devils had completed the transition.

In December 1990, with intensification of Operation Desert Shield, the squadron deployed to Shaikh Isa, Bahrain. On 17 January 1991, the Red Devils were among the first to cross the Iraqi border during Operation Desert Storm. After 41 days of intense combat operations, Kuwait was liberated as the Red Devils completed 740 combat missions and 1,390 hours. For their outstanding performance in Southwest Asia, VMFA-232 received the Navy Unit Commendation. Returning to Hawaii in April 1991, the squadron spent four short months at home before they were again deployed to Westpac.

Upon completion of their Westpac deployment in July 1993, the squadron stopped briefly at MCAS Kaneohe Bay en route to their new home at MCAS El Toro, California, ending a sixteen-year absence. In October 1993, a significant milestone was reached when members of the Hornet Industry Team presented the squadron with a plaque honoring the Red Devils for achieving 50,000 accident free flight hours. This achievement spans almost 13 years of flying in the F-4 and F/A-18.

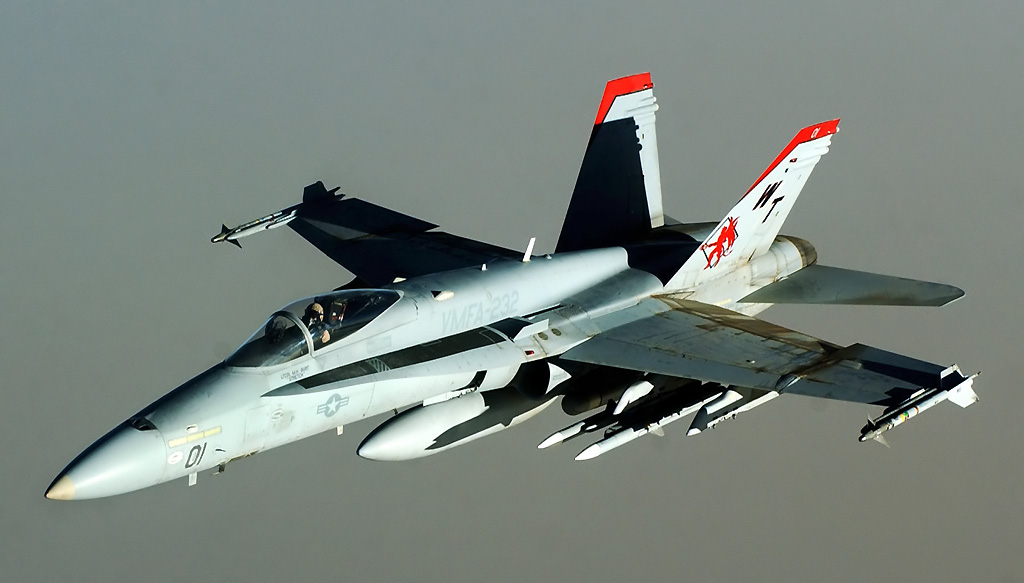
An F/A-18 Hornet from VMFA-232 flying during Operation Iraqi Freedom

The squadron returned to Iwakuni in February 1996 and began what was to be a most memorable WestPac. While deployed to WestPac, the squadron achieved two impressive milestones. The squadron was honored as it received both the 1995 Chief of Naval Operations Safety Award as they surpassed 66,000 hours and 17 years of mishap free flying, and the 1996 Marine Corps Aviation Association's, Marine Fighter Attack Squadron of the Year Award. VMFA-232 returned to Marine Corps Air Station Miramar in August 1996.

=== Global War on Terror ===
The squadron deployed to Kuwait in February 2003 and took part in the 2003 invasion of Iraq as part of Operation Iraqi Freedom. During the three and a half weeks of the war the squadron flew 1,150 hours during 540 sorties dropping 620,000 pounds of ordnance. The squadron returned to MCAS Miramar in May 2003. In 2005, VMFA-232 became part of the United States Navy's Carrier Air Wing 11. In May 2005 they deployed with the rest of CVW-11 aboard the USS Nimitz to the Western Pacific and Persian Gulf, participating in combat operations in support of Operation Iraqi Freedom, Operation Enduring Freedom, and multinational exercises with Japan, Egypt, and India until November 2005. Early in the Nimitz deployment, several of the squadron members were interviewed for the PBS documentary Carrier. In 2007 the squadron deployed on the Nimitz again for a six-month cruise to the Persian Gulf. Four months later they did another WestPac deployment on the Nimitz. In January 2010 VMFA-232 accepted two F/A-18D Hornet aircraft and left in May 2010 for a deployment to Kandahar, Afghanistan in support of Operation Enduring Freedom. While in Afghanistan the Red Devils flew 4,090 Flight hours encompassing 1190 sorties and dropped 240,000 lbs of ordnance and expended 30,000 rounds of 20mm ammunition. They returned to MCAS Miramar in November 2010.

On 27 March 2015, the Red Devils would embark on their final combat deployment of the GWOT era. Based at Shaikh Isa, Bahrain, VMFA-232, and flying under the callsign “Stoic”, the Red Devils dropped over 261,000 lbs of ordnance and shot over 20,000 rounds of 20mm in support of Marines and coalition forces in Iraq and Syria. With nearly every employment inside of 500 meters VMFA-232 quickly gained the special trust and confidence of battalion commanders, air officers, joint terminal attack controllers, and the individual Marine or coalition partner on the ground. The callsign “Stoic” became a known and much preferred brand of support. As the deployment progressed ground forces ceased requesting first available fixed wing support, but simply requested “Stoic”. Squadron pilots and personnel departed Bahrain on 16 October 2015, with support personnel arriving back home at MCAS Miramar on 18 October 2015.

In accordance with the 2025 Aviation plan, the squadron will begin transitioning to the F-35C Lightning II in fiscal year 2029 and will complete the transition no later than FY 2030.

=== 2015 Crash ===
On 21 October 2015, an F/A-18C of VMFA-232 crashed in East Anglia, United Kingdom near the airbases at RAF Lakenheath and RAF Mildenhall. The aircraft was reportedly one of six transitting through RAF Lakenheath following a deployment in the Middle East. It was reported the pilot, identified as Major Taj Sareen, did not survive the event.

== Notable former members ==
- Randolph Bresnik
- Oliver Mitchell
- William "Spider" Nyland
- Kevin Iiams

== See also ==
- United States Marine Corps Aviation
- Organization of the United States Marine Corps
- List of active United States Marine Corps aircraft squadrons
- List of inactive United States Marine Corps aircraft squadrons
