= Curtiss F7C Seahawk =

1927 fighter aircraft series by Curtiss

F7C-1 Seahawk
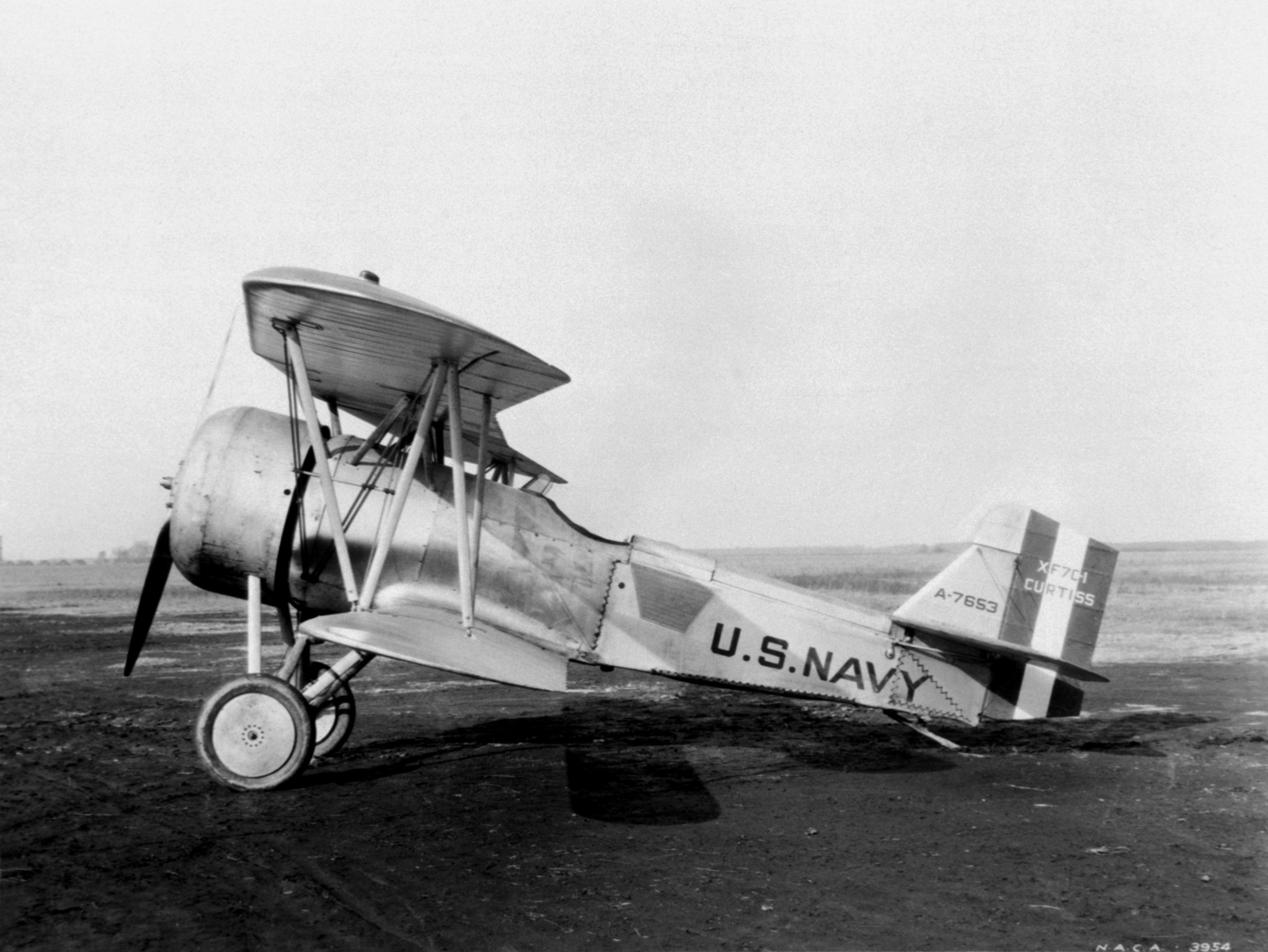
- The Curtiss XF7C-1 in June 1929

General information
- Type: Fighter
- Manufacturer: Curtiss Aeroplane and Motor Company
- Primary user: United States Marine Corps
- Number built: 17

History
- First flight: 28 February 1927
- Retired: 1933

The Curtiss F7C Seahawk is a carrier-capable biplane fighter aircraft of the United States Navy Marine Corps in the late 1920s and early 1930s.

== Design and development ==
Curtiss' Model 43 was their first aircraft designed expressly for the Navy, rather than a modified Army type. While clearly a descendant of the P-1 Hawk, its wings were constant-chord rather than tapered, and the upper wing had a slight sweepback. The engine was a 450 hp (340 kW) Pratt & Whitney R-1340-B Wasp radial. Entirely fabric-covered, the top wing was framed with spruce, while the fuselage was built from a combination of aluminum and steel tubing, sufficiently strong to serve as a dive bomber as well as a fighter.

== Operational history ==
The prototype XF7C-1 first flew on 28 February 1927. After some modification demanded by the Navy (such as the wing sweepback), 17 production aircraft F7C-1 Seahawks were built, and entered service in the USMC's VF-5M at Quantico. In 1930 VF-9M organized the Marines' first aerobatic stunt team, "The Red Devils", with F7Cs featuring red painted noses. They continued in service until 1933.

== Variants ==
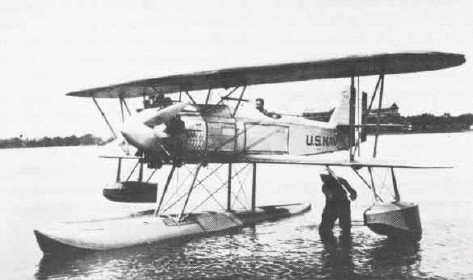
The XF7C-1 as a seaplane without the cowling.

- XF7C-1: Prototype aircraft; one built.
- F7C-1 Seahawk: Single-seat fighter aircraft, main production version; 17 built.
- XF7C-2: Single F7C-1 conversion for evaluation with the 575 hp (429 kW) Wright R-1820-1 radial engine and large-span full-span flaps.
- XF7C-3: A demonstration prototype for China with an armament of four .30 in (7.62 mm) M1919 Browning machine guns, I-type interplane struts, and ailerons on both the upper and lower wings rather than on just the upper wing. The type was superseded by the Model 64, F11C Goshawk.

== Operators ==
United States

- United States Marine Corps

== Specifications (F7C-1) ==
Data from Curtiss Aircraft 1907–1947

General characteristics

- Crew: 1
- Length: 22 ft 7.25 in (6.8898 m)
- Wingspan: 30 ft 8 in (9.35 m)
- Height: 9 ft 8.5 in (2.959 m)
- Wing area: 275 sq ft (25.5 m^{2})
- Airfoil: Curtiss C-72
- Empty weight: 2,053 lb (931 kg)
- Gross weight: 2,768 lb (1,256 kg)
- Powerplant: × Pratt & Whitney R-1340B Wasp 9-cylinder air-cooled radial piston engine, 450 hp (340 kW)
- Propellers: 2-bladed fixed-pitch propeller

Performance

- Maximum speed: 155.5 mph (250.3 km/h, 135.1 kn)
- Cruise speed: 150 mph (240 km/h, 130 kn)
- Range: 355 mi (571 km, 308 nmi)
- Service ceiling: 22,100 ft (6,700 m)
- Rate of climb: 1,860 ft/min (9.4 m/s)

Armament

- Guns: 2 × fixed .30 in (7.62 mm) Browning machine guns in the forward fuselage
