= Landing on Emirau =

1944 US operation in Papua New Guinea during WWII

- Part of World War II, Pacific War
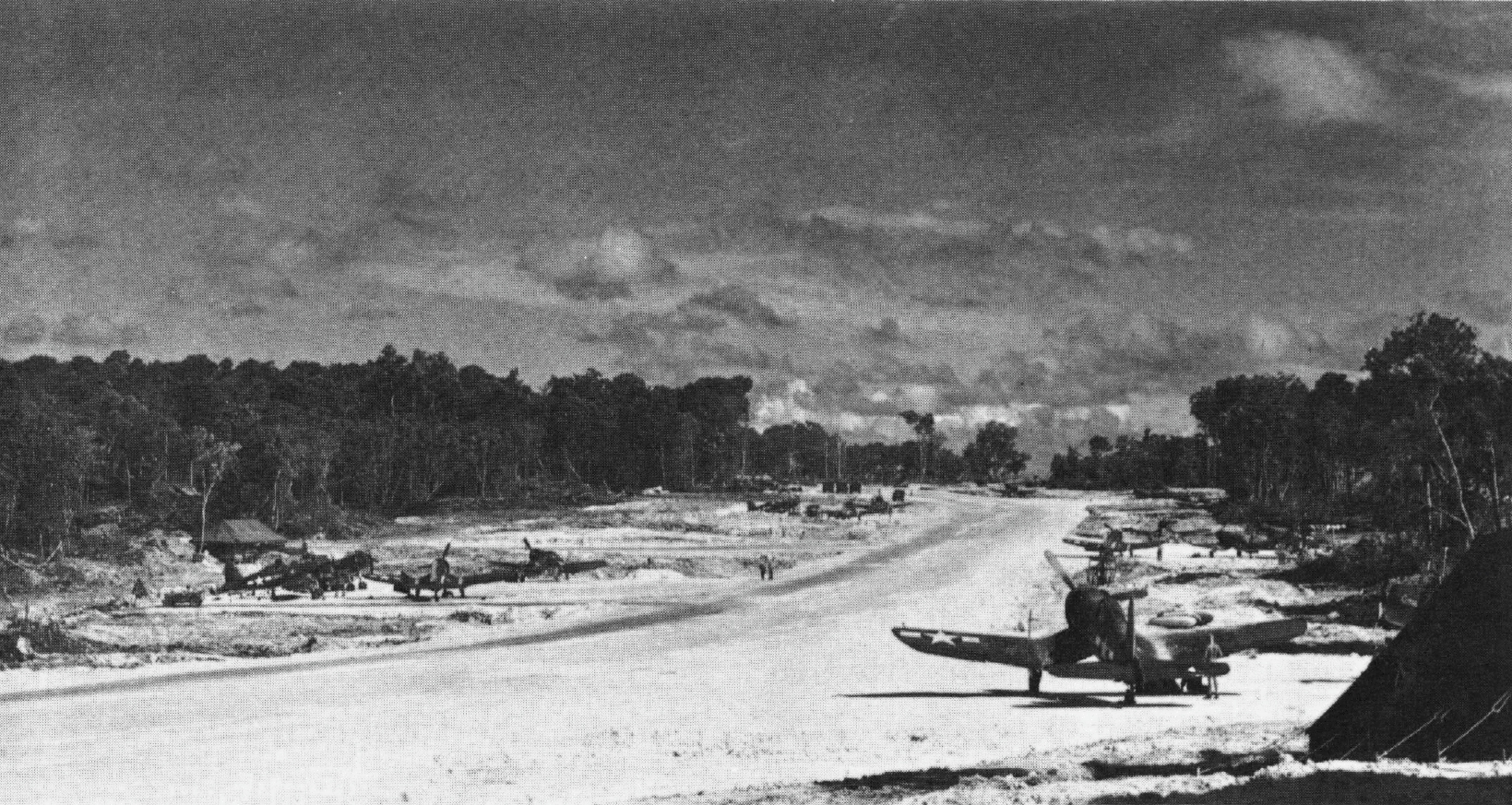
- F4U Corsairs on Emirau Island in position along a taxiway to the new airport which was operational less than two months after the landing
Date	20–27 March 1944
Location	Emirau Island, Territory of New Guinea 1°41′06″S 150°00′00″E
Result	Unopposed

Belligerents
United States	Japan

Commanders and leaders
(United States) William Halsey, Jr. (United States) Lawrence Reifsnider (United States) Alfred H. Noble (United States) William L. McKittrick	(Empire of Japan) Jinichi Kusaka (Empire of Japan) Ryukichi Tamura

Strength
4,000	

Casualties and losses
1 injured	

The Landing on Emirau was the last of the series of operations that made up Operation Cartwheel, General Douglas MacArthur's strategy for the encirclement of the major Japanese base at Rabaul. A force of nearly 4,000 United States Marines landed on the island of Emirau on 20 March 1944. The island was not occupied by the Japanese and there was no fighting. It was developed into an airbase which formed the final link in the chain of bases surrounding Rabaul. The isolation of Rabaul permitted MacArthur to turn his attention westward and commence his drive along the north coast of New Guinea toward the Philippines.

== Background ==
=== Strategy ===
In February 1943, General MacArthur had presented the US Joint Chiefs of Staff with his Elkton Plan for an advance on the Japanese stronghold of Rabaul. In this "scheme of manoeuvre" the penultimate stage was the capture of Kavieng, an important staging post for aircraft moving from Truk to Rabaul. The Allied occupation of Kavieng would cut this route and isolate Rabaul. The Allied victory in the Admiralty Islands campaign in March 1944 prompted the Joint Chiefs of Staff to consider accelerating the tempo of operations in the Pacific. They solicited opinions on the matter from the theatre commanders. On 5 March 1944, armed with detailed information about Japanese deployments and intentions as a result of the capture of Japanese cryptographic materials in the Battle of Sio, MacArthur recommended omitting the proposed attack on Hansa Bay in favor of moving further up the coast of New Guinea to Hollandia. As this would be out of range of his land-based aircraft, he proposed that aircraft carriers of Admiral Chester W. Nimitz' United States Pacific Fleet, which were to cover the Manus and Kavieng operations could provide air cover until land-based aircraft could be established ashore. Admiral Nimitz, in Washington DC for consultation, objected to this proposal to retain forces in the South West Pacific theatre after the capture of Kavieng, as it would disrupt his plans for upcoming operations in the Pacific Ocean theatre. The Joint War Plans Committee discussed these alternatives, and recommended to the Joint Chiefs that Hollandia be seized on 15 April, but that the Kavieng operation be canceled.

MacArthur's Chief of Staff, Lieutenant General Richard K. Sutherland, representing his commander before the Joint Chiefs, strenuously objected to the omission of Kavieng, which he believed could be captured on 1 April without delaying other operations. There was debate over how much of a threat the Japanese base at Kavieng was. Nimitz felt that as a result of the Battle of Eniwetok, Truk itself would soon be under constant attack and the flow of aircraft to Rabaul would be cut off. On 12 March, orders went out to MacArthur and Nimitz canceling Operation FOREARM [Kavieng] and ordering them to "complete the isolation of the Rabaul-Kavieng area with the minimum commitment of forces". In the opinion of the commander of the South Pacific Area, Admiral William Halsey, Jr., "the geography of the area begged for another bypass". On receipt of orders from MacArthur revoking plans for Kavieng and ordering him to occupy Emirau, Halsey ordered the commander of the III Amphibious Force, Rear Admiral Theodore S. Wilkinson, to occupy Emirau on 20 March.

=== Geography ===
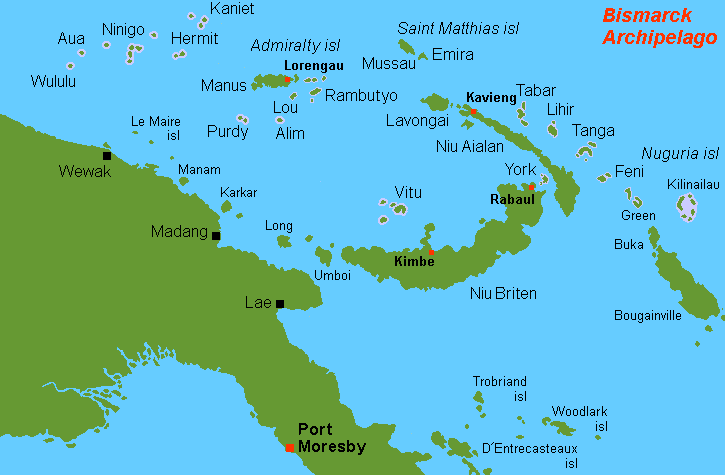
Bismarck Archipelago

Emirau (or Emira) is an island in the Bismarck Archipelago in the south eastern portion of the St. Matthias Islands, located 25 miles (40 km) from Mussau Island, the other principal island in the St. Matthias group, and 90 miles (140 km) from Kavieng. Emirau is about 8 miles (13 km) long and 2 miles (3.2 km) wide, hilly, and heavily wooded. Inland is a 90-acre (36 ha) plateau. The climate is tropical, with high humidity and heavy rainfall. There is a small harbor, Hamburg Bay, on the north west coast. About 300 natives lived on the island; but all available intelligence indicated that the Japanese had not occupied the islands in any appreciable strength. Emirau was considered suitable for development as an airbase and base for PT boats. A photo reconnaissance mission on 16 March revealed no indication whatsoever of enemy activity or installations.

== Preparations ==
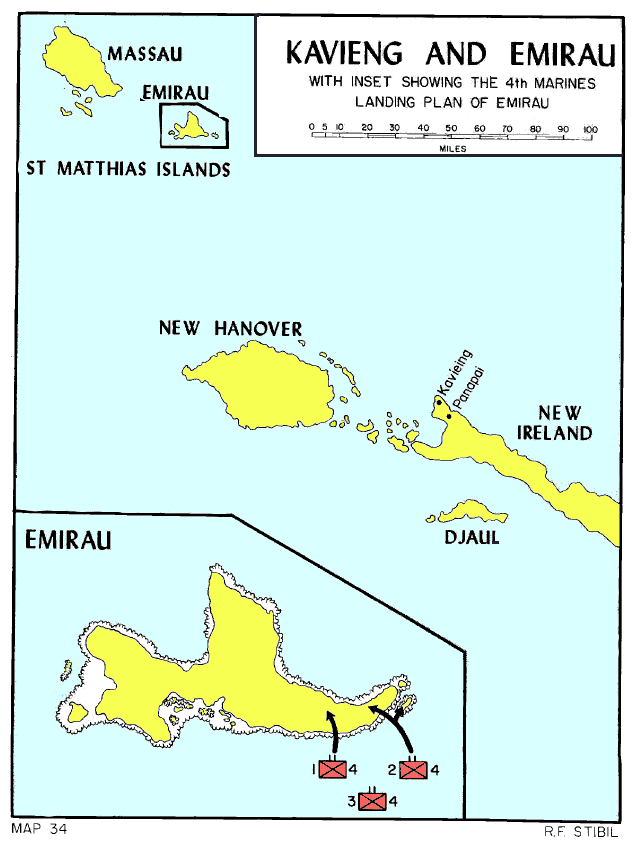
Landing on Emirau

Halsey's message reached Wilkinson on Guadalcanal on 15 March, by which time ships were already loading for the Kavieng operation, which had originally been scheduled for 18 March. This operation was to have been carried out by Major General Roy S. Geiger's I Amphibious Corps, with the 40th Infantry Division and 3rd Marine Division, reinforced by the 4th Marines. For Emirau, Lieutenant Colonel Alan Shapley's 4th Marines would be sufficient, reinforced by Company C, 3rd Amphibian Tractor Battalion; Company A (Medium), 3rd Tank Battalion, equipped with M4 Sherman tanks; a company of pioneers from the 2nd Battalion, 19th Marines; signals, ordnance and motor transport detachments; and a composite anti-aircraft battery of the 14th Defense Battalion. This would be the first operation for the 4th Marines, which had been reformed on 1 February 1944 from four battalions of Marine Raiders, the original 4th Marines having been destroyed in the Battle of Corregidor. Commodore Lawrence F. Reifsnider was appointed to command the amphibious operation. Brigadier General Alfred H. Noble, the Assistant Division Commander of the 3d Marine Division would command the expeditionary troops. Noble, who was also slated to become island commander, was given a small staff created from I Amphibious Corps and 3rd Marine Division personnel. An air command was organized for Emirau under Colonel William L. McKittrick from the larger one intended for the Kavieng operation.

No opposition was expected on Emirau, but strong naval and air support was provided. A covering force under Rear Admiral Robert M. Griffin, consisting of the battleships New Mexico, Mississippi, Idaho and Tennessee, accompanied by the escort carriers Manila Bay and Natoma Bay, and 15 destroyers, carried out part of the original Kavieng plan—the bombardment of Kavieng and the surrounding area. In all, some 1,079 rounds of 14-inch and 12,281 rounds of 5-inch ammunition were fired. The bombardment gave Rear Admiral Ryukichi Tamura the impression that the expected invasion by Allied forces was imminent and he gave the order to kill all the European prisoners in Kavieng. At least 25 of them were executed in the Kavieng Wharf Massacre, which later led to six of the perpetrators being sentenced for war crimes in 1947. Sentenced to death by hanging, Tamura was executed at Stanley Prison on 16 March 1948.

== Operations ==
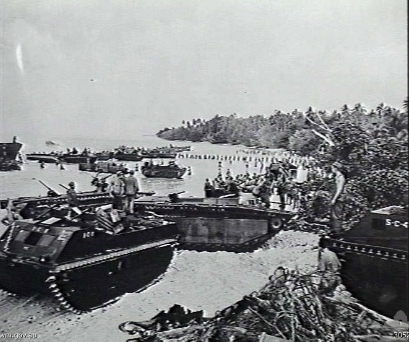
Supplies and equipment being brought ashore from landing craft to support the US Marine landing force. LVTs ferrying supplies ashore in the distance while a chain of men stretches from a landing craft to the shore to manhandle supplies to the beach.

The assault force left in two echelons. The Marines of the two assault battalions, the 1st and 2nd Battalions, 4th Marines, traveled on nine high speed transports (APDs) while the remainder of the force were on the dock landing ships (LSDs) Epping Forest, Gunston Hall and Lindenwald, and the attack transport (APA) Callaway. One LSD carried the 66 LVTs for crossing Emirau's fringing reef, one carried three LCTs, two of them loaded with tanks, and the third carried three LCTs with radar sets and anti-aircraft guns.

The attack group arrived in the transport area at 06:05 on 20 March. The LVTs were launched, and the assault troops transferred to the amphibious tractors using the APDs' boats, supplemented by those from Callaway while Vought F4U Corsairs of VMF-218 flew overhead to make a last-minute check of the island for any signs of the Japanese. The assault waves touched down on schedule. The reserve 3rd Battalion's boats grounded on the reef soon afterwards, and its marines waded ashore through knee deep water. The only problem encountered was with launching the LCTs carrying the tanks. The LSD's flooding mechanism failed and the LCTs had to be dragged out by a fleet tug. While the detachment sent to occupy Elomusao Island was approaching the beach, some supposed opposition caused the amphibious tractors and then a destroyer to open fire, and a man was wounded by a shell fragment. However, the natives informed the marines that the Japanese had left Emirau two months before and only a small detachment remained on Mussau Island. Supplies began landing at around 11:00, first from the APDs and then from Callaway. Some 3,727 troops and 844 tons of cargo were ashore by nightfall when the ships sailed. Within a month, some 18,000 men and 44,000 tons of supplies had been landed.

Intelligence reports indicated that there were Japanese fuel and ration dumps on Mussau, and a radio station on a nearby island, so on 23 March these areas were shelled by destroyers. On 27 March, a destroyer intercepted a large canoe carrying Japanese troops about 40 miles (64 km) south of Mussau. The Japanese soldiers replied with their rifles and machine guns, and the destroyer returned fire, destroying the canoe and killing the occupants. Thus ended the only fighting in the St. Matthias Group.

== Base development ==
Construction activities were taken in hand by the US Navy Seabees of the 18th Construction Regiment, which consisted of the 27th, 61st and 63rd Construction Battalions and the 17th Special Battalion, which arrived between 25 and 30 March, and the 77th Construction Battalion which arrived on 14 April. The 27th built a PT boat base, an LCT floating drydock and slipway, and roads. The 61st constructed housing, ammunition storage facilities, a runway, and some of the buildings at the PT boat base. It also handled sawmill operations. The 63rd assisted at the sawmill and worked on the roads, camps, harbor facilities, warehouses, magazines and avgas dumps. The 77th built taxiways, hardstands, aviation workshops and the avgas tank farm. The 88th worked on runways, roads, radar stations and a causeway at the eastern end of the island.

Two airfields were constructed, Inshore and North Cape. These were heavy bomber strips, 7,000 feet (2,100 m) long and 300 feet (91 m) wide. The former had parking for 210 fighters or light bombers; the latter for 84 heavy bombers. Both were fully equipped with towers, lighting, and a dispensary. The aviation tank farm consisted of three 10,000-barrel (~1,400 t) storage tanks and nineteen 1,000-barrel (~140 t) storage tanks, together with the appropriate filling and distribution points. A reserve of 40,000 barrels (~5,500 t) was stored in drums. Three hospitals were established, a 100-bed naval base hospital, the 160-bed 24th Army Field Hospital, and the 150-bed Acorn 7 Hospital. The anchorage at Hamburg Bay could accommodate up to five capital ships. Port facilities included eight cranes, 42,000 cubic feet (1,200 m^{3}) of refrigerated space, and 400,000 square feet (37,000 m^{2}) of covered storage. The port could handle 800 measurement tons (910 m^{3}) of cargo per day. Connecting the various facilities was 40 miles (64 km) of coral-surfaced all-weather road. All this work was completed by August and Construction Battalion Maintenance Unit (CBMU) 502 assumed responsibility for maintenance work. All the construction battalions departed by December.

== Garrison ==
The 4th Marines were relieved as the garrison of Emirau by the 147th Infantry on 11 April 1944. The next day, Noble was replaced as island commander by a marine aviator, Major General James T. Moore, the Commanding General of the 1st Marine Aircraft Wing. In turn, the 147th Infantry was relieved as garrison by the 369th Infantry in June. In August, General MacArthur directed that responsibility for garrisoning Emirau would be transferred to the Australian Army. The Australian 8th Infantry Battalion arrived to take over the garrison role on Emirau on 30 September. They were met by a small ANGAU detachment that had been on the island since May. Marine Aircraft Group 12 operated from Emirau until December, when it moved to Leyte; its place was taken by squadrons of the RNZAF. On 20 March 1945, General MacArthur authorized a reduction in the garrison size to one company of the 8th Infantry Battalion. In June 1945, it too was withdrawn. CBMU 502 departed for Manus that month. The RNZAF maintained a bomber-reconnaissance squadron at Emirau until July 1945, and a fighter squadron until August, when all forces were withdrawn from the island.
