= Thomas J. Cushman =

American Marine Corps general (1895–1972)

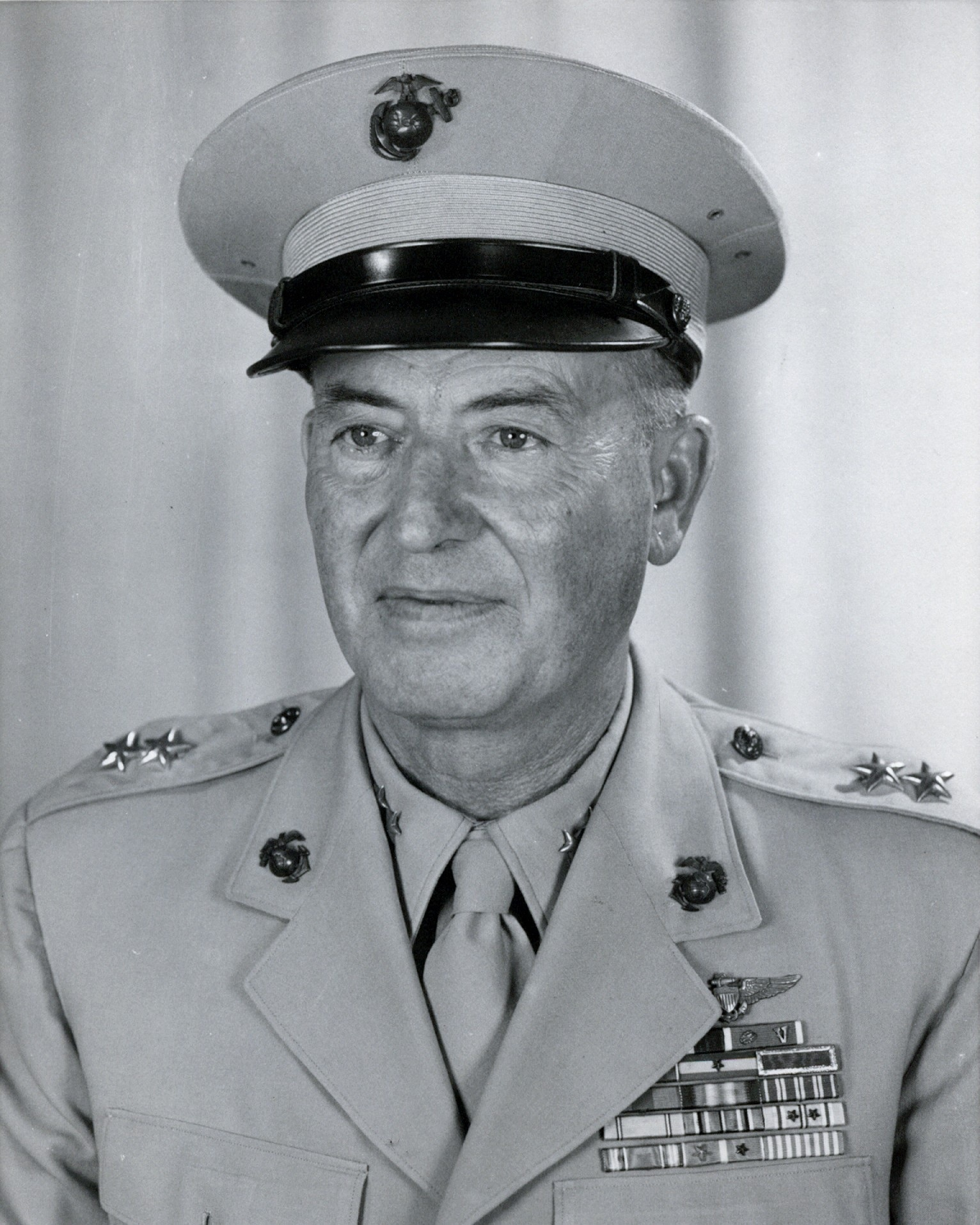
- Born: June 27, 1895; St. Louis, Missouri, U.S.
- Died: July 15, 1972 (aged 77); Corona del Mar, California, U.S.
- Burial place: Fort Rosecrans National Cemetery
- Military career
- Allegiance: United States of America
- Branch: United States Marine Corps
- Service years: 1917–1954
- Rank: Lieutenant General
- Commands: 2nd Marine Aircraft Wing; Aircraft, Fleet Marine Force, Atlantic; 1st Marine Aircraft Wing (Acting); Aircraft, Fleet Marine Force, Pacific; Marine Corps Air Bases; Air Defense, Marianas Islands; 4th Marine Base Defense Air Wing; Marine Corps Air Station Cherry Point; Base Air Detachment, Quantico; VF-2M; VO-8M
- Conflicts: World War I Banana Wars: Occupation of Nicaragua; Occupation of Haiti; World War II; Korean War
- Awards: Navy Distinguished Service Medal; Legion of Merit (2); Bronze Star Medal

Thomas Jackson Cushman (June 27, 1895 – July 15, 1972) was a United States Marine Corps aviator. He served from 1917 to 1954, advancing from private to major general during his military career. Cushman commanded aviation forces in combat during both World War II and the Korean War and was advanced to lieutenant general upon retirement.

== Biography ==
Cushman was born on June 27, 1895 in St. Louis, Missouri, but his family soon moved to Washington state. He attended the University of Washington from 1913 to 1917, but left to enlist in the Marine Corps during World War I. Cushman was initially assigned to the Mare Island Navy Yard. Selected for aviation training, he was sent to study aeronautics at the Naval Aviation Ground School, Massachusetts Institute of Technology. After completing his training, Cushman was commissioned as a second lieutenant on October 22, 1918. Sent to the Marine Flying School, Miami, Florida, he was designated a naval aviator in July 1919.

In June 1921, Cushman was assigned to Marine Barracks, Puget Sound, Washington. In September 1923, he was reassigned to Naval Station, Guam, Marianas Islands. From November 1924 to August 1925, Cushman served at Brown Field, Marine Barracks, Quantico, Virginia. He then became an instructor at Naval Air Station, Pensacola, Florida.

From November 1926 to April 1929, Cushman was attached to Aircraft Squadrons, West Coast Expeditionary Force, San Diego, California. From March to June 1927, he was sent to Managua, Nicaragua. In May 1929, Cushman was reassigned to VO-9M in Port-au-Prince, Haiti. In December 1930, he became squadron executive officer.

In September 1931, Cushman was sent to the Army Air Corps Technical Schools, Chanute Field, Rantoul, Illinois to take the engineering course. He graduated in July 1932 and then attended the company officers course at the Marine Corps Schools, Quantico. After graduating in June 1933, Cushman was assigned to the Bureau of Aeronautics, Department of the Navy, Washington, D.C. In August 1935, he was sent to attend the Army Air Corps Tactical School, Maxwell Field, Montgomery, Alabama.

In July 1936, Cushman joined Aircraft Two, Fleet Marine Force, San Diego and became commanding officer of VO-8M. In July 1937, he became Aircraft Two operations officer. In July 1938, Cushman was given command of VF-2M. In June 1939, he became commanding officer of the Base Air Detachment, Quantico. Cushman was promoted to lieutenant colonel effective July 1, 1941.

In August 1941, Cushman was sent to Craven County, North Carolina to act as the Marine Corps representative supervising the construction of the new Marine Corps Air Station Cherry Point by the Navy Civil Engineer Corps.

=== World War II ===
When Air Station Cherry Point was initially commissioned as Cunningham Field on May 20, 1942, Cushman became its first commanding officer. He was promoted to colonel effective October 1, 1942. In August 1943, he was relieved of command and sent to the Pacific theatre.

From September 1943 to May 1944, Cushman served as chief of staff, Commanding General, Marine Aircraft Wings, Pacific. He was nominated for temporary promotion to brigadier general on December 18, 1943. His temporary promotion to brigadier general was approved on January 11, 1944 and eventually made permanent on February 18, 1948.

In May 1944, Cushman succeeded Brig. Gen. Lewie G. Merritt as commander of the 4th Marine Base Defense Air Wing. When Maj. Gen. Louis E. Woods assumed command of the air wing in August 1944, he served as deputy commander until October. From November 1944 to April 1945, Cushman was commander of Air Defense, Marianas Islands. He was awarded the Legion of Merit and Bronze Star Medal for his service in the Pacific theatre.

In May 1945, Cushman resumed command of Air Station Cherry Point while also serving as Deputy Commander, Marine Corps Air Bases. From September 1946 to March 1947, he was Commander, Marine Corps Air Bases. In May 1947, Cushman became Deputy Commander and Chief of Staff, Aircraft, Fleet Marine Force, Pacific. On February 5, 1948, he became Commanding General, Aircraft, Fleet Marine Force, Pacific.

=== Korean War ===
In June 1950, Cushman became deputy commander of the 1st Marine Aircraft Wing. From July to December 1950, he commanded the forward elements of the Aircraft Wing in Korea. In September 1950, his squadrons provided air support for the amphibious landings at Inchon and the liberation of Seoul. From May to July 1951, Cushman served as acting commander of the Aircraft Wing. He received the Navy Distinguished Service Medal and a second award of the Legion of Merit for his service in Korea.

In August 1951, Cushman returned to United States. His temporary promotion to major general was approved on August 10, 1951 and later made permanent on May 5, 1952. He served as commander of Aircraft, Fleet Marine Force, Atlantic and as commanding general of the 2nd Marine Aircraft Wing at Cherry Point. In February 1953, Cushman became deputy commander of Fleet Marine Force, Pacific. He retired from active duty in February 1954 and was advanced to lieutenant general on the retired list.

== Family and later life ==
On January 13, 1919, Cushman married Helen Moores. They had a son, Thomas Jackson Jr. After his first wife's death, Cushman married Eleanor Barker on October 14, 1921. They had a son, Robert Edward, and a daughter, Eleanor Jane.

Thomas Jackson Cushman Jr. also became a Marine Corps aviator, earning the Distinguished Flying Cross in both World War II and the Korean War. Robert Edward Cushman died in 1938 at the age of sixteen after accidentally shooting himself with a handgun. Eleanor Jane Cushman married a Marine Corps officer, Lyle Kaye London.

Lieutenant General Cushman died on July 15, 1972 in Corona del Mar, California. He was interred at Fort Rosecrans National Cemetery along with his second wife and second son.
