= Marine Corps Air Station Ewa =

Former air station in Hawaii

- Oahu, Hawaii
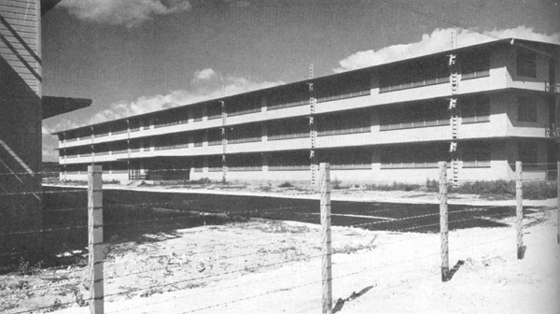
- Civilian barracks at Ewa

Site information
- Type: Military air station
- Controlled by: USMC

Location
- Coordinates: 21°19′20″N 158°02′58″W

Site history
- Built: 1925 – 18 June 1952
- In use: 1925 - 1952
- Battles/wars: World War II * Attack on Pearl Harbor

Marine Corps Air Station Ewa (MCAS Ewa) was a United States Marine Corps air station that was located 7 miles (11 km) west of Pearl Harbor on the island of Oahu, Hawaii. The base was hit during the attack on Pearl Harbor, and later served as the hub for all Marine aviation units heading into combat in the Pacific Theater during World War II. The base was closed in 1952 because its runways were too short for jet aircraft, and expansion was impossible due to the proximity of Naval Air Station Barbers Point. Ewa has been abandoned since 1952; however, two of its runways are still visible from the air and many of the revetments still remain in good condition.

== History ==
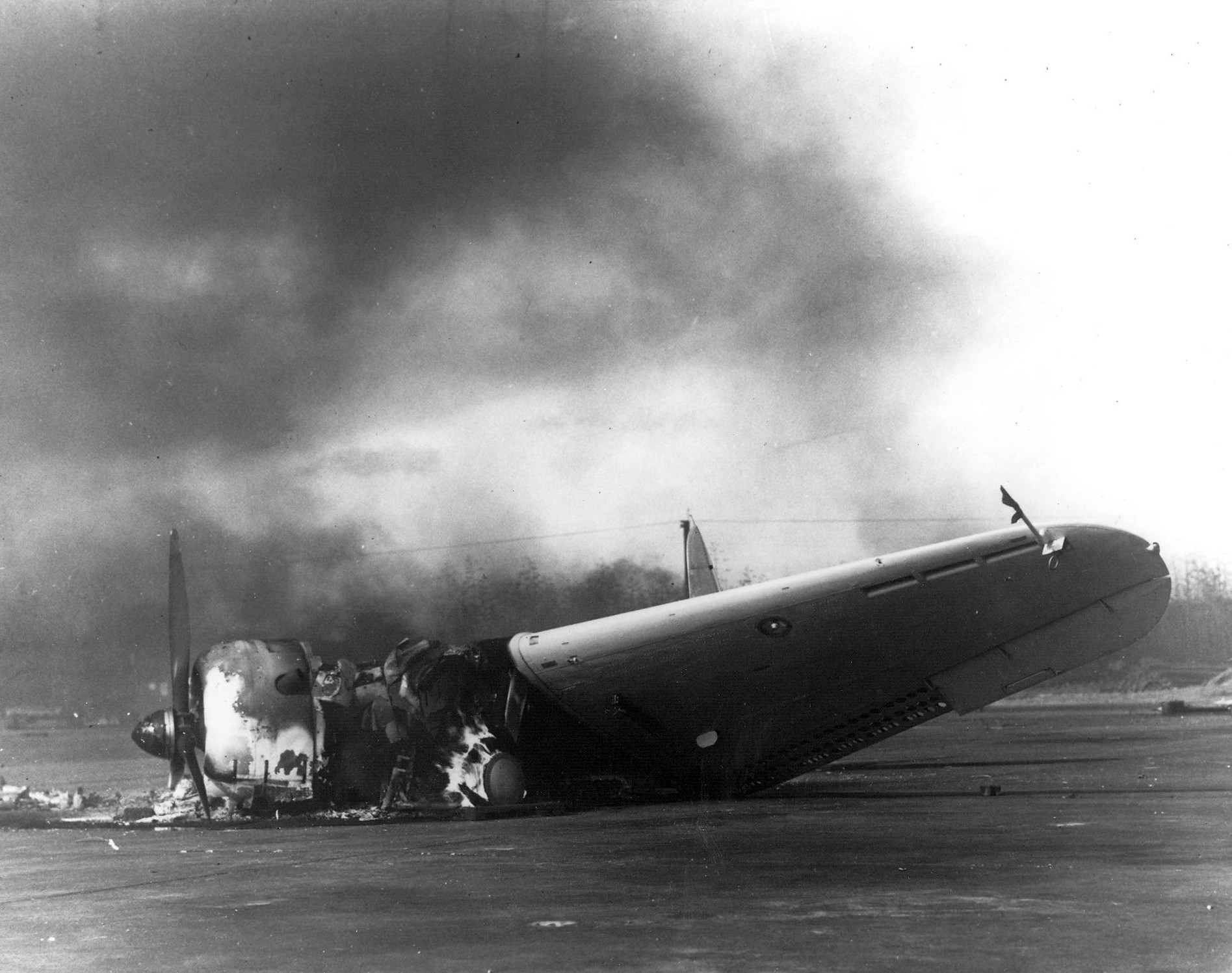
Destroyed SBD from VMSB-232 at Ewa, 7 December 1941.

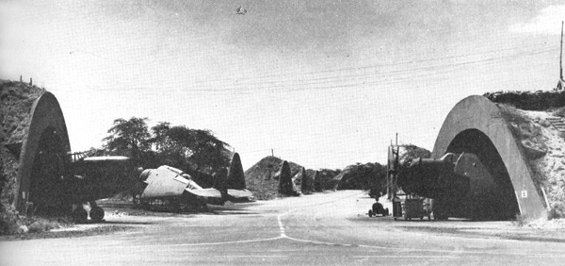
Covered concrete revetments at Ewa

It was founded as an airship base for the United States Navy in 1925, but no airships ever landed there. The USS Shenandoah crashed in Ohio in 1925, the USS Akron was destroyed in 1933 and the USS Macon in 1935, leading to the cancellation of the airship program. The base's upgrade to an air station began in September 1940, and on 3 February 1941, it was commissioned Marine Corps Air Station Ewa.

By the onset of World War II, the air station had four runways and numerous hangars. On 7 December 1941, MCAS Ewa was the first installation hit during the attack on Pearl Harbor. All forty-eight aircraft based there were destroyed, although the runway was not bombed and remained serviceable. During the attack, an Aichi D3A dive bomber was shot down by pilots George Welch and Kenneth Taylor in their P-40s above the Station. Private William Turner and Sergeant Emil Peters also fired at the Japanese planes from a tail gunner's position on a grounded SBD dive bombers. Turner and Peters managed to shoot down at least one Japanese plane during the attack. Shot in the abdomen, Private Turner died on December 12. He was posthumously awarded the Bronze Star.

In April 1944, the 3rd Marine Aircraft Wing was relocated to MCAS Ewa where they stayed for the remainder of the war.

The start of the Korean War saw another surge in activity at MCAS Ewa, but because the runways were becoming more and more unsuitable for jet aircraft, the Marine Corps shifted its aviation assets to Marine Corps Air Station Kaneohe Bay. Ewa was officially closed on 18 June 1952, and its property assumed by Naval Air Station Barbers Point.

== Redevelopment ==
In 2008, the US Navy announced they would be leasing 499 acres (2.02 km^{2}) of the old air station to Ford Island Properties, who plan on building expensive homes and shopping centers to create an urban center for Kapolei. The Navy has said that 4 to 5 acres (20,000 m^{2}) of the base near the center of the old runways qualifies for the National Register of Historic Places, while some locals looking to preserve the field were trying to rally support to make it a National Cemetery. The Navy and Ford Island Properties were expected to conclude their lease agreement in August 2008.

In 2013 the Honolulu City Council moved forward on a plan to have a road built over the airfield.

In 2018 The Louis Berger company was commissioned by Hunt Development Corp (Ford Island properties) to provide an Ewa Battlefield preservation plan.

== See also ==
- History of the United States Marine Corps
- List of United States Marine Corps Air Stations
