= VMFA-134 =

Marine Fighter Attack Squadron 134
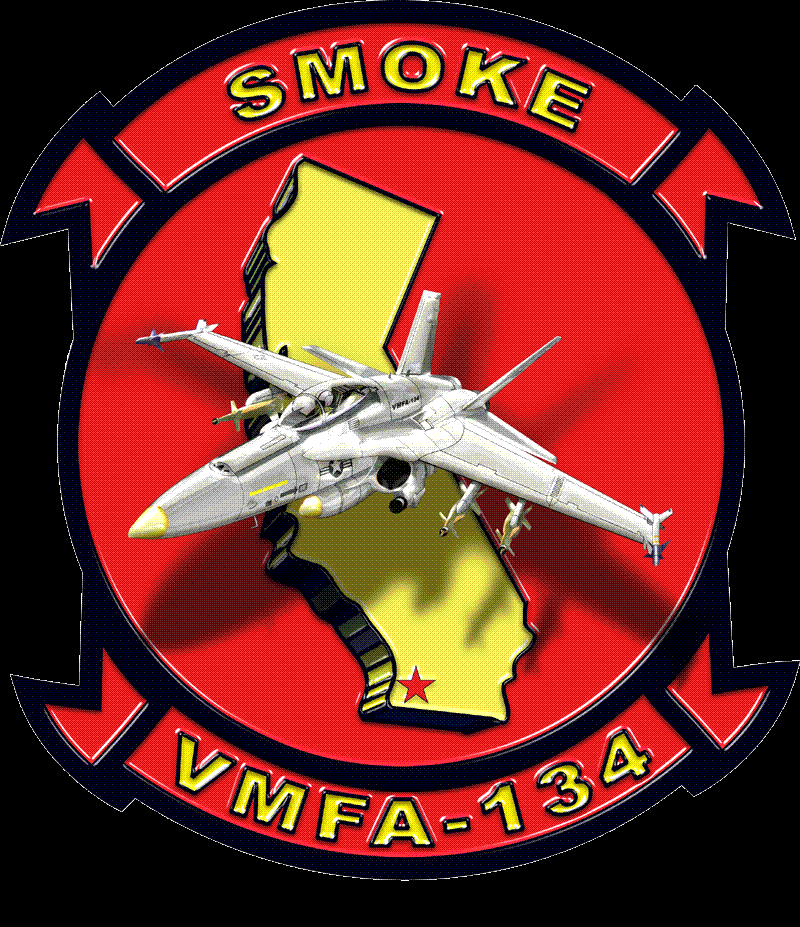
- VMFA-134 Insignia
- Active: 1 March 1943 - 30 April 1946; 15 April 1958 – 1 April 2007
- Country: United States
- Branch: United States Marine Corps
- Type: Fighter/Attack
- Role: Close air support Air interdiction Aerial reconnaissance
- Part of: Inactive
- Nickname(s): "Smoke"
- Motto(s): "Smoke'em if you got'em"
- Tail Code: MF
- Engagements: World War II; Operation Iraqi Freedom

Aircraft flown
- Attack: Douglas A-4 Skyhawk (1971-1983)
- Bomber: Grumman TBF Avenger (1943-46)
- Fighter: Grumman F9F Cougar (1956 - ?); McDonnell-Douglas F-4 Phantom II (1983-1989); F/A-18 Hornet (1989-2008)

Marine Fighter Attack Squadron 134 (VMFA-134) was a reserve F/A-18 Hornet squadron in the United States Marine Corps. Known as "Smoke", the squadron was based at Marine Corps Air Station Miramar, California and fell under Marine Aircraft Group 46 (MAG-46) and the 4th Marine Aircraft Wing (4th MAW). On 1 April 2007, the squadron was transitioned to cadre status and its gear and personnel were redistributed throughout the remaining F/A-18 Hornet squadrons.

== Mission ==
Conduct air-to-air and air-to-ground operations in support of U.S. Marine Corps ground troops.

== History ==
=== World War II ===
Marine Scout Bombing Squadron 134 (VMSB-134) was activated on 1 May 1943, at Marine Corps Air Station Santa Barbara, California, and assigned to Marine Base Defense Aircraft Group 42, Marine Fleet Air, West Coast. Shortly thereafter it was redesignated as Marine Torpedo Bombing Squadron 134 (VMTB-134) on 1 June 1943. From October to November 1943 the squadron deployed to Espiritu Santo, New Hebrides, and detached from the Marine Base Defense Aircraft Wing. In November 1943 the squadron was reassigned to Marine Aircraft Group 11, 1st Marine Aircraft Wing.

During the course of World War II the squadron supported operations on Bougainville, the Bismarck Archipelago and Peleliu. Following these campaigns the squadron went through numerous reassignments to include the following:

- Reassigned during January 1944 to Marine Aircraft Group 24.
- Reassigned during March 1944 to Marine Aircraft Group 14.
- Reassigned during May 1944 to Marine Aircraft Group 12.
- Reassigned during June 1944 to Marine Aircraft Group 11, 2nd Marine Aircraft Wing.
- Reassigned during December 1944 to Marine Aircraft Group 11, 4th Marine Aircraft Wing.

Following the war, VMTB-134 was assigned to Qingdao, China during October 1945 to participate in the occupation of Northern China from October 1945 to April 1946. During this time they were again reassigned in November 1945 to Marine Aircraft Group 32, 1st Marine Aircraft Wing and to Marine Aircraft Group 12 in April 1946 upon their return from China. The squadron was deactivated on 30 April 1946.

=== 1958-1986 ===
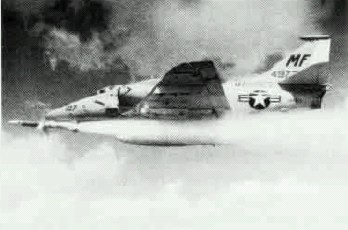
A VMA-134 A-4F firing an AGM-45 Shrike in 1981.

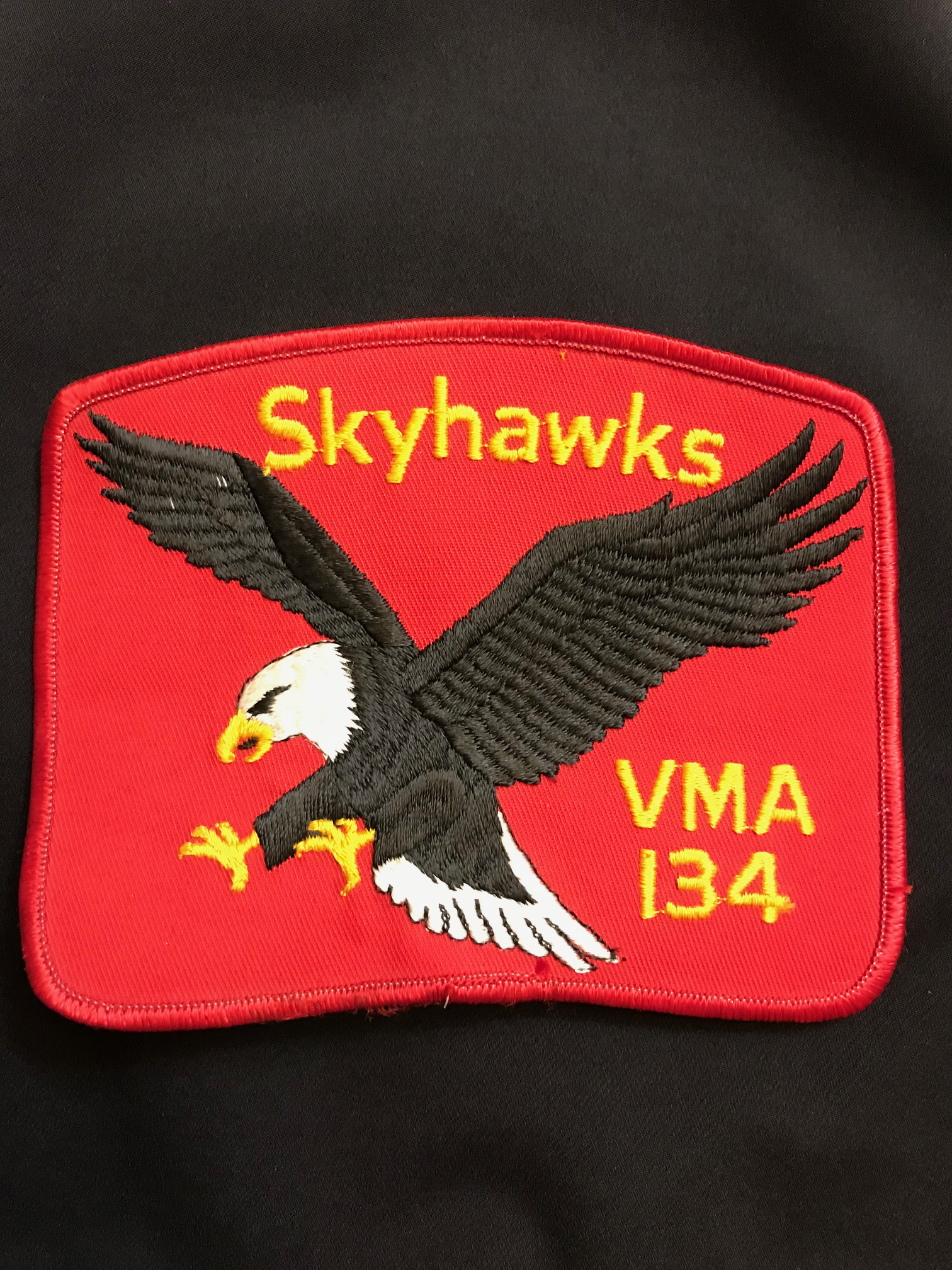
VMA-134 Skyhawks Patch

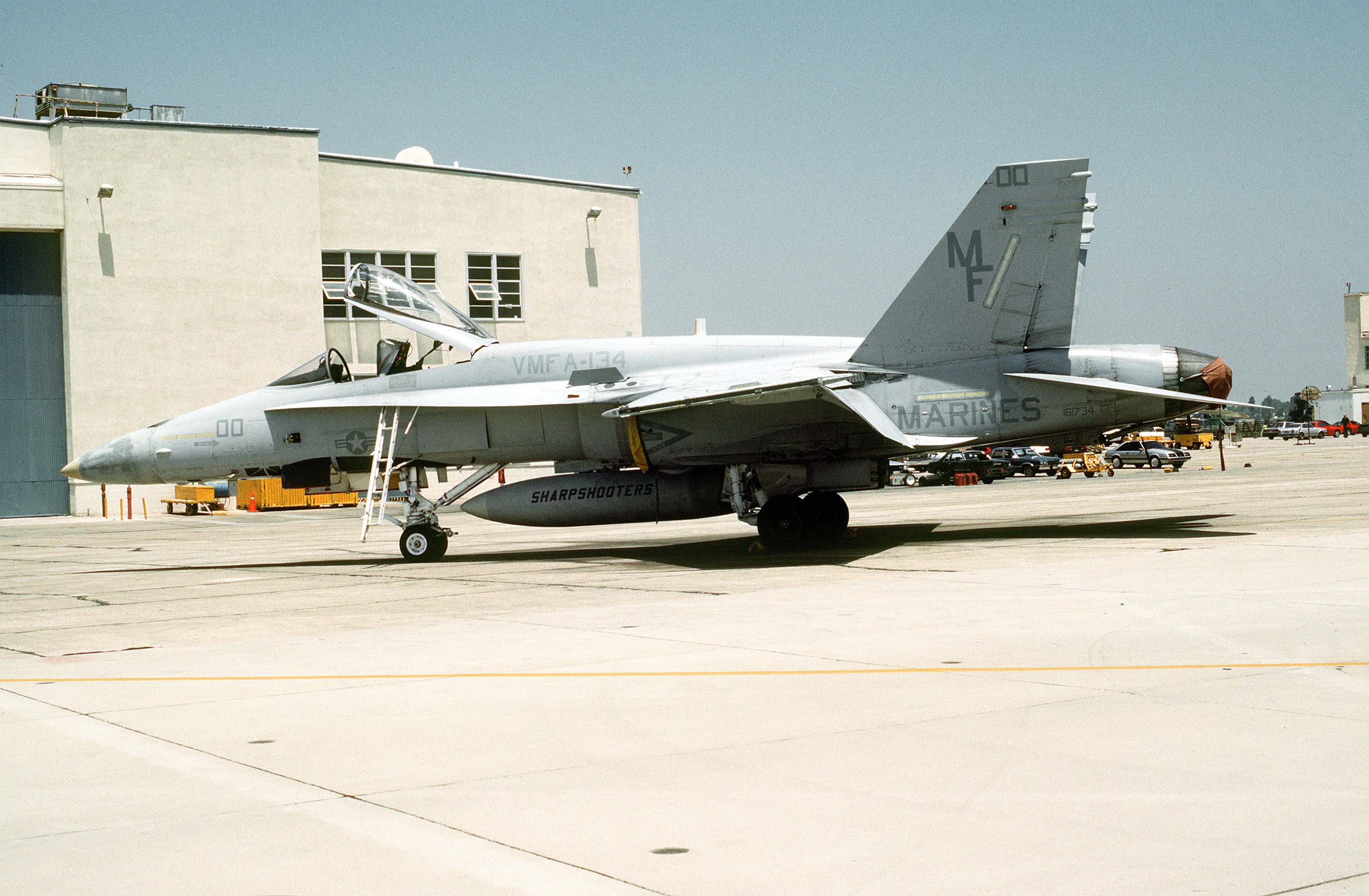
A VMFA-134 F/A-18A in 1993.

The squadron was reactivated on 15 April 1958, at Naval Air Station Los Alamitos, California, as Marine Fighter Squadron 134 (VMF-134) in the Marine Air Reserve.

Redesignated again on 1 July 1962, as Marine Attack Squadron 134 (VMA-134), Marine Air Reserve Training Detachment, Marine Air Reserve Training Command, Los Alamitos, California. In February 1965 they were again reassigned to Marine Aircraft Group 43, 4th Marine Aircraft Wing. 1971 saw the squadron move to Marine Corps Air Station El Toro, California, assigned to Marine Aircraft Group 46, flying Douglas A-4F (Skyhawk) aircraft and with squadron designation of, [the] Skyhawks. The last redesignation of the squadron occurred on 1 October 1983, as Marine Fighter Attack Squadron 134 with transition to the F-4 Phantom II, still attached to MAG 46.

=== 1990s & 2000s ===
On 21 July 2004, two F/A-18 Hornets of VMFA-134 suffered a mid-air collision over the Columbia River, 120 miles east of Portland, Oregon, shortly after 1430, killing both Marines in F/A-18B, BuNo 162870. The pilot of F/A-18A, BuNo 163097, 'MF-04', ejected and landed nearby on a hillside west of Arlington, Oregon, suffering minor injuries. The fighters were on their way to the Boardman Air Force Range, where the Oregon Air National Guard trains, when they collided. Another spokesman told the Associated Press that the planes were on a low-altitude training exercise.

=== Future Plans ===
VMFA-134 is expected to make a return in 2031, flying the F-35C out of MCAS Miramar according to the current transition plan.

== In Popular Media ==
In the seventh season episode of The West Wing "The Mommy Problem" an F/A-18 with the call sign 'Badger' belonging to VMFA-134 is shown being piloted by Democratic presidential candidate Matt Santos (Jimmy Smits) as part of his USMC Reserve duty.

== Awards ==
- Navy Unit Commendation Streamer
  - Peleliu - 1944
- Asiatic - Pacific Campaign Streamer with Three Bronze Stars
- World War II Victory Streamer
- China Service Streamer

== See also ==
- United States Marine Corps Aviation
- List of United States Marine Corps aircraft squadrons
- List of decommissioned United States Marine Corps aircraft squadrons
