= Marine Aviation Logistics Squadron 24 =

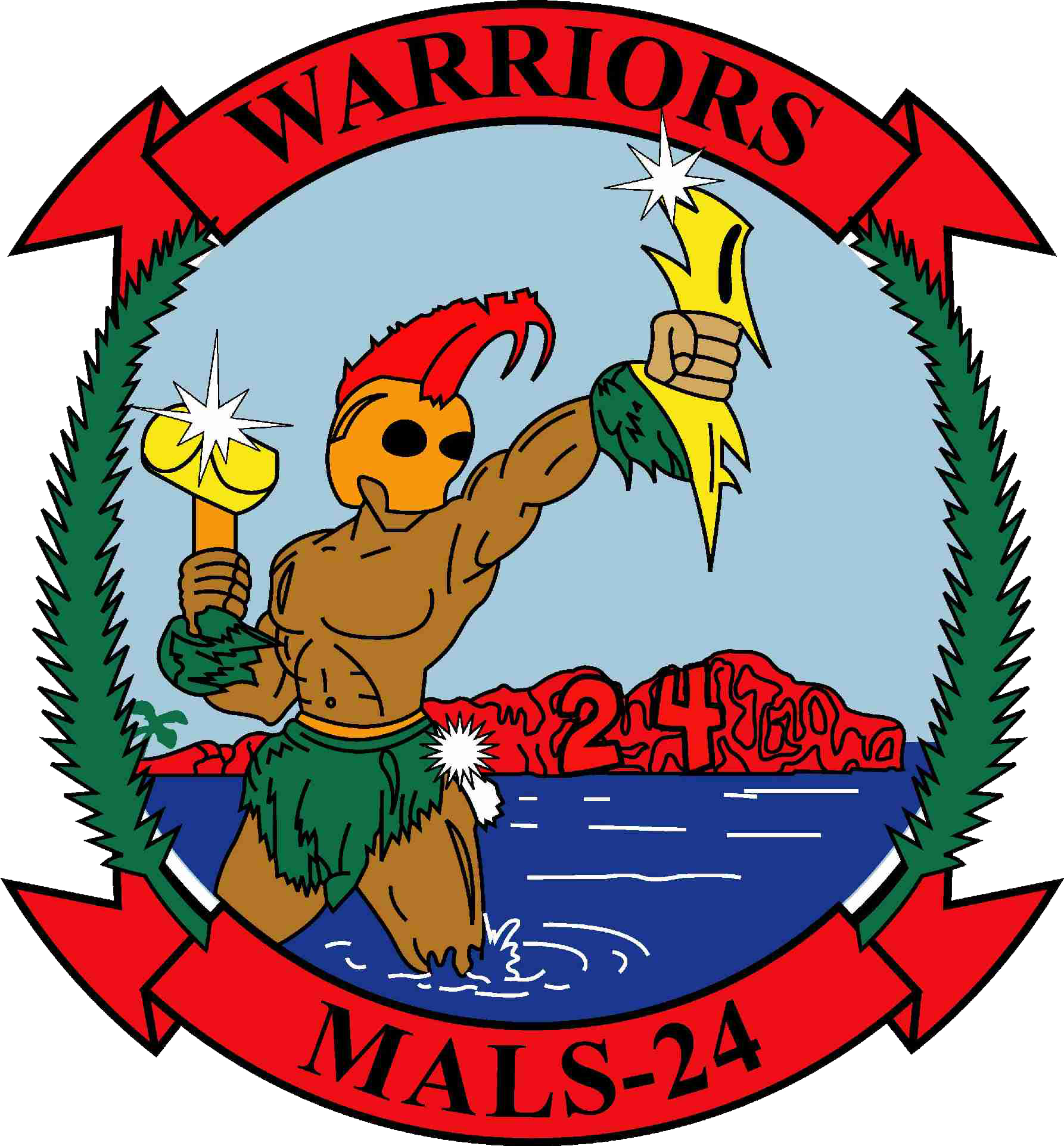
- MALS-24 Insignia
- Active: 1 March 1942 – present
- Country: United States
- Allegiance: United States of America
- Branch: United States Marine Corps
- Type: Logistics
- Role: Aviation logistics support
- Part of: Marine Aircraft Group 24; 1st Marine Aircraft Wing
- Garrison/HQ: Marine Corps Base Hawaii
- Nickname(s): Warriors
- Engagements: World War II * Battle of Bougainville * Philippines campaign (1944–1945)

Commanders
- Current commander: LtCol S. B. Carey

Marine Aviation Logistics Squadron 24 (MALS-24) is an aviation logistics support unit of the United States Marine Corps. Known as the "Warriors", they fall under the command of Marine Aircraft Group 24 (MAG-24) and the 1st Marine Aircraft Wing (1st MAW) and are currently based at Marine Corps Base Hawaii.

== Mission ==
Provide aviation logistics support, guidance, planning and direction to Marine Aircraft Group squadrons on behalf of the commanding officer, as well as logistics support for Navy funded equipment in the supporting Marine Wing Support Squadron (MWSS), Marine Air Control Group (MACG), and Marine Aircraft Wing/Mobile Calibration Complex (MAW/MCC).

- Provide intermediate level maintenance for aircraft and aeronautical equipment of all supported units and, when authorized, perform first-degree repair on specific engines.
- Provide aviation supply support for aircraft and Navy-funded equipment to all supported units.
- Provide Class V(a) ammunition logistics support to the MAG's squadrons. This support encompasses the requisitioning, storage, handling, assembly, transportation, and inventory reporting of Class V(a) ammunition. Be capable of planning for, and operating, an airfield ammunition issue point at expeditionary airfields.
- Interpret, implement, audit, inspect, and provide oversight for the MAG, CO, of all policies and procedures relating to the administration and management of operations and maintenance, Navy funds, aviation supply, and aircraft.

== History ==
=== World War II ===
The squadron was commissioned on March 1, 1942 at Marine Corps Air Station Ewa, Oahu, Hawaii, as Headquarters and Service Squadron 24 and assigned to Marine Aircraft Group 24, 2nd Marine Aircraft Wing. The squadron deployed during March 1942 to Efate, New Hebrides where it helped establish an airfield near the capital city of Port Vila. The squadron departed Efate in June 1942, arriving at Marine Corps Air Station Santa Barbara, California on June 15, 1942. On July 1, 1942 the squadron was redesignated as Headquarters Squadron 24.

The squadron redeployed during September 1943 to Efate, New Hebrides, and were reassigned to the 1st Marine Aircraft Wing. They participated in the Battle of Bougainville and the Philippines campaign (1944–1945). In September–October 1945 they were moved to Beiping, China and participated in the occupation of North China from October 1946 to April 1947. MALS-24 was relocated during May–July 1949 to Marine Corps Air Station Cherry Point, North Carolina and assigned to the 2nd Marine Aircraft Wing.

=== 1949–1967 ===
The squadron was again redesignated on February 15, 1954 as Headquarters and Maintenance Squadron 24 (H&MS-24). During the Korean War, the squadron served as a training unit for Marines being rotated into South Korea. The unit also participated in the Cuban Missile Crisis in November 1962.

=== 1968 – present ===
MALS-24 (designated H&MS-24 at this time) was relocated to Kaneohe Bay, Hawaii in April, 1968 and reassigned to the 1st Marine Brigade. During the late 70's, then Cpl Carlton W. Kent, who would later become the 16th Sgt. Major of the Marine Corps served in MAG-24 Group Supply (designation at the time). Group Supply was under the leadership of Lt. Col. Fred Anthes. Under LT Col Anthes' command, the Not Operational Ready Supply (NORS) section received the first ever a Certificate of Commendation from Brigadier General H.T. Hagaman. The award was presented for significant improvement in ensuring all aviation elements were operationally prepared for rotation. They were redesignated 5 October 1988 as Marine Aviation Logistics Squadron 24. They were again redesignated 1 October 1994 as Marine Aviation Logistics Support Element, Kaneohe, and assigned to Aviation Support Element, 1st Marine Aircraft Wing, III Marine Expeditionary Force. In February 2002, the squadron reverted to Marine Aviation Logistics Squadron 24.

== See also ==
- United States Marine Corps Aviation
- Organization of the United States Marine Corps
- List of United States Marine Corps aviation support units
