= Marine Aircraft Group 24 =

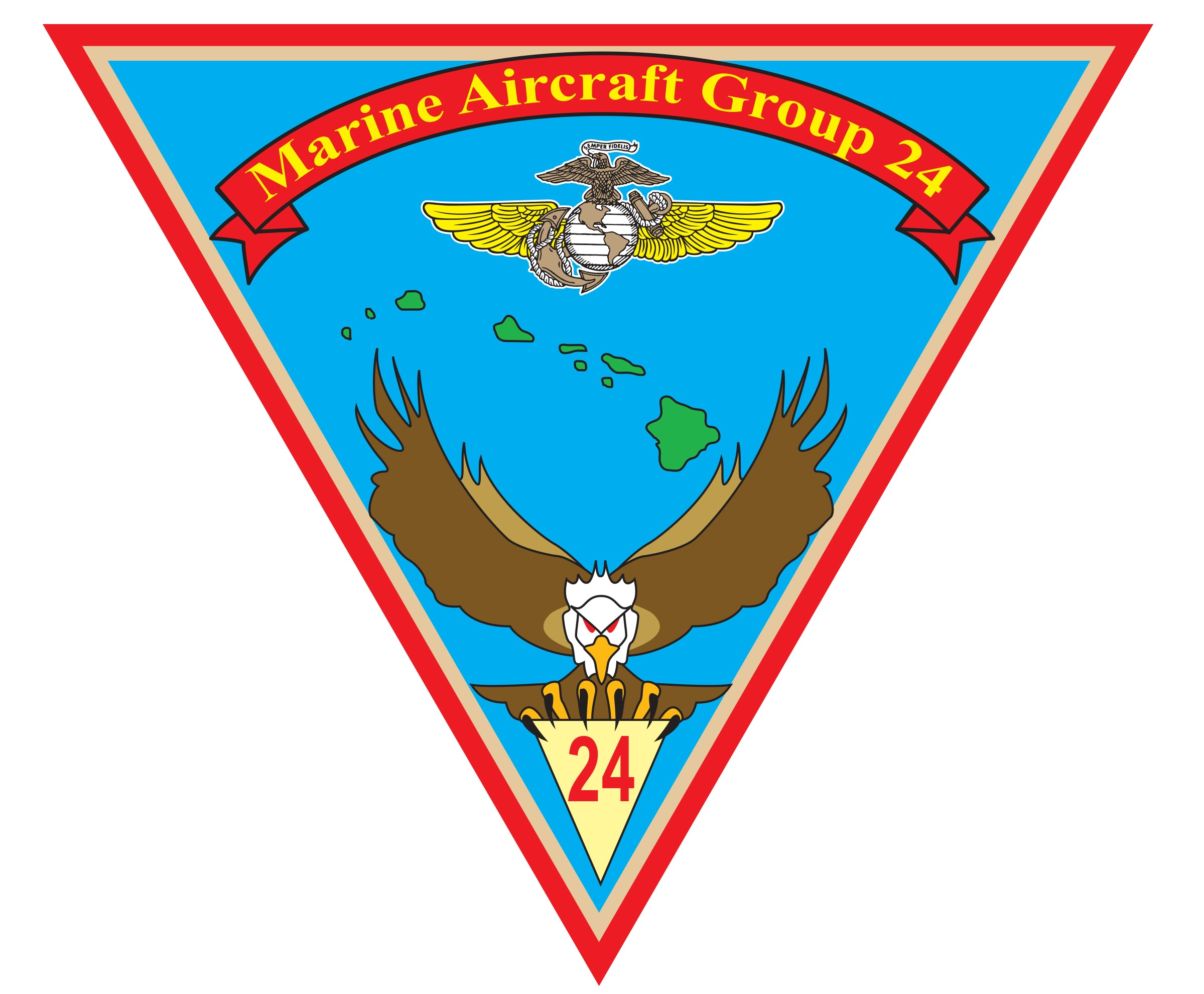
- MAG-24 Insignia
- Active: 1 March 1942 – present
- Country: United States
- Allegiance: United States of America
- Branch: United States Marine Corps
- Type: Rotary wing
- Role: Assault support
- Part of: 1st Marine Aircraft Wing; III Marine Expeditionary Force
- Garrison/HQ: Marine Corps Air Facility Kaneohe Bay
- Engagements: World War II: Bougainville Campaign; Philippines campaign (1944–45); Operation Desert Storm; Operation Enduring Freedom; Operation Iraqi Freedom

Commanders
- Current commander: Col. Michael A. Blejski
- Notable commanders: William L. McKittrick (1943–1944); Lewis H. Delano (1944); Lyle H. Meyer (1944-1945); Warren E. Sweetser (1945)

Marine Aircraft Group 24 (MAG-24) is a United States Marine Corps aviation unit based at Marine Corps Air Station Kaneohe Bay. MAG-24 is subordinate to the 1st Marine Aircraft Wing and the III Marine Expeditionary Force (III MEF).

== Mission ==
To provide combat-ready, expeditionary aviation forces capable of short-notice, worldwide employment to a Marine Air Ground Task Force.

== Current Subordinate units ==
The following units are subordinate to MAG-24:

- Marine Aerial Refueler Transport Squadron 153 (VMGR-153) – Hercules
- Marine Medium Tiltrotor Squadron 268 (VMM-268) – Red Dragons
- Marine Medium Tiltrotor Squadron 363 (VMM-363) – Lucky Red Lions
- Marine Unmanned Aerial Vehicle Squadron 3 (VMU-3) – Phantoms
- Marine Aviation Logistics Squadron 24 (MALS-24) – Warriors
- Marine Wing Support Squadron 174 (MWSS-174) – Gryphons

== History ==
=== World War II ===
==== Activation (1 March 1942) ====
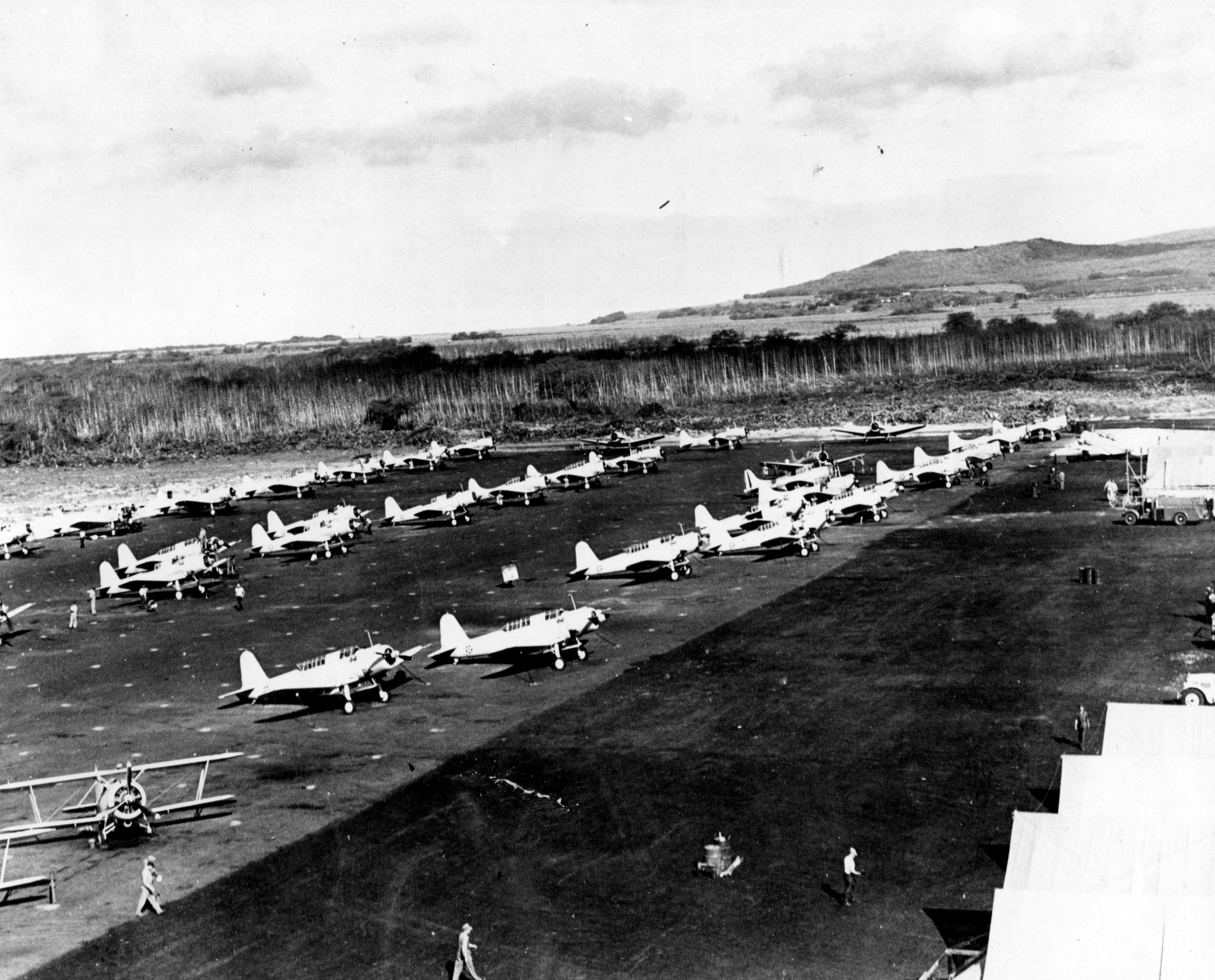
Long rows of planes being secured after the days flights, dot the entire length and breadth of the now fully completed runway #11

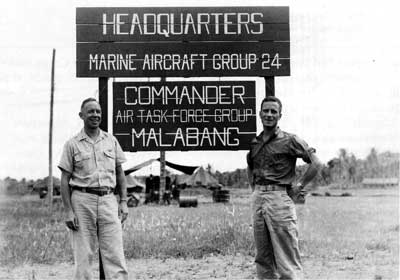
Col Warren E. Sweetser, Jr., left, commanded MAG-24 in June 1945. His executive officer, LtCol John H. Earle, Jr., is on the right

MAG-24 was activated along with Marine Aircraft Group 23 (MAG-23) at Marine Corps Air Station Ewa on 1 March 1942 and attached to the 2nd Marine Aircraft Wing (2d MAW) (which had only been activated in Jan 1941). MCAS Ewa was located on southwest Oahu and adjacent Naval Air Station Barbers Point. The intended use of MAG-24 was to "fill the need of dive-bombers in combat areas". MAG-24 was first commanded by Maj I.L. Kimes and consisted of only two squadrons (VMF-211 and VMF-212) mostly on paper. Both MAG-24 and MAG-23 struggled along without aircraft for several months as almost all available assets were diverted to Midway or elsewhere. The only aircraft available to both MAGs were a few overhauled SBD-1s and SBD-2s which were, according to LtCol Claude Larkin: "no good but gave us something to fly". The activation of MAG-24 and MAG-23 were the result of a major organizational overhaul of Marine Aviation which included the activation of MAG-11, 12, and 14 at Camp Kearny, California, MAG-13 in San Diego, and MAG-22 at Midway.

==== Runway Construction in Efate, New Hebrides (March – May 1942) ====
Two weeks after the activation of MAG-24, on 15 March, the Headquarters Squadron commanded by Capt John K. Little departed for Efate, New Hebrides to help construct an airfield. The importance of Efate to the U.S. war effort was its relative location. Admiral Ernest King, Chief of Naval Operations, stated: "let Efate be the first rung in a ladder from which a step-by-step general advance could be made through the New Hebrides, Solomons, and Bismarcks". Over the next 24 months, the Allies accomplished exactly that. While never attacked by the Japanese at Efate, the efforts to construct the airfield were hampered by a lack of appropriate engineering equipment and malaria. Capt Little and the men of MAG-24 received a letter of commendation from Brig Gen Neal C. Johnson, USA for work completed "in the face of tremendous odds". Simultaneously during this period VMF-212 was transferred from MAG-24 to MAG-21 and deployed from Ewa to Efate over the period of 29 April to 9 June. Efate would be significant in addition to the "first rung". The airfield was used as a place of respite and training for rotating squadrons to the front line. Additionally, the 3rd Marine Division used the island for amphibious rehearsals to incorporating lessons learned from Guadalcanal. The Headquarters Squadron of MAG-24 departed Efate for MCAS Santa Barbara on 24 May and by August 1942 the airfield had a 6000 ft runway capable of supporting combat operations for Guadalcanal.

==== Marine Corps Air Station Santa Barbara (June 1942 – January 1943) ====
In the period between May 1942 and December 1943, MAG-24 moved several times as the war in the Pacific escalated. In June 1942, MAG-24 was the first unit at the newly opened MCAS Santa Barbara with only 12 Officers and 125 men. At first, MCAS Santa Barbara was more like an advanced island base, and the air station was initially nicknamed "the Swamp". Heavy rains and the tide often flooded the field requiring 4-wheel drive Jeeps to get anywhere. Pilots would also jokingly ask for clearance to land on the "Santa Barbara Lake". Because a Japanese submarine had just shelled the nearby Ellwood Oil Field on 23 February 1942 the Marines were given a warm welcome as the protectors of Santa Barbara. One week, this warm welcome resulted in 15 weddings being performed by the MAG-24 chaplain. MAG-24 initially stood port/starboard watch to thwart any further attacks from the Japanese by building fighting holes and manning defensive positions on the coast adjoining the airfield. Initially the airfield only had one aircraft, a Grumman J2F Duck, that was loaded with depth charges should a Japanese submarine return. Eventually the Duck was joined by a SNJ-3 Texan, and a SBC-4 Helldiver biplane. However, by the fall of 1942, MAG-24 was composed of VMSB-143, VMSB-144, VMSB-242, VMSB-243, and VMSB-244, all flying the SBD Dauntless. Once appropriately equipped, MAG-24 underwent an accelerated training program in preparation for combat duty. By January 1943, MAG-24 was returning to MCAS Ewa aboard the USS Mormachawk, and then assigned to the 4th Marine Base Defense Aircraft Wing. MAG-24 Headquarters Squadron would remain at MCAS Ewa, but attached personnel found themselves at Midway Atoll, Johnston Atoll, and Palmyra Atoll until it was MAG-24's turn to deploy into the Pacific theater.

==== Invasion of Bougainville (September 1943 – December 1944) ====
F4U's Corsairs on Tokorina Point Airstrip

In September 1943, MAG-24 joined the Pacific campaign when it deployed to Efate, New Hebrides. Efate was the gateway to the Pacific conflict; units remained there for 2–4 weeks for training and receiving replacements. Assigned to Marine Air Wing South Pacific (MASP), MAG-24 was assigned the mission of local air defense awaiting deployment to the front line. While the squadrons assigned to MAG-24 were in constant rotation, the MASP consisted of five fighter squadrons (VMF), three dive-bomber squadrons (VMSB), and three torpedo bombing squadrons (VMTB). Concurrently during the MAG-24 deployment was the landing and occupation of Arundel Island and the isolation of Kolombangara as the Allied forces completed the campaign for New Georgia. During this time, the air war at the front line consisted of fighter sweeps and bombing runs as the Allied forces advanced towards Bougainville. Throughout September and into October the Japanese airfields on the island of Bougainville were bombed steadily and with increasing intensity.

On 17 November 1943, MAG-24 moved to Banika, part of the Russell Islands, where they would support the invasion of Bougainville until the allied airfields were complete on the island objective. The yet to be built airfields on Bougainville would support the "short-legged, sharpshooting", SBD Dauntless dive-bombers and TBF Avenger torpedo-bombers that were needed to sink Japanese ships and destroy the guns at the strategic stronghold of Rabaul. Rabaul was a strategic deep-water harbor that the Japanese captured in 1942, and fortified. The Bougainville campaign, utilizing maneuver warfare, bypassed all but 2,000 of 40,000 Japanese forces on the island to seize a beachhead of 6 by 8 miles at Cape Torokina. Cape Torokina was naturally defendable but mired in swamps and midway between the bulk of enemy forces on the north and south ends of the island. The landing on Bougainville started on 1 November 1943, and 31 TBFs and 8 SBDs completed pre-landing aviation fires, which were commended by the Commander of Southern Pacific Forces for timing, execution, and reducing resistance. The landing force would consist of the 3rd Marine Division (including 3rd Marine Regiment) and the 2nd Raider Regiment.[9] Robert Sherrod, a war correspondent who accompanied Marines from Tarawa to Okinawa, would later comment: "the audacious attack at Cape Torokina caught the Rabaul admirals napping; the landing was in the best hit-'em-where-they-ain’t tradition".

The air war over the island of Bougainville would continue to intensify as significant Japanese air power from Rabaul, combined with reinforcement from enemy carriers, attacked the beachhead on Bougainville. On 8 November alone, more than a hundred Japanese Zeros and bombers attacked the Allied forces. The Allies lost only eight aircraft as compared to 26 Japanese planes. During an ill-conceived attack on nearby Allied ships, the Japanese lost another 41 aircraft on 11 November. Because of these losses, the Japanese pulled all carrier aviation out of the fight for Bougainville on 13 November. By 16 November, the Japanese had lost a total of 70 planes from Rabaul, and 121 from the carrier forces. From this point on, the air war over Bougainville would calm to small scale attacks that occurred mostly at night.

On 9 December, ground crews from VMF-212 and VMF-215 arrived at Cape Torokina a day before completion of the first airstrip. On 21 December, MAG-24 came to Bougainville where the group commander (LtCol William McKittrick) assumed command of Air Operations Bougainville. Two days later the MAG-24 Service Squadron would arrive to help complete the construction of the Piva North airstrip (ultimately Bougainville would host three airfields; Cape Torokina, Piva North, and Piva South). By 5 Jan, the airfields at Bougainville were usable to start striking Rabaul. While the first two missions were unsuccessful, the third on 9 January knocked out the Tobera airfield and 21 Japanese fighters. Beginning 12 January, seven squadrons of SBDs and TBFs from Bougainville along with other allied medium and heavy bombers (over 200 in total) would bomb Rabaul every day. Typically the TBFs would keep the airfields surrounding Rabaul out of commission while the SBDs with their greater precision would destroy the anti-aircraft guns protecting the airfields.

IN A READY ROOM ON BOUGAINVILLE, Marine fighter pilots gather around their flight leader to get some last minute pointers before they take off on a bomber escort mission against Rabaul.

The next task for the aircraft based at Bougainville was the destruction of Japanese shipping. The first occurred on 14 January, where bomber Division Leader Lt Reginald Dover earned the Distinguished Flying Cross for successfully dropping a bomb down the AK Transport Smoke Stake, sinking the ship with one hit. Overall the mission resulted in 29 aircraft destroyed during the dogfights after the strike. The second, on 17 January, would result in the most successful shipping strike since November 1942 when 18 TBFs from VMTB-232 (MAG-24) supported by VMF-211 (MAG-24) reported 15 hits resulting in five Japanese ships sunk. Another attack on the 24th sent another five ships to the bottom. Between the two strikes, the allies also claimed 40 downed enemy aircraft and continued to attrite the Japanese airborne defense. The last significant Japanese air defense occurred on 19 Feb 1944 when 50 Japanese fighters met 140 TBFs, SBDs, F4Us, P-40s, and F6Fs. This final battle resulted in 23 enemy aircraft lost. Due to the loss, the Japanese would pull the majority of their air assets back to Truk on 20 February. By mid-March, the allies would complete strikes without fighter escort. The Rabaul bombing and isolation would continue for 44 months until mid-1945. During this time 10,000 Japanese personnel were killed, and the strategic stronghold of Rabaul would remain isolated from all Japanese lines of communication for the remainder of the war.

Members of a torpedo bomber crew prepare to leave from Bougainville air strip on a strike at Rabaul. In center is the pilot; to his left is the turret gunner; to right, radio-gunner.

==== Battle of Bougainville Perimeter (March 1944) ====
While the allied forces, including MAG-24, continued to pulverize Rabaul the remaining Japanese forces on Bougainville under Gen Harukichi Hyakutake finally realized that there would be no more ground force invasions on the island. At the end of December, the Japanese troops finally started moving to attack the captured beachhead airfields near Cape Torokina. During this time the Marines of 1st Marine Amphibious Corps (including 3rd Marines) were relieved by the U.S. Army's Americal Division and continued the defensive position buildup. MAG-24 was assigned defense of the north sector around Piva Uncle and organized into two infantry type battalions of four companies each to mount the defense. Reinforcing each of the MAG-24 battalions was an Army heavy weapons company. During the battle, the combined allied forces of 27,000 personnel on Bougainville faced 15,000 Japanese infantry and the most field artillery the Japanese had managed to concentrate anywhere in the Pacific. During the battle, MAG-24 consisted of ten squadrons: VMF-211, 212, 215, 218, 222, 223, VMSB-235, 244, and VMTB-134, and 232.

The attacks on the airfields began in earnest on 8 March 1944 and lasted until 24 March. Because of the attacks, all aircraft at Bougainville would be evacuated every night to Barakoma, Munda, or Green Island to return every morning dropping their bombs on enemy positions before landing for the first time. By 10 March 114 SBDs and 45 TBFs would be flying "almost continuously", and were noted for pinpointing the enemy artillery positions with increasing accuracy. During the next few days, the tempo of defensive strikes increased on the hills surrounding the Bougainville airfields. The Allies dropped 123 tons of bombs on 13 March, and 145 tons on the 14th. This increase in bombing quieted Gen Hyakutake's forces (known as "Pistol Pete") for a couple of days. The last attack by Japanese forces was on the night of 23–24 March which was thrown back only a few hours after it started but wounded 16 MAG-24 Marines during the melee. After 16 days of attacks, the Japanese had lost 5,469 men as compared to only 263 men in the allied forces (including MAG-24). General Hyakutake planned another offensive in May but ultimately canceled the operations when his rice rations fell to a third of pre-invasion rations by April and to nothing by September.

Marine move gas and oil drums away from fire caused by a direct hit by Japanese bombers on a gas and oil dump on Bougainville.

All the while the ground crews of MAG-24 tenant squadrons were noted for their efficiency under fire. VMF-215 kept it plane availability at 95% despite a high rate of ulcers, dysentery, malaria, and fatigue. VMSB-244 suffered 10% casualties in ground echelon but claimed the highest availability on the island. The Commander of Air Solomons commended VMSB-235, which had six men wounded in shelling on 18 March, for "untiring efforts, unselfish devotion to duty ... Their disregard of their own personal safety during the shelling of Bougainville airfields, in order that the aircraft assigned to them could operate, is worthy of the highest praise and admiration." Similar recommendations went to other MAG-24 units including: HqSq-24, SMS-24, VMF-218, VMF-223, VMTB-232, and VMTB-134.

==== Preparation for the Philippines (October – December 1944) ====
On 10 October 1944, while still on Bougainville, MAG-24 received a warning order: be prepared to provide Close Air Support to the U.S. Army and Allied forces in the Philippines. This warning order and mission initiated a formative period in which the Marine Corps Close Air Support doctrine was honed and implemented. While some early Close Air Support had been attempted and met with success in Nicaragua during the Interwar period, there was very little doctrine other than defining requirements and no structured development was completed prior to WWII. During Guadalcanal, Air Liaison Parties (ALPs) were improvised, trained on the island, and would only occasionally visit the front lines to observe targets. On New Georgia, the ALPs began briefing a day prior to action, offering occasional improvements. The Bougainville campaign itself marked the beginning of Close Air Support in the modern sense of the term, though it still met with suspicion from ground commanders. Three months before the Bougainville invasion a small ALP school was organized by the 3rd Marine Division Air Officer to teach capabilities and limitations, the procedures for requesting Close Air Support, and the details of air-ground communication. The school was small (only three pilots, and six radiomen) but it would pay dividends in increasing communication (and thus accuracy and lethality) during Bougainville. The most notable use of Close Air Support was the multiple attacks on "Hellzapoppin", ridge where according to the 3rd MARDIV historian "it was the air attacks which proved to be the most effective factor in taking the ridge ... the most successful example of close air support thus far in the Pacific War."

LtCol Keith McCutcheon, the OPSO of MAG-24 (and "head professor" according to war correspondent Robert Sherrod) would expand on previous Close Air Support development by creating a school and coherently assembling all doctrines and procedures. Starting on 14 October 1944, McCutcheon organized and taught 40 lectures which would be given to nearly 500 officers and gunners from both MAG-24 and MAG-32. Importantly, the instructors were then disseminated to other islands to teach the syllabus. The school placed its most significant stress on reliable, adequate, deliberate and thorough communications. The central tenet of the school was that "close support (sic) aviation is only an additional weapon to be employed at the discretion of the ground commander". This tenet was intuitively understood by the seasoned Marines aviators, most of whom had been infantry officers previously. After the academic portion, the formed ALPs had a chance to work out Close Air Support problems over terrain models, static radio nets and finally simulated training runs. They did this with the 37th Army Division, whom they would later support in the Philippines. Furthermore, during this period of schooling, the aviators began to furnish their own ALPs and radio jeeps with the same radio capability as the SBD Dauntless. These ALP jeeps would be attached at the battalion command or higher and directly control the aircraft providing Close Air Support. Previously the 5th Air Force (whom MAG-24 fell under) had furnished their own ALPs which were attached to a Division or higher; request and control were relayed through a centralized communication structure away from the front line. The ALP jeeps and front line control were unorthodox but not entirely new as both the Navy and Army had tried this tactic before. The Marine planners on Bougainville were passionate that given the future mission on the Philippines it would be more efficient and significantly increase the operational tempo to talk the planes onto the target with direct communication. Due to the successful isolation of Rabaul, the preparation for the Philippine campaign was unique in that it gave seasoned aviators a three-month period of training and specializing on the single mission of Close Air Support. This preparation would pay dividends in the Philippines.

==== Luzon Campaign, Philippines (December 1944 – March 1945) ====
On 12 December 1944, MAG-24 moved from Bougainville to stage at Milne Bay, New Guinea for further movement to the Philippines. On 11 January 1945 the MAG CO, Colonel Jerome, and OPSO LtCol McCutcheon, arrived on Luzon to pick the airfield site that eventually became Mangaldan airfield. U.S. Army engineers moved quickly with the construction of Magaldan airfield, and MAG-24 aircraft started arriving on 25 January 1945. For the campaign MAG-24 and MAG-32 would combine to form MAGSDAGUPAN (MAGSD). The first missions would occur on 27 January by VMSB-241 and by 31 Jan MAGSD would host seven squadrons and 174 SBDs. At first, the missions were different than the Close Air Support that MAG-24 had trained for under McCutcheon. The first targets were far behind front lines at San Fernando or Clark Field with the objectives being assigned the previous day using a cumbersome command and control process that required approval all the way up to the Sixth Army. For these first few missions once the Marine dive bombers were in the air no further ground control was furnished.

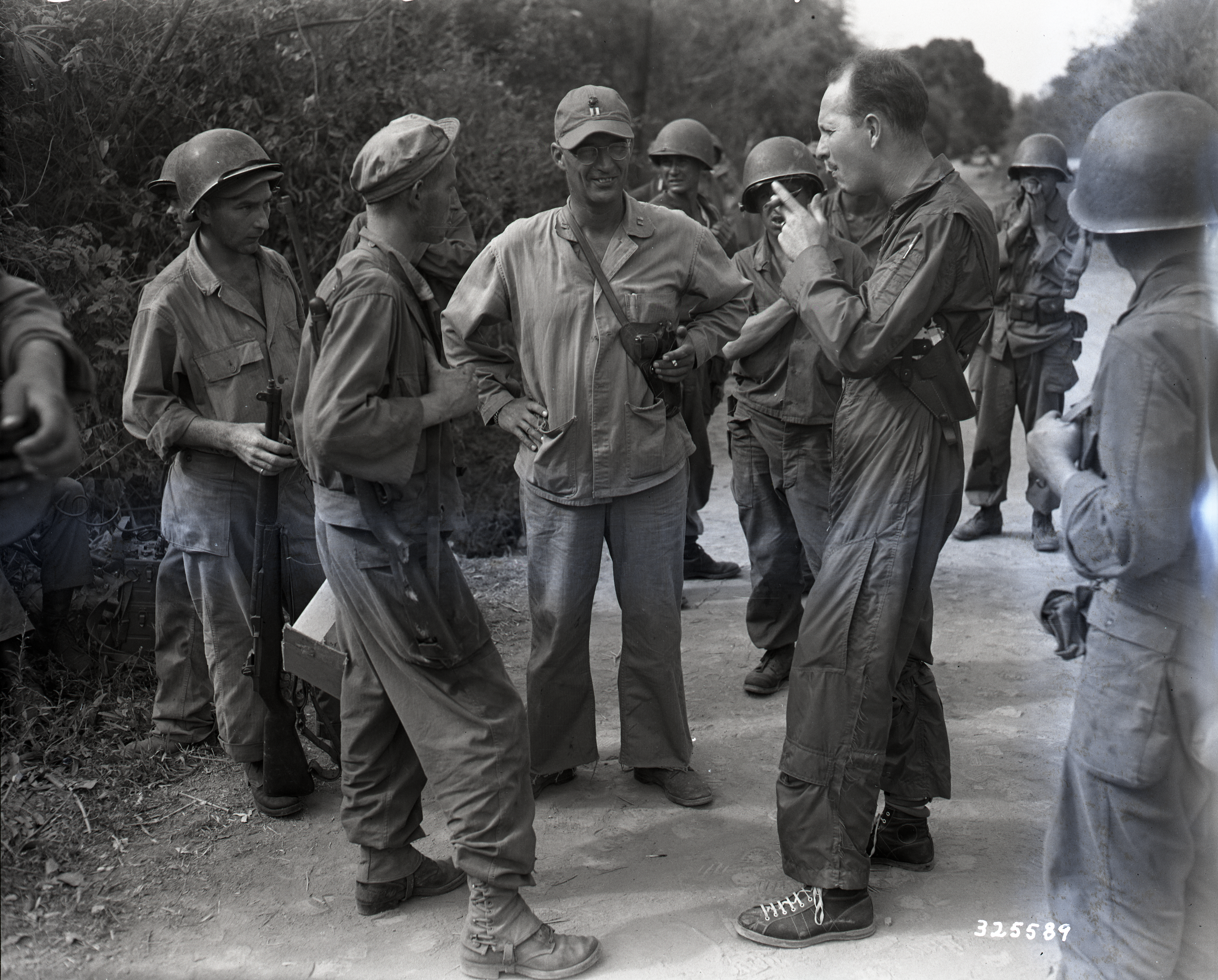
Capt Godolphin (MAG-24, USMC Air Corps) and Major Barr (USMC) who had just bombed suspected Jap positions from the air are down the front within an hour of their strike to learn from infantrymen of the 7th Cav. Regmt about accuracy of their bombing. Location: Between Manila and Anitpolo, Luzon Philippines. Unit: MAG-24

Fortunately, on 31 January Gen MacArthur gave MAGSD opportunity to prove the utility of Close Air Support. General MacArthur ordered the 1st Cavalry division to make an audacious advance of 100 miles to Manila and free the internees at Santo Tomas. The assignment of MAGSD was a unique mission of guarding the 1st Cavalry Division flank with a standing nine plane patrol from dawn until dusk. With some "superior salesmanship and a determination to show the soldiers what Marine flyers, under proper front line control could do for them", the MAGSD was able to attach two Marine ALP jeeps to follow the 1st and 2nd Brigades of the 1st Cavalry. The standing nine plane patrol reconnoitered ahead of the flying column spotting the Japanese positions and routing the forces around ambushes. On 2 February 1945, a portion of the Cavalry was blocked by a Japanese battalion which occupied a ridge that was reported to withstand an entire division. The attached ALP was able to call the SBD patrol to complete multiple shows of force and allowed the Cavalry to route the Japanese without the SBDs firing a shot. The same day the SBD patrol completed an ad-hoc bombing run ahead of the 1st Cavalry line in which all bombs landed within a 200 by 300-yard area and left the target in shambles. Finally, the ALP demonstrated the increased speed of communication when a Regimental commander dashed to one of the MAG ALP jeeps to report a Japanese fighter in the area. An officer in the ALP pointed to a burning fighter 2,000 yards away which had been destroyed by two P-51s the ALP had vectored in. Within 66 hours the 1st Cavalry arrived in Manila, and the Marines of both MAG-24 and MAG-32 had proven their ability to make the innovative changes in Close Air Support work. The MAGs received commendations from both the Brigades and the CG of the 1st Cavalry. However, the division historian summed up the Marines contribution the best: "Much of the success of the entire movement is credited to the superb air cover, flank protection, and reconnaissance provided by the Marine Air Groups 24 and 32."

Despite the successful dash to Manila, the ALPs of MAGSD still had a long way to go convincing the other Army commanders to make maximum use of the Close Air Support that Marine dive-bombers could provide. Ultimately the demonstration that won over one of the most skeptical Army commanders, General Patrick, was an attack on the Shimbu line east of Manila on 8 February 1945. General Patrick was visiting the position of the 1st Cavalry as they called an attack on a ridge that had been drilling heavy machine gun and mortar fire on his troops. Due to the standing order that air support could only fire outside of a 1,000 yardsan, the ALP called the attack on the reverse side of the slope. Marked with white phosphorus, seven SBDs unloaded their bombs accurately to the cheers of the men they were supporting. Afterward, the 1st Cavalry advanced unopposed to find eight machine gun positions, 15 mortar emplacements, and 300 dead. General Patrick was impressed and asked when he could get support like that. When asked about the standing 1,000-yard restriction he retorted: "I don't give a damn how close they hit." General Patrick would use the ALP further on 24 February when the 6th Infantry Division would mount a full attack on the Shimbu line. Capt McConaughy, the assigned ALP officer, stated that the close air support went to "perfection". The attacks were first at 1,000 yards, then 500 yards, and sometimes inside 500 yards. They would work all the tricks such as dummy drops to allow the American infantry to advance while the Japanese heads were down. Afterward, General Patrick insisted on Close Air Support and that all subordinate units submit accurate evaluations of air strikes so that "the air forces will continue to give this command an increasing number of support aircraft".

==== Mindanao Campaign, Philippines (April – September 1945) ====
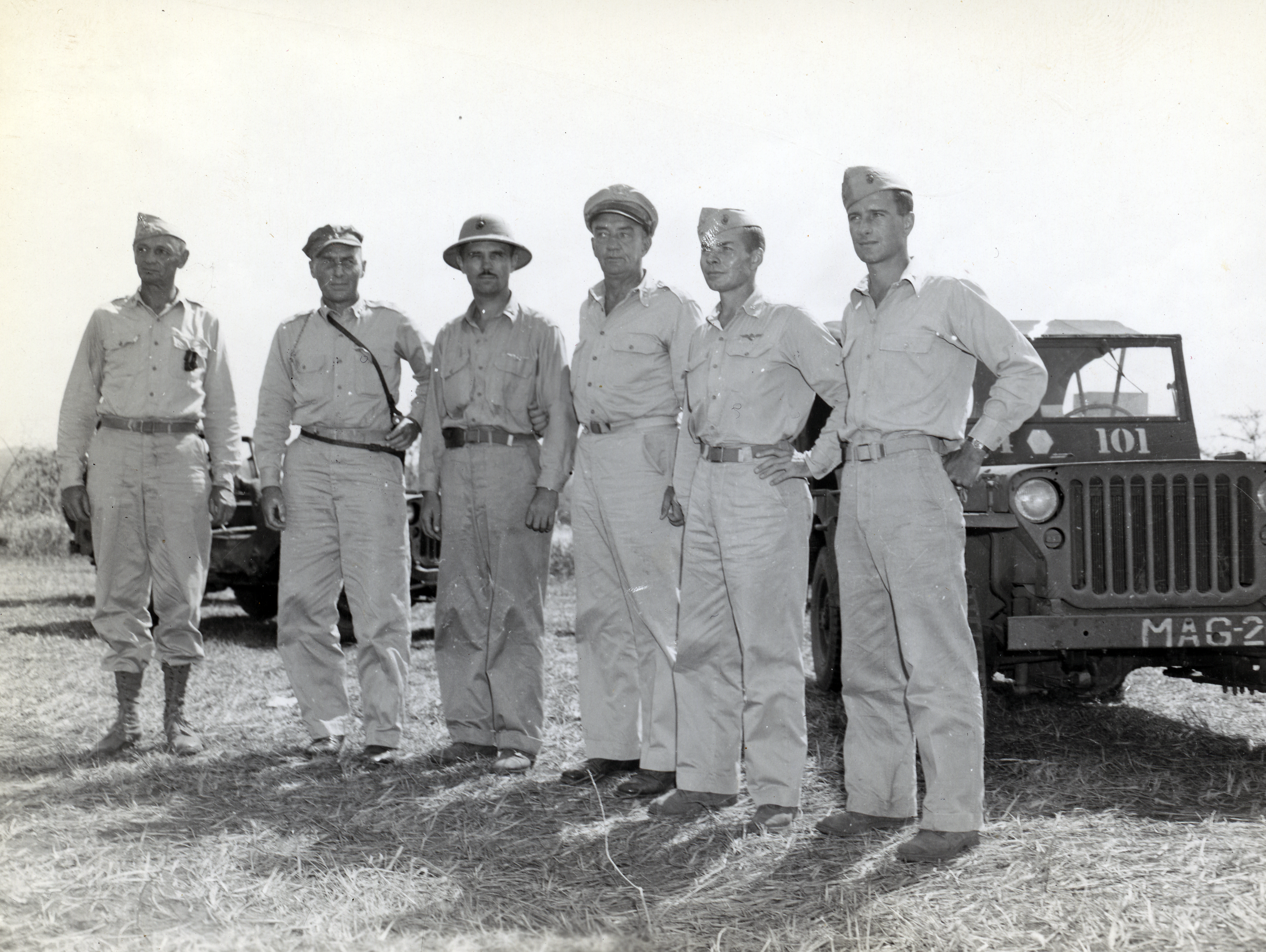
Left to Right: Unidentified, Major General Franklin Sibert Jr., Colonel Lyle H. Meyer (MAG-24 CO), Lt. General Robert L. Eichelberger, Lt. Col Keith B. McCutcheon (MAG-24), Lt. Col John H. Earle, Jr. (XO MAG-24).

Operations in the Luzon would start winding up mid-February 1945 when MAG-32 would move to the Southern Philippines in Mindanao. MAG-24 would follow suit at the beginning of April to join MAG-12, and MAG-32 to form MAGSZAMBOANGA (MAGZAM). During operations with MAGZAM, MAG-24 flew out of Titcomb airfield named after an ALP officer who was killed by sniper fire in the Luzon campaign. LtCol McCutcheon chose the location of Titcomb airfield during a daring reconnaissance during which he coordinated air support for Filipino guerillas and gained intelligence which allowed the ground forces in the area to land unopposed. This action netted McCutcheon the Silver Star. MAG-24 arrived on 17 April 1945 and resumed flight operations on 22 April. The campaign in Mindanao would improve Close Air Support to the point that the "infantry would come to rely on [it] to an extent rarely matched in operations anywhere in the Pacific". One example on 8 May, was the nearest Close Air Support mission yet when aircraft from VMSB-241 and 133 bombed a Japanese line only 200 yards away from friendly forces. The SBDs dropped approximately 5 tons of bombs and the Japanese position "simply disintegrated". Henry Chapin described the Philippine campaign as a "watershed" for Marine aviation. The previously "sketchy doctrine of close air support had been fleshed out, refined, and honed in combat". And for the most part, the Close Air Support became factory like; precise and efficient. In one example, every day, every hour, from 0800-1500 a flight reported to the 24th Division ALP. The Marines of MAGZAM received over 30 accolades from every level of Army command. However, it was the end of an era as the venerable SBD was officially retired in July 1945.

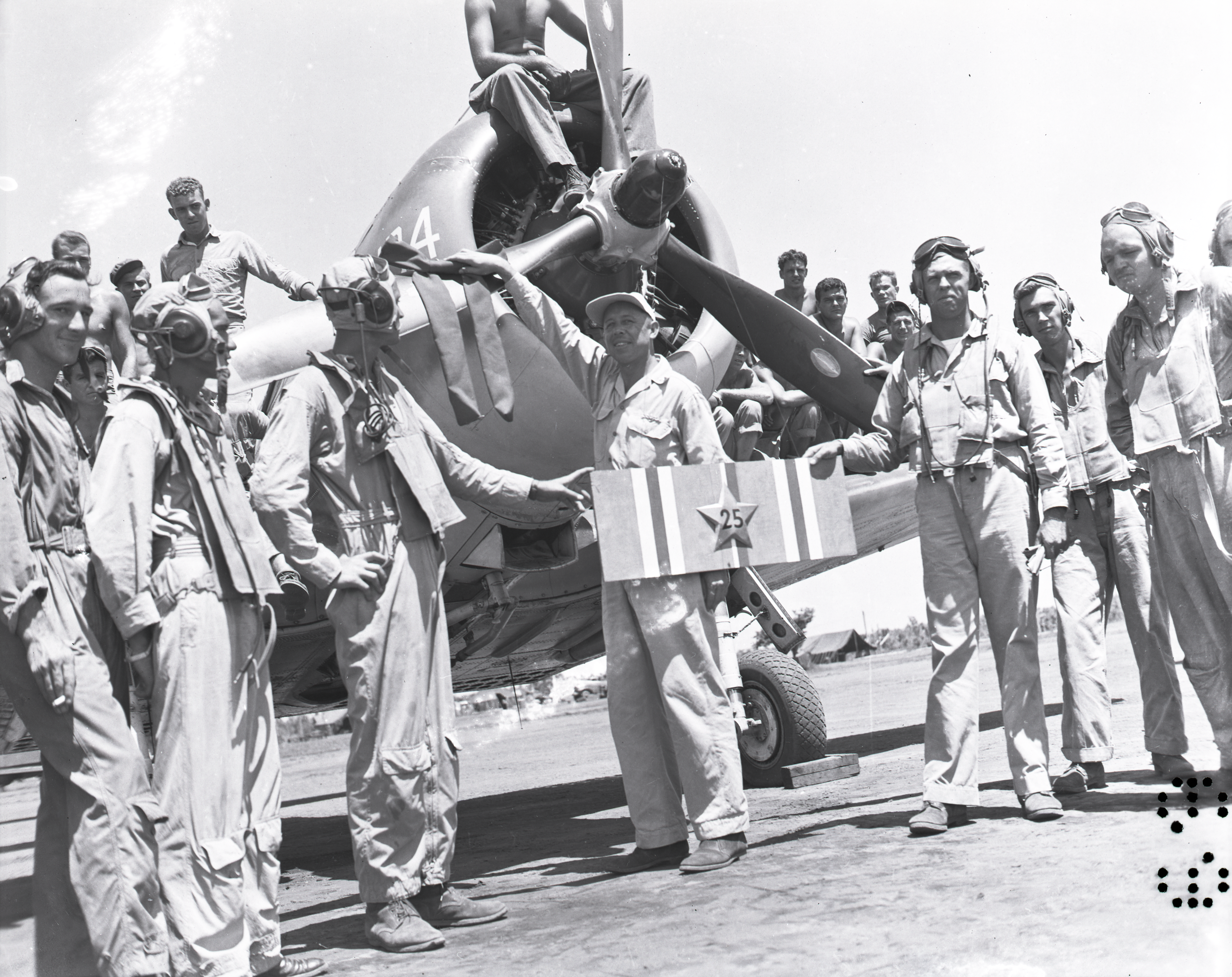
The end of the SBD was marked with ceremonies at Malabang, Mindanao on 28 July by members of Marine Air Group 24 of the First Marine Air Wing. Squadrons of that group were the last Marine units to use the Douglas Dauntless dive bomber in the Philippines campaign. Location: Malabang Philippines.

In May 1945, VMSB-244 would receive the SB2C Curtis Helldiver which was 20 knots faster, carried rockets, and more bombs than the SBDs but in many other ways was inferior to the SBD. After the retiring of the SBDs, VMSB-244 would remain the only active squadron of MAG-24. In September 1945 MAG-24 would move with 1st Marine Aircraft Wing to Beiping, China for occupation duty.

=== Post World War II – Occupation of Beiping China (1945–1947) ===
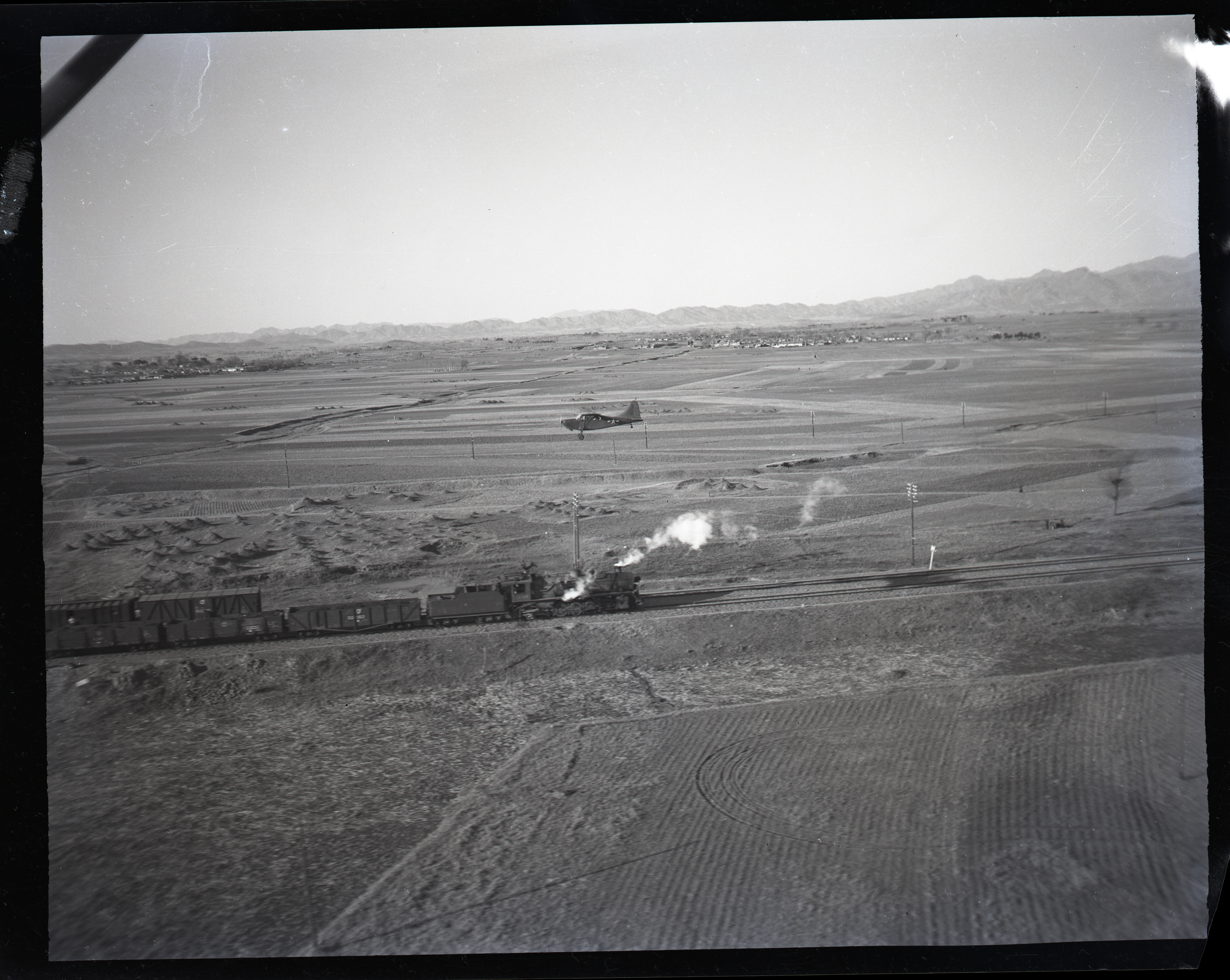
MARINE GRASSHOPPER PLANE of Major General Louis E. Woods First Marine Aircraft Wing flies low over a train carrying vitally needed coal between Tangshan and Tianjin. Planes patrol the tracks for breaks carrying mail and passengers at the same time.

On 22 September 1945, 1st Marine Air Wing (1st MAW) started moving from the Philippines to China via Okinawa along with the 3rd Amphibious Corps (IIIAC). MAG-24 was at Nanyuan Airfield in Beiping, China and had VMF squadrons flying the F4U-4 "Corsair", and F7F Tigercat along with multiple transport and observation aircraft directly attached to the Group such as the C-47 SkyTrain, C-46 Commando, SNB-3 Navigator, and OY-1 Sentinel.

During World War II, China contained three different belligerents: the Nationalist Forces under Chiang Kai-Shek, the Communists under Mao Zedong, and the occupying Japanese and Korean forces. At the end of World War II, there were still over 630,000 Japanese and Korean forces remaining in China. The mission of the Marines in China as stated by the Secretary of the Navy Artemus Gates was "to accomplish the disarmament of the Japanese and to provide for their repatriation up to the point where ... the Chinese Nationalist government troops alone could carry out this mission. Unfortunately for the occupation force, this period would also be a decisive period in a continuing civil war between the Nationalist and Communist forces. The Marines were to abstain from active participation while cooperating with the Nationalist government.

During the fall of 1945, the Marines were subject to increasing ambush, sabotage, and harassment from the Communist forces. Quickly after arriving at Beiping in November, 1st MAW was flying show of force patrols and frequently fired upon from the ground by small arms fire. The typical missions flown by 1st MAW and MAG-24 were reconnaissance, and air cover for the Marine infantry in addition to the show of force patrols. The statuses of the rail lines, in particular, were a common mission objective for the MAGs as they were subject to constant sabotage from the Communist forces.

To reconcile the Communists and Nationalists, President Truman appointed General Marshall as his Special Representative to broker a peace between the two sides. In February 1946, he was able to arrange a cease-fire. However, by mid-March, the tenuous cease-fire was being openly violated, mostly by the Communists, although the pretense of brokering a peace deal would continue until the end of 1946. Additionally, the Communist forces received a significant amount of support from the Soviet Union who were still occupying parts of China. The Marshall brokered cease-fire and aid from the Soviets provided respite for allowing the Communist forces to increase their military position significantly. The Nationalists would follow suit by increasing the strength of their armies in Manchuria. By August 1946, parts of China would be in a state of war.

Concurrently in the spring of 1946, the Marines in China would drawdown due to post-war decreases in end-strength and policies to return deployed personnel back to the U.S. By summer of 1946 most Japanese had been repatriated to their home islands, and the withdrawal of the Marines accelerated. During the summer, this accelerated withdrawal included the deactivation of an entire division and withdrawals of two of the three MAGS in 1st MAW. By July 1946, only the headquarters of 1st MAW, the attached transport and observation squadrons and fighter squadrons of MAG-24 would remain. The only missions left to the Marines were the guarding of strategic coal lines, and bridges and these missions were transferred to the Nationalist Forces as quickly as possible. By the end of 1946, President Truman ordered that the American participation in China ended when it was clear that the Nationalists and Communists would not reach a truce. MAG-24 would receive orders to deploy to Guam on 1 April 1947.

=== Cuban Missile Crisis (October – November 1962) ===
During the fall of 1962 MAG-24 would support the massive mobilization effort that resulted from the Cuban Missile Crisis. During the summer of 1962 the Soviet Premier Nikita Khrushchev significantly yet quietly increased the amount of assistance to the Cuban government. The support included 20,000 troops, 40 nuclear capable intermediate ballistic missiles, and 40 nuclear capable medium bombers the IL-28. The location of the missiles were 15 miles from Guantanamo Bay Naval Base (GTMO) and just 90 miles from the Florida coast. When operational, these arms would radically change the rivalry between the U.S. and U.S.S.R. The Soviet buildup was a response to the U.S. ballistic missile presence in Western Europe and particularly to the ballistic missiles present in Turkey. The U.S first learned of the existence of Soviet ballistic missiles on 14 October 1962 from photographs taken by a U-2 aircraft. Surprisingly President Kennedy was only briefed of the situation on 16 October. President Kennedy and his advisors discussed several early responses to the ballistic missile presence including an invasion, bombing the missile sites, and a naval quarantine (modified blockade).

Concurrent to the President's decision the U.S. Armed Forces went to a war footing with an efficiency unseen since World War II. On 18 October, MAG-24 located in North Carolina started planning for VMF(AW)-531 to deploy to from North Carolina to Key West and ensuring that crews were proficient in the use of both the Sidewinder and Sparrow missiles. Additionally, MAG-24 started preparing VMA-533 for deployment aboard an aircraft carrier. On 20 October, both the MAG-24 and Marine Air Base Squadron 24 (MABS-24) COs departed for GTMO on a leader's reconnaissance. At GTMO, two Battalions were airlifted in on 22 October and a Battalion Landing Team from the Caribbean was at the ready. The same day some 3,000 dependents were evacuated from GTMO within hours. By the end of 22 October, the GTMO forces were increased by 5,000 personnel. In Key West, MABS-24 assumed supply and logistical support for MAG-14 and VMA-533, 20 A-4B aircraft, was transferred from MAG-24 to MAG-14. All in all, over 100,000 lbs of cargo was airlifted from North Carolina to Key West in 24 hours.

President Kennedy addressed the nation on 22 October 1962 in a televised address. He alerted the country to the presence of the ballistic missiles in Cuba and that he had sent a letter to Khrushchev demanding the weapons be dismantled, warning the Soviets of the naval quarantine and the preparation for military force. The Soviets tested the blockade on 24 October and turned away. On 25 October further reconnaissance flights indicate that the ballistic missile sites were becoming operational. On the morning of 26 October Kennedy, anxious, states that only a U.S. attack on Cuba will remove the missiles but insists on giving the diplomatic channels more time. Fortunately, he receives a message from Nikita Khrushchev later on 26 October stating that he will remove the missiles if the U.S. does not invade. Another letter from the Soviets on 27 October demands that the U.S. ballistic missiles are also removed from Turkey. The same day a U-2 was shot down over Cuba, and the 35-year-old Air Force pilot became the only operational casualty during the crisis. On 28 October, President Kennedy accepts Khrushchev's letters promising not to invade Cuba and also to dismantle the ballistic missiles in Turkey (although the dismantling of the ballistic missiles would remain classified for many years). While the acceptance of the terms would bring the crisis to a close, it wouldn't be truly over until the Soviets removed their IL-28 bombers from Cuba on 20 November.

While the Cuban missile crisis was unique in that it played out primarily between the President and Premier the mobilization of the U.S. Armed Forces to meet the threat was notable. By the time the U.S. and Soviets came to terms on 28 October all of 2nd Marine Division deployed with 40 ships. At Key West MAG-26, and MAG-32 (-) had joined M=Shortly after 28 October the 5th Marine Expeditionary Brigade was moved east with 18,000 Marines, 20 Ships, and included HMM-361, VMA-121, and VMGR-352. Overall, 400,000 American troops were mobilized to the meet the threat. Forty thousand of those troops were Marines and mobilized in only eight days. The current Commandant of the Marine Corps General David M. Shoup stated: "I couldn't be happier about our readiness in this crisis. This time we not only have been ready, we’ve been steady."

=== Operation Desert Shield (August 1990 – January 1991) ===
On 2 August 1990, the Iraqi Army invaded Kuwait capturing both the oil fields and capital due to territory disputes, alleged OPEC quota violations, and the significant debt that Iraq owed Kuwait. The international and U.S. condemnation of the invasion was quick. On 5 August 1990, then President Bush called the attack "naked aggression", and that "this shall not stand". By the 6th, Saudi Arabia had given the U.S. permission to deploy military forces in their country and The Pentagon began what would become Operation Desert Shield within hours.

The 3rd Marine Aircraft Wing (3rd MAW) became the Aviation Combat Element that supported the 1st Marine Expeditionary Force (1st MEF) and based on OpPlan 1002-90 which envisioned a regional conflict and used initially for deployment and movement to the Persian Gulf. The threat presented by Saddam Hussein's Iraqi army dictated a potent fixed wing mix, followed by the anti-armor capability brought by the AH-1W Cobra. The first 3rd MAW proposal for fixed-wing forces included four F/A-18 Hornet squadrons, two AV-8B Harrier squadrons, two A-6E Intruder squadrons, and all of the Marine EA-6B Prowlers. By the start of hostilities, the total fixed wing aircraft in theater would nearly double that number and include the venerable OV-10 Bronco. The desire to keep unit integrity of aircraft and personnel was met with a harsh reality of previous operational commitments, squadrons transitioning and retiring aircraft (F/A-18A to F/A-18C), and G-limited aircraft (A-6E Intruder). The assortment of aircraft issues, including the typical pre-deployment personnel issues, resulted in the wholesale swap of aircraft and personnel to deploy the best mix of aircraft to Saudi Arabia. To meet the desired anti-armor capability HMLA squadrons were mixed to be Cobra heavy using a blend of 18 Cobras and six Hueys instead of the usual half and half mix. The swap of aircraft and personnel caused friction as the deployed forces started to have disparities in readiness and training between those squadrons that arrived first and those that came last.

The assault support requirement was more modest for Desert Storm starting with three HMM squadrons flying the CH-46E, and three HMH squadrons flying a mix of CH-53Ds and CH-53Es. This too would nearly double once the build-up was complete to six HMM squadrons, and nearly five HMH squadrons including detachments. The CH-46E was showing its age in 1990; a transmission failure had reduced the maximum gross weight of the aircraft from 24,300 lbs to 22,000 lbs. The CH-46E was further constrained by the high pressure and density altitudes in the Persian Gulf region resulting in a standard combat load of eight personnel in each aircraft. The HMH squadrons became the desired choice to fulfill large troop movements. The assault support squadrons also had similar aircraft and personnel constraints, when compared to the fixed wing units, resulting in large scale swaps to quickly deploy aircraft.

MAG-24, tapped on 12 August on to deploy as part of the 7th MEB was removed as a headquarters unit but would send all of its Hornet squadrons, and most of its rotary-wing squadrons forward. VMFA-235 the "Death Angels", had deployed to Nevada for Exercise Red Flag in July was ordered on 9 August to join 3rd MAW for deployment, and self-deployed to the Persian Gulf arriving on 22 August. The remaining MAG-24 F/A-18C squadrons also ordered to deploy arrived in the Persian Gulf on 19 December. VMFA-212 anticipating being assigned to the Gulf deployed first to MCAS Yuma to conduct all the pre-deployment training it could. MAG-24 also sent eight CH-53Ds from HMH-463 and 12 CH-46Es from HMM-165 which arrived via strategic air in the first week of September 1990. HMM-265 would also be assigned to deploy with the 5th MEB which would arrive after the transition from Desert Shield to Desert Storm.

Once in Saudi Arabia, the Marine Air assets balanced required logistical mission sets and the final tasks to become combat ready. The Hornet squadrons had the added responsibility of standing Combat Air Patrol (CAP) to block any further Iraqi aggression. From deployment through mid-January when Desert Storm kicked off fixed wing assets concentrated on Night Vision Goggle operations, aerial gunnery, mass air strikes, and Air Tasking Order (ATO) rehearsals. Of particular importance to the deployed Hornet squadrons was the employment of HARM anti-radar missile which they would be employing for the first time. The assault support helicopters balanced the constant churn of logistics missions, range sweeps, and VIP flight along with their final preparations for combat. When not flying in general support of 3rd MAW the assault support helicopters concentrated on increasingly complex heliborne assault rehearsals. The final rehearsal, executed on 7 January 1991, launched two dozen CH-53s and CH-46s, eight AH-1Ws, a section of AV-8Bs and OV-10s, and finally two UH-1Ns for command and control. Operation Desert Shield would shift to Operation Desert Storm on 15 January.

=== Operation Desert Storm (January - February 1991) ===
Early in Desert Shield, by late October 1991, President Bush and his administration decided that economic sanctions would lead to "long-term stalemate", and that a ground campaign would be necessary to force Saddam Hussein out of Kuwait While President Bush would wait for the mid-term elections on 7 November to finish, the Secretary of Defense and Chairman of the Joint Chiefs of Staff were cleared to prepare the necessary build-up. The 3rd Marine Aircraft Wing participated in the four discrete phases of the Strategic Air Campaign. Phase I planned to gain and maintain air superiority, and destroy strategic Iraqi Command And Control (C2), chemical and biological delivery systems, and Iraqi supply and industrial bases. Phase II moved the air campaign to destroy similar systems as Phase I but specifically those Iraqi assets displaced into Kuwait. Phase III concentrated on battlefield preparation against the specific Iraqi forces that would oppose the ground campaign. Finally, Phase IV was the close air support necessary to support the ground scheme of maneuver to liberate Kuwait. Combat began on 17 January 1991 when in the early morning forty-six fixed wing Marine aircraft joined a plethora of coalition aircraft to destroy critical Iraqi command and control facilities.

F/A-18s primarily flew the first Marine missions of Desert Storm because the aircraft could fly in the sanctuary above the Integrated Air Defense (IAD) threat and carried flares to protect against surface-to-air threats during bombing runs. The first missions were complex, precisely timed, had little to no external communications and were mostly at night utilizing aerial refueling. Additionally, the Hornets launched 100 AGM-88 HARM anti-radiation missiles the first day, nearly half of the total expended during the entire conflict. Eventually, AV-8B Harriers and AH-1W/J Cobras which didn't have the necessary countermeasures for the IAD threat flew in support of the Air Tasking Order. The Harriers and Cobras were used to destroy Iraqi forces shelling and attempting to occupy the town of Khafji, a Saudi Arabian city near the Kuwait border. For action at Khafji, the AH-1Ws received a Distinguished Flying Cross for a nights work destroying observational posts and anti-aircraft sites while under intense fire. During this time the assault support helicopters were kept busy with an aerial resupply of ordnance in preparation of the ground campaign. Furthermore, on 23 January the CH-53s, the first of several artillery raids took place using 17 aircraft. Similar missions and attacks would continue until "G-Day", (24 February 1990) the designated day to commence the ground campaign.

The first use of Marine aviation during the ground campaign was UH-1N Hueys, for C2 at the breach sites into Kuwait. The Marines pouring into the breach sites were attacked with Iraqi artillery and used counter battery radars to guide Harrier and friendly artillery fire to destroy 42 enemy artillery sites. Meanwhile, the Hornet squadrons were showing up on station using a "push CAS", system. The system assigned aircraft to "fast FAC", an F/A-18D two seated Hornet for control. Fast FAC would assign fixed wing assets to those units needing immediate CAS support, or to other known and suspected targets. Additionally, 3rd MAW added another F/A-18D for battlefield over-watch of positions, weather, and enemy concentrations of ground forces. As with all campaigns the "fog of war", settled. Noted friction points were Battle Damage Assessment, navigation in the early days of GPS (LORAN-C was the navigation system of choice), the always unknown of weather, and finally the Air Tasking Order (ATO). The ATO which disseminated via courier and Xerox machines would often not show up in time for proper planning at the squadron level.

Most facets of Operation Desert Storm were a resounding success the failed large scale heliborne lift of Task Force X-Ray was a notable exception and of particular interest to a Rotary Wing MAG. Task Force X-Ray was to provide a blocking force and protect the flank of Task Force Papa Bear between the first and second obstacle belts just over Kuwait Border. X-Ray consisted of three Combined Anti-Armor Teams (CAAT) and a headquarters section consisting of 134 Marines and 40 vehicles (primarily M-151 Jeeps and Toyota pickups). The heliborne package consisted of 12 × AH-1W/Js, 6 × UH-1N, 20 × CH-46Es, and 13 × CH-53E/Ds. The Air Mission Commander was the Commanding Officer of HMM-165 (MAG-24). The mission was an event-driven, emissions controlled (EMCON), day mission on 24 February 1991. One of the specific criteria for the mission was that it launch in the daytime to avoid a night insert that crews were neither equipped nor qualified to carry out (one flight of CH-53Ds had no Night Vision Goggles at all). Despite the briefed daytime launch requirement, the mission launched at night due to delays and miscommunication with the ground forces. Once in the Objective Area, there was extreme confusion in communications as to the enemy presence in the Landing Zone, including an incident in which the Cobras were co-altitude as the Assault Support aircraft. Due to the fiasco in the Objective Area, the C2 aircraft called a mission abort. The abort resulted in another cascade of near mid-air collisions because of inadequate planning. Noted Operation Desert Storm historian LtCol Leroy Stearns stated that the Marines were "lucky on that night not to have lost a Marine". The failed lift did result in the roll-over of a CH-46E on takeoff from the Pick-up Zone, and a hard landing of a CH-53D on return to base. Factors that led to the failure were lack of oversight from higher headquarters, failure to complete a mission rehearsal, and the failure to adhere to the launch criteria.

The ground campaign lasted a short four days from 24 to 28 February 1991. The culminating event for the Marine Corps was the capture of Kuwait International Airport early on the morning of the 27th by Task Force Shepherd. During the entire ground campaign, all 3rd MAW fixed-wing aircraft flew at surge rates in what amounted to four Hornets and four Harriers launching every 30 minutes. 3rd MAWs rotary wing aircraft remained equally as busy, and the helicopters crews spent far more time in the vicinity of the enemy than the fixed wing pilots. During the entire ground campaign, Marines found well stocked and un-damaged Iraqi units well entrenched, camouflaged and untouched by the three-week air campaign. Most Iraqi units surrendered after a token amount of resistance – they simply had no desire to die fighting over another country.

=== MAG-24 Re-Designation as Aviation Support Element Kaneohe (30 September 1994 – 15 February 2002) ===
Due to the planned reduction of the Marine Corps after the Cold War, also known as Base Re-Alignment and Closure (BRAC), MAG-24 was re-designated as Aviation Support Element Kaneohe (ASEK) on 30 September 1994. The re-designation of MAG-24 was completed in conjunction with the deactivation of the 1st MEB Command Element, and re-designation of the 1st Brigade Service Support Group to the 3rd Combat Service Support Group. The reduction was the result of a plan started in 1990 by the Secretary of Defense Dick Cheney to reduce military spending by 12% and the armed forces by 25% by 1996. At the height of the cold war, the Marine Corps had a force of 199,525 Marines, this decreased slightly to 194,040 during Desert Shield/Desert Storm and rapidly declined to 174,158 by 1994 to its lowest point since 1960 of 172,641 in 1999. The reduction was in large part due to the Soviet push towards peaceful reform and the inability of the Soviet forces to mount any challenge to U.S. interests. In the summer of 1994, MAG-24 transferred all three of its F/A-18 "Hornet", squadrons (VMFA-212, 232, and 235) to MAG-11 located at MCAS El Toro. Both of the remaining MAG-24 CH-46E squadrons were in the process of being transferred. HMM-265 was transferred to MAG-36 in Okinawa, Japan by the end of 1994 and HMM-165 was transferred to MAG-16 in California in May 1996. MWSS-174 deactivated on 8 Sep 1994. Leading up to the MAG-24 re-designation ceremony HMH-463 "Pegasus", was the single CH-53D squadron attached to MAG-24. During the ceremony, HMH-463 transferred half of its helicopters to form HMH-366 the "Hammerheads". Additionally, MALS-24 was re-organized as the Marine Air Logistics Element Kaneohe (MALSEK). The deactivation of 1st MEB and subsequent reorganization (including the re-designation of MAG-24) was "necessary for the Marine Corps to meet its global requirements in the face of a reduced force structure in the post-cold war era, " according to Commanding General of 1st MEB, R.F. Vercauteren.

By 1996, the Aviation Support Element Kaneohe consisted of five squadrons and all 40 of the CH-53Ds in the Marine Corps inventory. Those squadrons were: HMH-463 "Pegasus", HMH-366 "Hammerheads", HMH-362 "Ugly Angels", HMH-363 "Lucky Red Lions", and the training squadron HMT-301 "Wind Walkers". The ASEK continued to be a force in readiness in the Pacific supporting exercises and eventually beginning the Unit Deployment Program in Okinawa. Beginning in September 2001, the Commanding General of 1st Marine Aircraft Wing (then MajGen Cartwright) started the process to return the ASEK to MAG-24(-). The justification for the return of MAG-24 was that the goals of the drawdown/BRAC in Hawaii were never fully realized, that the ASEK and its tenant units had been operating in both training and employment as a MAG, and finally that the change was necessary to prepare for the transition of the CH-53D to the MV-22. The request was favorably endorsed as it was, in effect, a name change only. The redesignation included no change to the ASEK mission statement (which hadn't changed in the transition from MAG to ASEK). Furthermore, there was no increase in manpower, the addition of any of the other squadrons to form an Aviation Combat Element, enablers such as an MWSS, or even an S-2 department in the MAG headquarters. The approval was so quick that the ASEK had no time to order a MAG(-) flag in time for the designation ceremony. Instead, the commander of troops and future Executive Officer then LtCol Mark Dungan, broke out the old MAG-24 flag (with no minus) which had been on display in the ASEK commander’s office. The ceremony was held on 15 February 2002, between Hangars 101 and 102 on Marine Corps Base Hawaii flight line.

=== Operation Iraqi Freedom (Dec 2004 - May 2009) ===
On 9 April 2003 the decisive fighting in the invasion of Iraq and Baghdad finished and ended Saddam Hussein's twenty-four-year reign. The campaign, which lasted just over 30 days, was just the beginning of MAG-24 involvement in Operation Iraqi Freedom (OIF). Throughout the summer of 2003, violence in Iraq increased, especially in the Sunni populated areas. As violence escalated, combined airpower was reinstated in the fall for the first time since the end of decisive fighting to combat the growing insurgency. The early part of 2004 started with a temporary calm in violence but exploded, leading to the first and second battles of Fallujah in April and November, respectively. The fighting in Fallujah was the most intense urban combat since the battle of Hue City in Vietnam nearly a half-century before. The increased activity brought with it a need for more personnel. MAG-24 sent over 10 individual augments during the latter half of 2004. In December 2004, HMH-363, the "Lucky Red Lions", sent a detachment of CH-53Ds to the 31st MEU. The 31st MEU was quickly sent to the middle east to finish combat training in Kuwait before supporting OIF. While in support of OIF, HMH-363 participated in desert flight operations, tactical missions, and raids while battling the constant sandstorms. Of note, HMH-363 also assisted in the recovery of remains and aircraft in January 2005 when a CH-53E crashed in western Iraq, killing 30 Marines and a single sailor. Up to that date, it was the single deadliest event of OIF. The detachment from HMH-363 returned to Hawaii in May 2005.

It wasn't until March 2006 that MAG-24 had a constant presence of CH-53Ds supporting OIF. Starting preparation in the fall of 2005, HMH-463 trained in desert operations following the fall Weapons and Tactics Instructor course. By 22 March 2005, HMH-463 "Pegasus" was deployed to Al Asad Airbase in the Anbar province of Iraq with eight aircraft and 170 Marines. Most of the CH-53D mission in Iraq was general support of the Marines in the Area of Operations. Generally, daytimes missions were flown west of Al Asad to Forward Operating Bases such as Korean Village, Waleed, Trebil, Haditha Dam, Al Qa'im, Camp Rawah, and Bayji. nighttime missions were sent east of Al Asad to Al Ramadi, Baharia, Blue Diamond, Hurricane Point, Habanniyah, Camp Fallujah, Al Taqaddum, and Balad. The Lucky Red Lions also participated in several raids in support of II MEF and the Multinational Coalition forces. Unfortunately, in September, a night raid resulted in a hard landing and the aircraft remaining in the objective. When the HMH-363 investigation and tactical recovery force was inserted, it was attacked and defended itself from the insurgency. On 7 October 2006, HMH-463 "Pegasus" conducted a Relief in Place (RIP) and Transfer of Authority (TOA) taking over for the "Lucky Red Lions".

The mission for HMH-463 remained the same as that for the HMH-363. During this time, II MEF concentrated on securing Al Ramadi from the insurgency, and Abu Masab al-Zarqawi was killed in an airstrike. Early in 2007 was also the period in which the civilian shooting of Haditha gained national media attention. HMH-362 the "Ugly Angels", relieved "Pegasus", on 14 April 2007, after a relatively quiet deployment The "Ugly Angels" started quickly conducting a night raid in April, which was the first since the "Pegasus", mishap raid in the fall. Flying the same GS missions as HMH-363, HMH-362 also participated in several Aero Scout missions. The Aero Scout is a mission where suspicious vehicles or gatherings are investigated by inserting an already heliborne force to secure and question possible insurgents. On 21 October 2007, HMH-362 was relieved by VMM-263 in what was the first operational deployment of the MV-22 "Osprey".

MAG-24 had one more gap in OIF support until HMH-363 was slated to return to the Al Anbar province in September 2008. Real-world events conspired against the "Lucky Red Lions", and the squadron deployed nearly 100 days early. HMH-362 relieved HMH-363 in February 2008 and remained in Iraq until being transferred to Afghanistan and Operation Enduring Freedom in the late spring of 2008.

=== Operation Enduring Freedom (2009-2012) ===
Operation Enduring Freedom (OEF) began on 7 October 2001. Seven years later, the beginnings of MAG-24 involvement started in March 2008 when the 24th Marine Expeditionary Unit (MEU) deployed to the Helmand Province along with 2nd Battalion, 7th Marines (2/7). On 29 April, Marines from 1st Battalion, 6th Marines, the Battalion Landing Team (BLT) from the 24th MEU stormed into the Garmsir District, located in the heart of the Helmand. This was the first U.S. operation in the area in years and re-started what would become a Marine Expeditionary Force (MEF) campaign in the Helmand. Throughout the spring and fall, the BLT 1/6 and 2/7 would continue offensive operations until they rotated out in the fall of 2008.

In February 2009, Secretary of Defense Robert Gates continued building momentum in the Helmand by ordering 8,000 Marines of the 2nd Marine Expeditionary Brigade (MEB) to deploy. HMH-362 "The Ugly Angels", which had been stationed at Al Asad Air Base as part of Operation Iraqi Freedom (OIF), was ordered to attach to MAG-40 the ACE for the 2nd MEB. Starting on 17 April, HMH-362 moved from Al Asad to Kandahar Air Base. To prepare for the massive influx of aircraft Marine Wing Support Squadron 371 and Naval Mobile Construction Battalion 5 began expanding the small airfield at Camp Bastion with AM-2 matting. Throughout May, the ramp space at the field was increased by 2.2 million square feet, which was the largest ever in a combat zone. Once the ramp was completed, HMH-362 moved along with HMH-772 from Kandahar to Camp Bastion.

Operation Khanjar, the first major operation for 2nd MEB, kicked off on 2 July 2009. Khanjar was an effort to secure the population from insurgents and foreign fighters ahead of local elections. During the operation, 4,000 Marines; and 650 Afghan National Police and Army were inserted into the area just south of the Marjah and Garmsir districts. MAG-40 and the 82nd Combat Air Brigade inserted more than 2,000 of the 4,000 by helicopter, making the operation the most massive heliborne movement since Vietnam. During the air movement, HMH-362 was the Air Mission Commander. For the rest of July and August, MAG-40 supported the resupply of forces conducting Operation Khanjar along with aerial resupply. In August, HMH-362 was relieved by HMH-463 "Pegasus".

HMH-463 continued the campaign of disrupting insurgent intimidation and violence ahead of the elections participating in Operation Eastern Resolve II located at Nowzad, an insurgent hotbed located north of Camp Bastion. The buildup in the Helmand increased when, in December 2009, then-President Obama announced the "surge", a plan to send 30,000 troops to Afghanistan for up to 18 months. Immediately after that announcement, the MEB made plans to expand to a full MEF of 19,400 personnel. Towards the end of HMH-463s rotation, on 13 February 2010, Pegasus participated in Operation Moshtarak, which was the largest joint operation in Afghanistan to that point occurring in Marjah and Nawa.

In March 2010, HMH-363 "the Lucky Red Lions", relieved Pegasus and concentrated on General Support in support of the MEF battling the small lift capacity caused by the high summer temperatures and relatively high altitude found throughout the Helmand. During September, HMH-362 returned to Camp Bastion for the second time to relieve HMH-363. Additionally, in September 3rd Battalion 7th Marines (3/7) replaced the British in the Sangin area northeast of Camp Bastion. The following January 2011, 1,400 Marines expanded into the "fishhook", region well south of the Garmsir district. Both of these movements represented expansion into the previously held insurgent territory as the fighting in the central Helmand and the Garmsir district essentially ended with Operation Godfather on 14 January 2011.

HMH-463 relieved HMH-362 on 10 March 2011, making it Pegasus' second rotation through the Helmand. Operations within the Helmand continued regularly with continued pressure in the "Fishhook", near Khan Neshin castle and minor skirmishes in Nowzad. Following the death of Osama Bin Laden, on 22 June 2011, then president Obama announced the planned withdrawal of 33,000 troops from Afghanistan by the summer of 2012. Pegasus deployment passed more or less without fanfare as Marines continued operations in the "Fishook". The Lucky Red Lions of HMH-363 relieved Pegasus on 17 September 2011. Unfortunately, on 19 January 2012, HMH-363 lost six Marines in a helicopter crash resulting from a catastrophic rotor blade failure. During the early part of 2012, 2nd Battalion, 4th Marines pushed out from Sangin to clear Musa Qala while 3rd Battalion 7th Marines continued to work the Sangin area. HMH-362 arrived for their third rotation at Camp Leatherneck on 2 March 2012. The Ugly Angels of HMH-362 continued providing general support in the Area of Operations and direct support of the Battalions throughout the Helmand. On 11 September 2012, the Ugly Angels departed the Helmand Valley and Afghanistan. All of the HMH-362 CH-53Ds were transported to Davis-Monthan Air Force Base and decommissioned. HMH-362 was deactivated as an HMH squadron on 30 November 2012.

=== MAG-24 Commanding Officers ===
Maj Ira L. Kimes	1 Mar 1942 – 11 Apr 1942	Col Robert L. LaMar	5 Jul 1966 – 14 Apr 1967
Capt John K. Little	12 Apr 1942 – 30 Apr 1942	Col Leo R. Jillisky	15 Apr 1967 – 1 Aug 1967
Maj Lewis H. Delano	1 May 1942 – 2 Jun 1942	Col John L. Herndon	2 Aug 1967 – 31 Mar 1968
LtCol Franklin G. Cowie	3 Jun 1942 – 16 Jul 1942	Col William C. McGraw	1 Apr 1968 – 31 Oct 1968
LtCol William L. McKittrick	17 Jul 1942 – 19 Feb 1944	Col Alexander Wilson	1 Nov 1968 – 17 Oct 1969
LtCol Lewis H. Delano	20 Feb 1944 – 10 Aug 1944	Col Kenny C. Palmer	18 Oct 1969 – 9 Feb 1971
Col Lyle H. Meyer	11 Aug 1944 – 30 May 1945	Col Richard E. Carey	10 Feb 1971 – 5 May 1972
Col Warren E. Sweetser Jr.	1 Jun 1945 – 9 Aug 1945	Col William G. Crocker	6 May 1972 – 16 Jul 1973
Col Edward A. Montgomery	10 Aug 1945 – 28 Jan 1946	Col Ralph Thuesen	17 Jul 1973 – 6 Feb 1974
Col Edward L. Pugh	29 Jan 1946 – 5 Apr 1946	Col Joseph J. Went	7 Feb 1974 – 5 Apr 1976
Col Marion L. Dawson	6 Apr 1946 – 5 May 1947	Col John L. Thatcher	6 Apr 1976 – 21 Jul 1977
LtCol Edwin P. Pennebaker	6 May 1947 – 6 Jul 1947	Col Stanley A. Challgren	22 Jul 1977 – 28 Jun 1979
Col William A. Willis	7 Jul 1947 – 30 Sep 1947	Col Warren A. Ferdinand	29 Jun 1979 – 28 May 1981
BGen William L. McKittrick	1 Oct 1947 – 12 Apr 1949	LtCol Richard T. Ward	29 May 1981 – 2 Jul 1981
Col Perry K. Smith	13 Apr 1949 – 24 Jul 1949	Col John M. Solan	3 Jul 1981 – 28 Feb 1983
LtCol Stewart B. ONeille Jr	25 Jul 1949 – 5 Aug 1949	Col Duane A. Wills	1Mar 1983 – 6 Jul 1984
Col John W. Sapp	6 Aug 1949 – 7 Dec 1949	Col Jefferson D. Howell	7 Jul 1984 – 22 Jul 1986
Col Joslyn R. Bailey	8 Dec 1949 – 9 Oct 1950	Col William R. Gage	23 Jul 1986 – 10 Jun 1988
Col Perry O. Parmelee	10 Oct 1950 – 30 Jun 1951	Col Gary L. Elsten	11 Jun 1988 – 3 Aug 1990
Col Joseph H. Renner	1 Jul 1951 – 30 Jun 1952	Col Terry M. Curtis	4 Aug 1990 – 6 Feb 1992
Col Edward W. Johnston	1 Jul 1952 – 16 Feb 1953	Col Michael A. Hough	7 Feb 1992 – 8 Jul 1993
Col William A. Millington	17 Feb 1953 – 10 Jun 1954	Col Michael H. Boyce	10 Jun 1995 – 31 Jul 1996
Col William F. Hausman	11 Jun 1954 – 10 Jul 1955	LtCol Richard Burchnall	1 Aug 1996 – 2 Aug 1996
Col Lawrence H. McCulley	11 Jul 1955 – 7 Jun 1956	Col Mark J. Brousseau	3 Aug 1996 – 24 Jul 1998
Col Neil R. MacIntyre	8 Jun 1956 – 30 May 1957	Col Terrence M. Gordon	25 Jul 1998 – 27 Jul 2000
Col Richard E. Figley	31 May 1957 – 15 Jul 1958	Col William R. Murray	28 Jul 2000 – 26 Jul 2002
Col Homer G. Hutchinson	16 Jul 1958 – 7 Aug 1959	Col Gregory C. Reuss	26 Jul 2002 – 25 Jun 2004
Col Arthur C. Lowell	8 Aug 1959 – 3 Jun 1960	Col Michael E. Love	25 Jun 2004 – 28 Jun 2006
Col Donald H. Strapp	4 Jun 1960 – 17 Jul 1961	Col Edward Yarnell	28 Jun 2006 – 110 Dec 2007
Col Andrew G. Smith	18 Jul 1961 – 31 Mar 1962	Col Joaquin F. Malavet	11 Dec 2007 – 4 Jun 2010
Col James A. Feeley	1 Apr 1962 – 30 Jul 1963	Col Richard L. Caputo	4 Jun 2010 – 28 Jun 2012
Col Stodda Cortelyou	31 Jul 1963 – 6 Dec 1963	Col Paul A. Fortunato	28 Jun 2012 – 12 Jun 2014
Col James E. Johnson	7 Dec 1963 – 17 May 1964	Col Michael E. Watkins	13 Jun 2014 – 29 Jun 2016
Col Robert Steinkraus	18 May 1964 – 16 Jan 1965	Col Christopher Patton	30 Jun 2016 – 29 Jun 2018
Col Howard J. Finn	17 Jan 1965 – 4 Jul 1966		

=== MAG-24 Sergeants Major (Incomplete*) ===
SgtMaj R. McAllister	1 Jul 85 – 28 Jul 86
SgtMaj Hank Laughlin	29 Jul 86 – 5 Oct 86
SgtMaj Elliott L. Harvey	6 Oct 86 – 23 Oct 87
SgtMaj John H. Manor	24 Oct 87 – 21 Feb 90
SgtMaj John M. Gaukler	22 Feb 90 – 24 May 91
SgtMaj Lebaron Chatman	25 May 91 – 31 Aug 92
SgtMaj Francisco Deleon	1 Sep 92 – 30 Jul 94
SgtMaj R.M. Massingill	31 Jul 94 – 28 Jun 96
SgtMaj Royce G Coffee	29 Jun 96 – 1 May 97
SgtMaj Donald Micks	2 May 97 – 30 Jul 00
SgtMaj D.J. Huffmaster	31 Jul 00 – 27 Jun 03
SgtMaj Emanuel Magos	28 Jun 03 – 9 Dec 05
SgtMaj Juan G. Camacho	10 Dec 05 – 6 Jun 08
SgtMaj Eric J. Seward	7 Jun 08 – 3 Jun 10
SgtMaj Tamara L. Fode	4 Jun 10 – 12 Aug 10
SgtMaj Christopher G. Robinson	13 Aug 10 – 30 Aug 12
SgtMaj Ronald Halcovich	31 Aug 12 – 14 Feb 14
SgtMaj Steven E. Collier	15 Feb 14 – 28 Oct 16
SgtMaj Sean P. Cox	29 Oct 16 – 16 Mar 18

*The position of Sergeant Major was not routinely recorded in the Command Chronology until the mid-1980s and 1985 was the first time a Sergeant Major was included in the staff list.

== See also ==
- United States Marine Corps Aviation
- List of United States Marine Corps aircraft groups
- List of United States Marine Corps aircraft squadrons
