= VMSB-244 =

Marine Scout Bombing Squadron 244
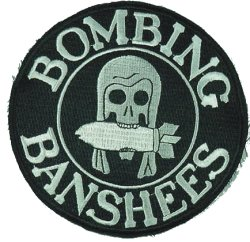
- VMSB-244 insignia
- Active: 1 March 1942 – 10 June 1946
- Country: United States
- Branch: USMC
- Type: Dive Bomber squadron
- Role: Reconnaissance; Air Interdiction; Close air support
- Part of: Inactive
- Nickname: Bombing Banshees
- Engagements: World War II * Bougainville campaign (1943-45) * Philippines campaign (1944–45)

Aircraft flown
- Bomber: Douglas SBD Dauntless; Curtiss SB2C Helldiver

Marine Scout Bombing Squadron 244 (VMSB-244) was a dive bomber squadron in the United States Marine Corps. The squadron, also known as the "Bombing Banshees", fought in World War II in the Pacific Theater as part of the 1st Marine Aircraft Wing. They were deactivated shortly after the end of the war.

== History ==
Marine Scout Bombing Squadron 244 was organized and commissioned as VMSB-242 at Midway Atoll on 1 March 1942. While at Midway they were responsible for defensive patrolling, escort missions, and tactical flight training. They remained on Midway until 11 April 1942 when they sailed aboard the USS William Ward Burrows (AP-6) headed for Hawaii. They remained at Naval Air Station Barbers Point, Oahu until 20 April when the entire squadron again set sail this time for the west coast of the United States.

The squadron arrived at Marine Corps Air Station Santa Barbara, California on 14 June 1942 and became part of Marine Aircraft Group 24. On 14 September 1942 the squadron was redesignated as VMSB-244. In October of that year they changed out their Douglas SBD Dauntless dive bombers for the new Curtiss SB2C-4 Helldiver. Incorrect. VMSB-244 kept the SBD Dauntlesses until late 1944. In late 1943 they were on Bougainville and moved to Green (Nissan) in the summer of 1944. My father was in VMSB-244 from September 1942 until December 1944.

During the early part of January 1943, the squadron was assigned to overseas duty and left San Diego on 7 January 1943 for Midway Atoll. After staging through Marine Corps Air Station Ewa, Hawaii for a little more than a month VMSB-244 disembarked at Midway on 20 March 1943 where they maintained the same duties as a year earlier. On 18 August 1943 the squadron departed Midway for the Hawaiian Islands where it was then split; both echelons arrived in Espiritu Santo in October where a brief training program and simulated attacks against shipping and airfields soon make them ready for combat. During this training period the squadron insignia and appropriate nickname, the "Bombing Banshees" was originated. Banshee was the USAAF's name for the SBD Dauntless and the title of an ancient Scottish and Irish spirit whose wailing foretold the coming of terror, death and destruction.

In May 1945, as the campaign on Mindanao wound down, the squadron replaced its Douglas SBD Dauntless aircraft with the Curtiss SB2C Helldiver and shortly thereafter VMSB-244 became the only squadron of MAG-24 to remain active.

== See also ==
- United States Marine Corps Aviation
- List of active United States Marine Corps aircraft squadrons
- List of decommissioned United States Marine Corps aircraft squadrons
