= Marine Wing Support Squadron 174 =

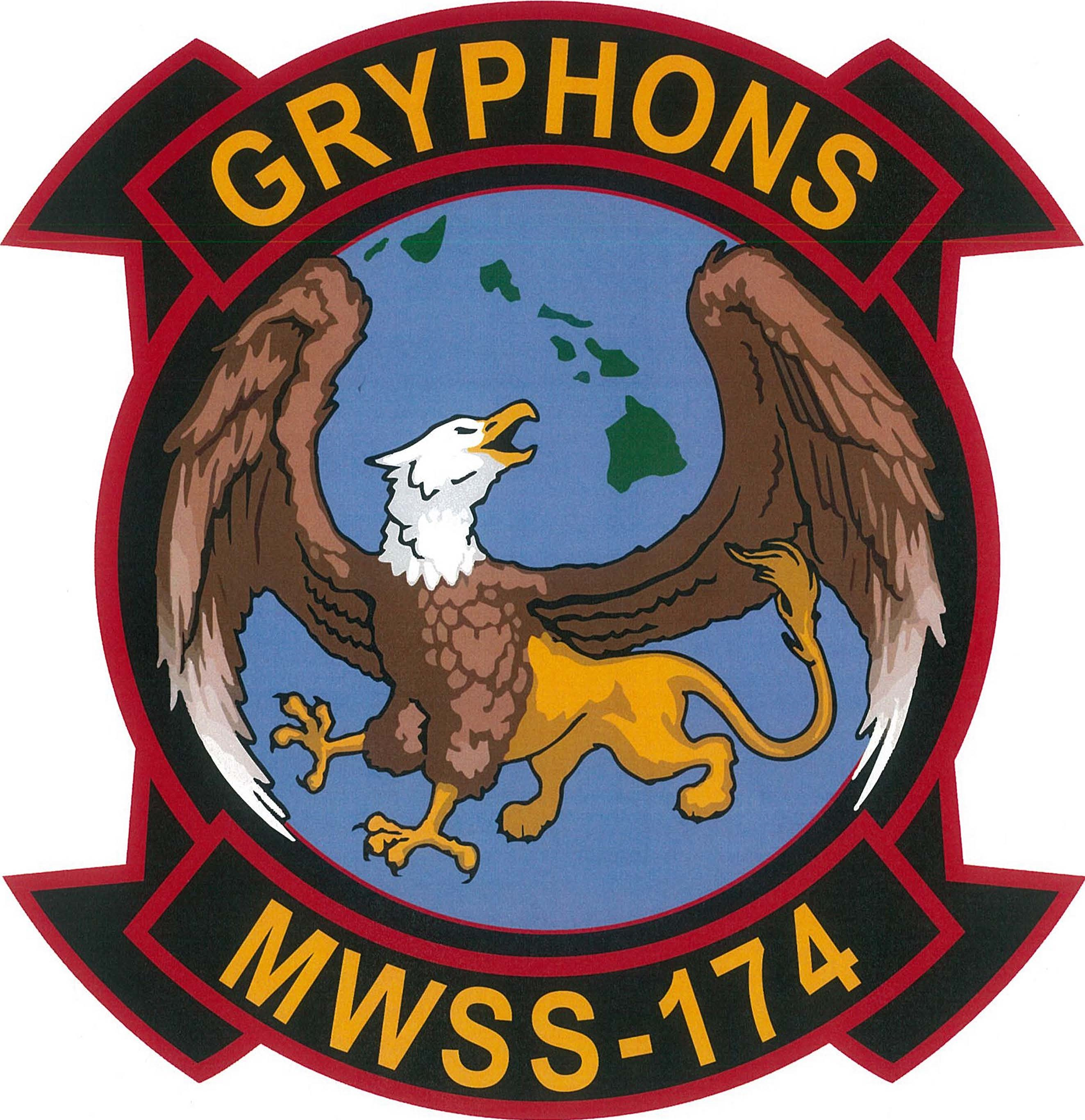
- MWSS-174 insignia
- Active: 1988 - 8 Sep 1994; 24 Apr 2013 - present
- Country: United States
- Branch: United States Marine Corps
- Type: Aviation ground support squadron
- Part of: Marine Aircraft Group 24; 1st Marine Aircraft Wing
- Garrison/HQ: Marine Corps Air Station Kaneohe Bay
- Nickname: Gryphons
- Motto: "Gryphons Will Go!"

Commanders
- Commanding Officer: LtCol Antonio J. Cillo

Marine Wing Support Squadron 174 (MWSS-174) is an aviation ground support unit of the United States Marine Corps.The squadron is based out of Marine Corps Air Station Kaneohe Bay, Hawaii and falls under the command of Marine Aircraft Group 24 and the 1st Marine Aircraft Wing.

== Mission ==
On order, MWSS-174 rapidly deploys task-organized forces to conduct distributed, minimal signature aviation ground support (AGS) operations within the USINDOPACOM Area of Responsibility in order to extend the operational reach and endurance of MAG-24, 1st MAW, and joint expeditionary aviation operations.

== History ==
Marine Wing Support Squadron 174 was originally commissioned in 1988 at Marine Corps Air Station Kaneohe Bay, Hawaii. The squadron supported operations throughout the Persian Gulf and Pacific Region until it was decommissioned on 8 September 1994.

On 8 November 2021 Marine Wing Support Detachment 24 was redesignated as Marine Wing Support Squadron 174 as part of the Marine Corps Force Design 2030 initiative. Force Design aligned an MWSS at each air station assigned to each Marine Aircraft Group.

== Gallery ==
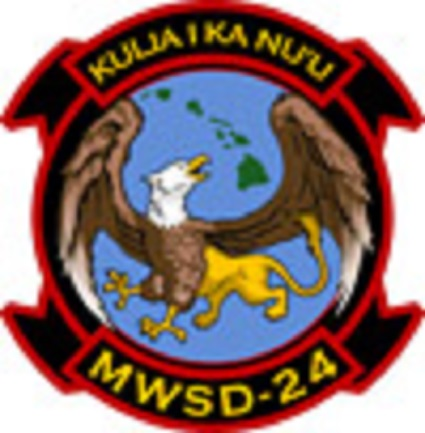

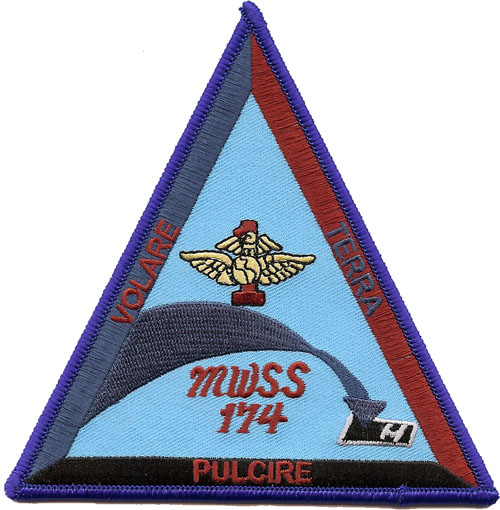

== Awards ==
Since the beginning of World War II, the United States military has honored various units for extraordinary heroism or outstanding non-combat service. This information is compiled by the United States Marine Corps History Division and is certified by the Commandant of the Marine Corps.

Streamer	Award	Year(s)	Additional Info
A red streamer with a horizontal gold stripe and three bronze stars in the center	National Defense Service Streamer	1990-1994, 2013–present	Gulf War, war on terrorism
	Global War on Terrorism Expeditionary Streamer	2013–present	War on terrorism

== See also ==
- United States Marine Corps Aviation
- Organization of the United States Marine Corps
- List of United States Marine Corps aviation support units
