= Dahaneh, Afghanistan =

Town in Helmand Province

Coordinates: 32°21′24″N 064°30′57″E

Dahaneh (Pashto: دهانه) (Qaryah-ye Dahaneh, Qaryah-ye Dahānah) is a town in Helmand Province, Afghanistan. It is located at a crossroads and has a population of about 2,000 (2009 estimate). Elevation is 1,147 metres (3,763 ft). It was the site of the Battle of Dahaneh, 12 August to 15 August 2009, between Taliban insurgents and elements of the Afghan National Army and the United States Marines.

== See also ==
- Helmand Province
