= Battle of Dahaneh =

2009 battle in Afghanistan

- Part of the War in Afghanistan (2001–2021)
Date	August 12, 2009 – August 15, 2009
Location	Dahaneh, Southern Afghanistan and surrounding areas
Result	Coalition victory

Belligerents
United States; Islamic Republic of Afghanistan; United Kingdom	(Afghanistan) Taliban

Commanders and leaders
Capt. Zachary Martin	Mullah Abdullah Gulam Rasoul

Strength
(United States) 400 U.S. Marines (Afghanistan) 100 ANA soldiers Coalition Close Air Support	Unknown

Casualties and losses
(United States) 1 killed	19–22 killed 5 captured

The Battle of Dahaneh took place in the town of Dahaneh, Helmand Province, and its surrounding areas as part of the Afghanistan War. It began when U.S. and Afghan troops launched an Operation to capture the town from the Taliban, in the Helmand Province of Southern Afghanistan. Coalition troops met heavy resistance, and believe the Taliban were forewarned of the incoming attack, though they were successful in securing Dahaneh.

== Background ==
Dahaneh is a town of approximately 2,000 people located in Helmand Province, and serves as a major trading route through Northern Helmand, which is used by the Taliban to transport 60 percent of the world's opium. Prior to the battle, coalition forces had not entered Dahaneh for years, due to a lack of available troops to deploy. The Taliban became de facto rulers of the town, maintaining checkpoints and levying taxes. However, when the Islamist organization threatened to ruin the August 20 Afghan elections, Coalition commanders feared reprisals against the town's residents. Additionally, they hoped to establish a voting center in Daheneh before the elections began, which would be the only voting location in the greater region. Capturing Dahaneh was also key to securing the Now Zad valley, where the Taliban conduct their Opium trade, in which Dahaneh played a significant part.

== Battle ==
=== Day one ===
The operation was code named "Operation Eastern Resolve II". On August 12, 2009, 400 United States Marines from Golf and Weapons Companies 2nd Battalion 3rd Marines and 100 Afghan National Army Soldiers began the Operation. An assault wave in Humvees and MRAPs left a Marine Base in the town of Naw Zad and headed for Dahaneh in the early morning. Three CH-53 Sea Stallion helicopters airlifted soldiers behind Taliban lines in the town. The platoon then blasted its way into a suspected militant compound, where they arrested 5 fighters and took the structure over as a base. U.S. Marine Harrier jets also dropped flares as a show of force. Just before morning light, Taliban fighters fired rockets at the Marines, including a heavy rocket intended for the platoon's compound, which overshot. The insurgents also fired a mortar round at a Humvee on the town's outskirts, which landed 20 meters away. For the next eight hours, the Taliban fired off short bursts of fire at the Coalition troops, and when the soldiers attempted to push into the town, resisted with small arms, rocket-propelled grenades, and mortars. Taliban forces fired ammunition and missiles at the troops from rooftops, courtyards, trucks, and streets, slowing the Coalition advance.

Fighting subsided in the afternoon when the temperature reached 120 degrees Fahrenheit, after which Coalition forces began launching patrols into the city. A Marine patrol was ambushed by the Taliban within yards of the Marine compound at 4 A.M. Heavy fighting resumed. Taliban RPG and Sniper fire targeted the Marine compound which by now also had Afghan troops, but there were no U.S. or Afghan casualties. Taliban fighters fired volleys of rockets from a walled compound at Coalition forces, leading the Marines to call in a missile strike, which killed 7-10 militants inside. Taliban soldiers also attempted to encircle the Coalition troops, and a convoy of Marines in Humvees and MRAPs sitting outside the town was attacked by insurgents' mortar fire. Coalition forces attempted to push further into the town, but were met with heavy resistance from Taliban forces, and made only minor gains. Other Marine units battled Taliban fighters based in the caves of surrounding mountains. After Coalition forces spotted one such cave and called in air support, a British Harrier Jet arrived and locked onto the position, but its pilot refused to fire, as he could not identify the target as British rules of engagement require.

=== Day two ===
August 13, troops began to push deeper into Dahaneh. The Taliban did not offer resistance until daybreak, as they were unable to match the night vision capabilities enjoyed by Coalition troops. However, when morning came, the first rounds of fire erupted. Throughout the day, Afghan soldiers and U.S. Marines pushed deeper into Dahaneh, encountering heavy resistance. A Dozen Taliban fighters were estimated to have been killed in the first 24 hours of fighting, while one Marine died in a Taliban ambush wielding rocket-propelled grenades. The Marines were subject to heavy machine gun fire as they moved through streets and alleyways, but at day's end, had taken about half the town. Sporadic clashes continued. Meanwhile, A-10 aircraft targeted Taliban positions in the surrounding mountains. Officers predicted that it would take several days of fierce fighting to secure Dahaneh.

=== Day three ===
On the third day, Marines launched a pre-dawn raid against a Taliban position on the southern edge of the town, storming a fortified compound and then blowing up two towers from which insurgents had fired rockets and mortars at U.S. troops the day before. Marines found marijuana plants growing in the courtyard and confiscated trigger plates used to manufacture roadside bombs. Fighting continued throughout the day as US missiles continued to target Taliban bunkers in the area. The Taliban were still holding out in the other half of the town, although air strikes and missiles continued to pound their defenses.

=== The battle ends ===
By the fourth day the battle had ended and Coalition troops secured the town, after four years of Taliban control. Five days later, the 2009 Afghan presidential election took place and some residents of Dahaneh participated. However, the level of resistance met led many soldiers and commanders to suspect that the Taliban had been aware of the incoming attack.

Following the battle, Marines assessed civilian damages preparatory to paying out compensation.

== See also ==
- War in Afghanistan (2001–2021)
- International Security Assistance Force
- List of military operations in the war in Afghanistan (2001–2021)
