= Marine Corps Air Station Santa Barbara =

Military installation during World War II

MCAS Santa Barbara Goleta Field
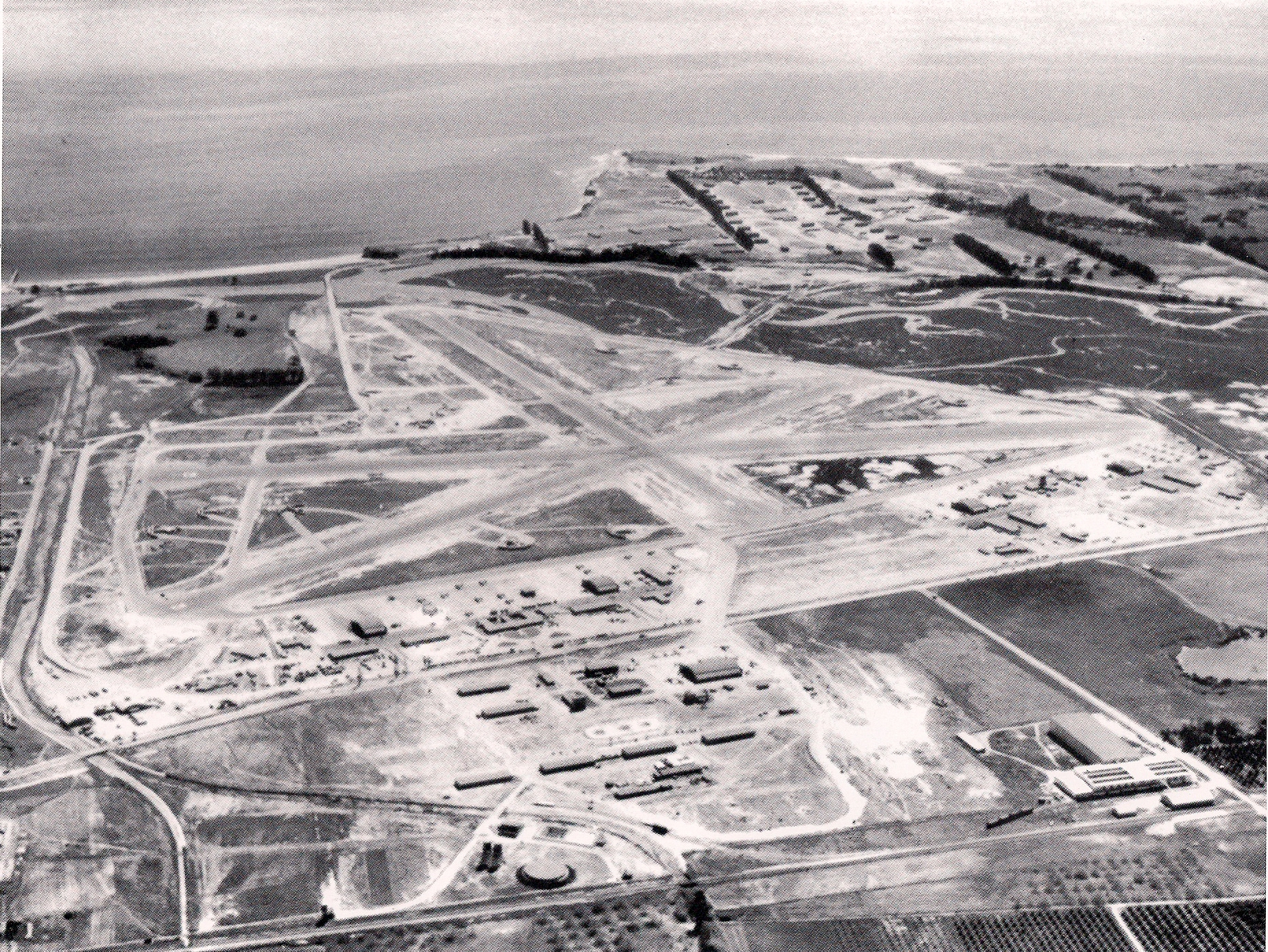
- Overhead MCAS Santa Barbara in April 1944
- IATA: none; ICAO: none

Summary
- Airport type: Military
- Location: Santa Barbara, California
- Coordinates: 34°25′34″N 119°50′25″W
- Interactive map of MCAS Santa Barbara

Runways
Direction	Length		Surface
Direction	ft	m	Surface
	4,500	1,372	Asphalt

Marine Corps Air Station Santa Barbara (MCAS Santa Barbara) was a United States Marine Corps air station that was located in Goleta, California 70 miles (113 km) north of Los Angeles during World War II. It was also known as the Goleta Air Station in the 1940s. Commissioned on 4 December 1942, the air station consisted of an airfield that had been built into the Goleta Slough and served as a training base for numerous squadrons before they deployed to support combat operations in the Pacific Theater. Later in the war, the station would serve as home to Marine squadrons that were trained to operate from aircraft carriers providing close air support for their fellow Marines on the ground. Following the surrender of Japan and the subsequent drawdown of forces that ensued, the air station closed its doors in 1946 and today its property is home to the Santa Barbara Municipal Airport and the campus of the University of California, Santa Barbara.

== History ==
=== Early years ===
In the early 1930s, an airfield and flight school were established in Goleta, California that would later be named the Santa Barbara Municipal Airport. In 1940, the Civil Aeronautics Authority recommended expanding the airfield in the interest of national defense which led to the city purchasing another 568 acres (2.30 km^{2}) and building another terminal and filling in the Goleta Slough to make way for three runways.

=== World War II ===
Marine Corps Air Station Santa Barbara
- Santa Barbara, California

Site information
- Type: Military air station
- Controlled by: USMC

Site history
- Built: 4 December 1942 – 1 March 1946
- In use: 1942 - 1946

Garrison information
- Past commanders: Hayne D. Boyden

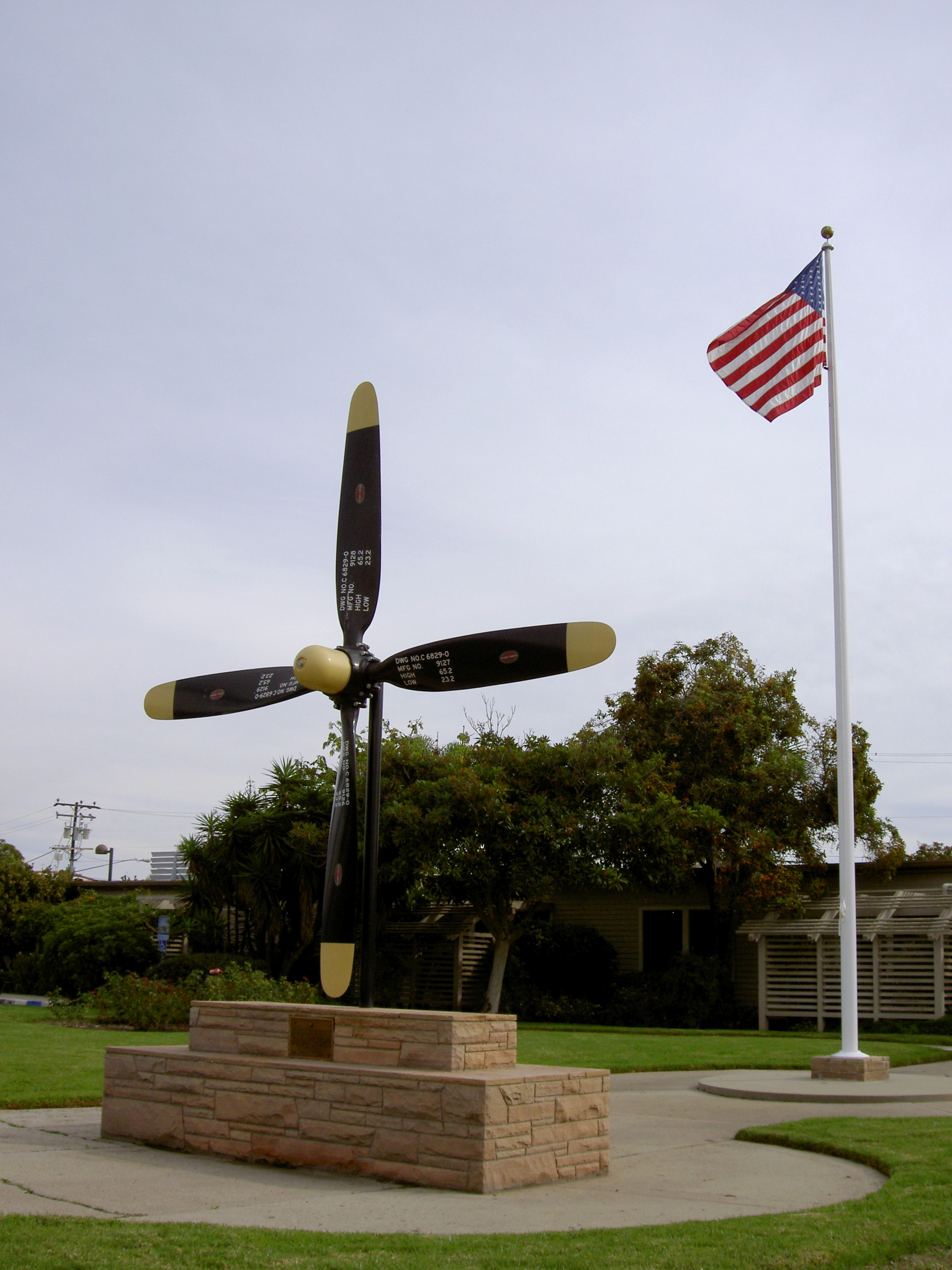
A plaque on this landmark on the former air station reads: "This airport is dedicated to the memory of the pilots and air crews of the United States Marine Corps, trained at this station, who gave their lives to their country. 'Semper Fidelis'. 30 May 1948."

After the outbreak of war, the United States Army Air Corps began to build revetments and station Curtiss P-40 interceptors at the airfield. The first Marines at Goleta came on 14 June 1942, with the arrival of Marine Aircraft Group 24 (MAG-24) and VMSB-243 and VMSB-244, and expanded construction on the base began a month later on 29 May 1942. The field was officially commissioned on 4 December 1942. However, throughout 1942, the threat of a large Japanese strike against the West Coast of the United States kept the base on very high alert, especially after the February, 1942 shelling of Ellwood Oil Field, two miles to the west, as well as the raid against Dutch Harbor in the Aleutian Islands.

The advanced echelon of Marine Base Defense Aircraft Group 42 arrived in January 1943 and would remain for the duration of the war. Conditions surrounding the base also improved in early 1943, when the local slaughterhouse burned down and the hog farm was abandoned. Two unique conditions that affected the base were that U.S. Route 101 ran through the middle of it and during the course of the war, United Air Lines continued to use the field.

In early 1944, after the Battle of Tarawa, where many felt that close air support left much to be desired, General Holland Smith recommended that Marine aviators be trained to operate from aircraft carriers. In July 1944, Commandant of the Marine Corps General Alexander Vandegrift held a meeting with Admiral Chester Nimitz where it was agreed that Marine aircraft would be placed on a certain number of escort carriers to provide close air support for Marines during amphibious landings. This led to the establishment of the Marine Carrier Air Group (MCVG) and the establishment of a command known as Marine Carrier Groups Pacific, which would be based at MCAS Santa Barbara. The goal for the unit was to have eight air groups ready for the expected invasion of Japan late in 1945.

At its peak, the station housed nearly 500 officers, about 3,100 enlisted men, and 440 women Marines. A total of 24 squadrons trained at the base during the war and 101 aviation accidents occurred at the station during training. Following the war, the Marine Corps considered making MCAS Santa Barbara a permanent installation. However, the city of Santa Barbara opposed this, since the area was needed for its municipal airport, as no other land nearby was suitable. The Marine Corps Air Station went into caretaker status on 1 March 1946, and it was released to the War Assets Administration for disposal two months later. Substantial portions of the former air station now compose the Santa Barbara Municipal Airport, while the rest is the campus of the University of California, Santa Barbara. A former hangar houses the Goleta/Santa Barbara Air Heritage Museum.

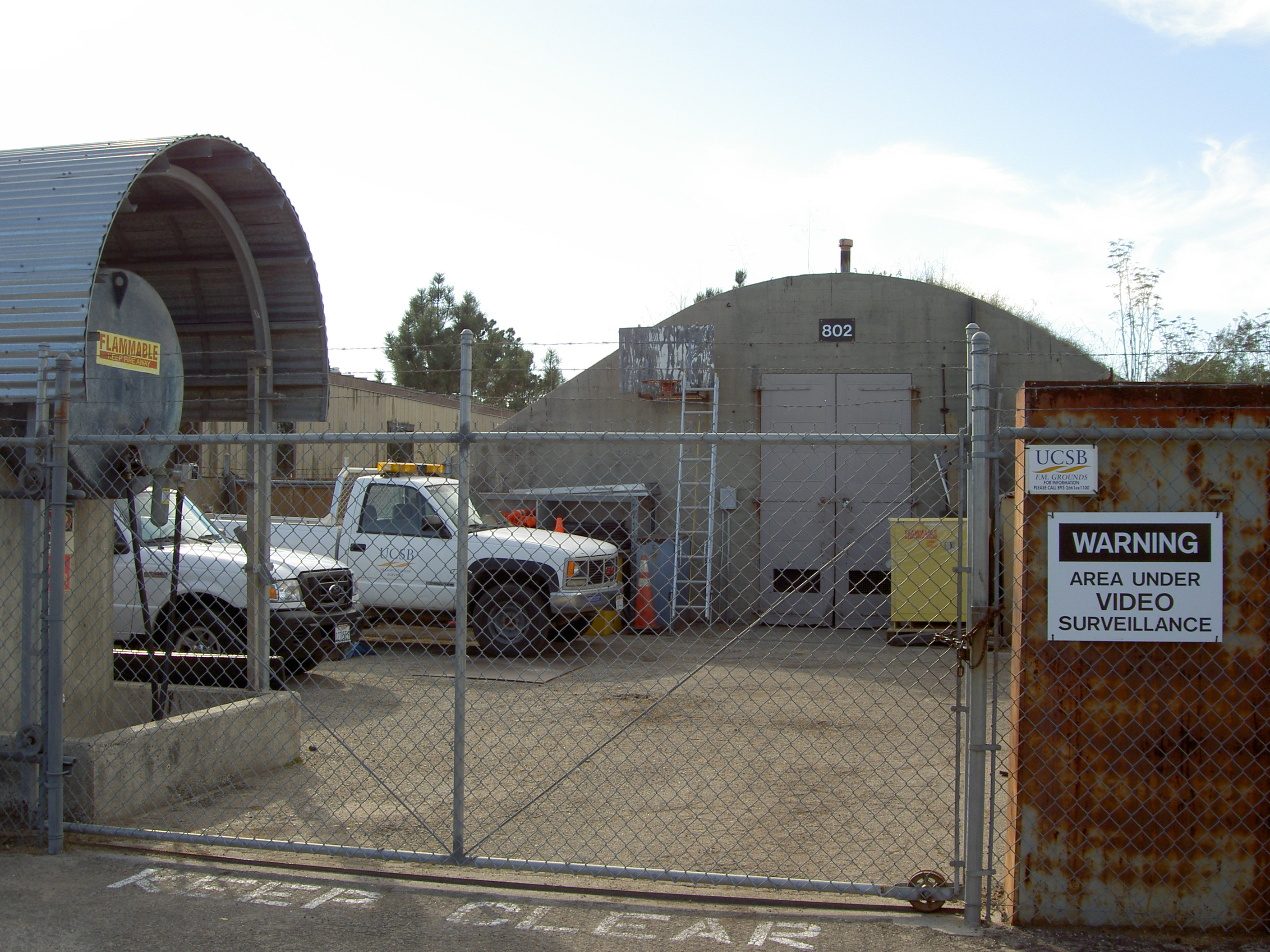
An old munitions bunker used as a storage building by UCSB.

== See also ==
- Isla Vista, California
- United States Marine Corps Aviation
- University of California, Santa Barbara
- List of United States Marine Corps installations
- List of decommissioned United States Marine Corps aircraft squadrons
