= Hayne D. Boyden =

United States Marine Corps Brigadier general

Hayne Davis Boyden
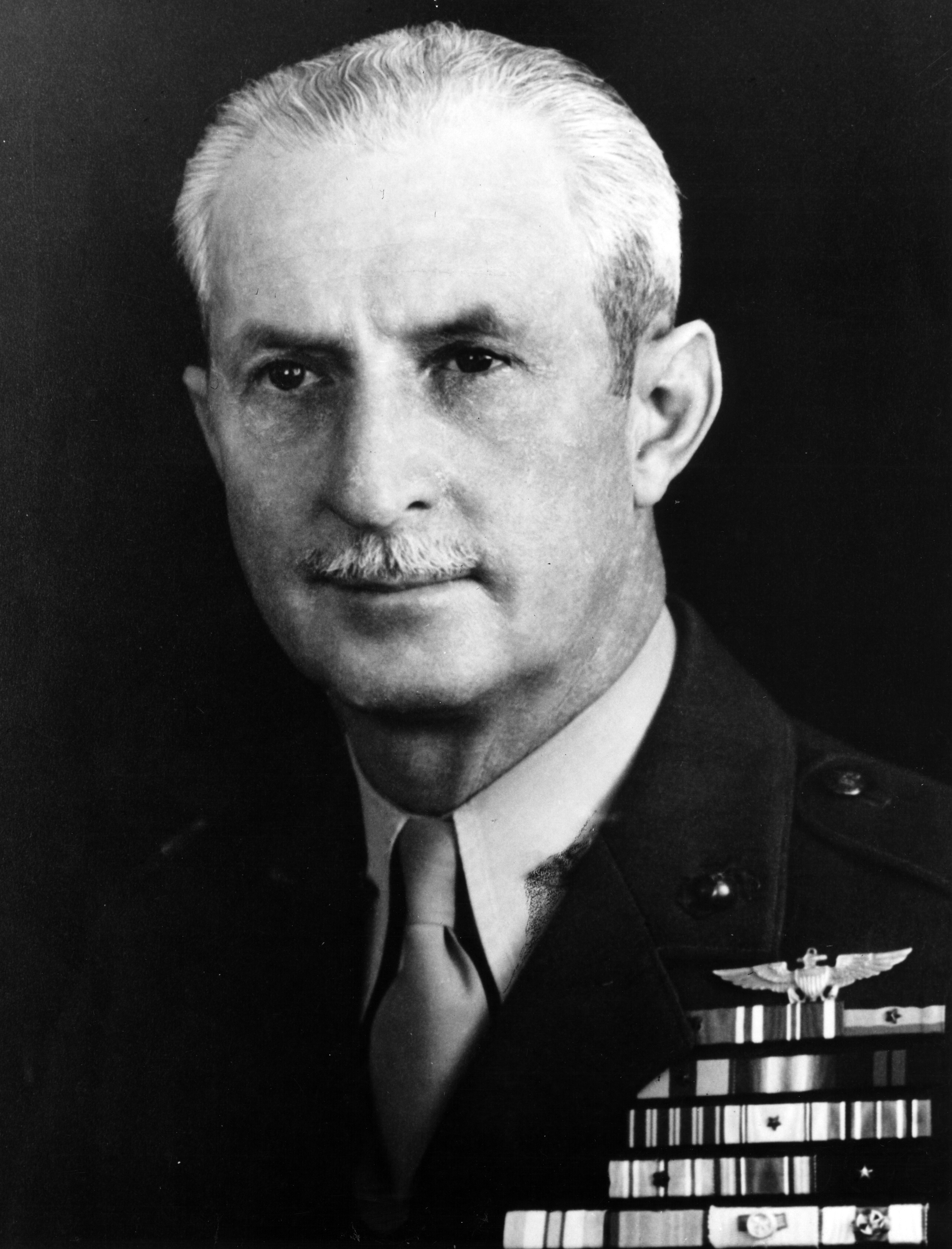
- Boyden as Colonel, USMC
- Born: January 11, 1897; Statesville, North Carolina, US
- Died: August 23, 1978 (aged 81); Asheville, North Carolina, US
- Military career
- Allegiance: United States
- Branch: United States Marine Corps
- Service years: 1918–1949
- Rank: Brigadier General
- Nickname: "Cuckoo"
- Service number: 0–99
- Commands: MCAS Santa Barbara; Marine Bombing Squadron 2 Marine Observation Squadron 6
- Conflicts: World War I Banana Wars: Dominican Campaign; Haitian Campaign; Nicaraguan Campaign; World War II: Battle of Okinawa
- Awards: Legion of Merit; Distinguished Flying Cross

Hayne Davis Boyden (January 11, 1897 – August 23, 1978) was a highly decorated Naval aviator and aviation pioneer in the United States Marine Corps who retired at the rank of Brigadier General. A veteran of several campaigns of the Banana Wars, Boyden became known in the Marine Corps as a pioneer in Aerial photography. He photographed thousands of square miles of Cuba, Haiti, Nicaragua, Panama and the Olympic forestry region of the Pacific northwest. This aerial photography became the basis for mosaic maps of these areas.

Boyden also distinguished himself as an attack pilot during the Battle of Ocotal in July 1927 and received Distinguished Flying Cross and as Chief of Staff, 2nd Marine Aircraft Wing during World War II. He completed his career as Facilities Officer at Marine Corps Air Station Cherry Point, North Carolina, in June 1949.

== Early career ==
=== Education and World War I ===
Hayne D. Boyden was born on January 11, 1897, in Statesville, North Carolina, as the son of wealthy farmer John L. Boyden and his wife Mary Davis. He was a member of the prominent lawyer family from mother's side and his great-grandfather was Richmond M. Pearson, Chief Justice of the North Carolina Supreme Court from 1858 to 1878. Young Boyden completed grade schools in Statesville and Hill's private school before entered the Brevard College in Brevard, North Carolina. He graduated in summer 1914 and enrolled the Webb School in Bell Buckle, Tennessee.

Boyden completed four-year course in three years, graduating in January 1917 and then taught the geometry and trigonometry there until June 1918. He became interested in flying and took extra mathematics courses to increase his knowdlege. Boyden enlisted the Marine Corps Reserve Flying Corps on August 13, 1918, and was ordered to the Ground School, U.S. Naval Aviation Detachment at the Massachusetts Institute of Technology at Cambridge for three-month course. Upon the completion of the ground school in December that year, he was sent as Gunnery sergeant to the Marine Flying School at Miami, Florida, together with another Marine sergeant, future general and Medal of Honor recipient Christian F. Schilt.

By the beginning of June 1919, Boyden completed the course and was commissioned second lieutenant in the Marine Corps Reserve. He was subsequently ordered to Marine Officers' Training School at Marine Barracks, Quantico, Virginia for officers' instruction, unfortunately due to postwar reorganization of the Marine Corps and budget cuts, Boyden was relieved from active duty on August 18, 1919.

=== First aviation duty ===
However, due to resignations of several officers who had been selected for retention on active duty, he was re-appointed second lieutenant in the Regular Marine Corps on September 2, 1919. Boyden resumed his officers' training at Quantico and completed his instruction in December that year. He was then assigned to Squadron "D," Marine Air Forces, 2nd Provisional Brigade and departed for Santo Domingo.

Boyden participated in air patrols over the jungles of Santo Domingo until July 1921, when his unit was transferred to Haiti for similar duty. While in Santo Domingo, Boyden unit was redesignated Marine Observation Squadron One and he designed squadron's insignia, the famous Ace of Spades. The distinctive emblem bore the letters "A" and "S". As conceived by Boyden, the ace being the first card in a suit stood for "First" while "A" and "S" represented the words "Air" and "Squadron". This design is the first official unit insignia to appear in the Marine Corps aviation.

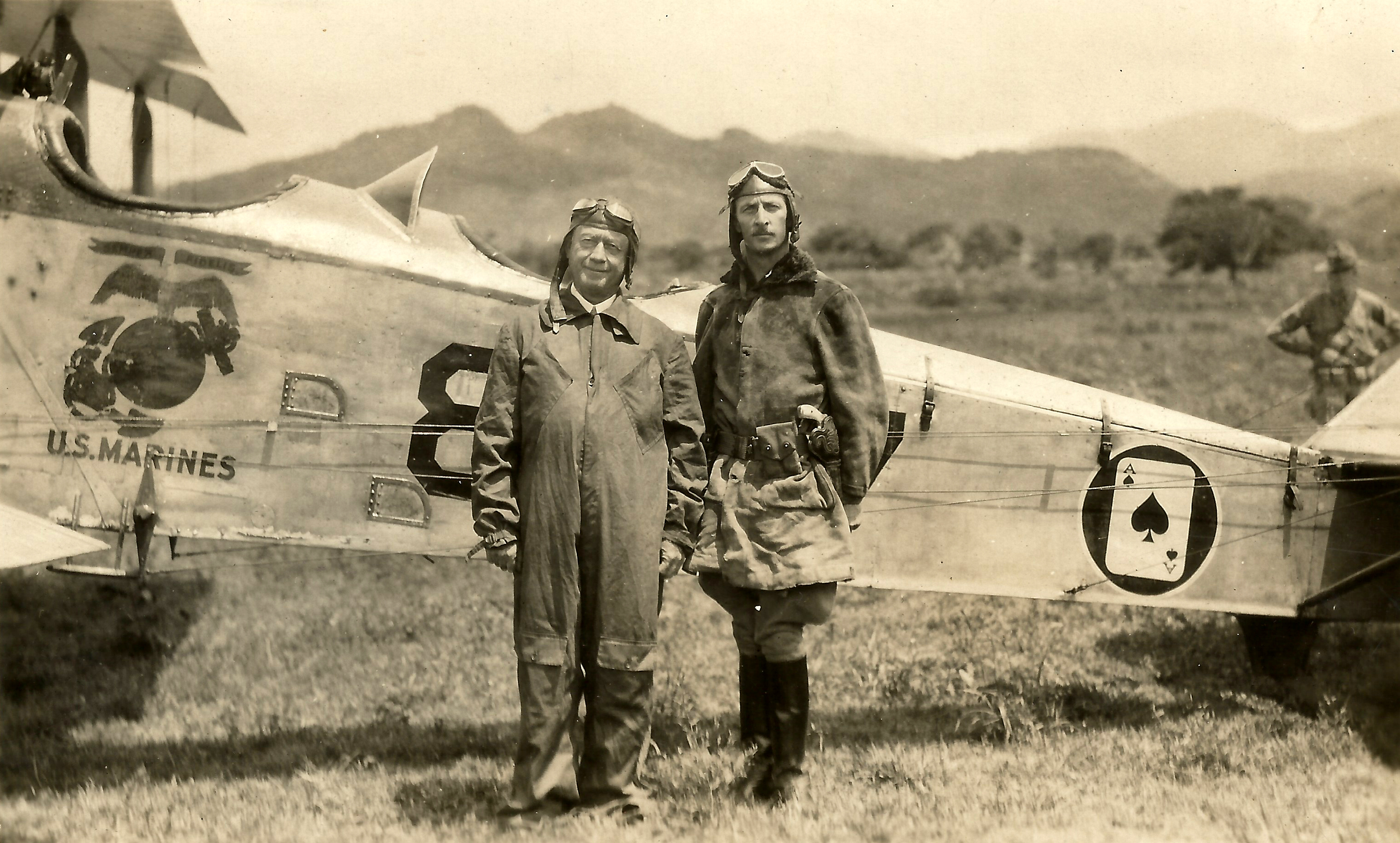
Boyden and a United States Senator in Nicaragua in September 1932.

During the flight from Santo Domingo to Port-au-Prince, the engine of Boyden's plane suffered mechanical failure over the Maimón mountains and he was forced to parachute to safety. He and his passenger survived the crash, but suffered a fractured skull, which also resulted in permanent loss of hearing in his left ear. Boyden was forced to march 25 miles through dense jungle for two days, before he reached help.

He spent almost a year in hospital, before he was declared fit for duty again and returned to the United States by the end of April 1922. Boyden was then assigned to Marine Corps Flying Field Quantico, Virginia, and remained there until March 1923, when he was ordered to the Air Corps Technical School at Chanute Field in Rantoul, Illinois, for a course of instruction in aerial photography.

In December 1923, Boyden completed the course and was assigned to special temporary duty with the Marine Corps Expeditionary Force of the United States Fleet. He was promoted to first lieutenant on June 16, 1924, and married Amanda Mayo, a daughter of Navy Captain Chester G. Mayo that year. Captain Mayo was the son of former Commander-in-Chief, Atlantic Fleet, Admiral Henry T. Mayo. Their marriage lasted only seven years, ending with divorce and no children. Boyden remarried to Dorothy A. Townsend in 1933 and they had one son.

During the fall of 1924, Boyden was ordered to Port-au-Prince, Haiti on a special temporary assignment to photograph the valley of Artibonite River. Hie aerial map proved invaluable to the Haitian government in developing the valley for agricultural purposes. Photographing approximately 300 square miles of terrain from 10,000 feet, Boyden's work was highly praised. by the Adjutant and Inspector of the Marine Corps, Rufus H. Lane as well as by Major General Commandant of the Marine Corps, John A. Lejeune.

Boyden then remained in Haiti as a member of Observation Squadron 2 and received a Letter of Commendation from the Secretary of the Navy, Curtis D. Wilbur for reaching year's highest score with the free machine gun during individual battle practice. He then resumed his photographic duties and participated in the photographing of Gulf of Fonseca. For his service in Haiti, Boyden later received National Order of Honour and Merit by the Haitian Government.

In December 1926, Boyden returned to the United States and was assigned to the Naval Air Station North Island, California. He was subsequently tasked with the command of Marine air mapping expedition, send to make an aerial survey and mosaic map of the Olympic forestry region of the Pacific northwest.

=== Nicaraguan campaign ===
In March 1927, Boyden was assigned to VO-1M (Observation Squadron 1) under Major Ross E. Rowell. VO-1M departed for Nicaragua, where they joined the 2nd Marine Brigade under Brigadier General Logan Feland. Their task was to support ground forces of the brigade in combat against the Sandinistas, rebels led by Augusto César Sandino. VO-1M also conducted air patrols over the jungles of Nicaragua, searching for rebel forces.

On July 16, 1927, Boyden led an air patrol of two planes, and discovered the 37-man Marine detachment at Ocotal under attack by several hundred Sandinistas, who were cutting their telegraph line and using sniper fire to suppress their advance. At around 10:00 am, Boyden landed his plane near the town, grabbed a passing peasant, and after a quick interrogation, headed south to Managua to report the situation to Major Rowell.

Major Rowell then flew a five plane detachment of Airco DH.4s to help relieve the garrison. The dive-bombing runs from low altitude made by Rowell, Boyden, and their men marked one of the first coordinated dive-bombing attacks in aviation history. The Sandinistas fled, many abandoning their arms, and leaving 56 dead. Only one U.S. Marine was killed in action and five were wounded. For his service during the battle, Boyden was decorated with the Distinguished Flying Cross and also the Cross of Valor from Nicaragua.

=== Further aerial photography duty ===
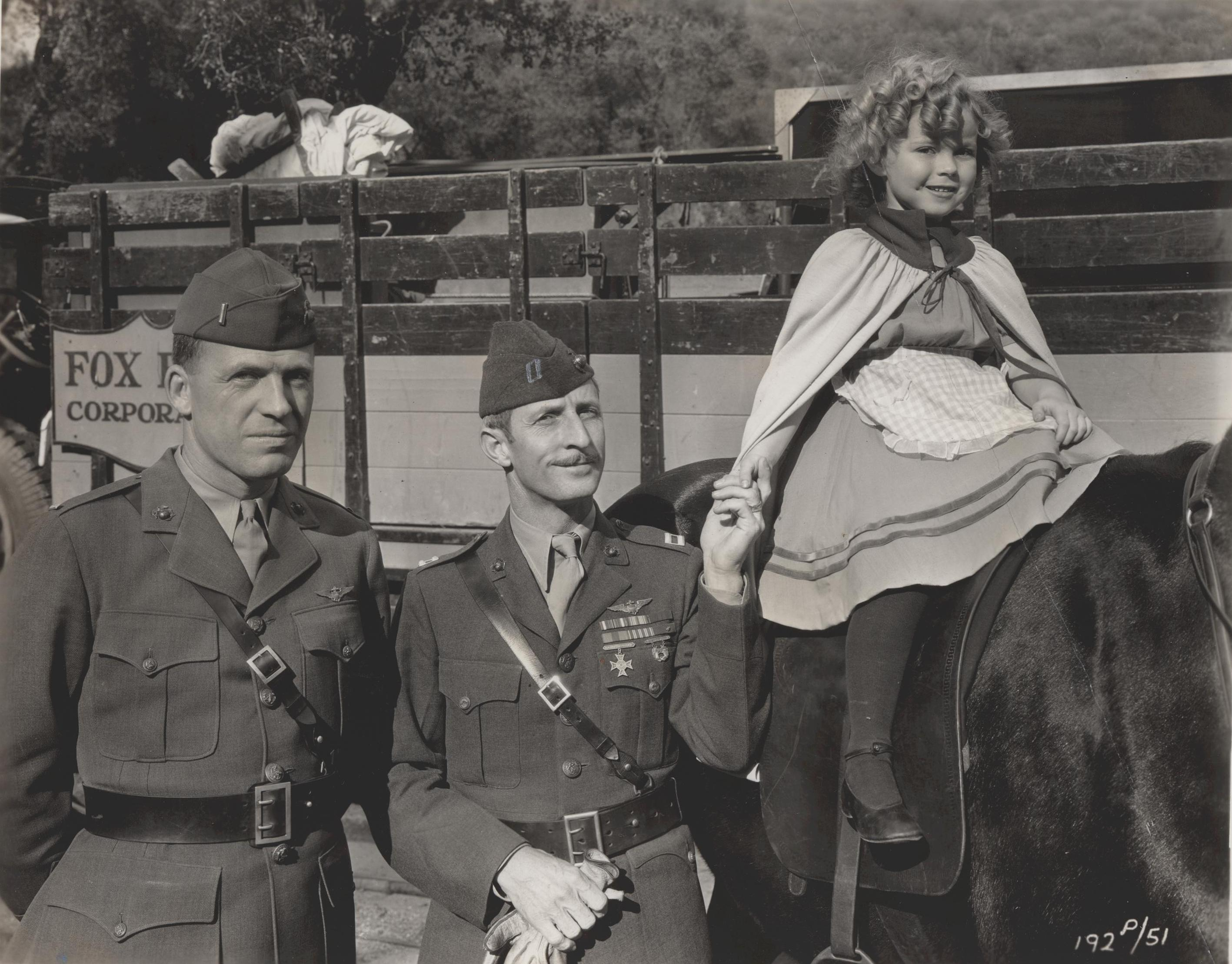
Boyden (center) with 1st Lt. Caleb T. Bailey (left) and Shirley Temple on the Set of The Little Colonel, 1935.

Boyden had gained a reputation as an aerial photography expert and his services were required again in September 1927, when he was ordered to Naval Air Station Key West, Florida. He was tasked with photographing the whole north and south coasts of Cuba. His excellent work was later praised by then-Chief of the Bureau of Navigation, Rear Admiral Richard H. Leigh from whom he received a Letter of Appreciation.

Upon finishing his task in Cuba, Boyden and his unit were sent to Coco Solo, Panama Canal Zone, where he conducted an aerial survey of the Gulf of Panama. He photographed 10,000 square miles of territory, before returning to the United States to complete his photographic work for the Cuban Expedition. Boyden again astonished Commandant Lejeune and Chief of Navigation Bureau Leigh and received another Letter of Commendation from them both.

In October 1928, Boyden was transferred to Marine Observation Squadron 6 at Marine Corps Air Station, Quantico, Virginia and served as the squadron's acting commanding officer during October that year. He remained at Quantico until November 1929, when he was transferred to Naval Air Station Pensacola, Florida, for duty as an instructor at the Naval Aviators' School.

In May 1930, Boyden was on a flight above Pensacola Bay with a student pilot, when the plane suddenly went into a spin and dove 3,000 feet into the bay. The student was uninjured but Boyden suffered a brain concussion and fractured skull. He spent five months in the hospital, before he was declared fit for duty again and ordered to the Headquarters Marine Corps. Boyden was then tasked with the photographing Marine Barracks Parris Island, South Carolina, and making a large mosaic map of the base, that could be used in the planned development of the facility. He later received another Letter of Commendation from Major General Smedley Butler, commanding general of Parris Island, for his work.

Boyden then resumed duty as Squadron's Photographic Officer of the Aircraft Squadrons, East Coast Expeditionary Force under Major Roy S. Geiger and remained in that capacity until June 1932, when he embarked for Nicaragua again as a member of the Aircraft Squadrons, 2nd Marine Brigade. The main task of the Marine forces in that country was to supervise the Nicaraguan elections of 1932, peacekeeping operations and training of the members of Nicaraguan National Guard.

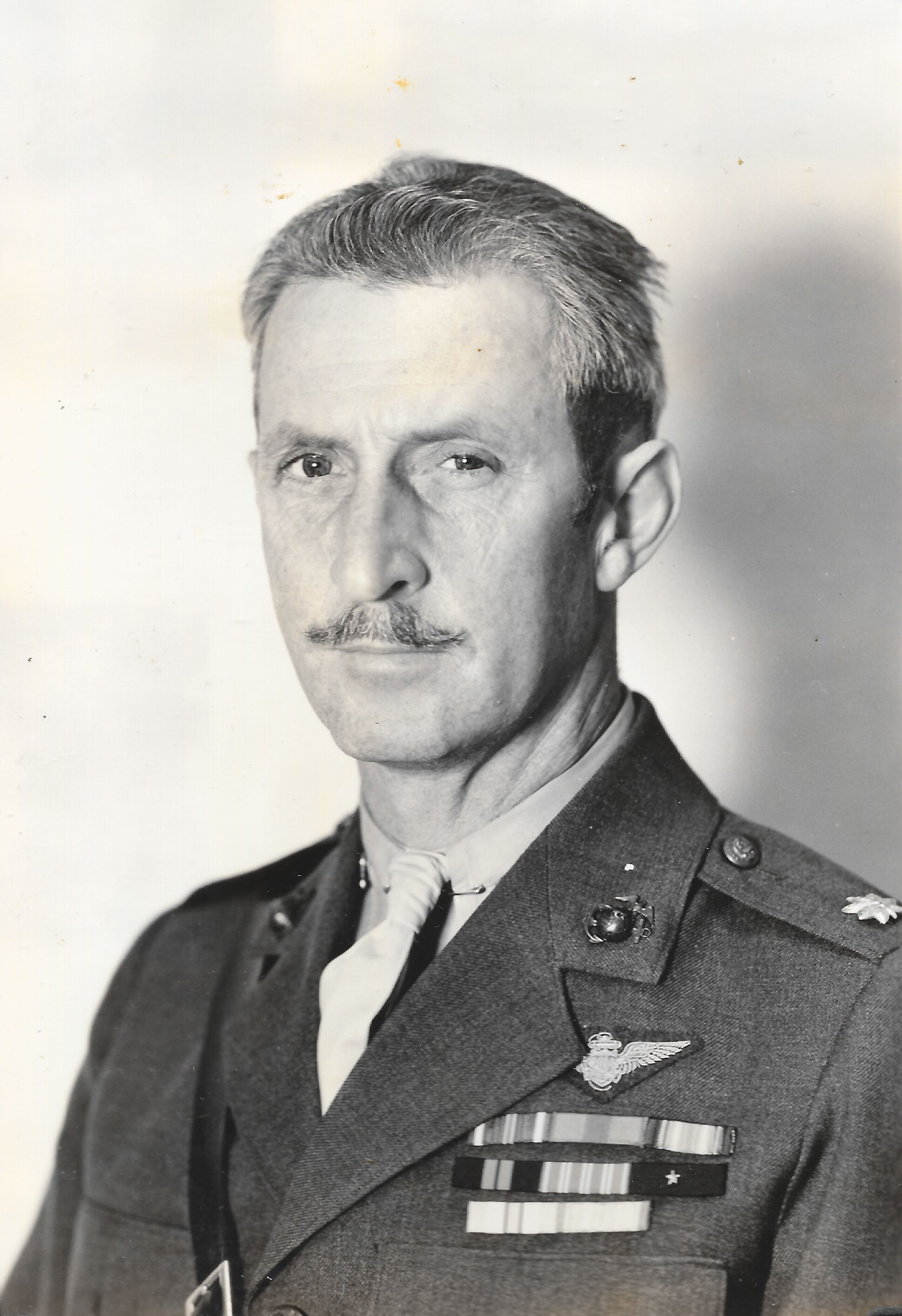
Boyden as Major in September 1938.

In August 1932, Boyden participated in the search for Marine patrol of three men, which lost in the jungle. Upon locating them, he flew food and supplies out to them and in addition, he dropped emergency supplies to a rescue patrol of the Nicaraguan National Guard and then guided them to the lost Marines. For his second tour in Nicaragua, Boyden received a Presidential Medal of Merit with Diploma from the Government of Nicaragua and also shared the Letter of commendation won by the squadrons for their cooperation during the elections.

Boyden returned to the United States in September that year and was stationed again at Quantico until June 1933, when he embarked for Port-au-Prince, Haiti as a member of the Observation Squadron 9. He remained in Haiti until July 1934, when he returned to the United States for brief period before he was ordered back to Nicaragua for his third tour. The Marines were withdrawing from the country following the mutual agreement between two countries and Boyden was tasked with the preparation of the evacuation flight of all Observation Squadron 9 planes still remaining in Nicaragua.

The flight consisted of nine observation land planes, one observation amphibian plane and one transport amphibian plane. He completed the task successfully and received another Letter of commendation for the excellent performance of a difficult mission. Boyden was promoted to Captain on November 30, 1934, after ten years as first lieutenant.

He then joined Aircraft One at Marine Corps Air Station Quantico, Virginia, and remained in that capacity until October 1935, when he flew two Department of Agriculture engineers on an inspection trip over the interior of Puerto Rico and later went to that island to be Officer-in-Charge of the construction of a landing field at Culebra. Boyden later served at the Marine Corps Air Station at St. Thomas, Virgin Islands, before returned to the States in August 1936.

Boyden was subsequently ordered to the Air Corps Tactical School at Maxwell Air Force Base, in Montgomery, Alabama, for a course in instruction. He was in the same class as future generals William O. Brice and Vernon E. Megee and they graduated in July 1937. Boyden then joined Aircraft Two in San Diego, California, and remained there until July 1938, when he was promoted to Major and succeeded Major Frank D. Weir as commanding officer of Marine Bombing Squadron 2.

He led his squadron during the series of exercises aboard aircraft carrier Ranger and participated in the winter fleet operations in the Caribbean based at Guantánamo Bay, Cuba. Boyden remained in that command until the end of January 1940, when he was ordered to Washington, D.C. for new assignment.

== World War II ==
Boyden was ordered to the Office of Naval Intelligence for a two-month preparatory indoctrination course and upon the completion, he embarked for Havana, Cuba and succeeded his former superior commanding officer, Ross E. Rowell as Naval attaché and Naval attaché for Air to the American Ambassador George S. Messersmith. He had to face an attempts of enemy's spies, who raided his office in Havana and stole some documents in November 1940 and also abortive revolution in February 1941.

Following the Japanese attack on Pearl Harbor and the United States entry into World War II, Boyden assisted in the evacuation of total 450 civilians dependents of the Naval personnel at Guantánamo Bay and was praised by the Commandant of the Naval Base there, Rear admiral George L. Weyler. Boyden was promoted to the temporary rank of lieutenant colonel on January 26, 1942, and assumed additional duty as Naval attaché for Haiti two months later. He was later promoted to the temporary rank of Colonel on October 13, 1942, and served in Cuba until August 1943, when he was succeeded by Colonel John N. Hart and ordered back to the United States for new assignment. For his service in Cuba, Boyden was decorated with Order of Naval Merit, 1st Class and Red Cross Medal of the Order of Honor and Merit, rank Commander by the Cuban Government.

Boyden then reported at the Headquarters Marine Corps in Washington, D.C. and was attached to the Division of Aviation under Major general Louis E. Woods. However he remained there only for two weeks and was transferred to Marine Corps Air Station Cherry Point, North Carolina, where he assumed duty as Assistant Wing Commander, 3rd Marine Aircraft Wing under Brigadier general Claude A. Larkin. He participated in the training of replacements Marine air crews until December 1943, when he was ordered to the Army Air Forces School of Applied Tactics at Orlando Army Air Base, Florida, and completed one-month instruction there.

He was subsequently ordered to the Army Command and General Staff College at Fort Leavenworth, Kansas, and completed another one-month course of instruction there. Boyden was then sent to the Army and Navy Staff College in Washington, D.C. and completed his third instruction after two months in April 1944. He was then assigned to the headquarters, Marine Air, West Coast in San Diego, California, under Major General Francis P. Mulcahy.

In July 1944, Boyden was then ordered to Espiritu Santo and assumed duty as Chief of Staff, 2nd Marine Aircraft Wing (2nd MAW) under Major general James T. Moore. The 2nd MAW just returned from combats in Northern Solomons and served mainly to train and outfits Marine air units through the summer of 1944. Following the Battle of Peleliu in November 1944, the 2nd MAW moved there and served as Garrison Air Force, Western Carolines. Boyden was largely responsible for preparing the wing for the operation, procuring equipment and personnel, arranging transportation, assigning and training officers and non-commissioned officers to specific duties, and coordinating the entire organization into a smooth functioning combat unit.

By the end of April 1945, the 2nd MAW was ordered to Okinawa to support the landing troops. Boyden was in command of the rear echelon after embarkation of the assault unit, and was responsible for completing preparations for the movement of his troops and equipment. Landing on Okinawa on May 1, he was indefatigable in carrying on the details of administration under the new Commanding General of the Wing, Francis P. Mulcahy, being especially diligent in arranging for the security of the camp and effecting physical improvements. He carried on his work in exposed areas heedless of danger, and his disregard of personal safety was an inspiration to the entire command. For his service during the Okinawa campaign, Boyden was decorated with Legion of Merit with Combat "V" and also received Navy Presidential Unit Citation.

== Postwar service ==
Boyden returned to the United States in August 1945 and after brief tour at Headquarters Marine Corps in Washington, D.C., he was ordered to California for duty as Commanding Officer of Marine Corps Air Station Santa Barbara. The Marine Corps considered making MCAS Santa Barbara a permanent installation, however the city of Santa Barbara opposed this, since the area was needed for its municipal airport, as no other land nearby was suitable. The Marine Corps Air Station went into caretaker status on March 1, 1946, and it was released to the War Assets Administration for disposal two months later. Boyden supervised the decommissioning of the base and received a letter of appreciation from the Mayor of Santa Barbara, Herbert E. Weyler, for the fine relations between the station and the city.

He was subsequently ordered back to Marine Corps Air Station Cherry Point, North Carolina, where he assumed duty as Facilities Officer under Brigadier General Ivan W. Miller. His main duty was to maintain the cleanliness, general appearance and maintenance of the base. Boyden retired on June 30, 1949, after 31 years of active service and was advanced to the rank of brigadier general on the retired list for having been specially commended in combat.

== Retirement ==
Following his retirement from the Marine Corps, Boyden remained with his wife at the Cherry Point Air Station, before moved to Asheville, North Carolina, where he died on August 23, 1978, aged 81. He was buried at McKendree United Methodist Church Cemetery in Manquin, Virginia, with his second wife Dorothy Antoinette Townsend Boyden (1909–1978). They had together one son, Richmond P. Boyden.

== Decorations ==
Brigadier general Boyden's personal decorations include:

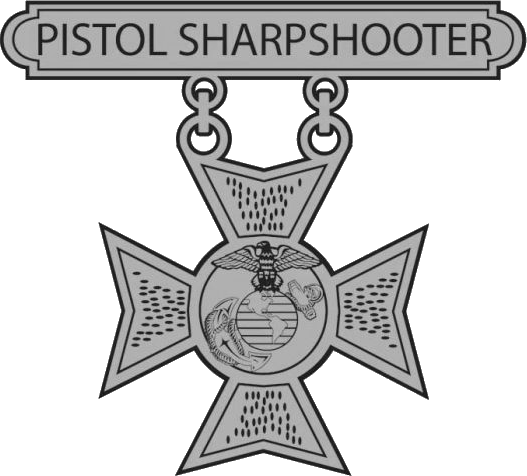

Naval Aviator Badge
1st Row	Legion of Merit with Combat "V"	Distinguished Flying Cross	Navy Presidential Unit Citation with one star	Marine Corps Expeditionary Medal with one 3/16 inch service star
2nd Row	World War I Victory Medal	Haitian Campaign Medal	Second Nicaraguan Campaign Medal	American Defense Service Medal with Base Clasp
3rd Row	American Campaign Medal	Asiatic-Pacific Campaign Medal with one 3/16 inch service star	World War II Victory Medal	Nicaraguan Presidential Medal of Merit with Star and Diploma
4th Row	Nicaraguan Cross of Valor	Haitian National Order of Honour and Merit, rank Chevalier	Cuban Order of Naval Merit, 1st Class with White ribbon	Cuban Red Cross Medal of the Order of Honor and Merit, rank Commander
