= VMFA-231 =

Marine Fighter Attack Squadron 231
- VMFA-231 insignia
- Active: 8 Feb 1919 - Mar 1946; Sep 1948 - 31 Aug 1962; 15 May 1973 - 29 May 2025; 4 June 2026 – present
- Country: United States
- Allegiance: United States of America
- Branch: United States Marine Corps
- Type: Fighter Attack Squadron
- Role: Close air support Air interdiction Aerial reconnaissance Multirole combat
- Part of: Marine Aircraft Group 14; 2nd Marine Aircraft Wing
- Garrison/HQ: Marine Corps Air Station Cherry Point
- Nickname: Ace of Spades
- Mottos: First and Finest
- Tail Code: CG
- Engagements: World War I Banana Wars * Battle of Ocotal; World War II * Battle of Midway * Battle of Guadalcanal; Operation Desert Storm; Operation Deny Flight; Operation Allied Force; Operation Joint Guardian; Operation Shining Hope; Operation Enduring Freedom; Operation Iraqi Freedom

Commanders
- Notable commanders: Alfred A. Cunningham; Ross E. Rowell; Stanley E. Ridderhof

Aircraft flown
- Attack: AV-8A Harrier; AV-8B Harrier II
- Bomber: SB2U Vindicator; SBD Dauntless
- Fighter: F-35B Lightning II

Marine Fighter Attack Squadron 231 (VMFA-231) is a United States Marine Corps fixed wing fighter-attack squadron that consists of F-35B Lightning II (STOVL) jets. The squadron, known as the "Ace of Spades", is based at Marine Corps Air Station Cherry Point, North Carolina and falls under the command of Marine Aircraft Group 14 (MAG-14) and the 2nd Marine Aircraft Wing (2nd MAW).

The squadron conducted its final AV-8B Harrier II flight on 29 May 2025 and VMA-231 was deactivated later in 2025. It was reactivated as Marine Fighter Attack Squadron 231 (VMFA-231) on 4 June 2026. The squadron is now transitioning to and operating the F-35B Lightning II.

== History ==
=== Early years ===
VMA-231 began in Miami, Florida as the 1st Division, Squadron 1 on 8 February 1919 — a unit that emerged from the Northern Bombing Group of Northern France in 1918. By the end of February, the newly activated squadron arrived in San Pedro de Macorís, Santo Domingo for duty with the 2nd Brigade where it served until July 1924. During its deployment to Santo Domingo, the squadron was designated Marine Observation Squadron One (VO-1M) on 1 July 1922.

The squadron's insignia, the famous Ace of Spades, was designed by then-2nd Lieutenant Hayne D. Boyden, a member of the squadron. The distinctive emblem bore the letters "A" and "S". As conceived by Boyden, the ace being the first card in a suit stood for "First" while "A" and "S" represented the words "Air" and "Squadron". This design is the first official unit insignia to appear in Marine Corps aviation.

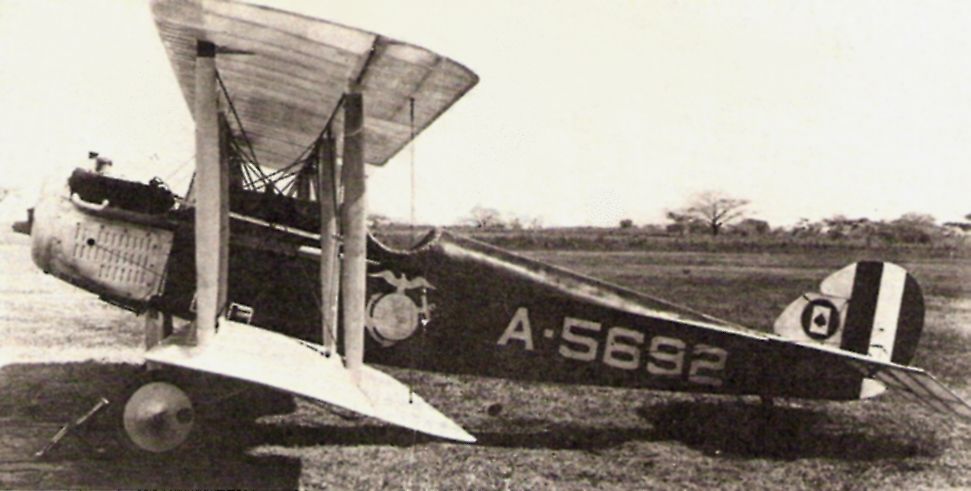
A Vought VE-7F from VO-1M in Santo Domingo, Dominican Republic c. 1922.

From Santo Domingo the squadron traveled to San Diego, California and became the first Marine squadron on the West Coast and was designated as the aviation asset to accompany Marine Expeditionary Forces. During the West Coast interlude, the late Major General Ross E. Rowell, then a Major and Commanding Officer concentrated on training in dive-bombing tactics. Such tactics were to prove invaluable to the squadron in Nicaragua, during July 1927, where the squadron had been ordered the previous February. Shortly after its redesignation on 1 July 1927 to VO-8M, the squadron participated in the Battle of Ocotal on 16 July when ten personnel of the squadron came to the rescue of the beleaguered Marine garrison at Ocotal and executed the first recorded dive bombing attack against an organized enemy, dispersing the insurgents and saving the garrison. Among the first Marine aviators ever to receive the Distinguished Flying Cross were Major Rowell and Lieutenant Hayne D. Boyden, to whom it was awarded for their participation in the Battle of Ocotal.

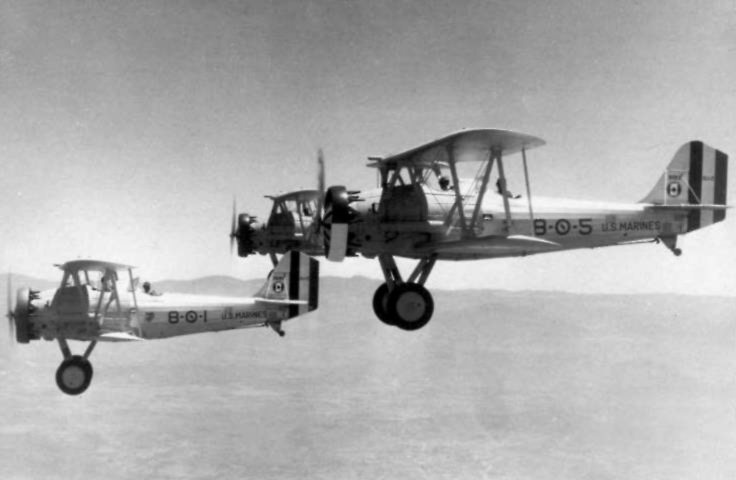
A flight of Vought SU-2 Corsairs from VO-8M c. 1934.

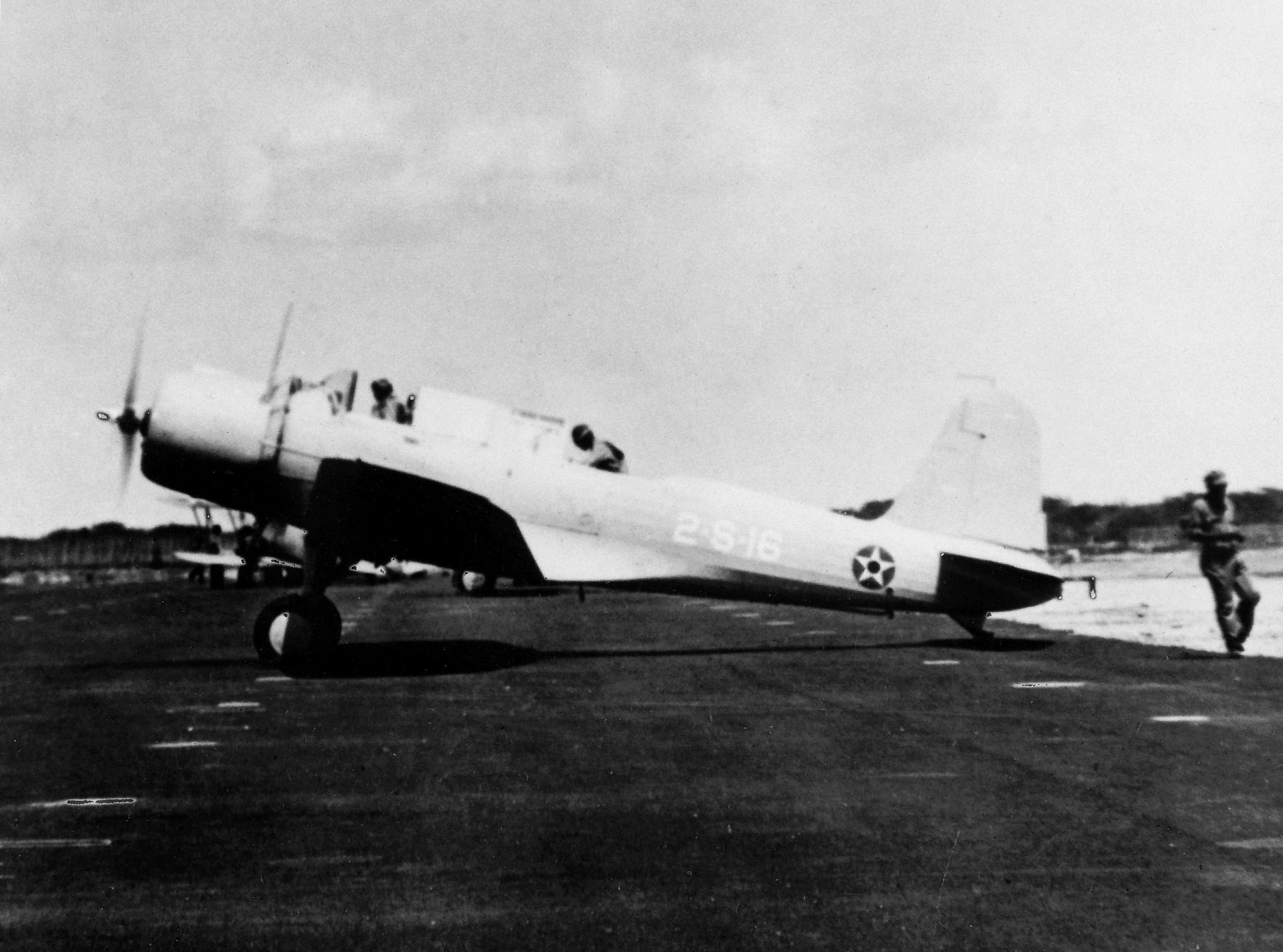
An SB2U-3 of VMS-2 at MCAS Ewa, in 1941.

Returning to San Diego in 1928, the squadron traded in its World War I-era O2B-1s for new Curtiss F8C-1s and F8C-3s, which were soon redesignated OC-1s and OC-2s. Shortly after receiving the F8C/OCs, the squadron, along with VO-10M took part in the filming of the 1929 movie Flight. As Marine aviation reorganized and consolidated in the early 1930s, several long established squadrons ceased to exist, and on 1 July 1933, VO-8M was deactivated.

Unlike the fate that befell her sister squadrons, VO-8M was reactivated on 15 November 1934 when it was decided to decommission VS-14M and VS-15M and use the aircraft and personnel from these two carrier squadrons to reorganize VO-8M. Equipped with Vought O3U-6 "Corsairs", the squadron continued to operate from San Diego and participated in the annual Fleet Problems, operating from the aircraft carriers USS Langley (CV-1), USS Ranger (CV-4), and USS Saratoga (CV-3) at different times, and it participated in the filming of the 1935 movie Devil Dogs of the Air. In 1936, the squadron was selected to represent Marine Aviation at the National Air Races was still flying the O3U-6 when it was redesignated Marine Scouting Squadron Two (VMS-2) on 1 July 1937. Later that year, the squadron traded in its "Corsairs" for Curtiss SOC-3 Seagulls a type it would operate for the next four years.

With the rest of Marine Air Group Two, the squadron deployed to Marine Corps Air Station Ewa, Hawaii in January 1941, and was the second squadron to receive the new Vought SB2U Vindicator eventually receiving 27 of the type in 1941. Along with the new aircraft came a new designation, and on 1 July 1941, the squadron was redesignated Marine Scout-Bombing Squadron 231 (VMSB-231). With the prospect of war growing, the squadron, under the command of Major Clarence J. Chappell, embarked upon the aircraft carrier USS Lexington (CV-2) during the first week of December 1941 and was on its way to Midway Atoll when word of the attack on Pearl Harbor reached the carrier.

=== World War II ===
Although the squadron was aboard the Lexington during the attack on Pearl Harbor, the rear echelon, still at MCAS Ewa suffered the loss of seven spare SB2U-3s which had been left behind. The squadron returned to MCAS Ewa on 10 December 1941, but one week later it was headed back to Midway, but not aboard a carrier. Fitted with an extra fuel tank and accompanied by a PBY Catalina flying boat acting as a plane guard, the squadron conducted the longest overwater flight by single-engine aircraft on record at that time and arrived at Midway without the loss of a single aircraft or crew. The squadron flew routine patrols and awaited the expected Japanese attack. On 1 March 1942, while still at Midway, the squadron was split in two when VMSB-241 was created and the two squadrons operated side by side, even flying the same aircraft. Shortly thereafter, VMSB-231 was officially transferred back to Ewa, but a majority of its personnel and all of its aircraft remained at Midway.

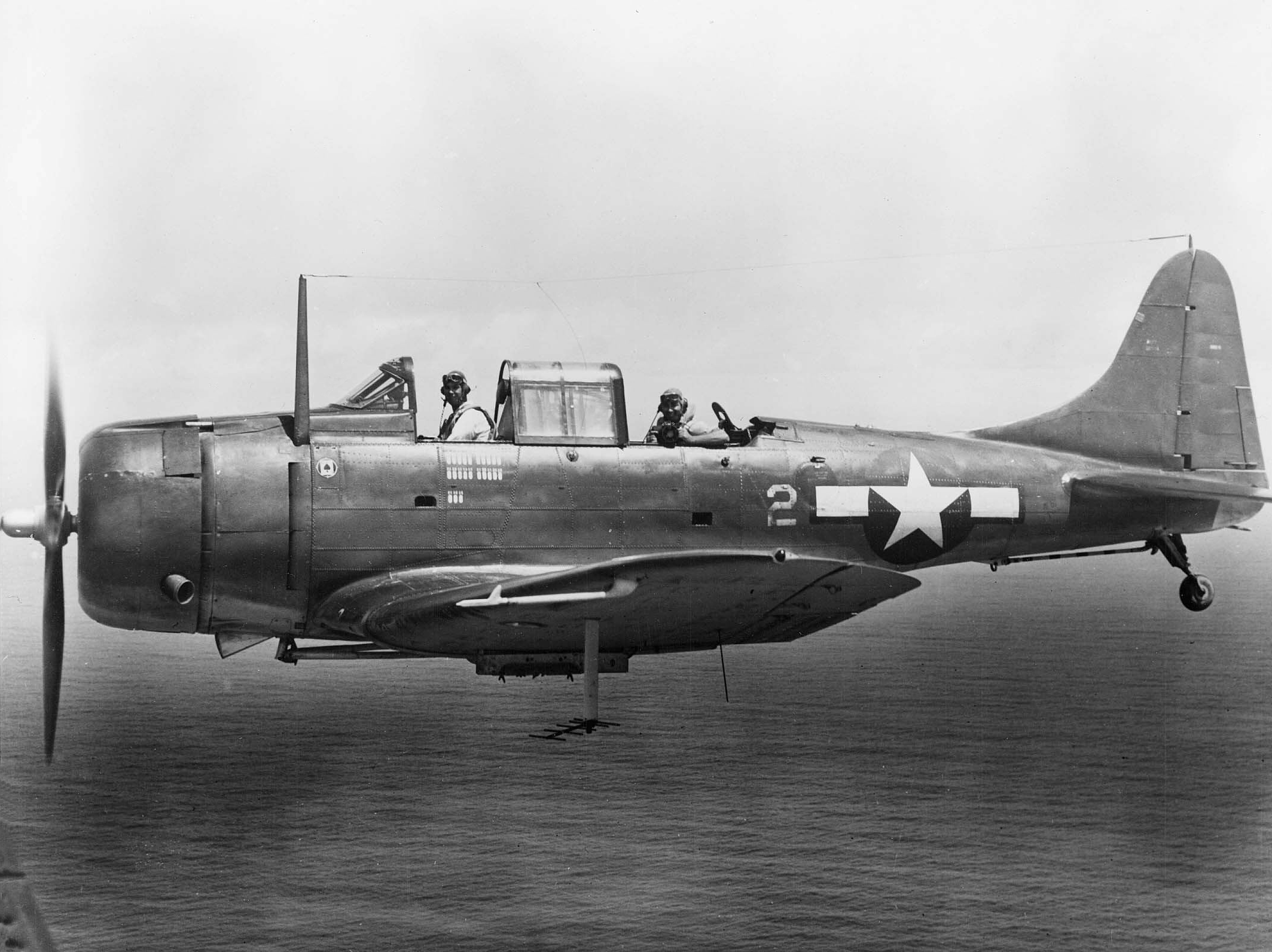
An SBD-5 Dauntless dive bomber of VMSB-231 during World War II. The pilot is Major Elmer P. Glidden

Reorganizing at MCAS Ewa, the squadron received Douglas SBD Dauntless dive bombers and was transferred to Marine Aircraft Group 23 (MAG-23). Slowly receiving new SBD-3 Dauntlesses and pilots, the squadron was notified in July 1942 that it would be deployed for duty overseas. Along with VMF-224, the squadron constituted the rear echelon of MAG-23 and was loaded aboard the aircraft transport USS Kitty Hawk (AKV-1) during the last week of August 1942 and shipped to the South Pacific. Arriving at Efate, the squadron spent the night there and the squadron's aircraft were craned over to the escort aircraft carrier USS Long Island (AVG-1). The next day, the SBDs were catapulted from the Long Island and flown to Espiritu Santo. After another night's layover, the flight echelon flew to Henderson Field on Guadalcanal on 30 August 1942, arriving right before the daily Japanese air raid on the field and becoming the second Marine dive bomber squadron to operate ashore Major Leo Smith, and Captains Ruben Iden and Elmer Glidden led the squadron during the stay on Guadalcanal. Captain Iden died in combat on 20 September 1942, a day after he assumed command. While on Guadalcanal, eleven of the squadron's twelve original SBDs were lost or rendered inoperable between 30 August – 3 October 1942. During this time Lieutenant Glen Loeffel was awarded the Navy Cross for heroism for his lone attack on the Japanese heavy cruiser Furutaka on 4 October 1942, causing substantial damage and leading to her eventual sinking on 11 October 1942. VMF-231 operated on Guadalcanal as part of the Cactus Air Force from 30 August until 2 November 1942. It then was shipped back to Naval Air Station San Diego, California, arriving there on 19 November 1942, and then moved further north to Marine Corps Air Station El Toro, California, in January 1943.

The squadron again deployed to the Pacific Theater and began operations bombing by-passed Japanese garrisons in the Marshall Islands on 4 February 1944. In October 1944, it was redesignated VMBF-231 and converted to the F4U Corsair fighter. Two months later, on 30 December 1944, it reverted to the name VMSB-231 and remained in the Marshalls until the surrender of Japan in August 1945. During the course of World War II the squadron was credited with downing seven Japanese aircraft in air-to-air combat.

=== Post-war years ===
Following World War II, the squadron was decommissioned in March 1946 while on board the USS Vella Gulf (CVE-111). The squadron's assets were absorbed by VMF(CVS)-214. The squadron was reactivated in the United States Marine Corps Reserve in September 1948 as VMF-231 in Akron, Ohio, and Grosse Ile Township, Michigan, until it was again decommissioned on 31 August 1962.

=== 1970s & 1980s ===
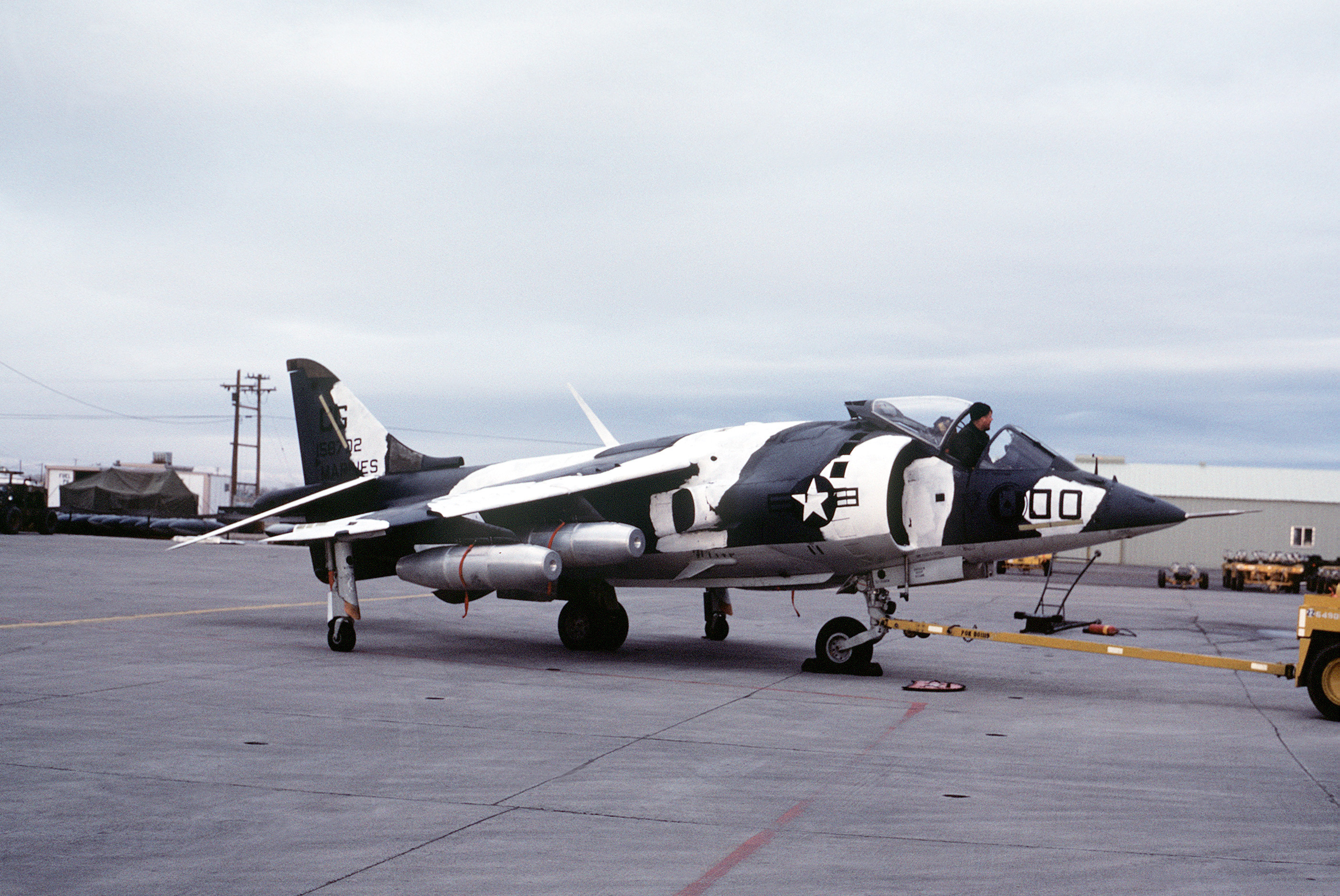
A Marine VMA-231 AV-8A with a camouflage paint during pre-flight operations. Harrier has two napalm bombs on its right wing.

VMA-231 was reactivated on May 15, 1973, and the Marine Corps' oldest squadron became the Corps' newest, flying the Corps' newest aircraft, the Hawker Siddeley AV-8A Harrier. The AV-8A was a high performance, high speed jet aircraft that was uniquely capable of vertical and short take off and landing (VSTOL).

4 October 1976 saw VMA-231 deploying to the Mediterranean aboard USS Franklin D. Roosevelt (CV-42) with Carrier Air Wing 19. VMA-231's journey included visits to Spain, Italy, Sicily, Kenya, and Egypt. Highlights of the cruise included a transit of the Suez Canal aboard USS Guam (LPH-9) and participation of VMA-231 in Kenya's Independence Day celebration by twelve AV-8A aircraft. VMA-231 rejoined the 2nd Marine Aircraft Wing on 20 April 1977, as the squadron safely returned to MCAS Cherry Point, North Carolina. Also in 1977, VMA-231 was named V/STOL Squadron of the Year, becoming the first recipient of this award.

=== The Gulf War & the 1990s ===
In June 1990 VMA-231 deployed to the Western Pacific as a squadron for the first time since World War II. Training continued at Iwakuni and Okinawa, Japan, as well as the Philippine Islands and Korea. Notably, the squadron weathered the July earthquake in Northern Luzon. Their deployment was extended when they received orders directing them to Southeast Asia in support of Operation Desert Shield. The move necessitated an unprecedented around-the-world trip as the Ace of Spades flew 18,000 NM in 14 days to join Marine Aircraft Group 13 (MAG-13) (forward). During the trip the squadron accrued 904 flight hours in December, a record for fleet Harrier squadrons.

On the morning of 17 January 1991, Operation Desert Storm began and VMA-231 was flying combat missions to silence Iraqi artillery batteries, which were indiscriminately shelling the Saudi Arabian border town of Khafji. On 9 February 1991, a newly promoted captain, pilot Russell A.C. Sanborn’s aircraft was shot down over the Iraqi-occupied Kuwaiti desert by a surface-to-air missile during a combat mission. With the uncontrollable jet hurtling inverted toward the sand, he ejected safely but was quickly captured by Iraqi troops. For 26 days, he was held in a small, dank and unsanitary cell and tortured by his captors until his release on 6 March 1991 when he was repatriated with fifteen other Americans.

During February 1991, when the air war intensified and the critical ground campaign began, Marine Attack Squadron 231 accumulated 966.2 hours. This monthly total is a United States Marine Corps Harrier record. The squadron flew a total of 987 combat sorties and 1,195.8 hours during the conflict. In total, 1,660 Mk-82s, 62 Mk-83s, 969 Mk-20 Rockeyes, 78 Mk-77 fire bombs, and 22,709 rounds of 25-millimeter munitions were expended. A grand total of 1,692,000 pounds of ammunition was delivered against enemy positions and equipment.

In September 1991, a six-plane detachment was sent out with HMH-362 aboard the amphibious assault ship USS Saipan (LHA-2) where it served as part of the 22nd Marine Expeditionary Unit in the Persian Gulf.

During November 1992, the squadron embarked on a two-site deployment by taking part of the squadron and fourteen jets to MCAS Iwakuni, Japan, and leaving six jets at MCAS Cherry Point, North Carolina, to support the 26th Marine Expeditionary Unit aboard the Saipan.

From February 1995 to August 1996, VMA-231 would participate with the 24th MEU aboard the amphibious assault ship USS Kearsarge (LHD-3) in rescuing downed United States Air Force pilot Captain Scott O'Grady and also with the 26th MEU aboard the amphibious assault ship USS Wasp (LHD-1) participating in Operation Deny Flight.

In April 1999, the squadron deployed with the 26th MEU on board the Kearsarge. They were involved in many operations, such as Operation Allied Force, bombing targets in the Federal Republic of Yugoslavia. They also participated in Operation Joint Guardian, Operation Shining Hope, and Operation Avid Response.

=== The Global War on Terror ===
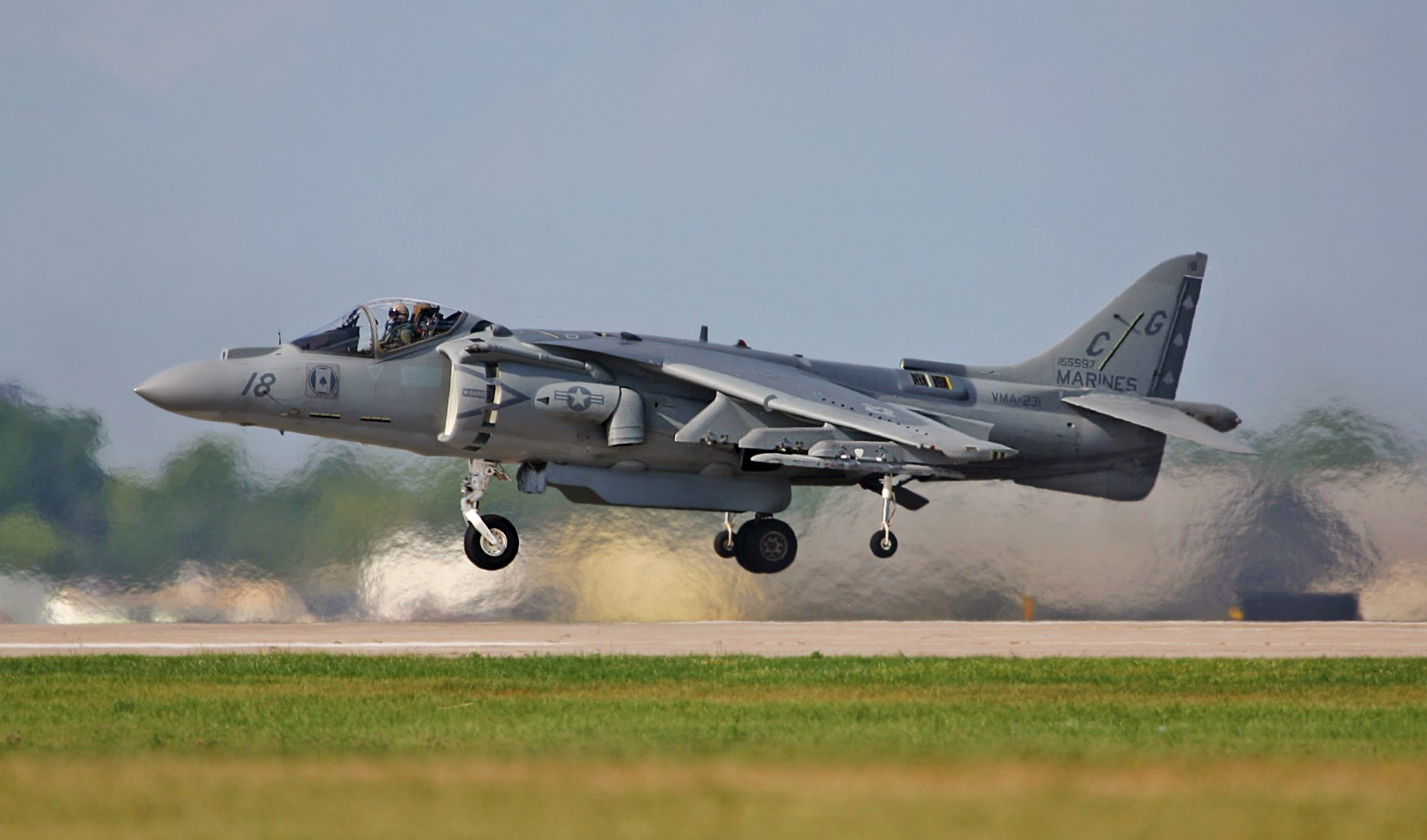
AV-8B Harrier II from VMA-231 landing in 2003

In April 2003 a detachment from the squadron took part in the invasion of Iraq as part of the 24th Marine Expeditionary Unit. In the spring of 2007 the squadron deployed to Al Asad Airbase again in support of Operation Iraqi Freedom. During this time, VMA-231 flew 1738 combat sorties totaling over 5158 flight hours.

In November 2009 the squadron deployed to Afghanistan in support of Operation Enduring Freedom (OEF). They were part of Marine Aircraft Group 14 and were based out of Kandahar International Airport flying close air support missions in support of the 2nd Marine Expeditionary Brigade (2nd MEB). They returned home in early summer 2010.

=== 2025–present: Harrier retirement and reactivation as VMFA-231 ===
VMA-231 held its final flight ceremony for the AV-8B Harrier II on May 29, 2025. VMA-231 was deactivated in September 2025 as one of the last AV-8B Harrier II squadrons in the U.S. Marine Corps.

The squadron was reactivated on 4 June 2026 as Marine Fighter Attack Squadron 231 (VMFA-231). On that date, VMFA-231 conducted its first flight with the F-35B Lightning II at Marine Corps Air Station Cherry Point, North Carolina, ahead of its official reactivation in the summer of 2026. The squadron is now operating the F-35B Lightning II Joint Strike Fighter as a fifth-generation fighter-attack unit.

== See also ==
- United States Marine Corps Aviation
- List of United States Marine Corps aircraft squadrons
