= VMO-6 =

Marine Observation Squadron 6
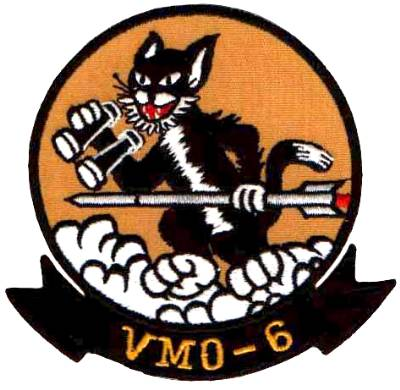
- VMO-6 insignia
- Active: 1 December 1920 – 30 June 1933; 20 November 1944 - 1 January 1977
- Country: United States
- Branch: USMC
- Type: Observation
- Role: Artillery spotting Aerial reconnaissance
- Size: Close air support
- Garrison/HQ: Inactive
- Nicknames: "Tomcats" "Cherry Six" "Klondike" "Seaworthy"
- Tail Code: WB
- Engagements: Banana Wars; Occupation of Nicaragua; World War II; Battle of Okinawa; Korean War; Battle of Pusan Perimeter; Battle of Inchon; Battle of Chosin Reservoir; Vietnam War; Battle of Khe Sahn; Operation Dewey Canyon

Commanders
- Notable commanders: Vernon M. Guymon; Hayne D. Boyden; Earl E. Anderson; William J. White

Marine Observation Squadron 6 (VMO-6) was an observation squadron of the United States Marine Corps which saw extensive action during the Battle of Okinawa in World War II and the Korean and Vietnam Wars. The squadron was the first Marine Corps helicopter squadron to participate in combat operations when it participated in the Battle of Pusan Perimeter in August 1950. The squadron was decommissioned on 1 January 1977.

== History ==
=== Early years ===
Flight E, 3d Air Squadron was commissioned on 1 December 1920 at Marine Corps Air Station Quantico, Virginia. The name of the squadron changed to Division 1, VF-1M on 24 August 1922 and again to Division 1, VO-3M on 1 September 1925. In 1927 they were re-designated Marine Observation Squadron 6 (VO-6M). In 1928, while flying the Curtiss F8C-1 Falcon they deployed aboard the USS Saratoga, from which they fought the Sandinistas in Nicaragua. During this time the Squadron also flew the Atlantic TA-1 and TA-2. In 1928 they returned to MCB Quantico where they took up the role of doing flight demonstrations for new officers at The Basic School.

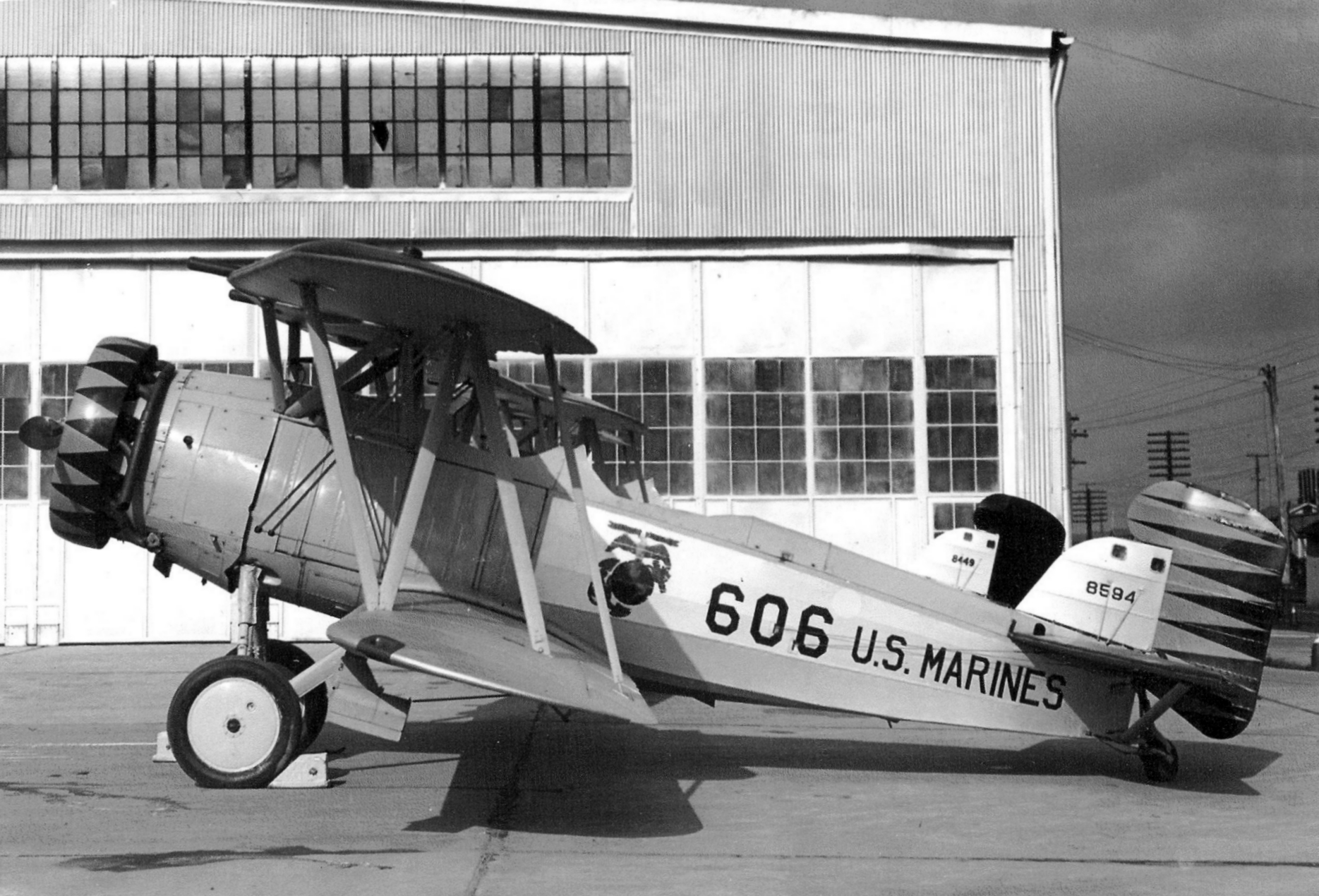
Curtiss O2C-1s flown by VO-6M in the early 1930s.

During the 1930s VO-6M flew the Vought Vought 02U-1 and the Curtiss F8C-5 Helldiver. Calling themselves the "Helldivers", in 1932 they were representing the Marine Corps at major events such as the Canadian Air Pageant and the US National Air Races in Cleveland, Ohio. During this time the Marines took on the mission of defending advanced naval bases and the Commandant of the Marine Corps recommended a light bombing squadron be activated in 1934. This required the deactivation of an observation squadron so VMO-6 was deactivated on 30 June 1933.

=== World War II ===
The squadron was reactivated on 20 November 1944 at MCB Quantico flying the OY-1 aircraft. They were then transferred to Marine Corps Air Station Camp Pendleton, California where they began training for future combat operations with the 6th Marine Division. In January 1945, the squadron departed for Guadalcanal as part of the 15th Marines, the artillery regiment of the 6th Marine Division.

On 1 April 1945, VMO-6 came ashore during the Battle of Okinawa and commenced operations from Yomitan Airstrip. VMO-6 flew its OY-1 aircraft on a variety of missions, including artillery spotting, message pickups, photo reconnaissance and medical evacuations in litter equipped OY-ones. In July 1945, the squadron departed for Agaña, Guam where it remained until the end of the war. In October 1945, VMO-6 was deployed to Tientsin, China to participate in the occupation and because of the increase in communist activity. The squadron served in a variety of liaison roles and flew very dangerous missions often under intense ground fire from the communist forces. They finally left China on 3 January 1947 and returned to MCB Pendleton.

=== Korean War ===
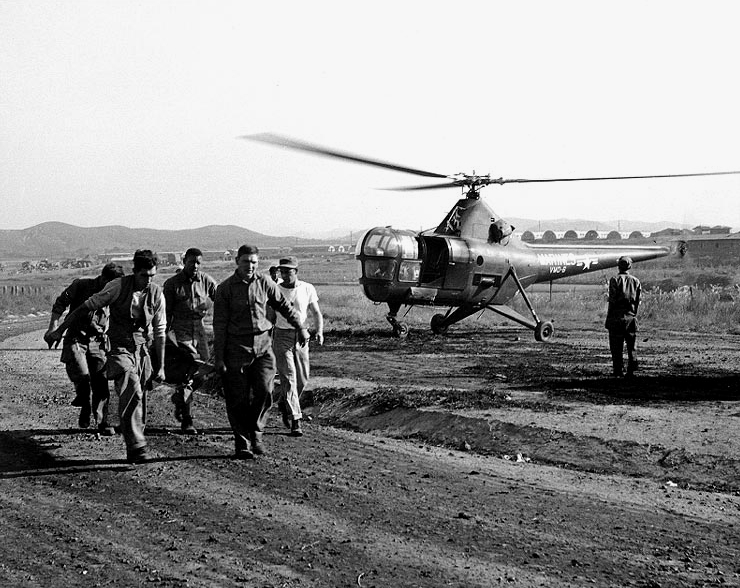
Navy Corpsmen help carry a wounded man from a VMO-6 HO3S-1 helicopter to a hospital in Korea in October 1950.

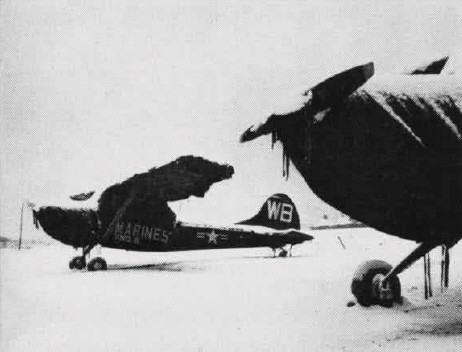
VMO-6 L-19s during the winter 1951/52 in Korea

In August 1950, HO3S-1 helicopters and pilots from HMX-1 at MCAF Quantico, Virginia joined the squadron's eight OY-2 Sentinels and VMO-6 departed the United States in July 1950 as part of Marine Aircraft Group 33. They arrived in Jinhae, Korea on 2 August and immediately began to fly during the Battle of Pusan Perimeter becoming the first helicopter squadron in the Marine Corps to participate in combat operations The OY-2's were flown as convoy escorts for the 1st Marine Brigade in addition to observation and reconnaissance missions. They proved so successful that it became regular procedure to have an OY over the brigade at all times during daylight hours. In August 1950 the squadron, carried its first medevac and these missions became routine for VMO-6 pilots and crewmen. On 27 November 1950, Chinese encircled the 1st Marine Division at the Battle of Chosin Reservoir. For the first four days of the battle, until an expeditionary airfield was completed at Hagaru-ri on 1 December, helicopters from VMO-6 were the only aircraft able to evacuate the wounded taking 152 injured south to Hungnam. The next ten days would see them evacuate a further 538 aided by modified TBM Avengers that belonged to the Division. During the Korean War, the squadron conducted 22,367 missions and flew 7,067 wounded Marines to safety. After the signing of the Korean Armistice Agreement the squadron returned to MCB Camp Pendleton in June 1955. In 1951, the squadron replaced the HO3S-1 with the HTL-4.

=== Cold War ===
On 20 March 1956 VMO-6 became the first Marine Corps squadron to receive the HOK-1 helicopter.

=== Vietnam War ===
In 1964 the squadron received it first UH-1E Iroquois. In August 1965 VMO-6 departed as part of Marine Aircraft Group 36 on board the USS Princeton for South Vietnam. On 1 September 1965 the squadron began operating from Chu Lai. After training by the Army, the Hueys were converted to primarily a gunship role and the majority of the UH-1's missions were providing close air support to infantry and recon units. They participated in the following operations while operating from there: Quang Ngai, Double Eagle, Blue Marlin and Duc Pho. While providing support to Marines at the Battle of Hill 488 on the night of 15 June 1966, the squadron's new commanding officer, Major William J. Goodsell, was killed when his UH-1E was shot down. In October 1967 the squadron moved to just south of Huế to Phu Bai. A month later another move took them to Quảng Trị Combat Base. July 1968 saw the squadron get its first fixed wing aircraft since World War II when they took possession of a few Cessna O-1C & 0-1G Birddogs that were used for directing artillery and air strikes. These were followed in October 1968 when the first contingent of six OV-10A Broncos joined VMO-6 at Marble Mountain Air Facility. They began operating within 18 hours of joining the squadron at Quảng Trị. The squadron flew in support of Marines at Khe Sanh, Con Thien, Lao Bảo, Đông Hà, Gio Linh, The Rockpile, Vandegrift Combat Base, the Ben Hai and Firebase Argonne. They flew in support of the following operations: Maine Crag, Apache Snow, Scotland II, Montana Mauler, Napoleon-Saline, Lancaster II, Rice, Kentucky, Purple Martin, Idaho Canyon and many more. Their biggest action came during Operation Dewey Canyon from 22 January – 18 March 1969 where the Marines sought to engage Communist forces near the Laotian border. All three of the squadron's aircraft were involved with the Hueys providing gun support for 3rd Force Recon, escorting insertion, extraction, supply and MEDEVAC missions and the two fixed wing squadrons doing aerial reconnaissance, artillery spotting and forward air controlling from the air.

=== Final years ===
In October 1969 VMO-6 departed South Vietnam for its new home at Marine Corps Air Station Futenma, Okinawa. From there they participated in exercises from such places as Cubi Point in the Philippines, Atsugi, Japan; Taegu, Korea; and the Republic of China.

The squadron was decommissioned on 1 January 1977.

== Notable former members ==
- Stephen W. Pless - recipient of the Medal of Honor
- Ed McMahon - co-host The Tonight Show Starring Johnny Carson
- John Beal - composer

== Unit awards ==
A unit citation or commendation is an award bestowed upon an organization for the action cited. Members of the unit who participated in said actions are allowed to wear on their uniforms the awarded unit citation. VMO-6 was presented with the following awards:

Ribbon	Unit Award
	Presidential Unit Citation (Navy) with four bronze stars
	Presidential Unit Citation (Army)
	Navy Unit Commendation with two bronze stars
	Meritorious Unit Commendation
	Second Nicaraguan Campaign Medal
	Asiatic-Pacific Campaign Medal with one bronze star
	World War II Victory Medal
	China Service Medal
	Korean Service Medal with two silver stars
	National Defense Service Medal with one bronze star
	Armed Forces Expeditionary Medal
	Vietnam Service Medal with two silver stars
	Korean Presidential Unit Citation
	Vietnam Gallantry Cross with Palm
	Vietnam Meritorious Unit Citation Civil Action Medal with Palm

== See also ==
- United States Marine Corps Aviation
- List of active United States Marine Corps aircraft squadrons
- List of decommissioned United States Marine Corps aircraft squadrons

== Bibliography ==
- Ballentine, David A. Gunbird Driver: A Marine Huey Pilot's War in Vietnam. Naval Institute Press, 2008. ISBN 1-59114-019-6 .
- Barrow, Jess C. WW II: Marine Fighting Squadron Nine (VF-9M). Blue Ridge Summit, Pennsylvania: TAB Books Inc., 1981. ISBN 0-8306-2289-6.
- Boden, John. Klondike Playboy. Xlibris, 2010. ISBN 978-1-4535-2672-9.
- Chapin, John C. Fire Brigade: U.S. Marines in the Pusan Perimeter. Washington, D.C.: Marine Corps Historical Center, 2000.
- Mersky, Peter B. U.S. Marine Corps Aviation - 1912 to the Present. Nautical and Aviation Publishing Company of America, 1983. ISBN 0-933852-39-8.
- Mersky, Peter B. and Norman Polmar. The Naval Air War in Vietnam. Nautical and Aviation Publishing Company of America, 1981.
- Montross, Lynn. Cavalry of the Sky - The Story of U.S. Marine Combat Helicopters. New York: Harper & Brothers, 1954.
- Parker, LtCol Gary W., USMC and Major Frank M. Batha, USMC (Retd.). A History of Marine Observation Squadron Six. Washington, D.C.: History and Museums Division, Headquarters, U.S. Marine Corps, 1982. PCN 190-003087-00.
- Rawlins, Eugene W. Marines and Helicopters 1946 - 1962. History and Museums Division Headquarters USMC, 1976.
- Rottman, Gordon L. U.S. Marine Corps World War II Order of Battle - Ground and Air Units in the Pacific War, 1939 - 1945. Greenwood Press, 2002. ISBN 0-313-31906-5.
- Sherrod, Robert. History of Marine Corps Aviation in World War II. Washington, D.C.: Combat Forces Press, 1952.
