= William J. White (general) =

United States Marine Corps general

William James White
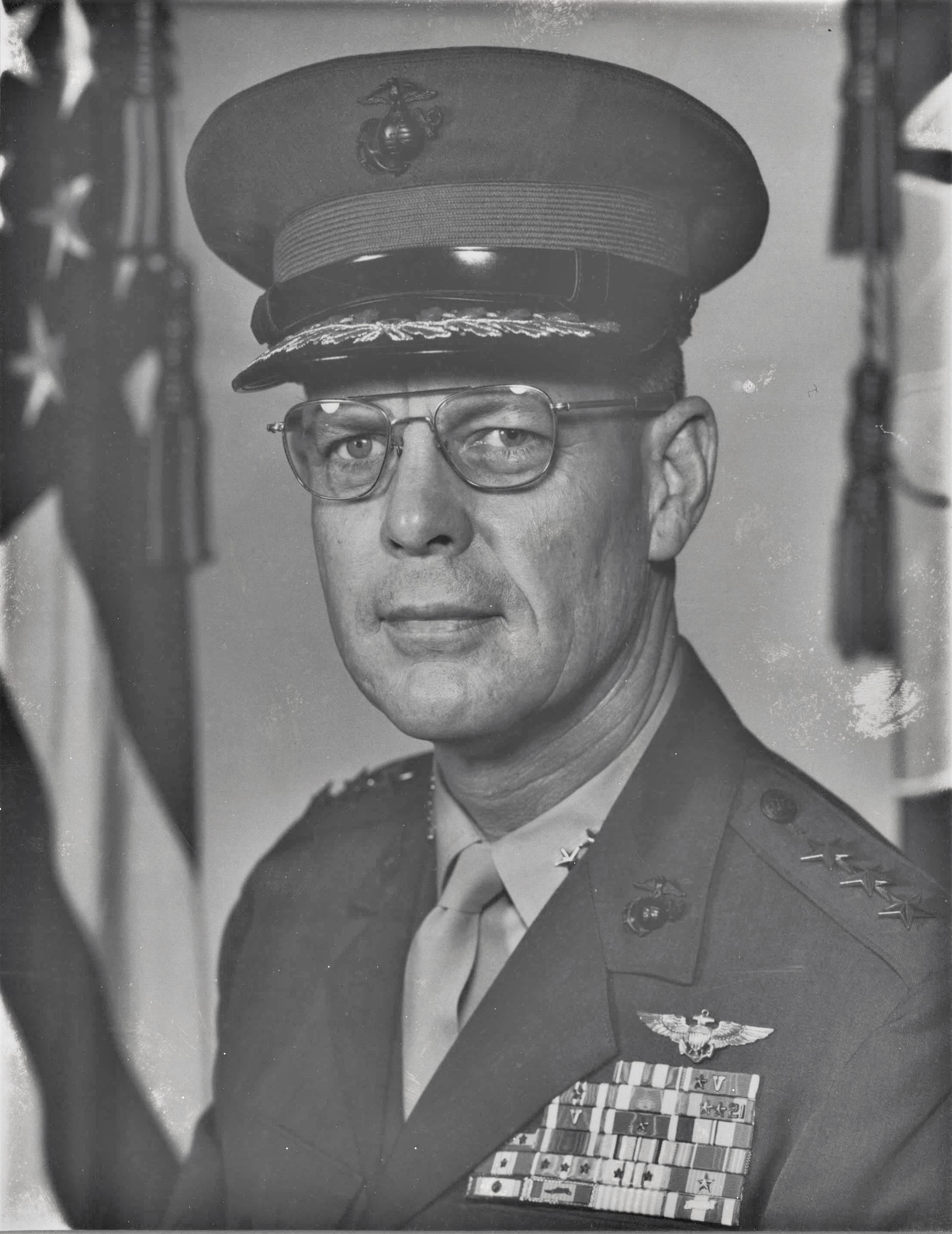
- LtGen William J. White
- Born: March 24, 1925; New York City, New York, U.S.
- Died: November 22, 2017 (aged 92); Alexandria, Virginia, U.S.
- Burial place: Princeton, Kentucky
- Military career
- Allegiance: United States of America
- Branch: United States Marine Corps
- Service years: 1943–1982
- Rank: Lieutenant general
- Service number: 0-49174
- Commands: 4th Marine Aircraft Wing; 1st Marine Aircraft Wing; MCAS Kaneohe Bay; VMO-6
- Conflicts: World War II; Korean War; Vietnam War
- Awards: Silver Star; Legion of Merit (2); Distinguished Flying Cross (2); Air Medal (23); Purple Heart (2)

William James White (March 24, 1925 – November 22, 2017) was a decorated lieutenant general in the United States Marine Corps. He was awarded the Silver Star, the United States military's third-highest personal decoration for valor in combat, for his actions in the Korean War. He later served as deputy chief of staff for aviation at Headquarters Marine Corps.

== Biography ==
William J. White was born on March 24, 1925, in New York City, New York, the son of Eleanor and John White. Following graduation from high school, White enlisted in the Marine Corps on June 25, 1943. He was attached to the Naval Aviation Pilot Training Program and successfully graduated from the program on November 1, 1946, and was commissioned second lieutenant in the Marine Corps on the same date.

During the Korean War, White served as first lieutenant with the Marine Observation Squadron 6 (VMO-6), of 1st Marine Aircraft Wing and received the Silver Star for gallantry in combat on May 4, 1952. He piloted a tactical air observer on a patrol mission deep in enemy territory and skillfully maneuvered his slow, unarmed aircraft dangerously close to hostile mortar positions, which were inflicting casualties on the patrol, in an effort to distract the enemy and allow the observer to call in counterfire from friendly mortars. Aware that the patrol was still suffering casualties, he requested air support and guided the planes to the area by radio. Braving intense enemy machine gun fire, he carried out repeated passes at extremely low altitude to mark the enemy positions with smoke grenades and continued to control the air strike within range of heavy enemy fire, thereby greatly aiding in the complete destruction of the hostile positions and in the successful resumption of the patrol.

He later received his first Distinguished Flying Cross during the action in Korea. White was promoted to the rank of major on July 1, 1957, and later served at Headquarters Marine Corps in Washington, D.C. While served there, he received a Bachelor of Science from the University of Maryland and a Master of Science in International Affairs at George Washington University.

During the Vietnam War, White served as a lieutenant colonel and commanding officer of Marine Observation Squadron 6 (VMO-6) from September 1967 and assisted in the resupply and evacuation of wounded of the Marine forces during the Siege of Khe Sanh. Beginning in February, he and other helicopter pilots in his squadron conceptualized and participated in the implementation of an air strategy known as the "super gaggle". He was gravely wounded in a Viet Cong mortar attack on the night of his 43rd birthday, losing an eye, earning his second Purple Heart, and ending his time as a fully qualified naval aviator. He returned to the States in March 1968 and received the Legion of Merit with Combat "V" and a second Distinguished Flying Cross for his service in Vietnam.

White was promoted to the rank of colonel on July 1, 1969, and later served as commanding officer of Marine Corps Air Station Kaneohe Bay, Hawaii. He distinguished himself again and received his second Legion of Merit in 1973.

Following his promotion to the rank of brigadier general, White served as deputy commander, 1st Marine Aircraft Wing and later as acting wing commander in January 1976. He was appointed Commanding general, 4th Marine Aircraft Wing with additional duty as Commander of Marine Air Reserve Training Command with headquarters in New Orleans, Louisiana in June 1976 and served in that capacity until March 1978, when he assumed duty as Director of operations for the Commander-in-Chief, United States Pacific Fleet under Admiral Thomas B. Hayward.

He rose to the rank of lieutenant general and served as Deputy Chief of Staff (Aviation) at Headquarters Marine Corps under Commandant Robert H. Barrow until his retirement in 1982. As DCS/Air, he championed the Marine Corps AV-8A Harrier and MV-22 Osprey programs.

After his retirement from the Marine Corps, White worked for next 23 years as a consultant in the aviation field for Burdeshaw Associates, LLC, and lived in the Belle Haven neighborhood in Alexandria, Virginia.

He died on November 22, 2017, at Walter Reed National Medical Center after a short battle with acute lymphoblastic leukemia. General White is buried at Cedar Hill Cemetery, Princeton, Kentucky, with his wife Klondean Pickering White. They had three daughters: Cynthia Hesel, Sandra Holcombe and Elizabeth Mahmassani, four grandchildren and three great-grandchildren.
