= Order of Naval Merit (Cuba) =

Ribbon of the order

The Cuban Order of Naval Merit (Spanish: Orden cubana al mérito naval; First Class) was a medal of special merit. The Cuban Order of Naval Merit was a state order of chivalry or merit. Its medals, awarded by the Cuban government from the 1920s through the 1950s, were made by the Cuban firm Dator Plus Altra and were made of sterling silver and enamel.

== Notable U.S. Recipients ==
- Hayne D. Boyden, Brigadier general (USMC)
- William Halsey, Jr., Fleet Admiral (United States)
- Thomas Holcomb, General & Commandant (USMC)
- James L. Kauffman, Vice Admiral (USN)
- Ernest King, Fleet Admiral (USN)
- Richard R. McNulty, Rear Admiral (USN)
- Pedro del Valle Lieutenant General (USMC)

== See also ==
- Orders, decorations, and medals of Cuba
