= Ross E. Rowell =

United States Marine Corps aviator and lieutenant general (1884–1947)

LtGen. Ross E. Rowell
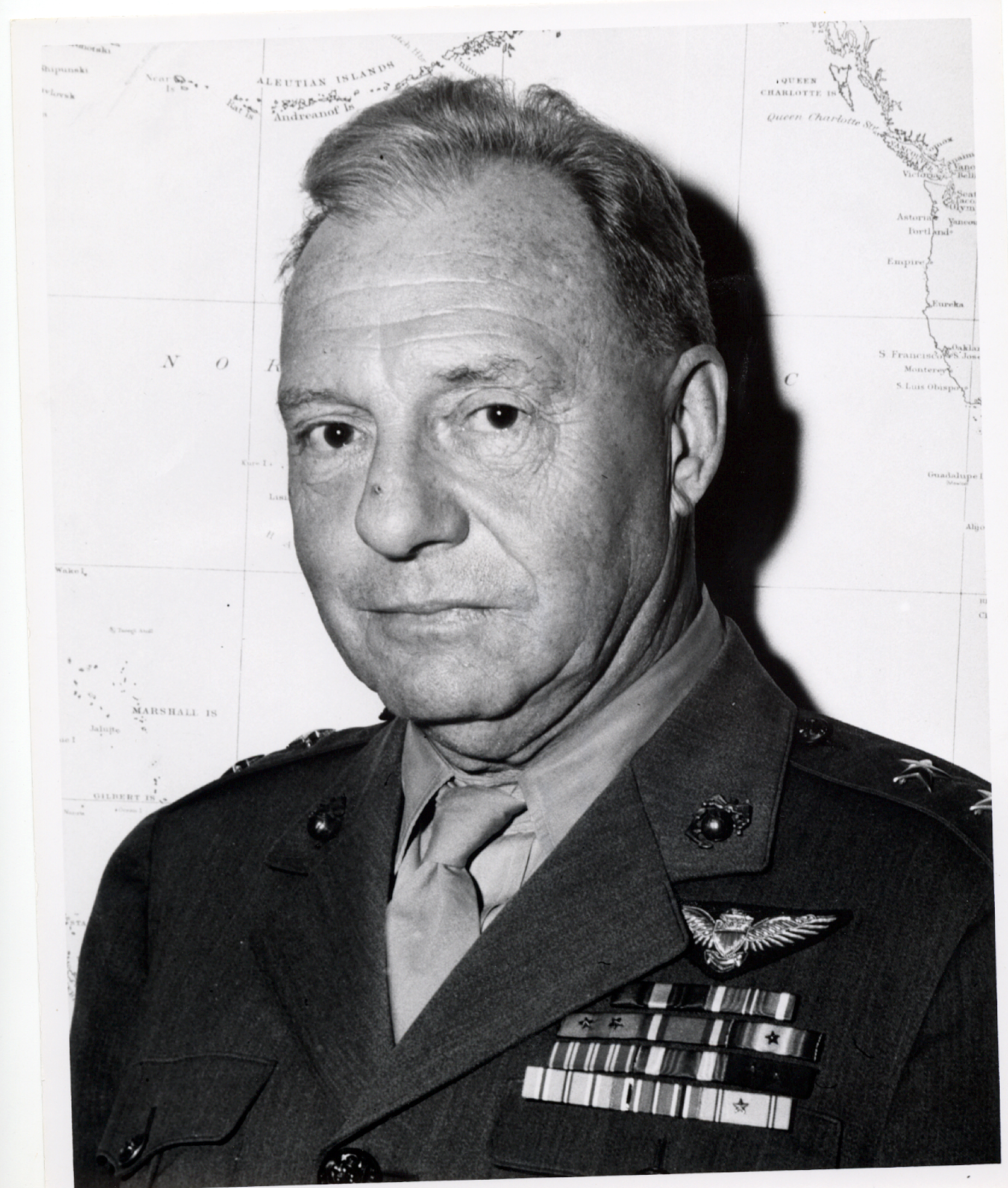
- Born: Ross Erastus Rowell; September 22, 1884; Ruthven, Iowa, U.S.
- Died: September 6, 1947 (aged 62); San Diego, California, U.S.
- Burial place: Arlington National Cemetery
- Military career
- Allegiance: United States of America
- Branch: United States Marine Corps
- Service years: 1906–1946
- Rank: Lieutenant general
- Nickname: "Rusty"
- Commands: VO-1M; 2nd Marine Aircraft Wing; Marine Corps Aviation
- Conflicts: Banana Wars: Occupation of Cuba; Occupation of Nicaragua; Battle of Ocotal; World War II
- Awards: Distinguished Service Medal; Distinguished Flying Cross; Legion of Merit

Ross Erastus Rowell (September 22, 1884 – September 6, 1947) was a highly decorated United States Marine Corps aviator who served as the Marine Corps' Director of Aviation from May 30, 1935, until March 10, 1939, and was one of the three senior officers of Marine Corps Aviation during World War II. He achieved the rank of lieutenant general by the end of his 40 years of service.

== Biography ==
=== Early years ===
Ross Erastus Rowell was born on September 22, 1884, in Ruthven, Iowa, attending grade and high school in Ruthven. He was graduated from Iowa State College and then studied electrical engineering for two years at the University of Idaho. He then worked for two years as topographer and draftsman for the U.S. Geological Survey at Snake River Valley, Idaho.

=== Early military career ===
He was appointed as a second lieutenant in the Marine Corps in August 1906. He served in Cuba from 1906 until 1909. Rowell was designated a student naval aviator in 1923, taking his fight training at Naval Air Station Pensacola, Florida and at Kelly Field in San Antonio, Texas. General Rowell was commended by the Secretary of the Navy for making the highest bombing score during the gunnery year 1924–25, and in 1926 he was praised by the Commandant of the Marine Corps for the high state of efficiency prevailing at Naval Air Station San Diego, California, where he then was group commander.

In early 1927, Rowell as commander of the squadron VO-1M, deployed to Nicaragua as part of the United States occupation during this time referred to as the Banana Wars. They arrived at the port of Corinto on February 25 and proceeded to Managua where they began training and flying in support of their fellow Marines on the ground.

On July 16, 1927, a 37-man Marine garrison in Ocotal was surrounded by several hundred sandinistas led by Augusto César Sandino. Upon getting news of the attack, then Major Rowell, flew a 5 plane detachment of DHs to help relieve the garrison. The dive-bombing runs from low altitude made by Rowell and his men marked one of the first coordinated dive-bombing attacks in aviation history. Rowell was awarded the Distinguished Flying Cross and the Navy Distinguished Service Medal for his extraordinary heroism and exceptionally meritorious service in action against hostile Nicaraguan bandits during this time.

On May 30, 1932, Rowell took command of the East Coast Expeditionary Force at Marine Corps Air Station Quantico, Virginia. His air command won the Schiff Trophy in 1926, 1932, and again in 1933. He led the Marine Air Detachment at the International Air Races at Chicago in September, 1933, and in the All-American Air Races at Miami, Florida, in January 1935, achieving commendable performances on both occasions.

He served as director of Marine Corps Aviation from May 30, 1935, through March 10, 1939. In this role he was the senior advisor to the commandant on all aviation matters and the Marine Corps' liaison with the Navy's Bureau of Aeronautics.

In addition to duty at various posts in the United States and extensive sea duty, Rowell served abroad in the Philippine Islands, France, Haiti, Puerto Rico and the Dominican Republic.

=== World War II ===
Early in World War II, Rowell was sent to London as an Air Attaché for duty in Cairo, Egypt. It was in the desert and in the skies over Great Britain that he was able to see the advent of fighters equipped to operate at night. He also traveled and learned all he could about RAF Coastal Command in Scotland and RAF Bomber Command in Buckinghamshire, England. Upon his return in November 1941, Rowell made a recommendation for the Marine Corps to acquire a medium-sized, long range, high-speed bomber to be used for night harassing missions. This coupled with the work of other Marines grew into the Marine PBJ night bomber program.

Following these tours, Rowell served as commanding general, Marine Aircraft Wings, Pacific (MAWP), from the opening of the Guadalcanal Campaign in August 1942 until Japanese air power was driven from the Bismarck-Solomons in 1944. MAWP was based at Marine Corps Air Station Ewa, Hawaii and its mission was to organize, administrate and distribute personnel and supplies for Marine Air Wings in the Pacific.

On December 27, 1942, Rowell read a dispatch from Admiral Halsey on Guadalcanal speaking to the negative effects that night time raids from Japanese bombers were having on the ground troops. Based on his earlier travels and observations, Rowell immediately recommended that a night fighter unit be made "available immediately for overseas duty". This message to Marine Headquarters in Washington was the catalyst for kicking the development of Marine Night Fighters into high gear.

It was during this time that Admiral Ernest King convinced Rowell that there was no longer a need for Marines to get carrier qualifications, since all of their aircraft were currently based out of land based strips. This lack of foresight led to Marine pilots not being able to fly from escort carriers, which were providing the close air support during amphibious landings. This returned to haunt the Marine Corps during the Mariana and Palau Islands campaign in which it was generally felt that close air support provided by pilots from the United States Navy left much to be desired. The lack of adequate air support was coupled with the feeling amongst other senior Marine aviators such as Roy Geiger and then Commandant Alexander Vandegrift that Marine aviation was not paying attention to its primary purpose of providing close air support, and was too concerned with shooting down enemy aircraft.

In August 1944, General Vandegrift flew to Hawaii to meet with Admiral Nimitz and his staff and came up with the solution that Marine squadrons would be assigned to escort carriers. Marine aviation would take control of aircraft directly supporting ground troops during amphibious operations and the Marine Air Wing Pacific would be renamed Aircraft, Fleet Marine Force, Pacific(AirFMFPac). This new role was not welcomed by Rowell. He became so negative that he was quickly replaced by MajGen Francis P. Mulcahy in October 1944 and reassigned as the Chief of the Naval Aviation Mission to Peru, a post he held until his retirement in November 1946. In September 1944, he was awarded the Legion of Merit for outstanding service as commanding general, Marine Aircraft Wings Pacific from August 1942 to September 1944.

Rowell retired from the Marine Corps after 40 years of service on November 1, 1946. He died at the Naval Hospital in San Diego on September 6, 1947. He is buried in Arlington National Cemetery.

== Dates of rank ==
Rowell's dates of rank are:

date	rank	image
1906 August	2nd lieutenant	
1908 November	First Lieutenant	
1914 September	Captain	
1917 October	Major	
1932 August	Lieutenant colonel	
1935 June	Colonel	
1939 December	Brigadier general	
1942 January	Major general	

== Decorations ==

Naval Aviator Badge
1st Row	Navy Distinguished Service Medal			
2nd Row	Legion of Merit	Distinguished Flying Cross	Marine Corps Expeditionary Medal w/ 2 service stars	Cuban Pacification Medal
3rd Row	World War I Victory Medal w/ West Indies clasp	Nicaraguan Campaign Medal (1933)	American Defense Service Medal w/ 1 service star	American Campaign Medal
4th Row	Asiatic-Pacific Campaign Medal with three service stars	World War II Victory Medal	Nicaraguan Medal of Merit	Nicaraguan Medal of Distinction w/ Diploma

== See also ==
- Alfred A. Cunningham, first Marine Corps aviator and first director of Marine Corps Aviation

Military offices
Preceded by Roy S. Geiger	Director of Aviation; May 30, 1935 – March 10, 1939	Succeeded by Ralph J. Mitchell
