= Battle of Ocotal =

1927 event of the American occupation of Nicaragua

Coordinates: 13°38′N 86°29′W

- Part of the Occupation of Nicaragua, Banana Wars
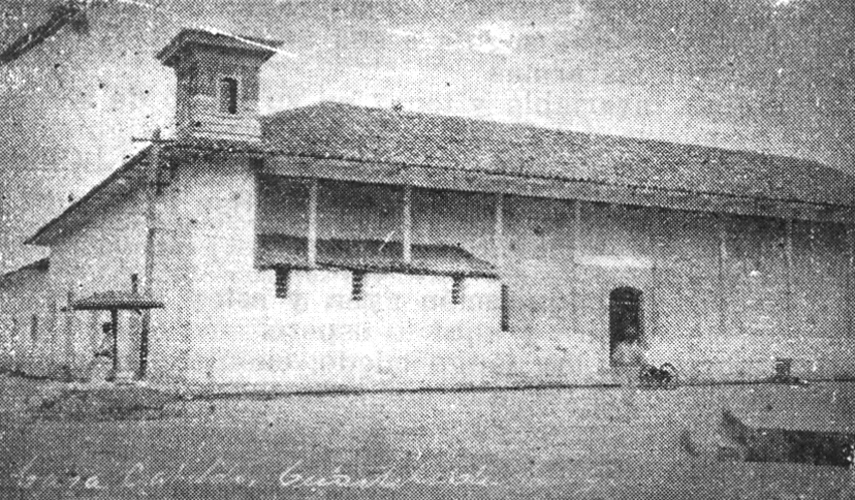
- Fort Ocotal, held by marines during the occupation of Nicaragua
Date	16 July 1927
Location	Ocotal, Nicaragua
Result	American-Nicaraguan victory

Belligerents
United States; Nicaragua	Sandinistas

Commanders and leaders
(United States) Maj. Ross E. Rowell (United States) Cap. Gilbert Hatfield (Nicaragua) Grover C. Darnall (Nicaragua) Thomas G. Bruce	Augusto César Sandino; Rufo Marín †; Porfirio Sánchez

Strength
37 US Marines; 47 Nicaraguan National Guards; 7 aircraft	500–600 guerrillas

Casualties and losses
9 killed & wounded (according to Beckett); 1 killed 5 wounded (according to Nalty)	40–80 killed (according to Beckett); 56 killed 100 wounded (according to Nalty)

The Battle of Ocotal occurred in July 1927, during the United States occupation of Nicaragua. A large force of rebels loyal to Augusto César Sandino attacked Ocotal in Nueva Segovia Department, which was held by a small group of US Marines and Nicaraguan National Guards (Guardia Nacional). Ultimately the rebels were defeated with heavy losses, while the Americans and their Nicaraguan allies suffered very light casualties.

== Battle ==
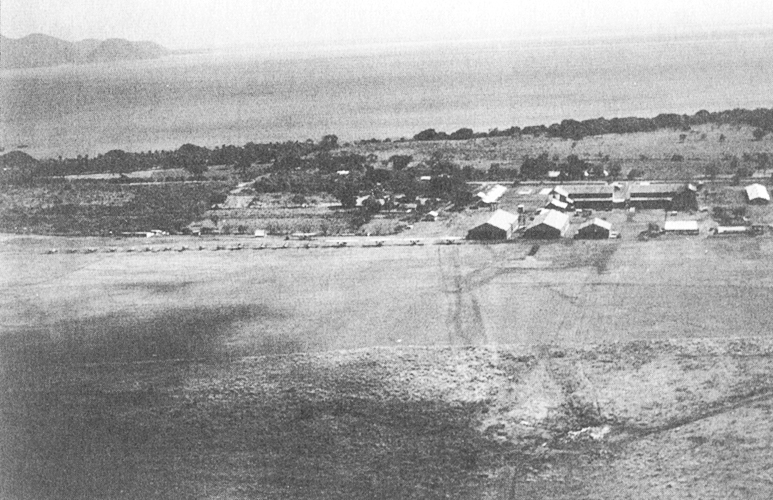
Marine Corps airbase at Managua

Eight US Marines were stationed at Ocotal. By June 1927, this force had been reinforced to 41 men under Captain Gilbert D. Hatfield, tasked to patrol Nueva Segovia, and on July 11, by 47 men of the 1st Company of the Guardia Nacional. Upon arriving at the town of Ocotal, Captain Hatfield expected enemy activity so he had his men build an airstrip and establish telegraph service with the surrounding town.

The Marines and the National Guards did not have to wait long for a battle. On July 15, Captain Hatfield doubled his watch and that same night, Sandino's rebels began entering the town, two or three men at a time. At 1:15 am on July 16, a lone Marine patrolling the town spotted a suspicious man walking along a street, so he fired what became the first shot of the engagement.

With the element of surprise lost, Sandino immediately ordered his men to attack the Marines and Guards. Around 4 AM, the rebels assaulted the city hall three times, resulting in the death of Rufo Marin. The second push lasted more than four hours. At daybreak, heavy fighting began again until 8 AM, when Sandino demanded Hatfield's surrender. Hatfield refused, apparently believing that his fortified positions were strong enough to repel any further attack.

Daylight brought two Marine aircraft into the battle, piloted by Lieutenant Hayne D. Boyden and Gunner Michael Wodarczyk. At around 10 AM, Boyden landed near Ocotal to learn what was happening, while Wodarczyk strafed rebel positions. Boyden then took off, made a few more strafing runs, and flew back to Managua, where he informed Major Ross E. Rowell of the battle.

Major Rowell responded by forming a squadron of five De Havilland DH-4 biplanes armed with machine guns and four 25-pound bombs each. At 2 PM, Rowell's squadron arrived at Ocotal, and dropped bombs on the rebels from 300 to 1,000 feet for about forty-five minutes. Sandino's men, who had never been attacked by aircraft before, began a panic retreat in what was history's first dive bombing attack in tactical support of ground troops.

== Aftermath ==
Fifty-six dead rebels were collected and over 100 more were wounded, while the Marines and National Guards suffered only light casualties. The exact casualties suffered by the victors vary between accounts: Nalty stated only one man killed and five wounded, while Beckett stated a total of nine killed and wounded.

While this action was by no means the end of the insurgency – it was to last another five years – it was the last time that the rebels attempted to concentrate for a massed attack of this kind. As with early British successes with aircraft in Somaliland in 1920, aerial attack had forced the insurgents to change their tactics.

Major Oliver Floyd's Nueva Segovia expedition soon arrived in Ocotal, and on 25 July, marched for San Fernando.

== See also ==
- Banana Wars
- Chesty Puller

== Bibliography ==
- Beckett, I. F. W., ed. (1988). The Roots of Counter-Insurgency. London: Blandford Press. ISBN 0-7137-1922-2.
- Nalty, Bernard C. (1968). The United States Marines in Nicaragua. Washington DC: US Marines Historical Branch.
