= Camp Leatherneck =

Afghan Armed Forces base in Helmand Province, Afghanistan

- Gereshk District in Afghanistan
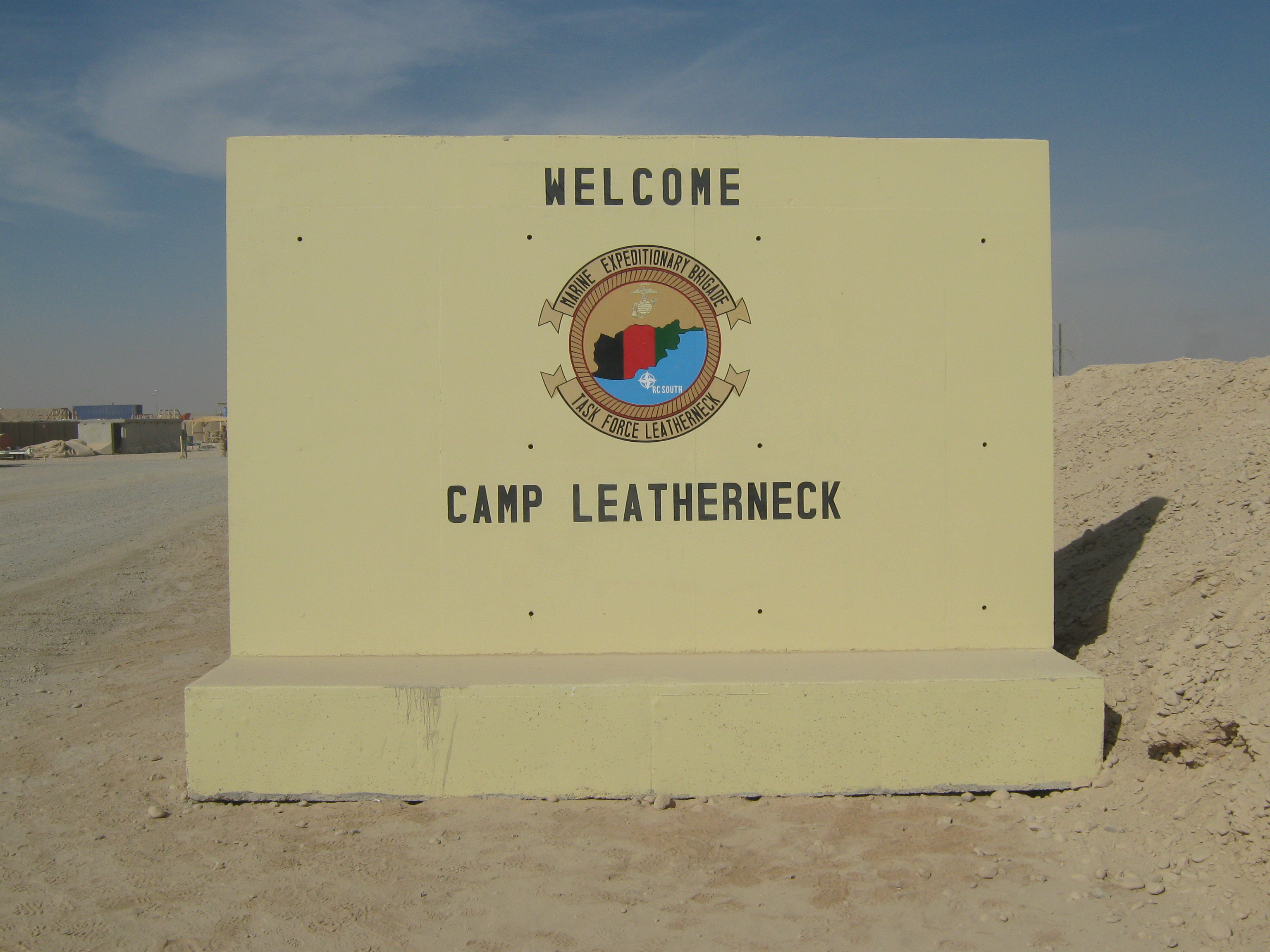
- Original Camp Leatherneck sign at entrance

Site information
- Type: Camp
- Owner: Islamic Emirate of Afghanistan
- Operator: Afghan Ministry of Defense

Location
- Shown within Afghanistan
- Coordinates: 31°51′50″N 064°12′29″E

Site history
- Built: 2008
- In use: 2008 – 2014
- Battles/wars: Operation Strike of the Sword

Camp Leatherneck was a 1,600 acre United States Marine Corps base in Helmand Province, Afghanistan. The site was mostly in Washir District and was conjoined with Camp Bastion, which was the main British military base in Afghanistan and Camp Shorabak which initially was the main Afghan section however the three sites were joined under the name of 'Camp Shorabak' in 2014.

Control of the site was transferred from the International Security Assistance Force (ISAF) to the Afghan Armed Forces on 26 October 2014.

== History ==
Camp Leatherneck was master-planned by the United States Army Corps of Engineers (USACE) Europe District FEST-A Team from Wiesbaden, Germany in October/November 2008. Upon arrival to Kandahar, the team was tasked by the Theater Engineer of U.S. Forces Afghanistan (USFOR-A) to find a suitable location in Helmand Province for 2,000-15,000 troops. The primary purpose for the base was to house troops for a majority of an estimated 26,000 additional U.S. troops being deployed to Afghanistan. Throughout all of southern Afghanistan, bases were all at or above capacity leading to the paramount need for a large centrally located base for the surge. The site was chosen primarily to take advantage of the adjacent British Airfield on Camp Bastion and to provide much needed protection to the primary east–west corridor of Highway 1 in Helmand Province.

The 25th Naval Construction Regiment (25th NCR) was the primary construction unit with construction oversight and the command element that the FEST Design team was later attached during the initial stages of construction. The units responsible for the overall construction work in 2008 under the 25th NCR was the Naval Mobile Construction Battalions Seven, Five, and Seventy-Four. Camp Leatherneck was built in a modular fashion to maximize the efficiency of construction locations to provide housing and work space as surge forces flowed into theater. The base layout was designed in modular 'blocks', so the base could have forces on the ground as construction continued in adjacent compartments. All aspects of the design were focused on the speed for construction and with the understanding that the number of troops was unknown. Initially dubbed Tombstone II as an expansion of a smaller Special Forces Camp adjacent to the ANA Shorabak base, it was eventually renamed Camp Leatherneck once it was formally announced that I Marine Expeditionary Force would move to southern Afghanistan and determined the main force occupying the base in 2009. The authorization to move forces was not given until after new Commander-in-Chief Inauguration of President Obama in early 2009.

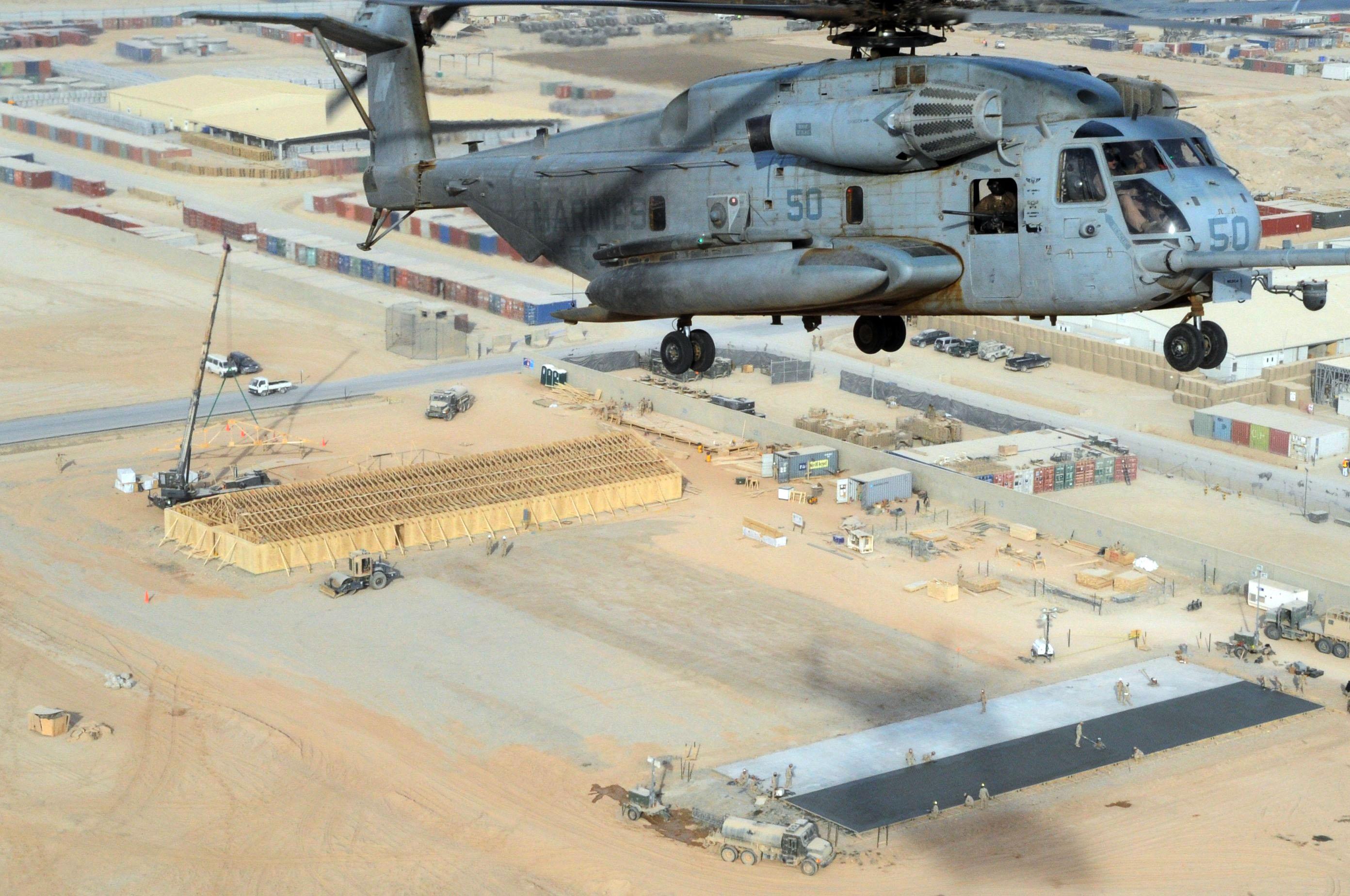
A U.S. Marine Corps CH-53 Sea Stallion helicopter flies over a Seabee project site in January 2011

From Design to Initial Occupancy of Forces was only four months with a late-November 2008 ground-breaking. Although construction was continued by the Marines for several years to improve facilities, the overall basecamp was functional and operational in less than six months for over 12,000 troops and an equal number of civilian contractors prior to their arrival. Marines from the 2nd Marine Expeditionary Brigade arrived in March 2009 to establish Command and Control of Camp Leatherneck and prepare for the arrival of I Marine Expeditionary Force to assume the role as the Regional Command Southwest who ultimately replaced the 2nd Marine Expeditionary Brigade in March 2010.

National Geographic Explorer profiled the base in a 2010 episode.

On 16 May 2010, the Supply Management Unit lot had a fire that burned for over 8 hours, causing extensive damage. Marine Wing Support Squadron 274's CFR (Crash Fire Rescue), Naval Mobile Construction Battalion FIVE, and British firefighters from Camp Bastion were responsible for extinguishing the blaze. Throughout most of the firefighting effort, Camp Leatherneck was also hit with one of their most intense sandstorms to date.

In 2011, security responsibilities for Camp Leatherneck and the surrounding area were assumed by Task Force Belleau Wood, commanded by US Marine Colonel Michael Sweeney.

In 2012, the adjacent Camp Bastion was attacked by Taliban forces, killing two Americans and significantly damaging American aircraft.

In 2013, the Special Inspector General for Afghanistan Reconstruction, John F. Sopko, stated that $34 million had been spent on a 64,000-square-foot facility that "presumably will never be used".

On 26 October 2014, U.S. Marines and British combat troops officially marked the end of their operations in Afghanistan, transferring Camps Leatherneck and Bastion to Afghan control. As national anthems from the three countries played, service members from all three countries stood at attention. The Marine flags were ceremoniously furled and cased, in recognition of the end of mission.

== Environmental issues ==
When the Camp was turned over to Afghan control in 2014, 420,000 bottles of water, "which if lined up end to end would stretch for more than 50 miles" were left behind. About ten thousand MREs (meals, ready-to-eat) were incinerated "that might have been used to feed Afghan troops, but were nearing their expiration date".

More than 7,500 computers were destroyed or removed, the television sets remained.

== Former units ==
United States Marine Corps

- 2nd Marine Expeditionary Brigade from March 2009 until March 2010.
- I Marine Expeditionary Force(FWD) from March 2010 until March 2011, March 2012 until February 2013.
- II Marine Expeditionary Force(FWD) from March 2011 until March 2012, February 2013 until February 2014.
- 3rd Battalion, 25th Marines. - September 2010 – March 2011
- 1st Battalion, 2nd Marines.
- 1st Battalion, 25th Marines – August 2011 – December 2011
- Golf Company, 2nd Battalion, 5th Marines between February and September 2012.
- Alpha Company, 1st Battalion, 1st Marines between June and December 2012.
- Alpha Company, Bravo Company, Charlie Company, 1st Battalion, 9th Marines between September 2013 to May 2014.
- Lima Company, 3rd Battalion, 2nd Marines between March and December 2017.

United States Navy

- Naval Mobile Construction Battalion (3, 4, 5, 74, 133, 14, 15, 25, 28)

United States Coast Guard

- Redeployment Assistance Inspection Detachment (RAID) Until 2013

United States Army

- 849th Quartermaster Company (January – December 2010)
- 576th Mobility Augmentation Company (Route Clearance) March–December 2009
- 13th Combat Support Company (May 2009-May 2010) 13th Combat Sustainment Support Battalion (United States)?
- 68th combat support sustainment brigade (2009–2010) FT CARSON CO 68th Combat Sustainment Support Battalion (United States)?
- 811th Ordnance Company (2009–2010)
- 149TH Transportation Company 7TH Sustainment Brigade (2009–2010)
- 24th Quartermaster Company (Ft Lewis, WA) (May 2009 – 2010)
- 348th Transportation Company (August 2009-July 2010)
- 539th Transportation Company (March 2011-March 2012)
- 594th Transportation Company (2011–2012) Ft Campbell, KY
- 571st Sapper Company (2011–2012) FT Lewis, WA
- 393rd Combat Sustainment Support Battalion (9 June 2012 to 9 April 2013)
- 856th Quartermaster Supply Company (7 September 2012 to 9 May 2013)
- 2nd Modular Ammunition Platoon, 23rd Ordnance Company (August 2013-May 2014) Grafenwöhr, Germany
- 31st Combat Support Hospital (2014)
- 1413th Engineer Company (13 April 2014 to 24 October 2014)

Aviation units

Key

- Marine Aircraft Wing = MAW
- Marine Aircraft Group = MAG
- Marine Attack Squadron = VMA
- Marine Light Attack Helicopter Squadron = HMLA
- Marine Heavy Helicopter Squadron = HMH
- Marine Medium Tiltrotor Squadron = VMM
- Marine Wing Support Squadron = MWSS
- Marine Aviation Logistics Squadron = MALS

Units

- 3rd Marine Aircraft Wing (Forward) (3rd MAW (FWD)) – Marine Aircraft Group 16 (MAG 16) – Marine Heavy Helicopter Squadron 466 (HMH-466) between January and August 2010.
- 2nd MAW (FWD) – MAG 29 – HMH-464 from January 2010
- 2nd MAW (FWD) – MAG 29 – Marine Wing Support Squadron 274 (MWSS-274) between February and September 2010.
- 3rd MAW (FWD) – MAG 11 – MWSS-373 between September 2010 and March 2011.
- 1st MAW (FWD) – MAG 24 – HMH-362 during December 2010.
- 2nd MAW (FWD) – MAG 26 – VMM-264 during June 2011.
- 1st MAW (FWD) – HMH-363 during January 2012.
- 2nd MAW (FWD) – MAG 14 – VMA-223 until May 2012.
- 3rd MAW (FWD) – MAG 13 – Marine Attack Squadron 211 (VMA-211) between May and September 2012 with the McDonnell Douglas AV-8B Harrier II.
- 3rd MAW (FWD) – MAG 39 – Marine Light Attack Helicopter Squadron 369 (HMLA-369) between April and unknown with Bell AH-1W SuperCobra's and Bell UH-1Y Venom's.
- 3rd MAW (FWD) – MAG 16 – HMH-466 between January and August 2012.
- 2nd MAW (FWD) – MAG 26 – VMM-365 between January and July 2012.
- 3rd MAW (FWD) – MAG 16 – VMM-161 from July 2012.
- 1st MAW (FWD) – MAG 24 – HMH-362 until Fall 2012.
- 3rd MAW (FWD) – MAG 16 – HMH-361 from Fall 2012.
- 3rd MAW (FWD) – MAG 39 – HMLA-469 until November 2012.
- 3rd MAW (FWD) – MAG 39 – HMLA-169 from November 2012.
- 3rd MAW (FWD) – MAG 16 – Marine Aviation Logistics Squadron 16 (MALS-16) between April 2012 and unknown.
- 3rd MAW (FWD) – MAG 11 – MWSS-373 during September 2012.
- 2nd MAW (FWD) – MAG 14 – VMA-231 until Spring 2013
- 3rd MAW (FWD) – MAG 13 – VMA-311 from Spring 2013
- 2nd MAW (FWD) – MAG 29 – HMLA-167 Between February 2013 and November 2013
- 2nd MAW (FWD) – MAG 29 – HMH-461 until August 2013.
- 3rd MAW (FWD) – MAG 16 – HMH-462 from August 2013.
- 3rd MAW (FWD) – MAG 39 – HMLA-369 between November 2013 and May 2014 with Bell AH-1W SuperCobra's and Bell UH-1Y Venom's.
- 2nd MAW (FWD) – MAG 29 – HMLA-467 which operated Bell AH-1W SuperCobra's and Bell UH-1Y Venom's from May 2014 until October 2014.
- 2nd MAW (FWD) – MAG 29 – MWSS-274 from 7 April 2014 until October 2014.

== See also ==
- Camp Bastion
  - September 2012 Camp Bastion raid
- List of Afghan Armed Forces installations
- List of United States Marine Corps installations
