= Marine Wing Support Group 27 =

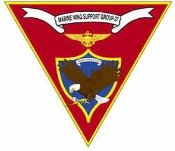
- MWSG-27 insignia
- Active: 1 July 1953 - 14 May 2012; 22 May 2018 - active
- Country: United States
- Allegiance: United States of America
- Branch: United States Marine Corps
- Role: Aviation combat service support
- Part of: 2nd Marine Aircraft Wing; II Marine Expeditionary Force
- Garrison/HQ: Marine Corps Air Station Cherry Point
- Engagements: Operation Desert Storm; Operation Enduring Freedom; Operation Iraqi Freedom

Commanders
- Current commander: Colonel John P. Sullivan, Jr.

Marine Wing Support Group 27 (MWSG-27) is a United States Marine Corps aviation combat service support unit based at Marine Corps Air Station Cherry Point. It was composed of four squadrons, which provide the 2nd Marine Aircraft Wing and II Marine Expeditionary Force with complete airfield operation services (less air traffic control), engineer and transportation support, medical assistance, food services, security support, and other direct combat and combat service support to aviation combat elements.

== Mission ==
Command and control all functions of Aviation Ground Support (AGS) within the Marine Aircraft Wing (MAW), in garrison or deployed as part of the Aviation Combat Element (ACE) of the Marine Air-Ground Task Force (MAGTF)

== Subordinate units ==
- Marine Wing Support Squadron 271
- Marine Wing Support Squadron 272
- Marine Wing Support Detachment 273
- Marine Wing Support Squadron 274

== History ==
Marine Wing Service Group 27 was activated on 1 July 1953, and redesignated as Marine Wing Support Group 27 on 1 April 1967. The Support Group was established after years of staff study, several reorganizations and extensive planning to determine the organization needed to best meet its unique mission. That mission encompasses most of the capabilities needed to establish and operate airfields and aviation forward sites in an expeditionary environment.

In earlier years, Marine Wing Support Group 27 (MWSG-27) was composed of three squadrons and a sub unit: Headquarters and Maintenance Squadron (H&MS-27), VMGR-252, Wing Equipment and Repair Squadron (WERS-27), and sub-unit 1 (SU-1) of Marine Weapons Unit 2 (MWWU-2). With the implementation of the Marine Corps Combat Service Support Concept, the Group ceased all aviation functions on 20 April 1976. This included the separation of VMGR-252 from the Group and the detachment of SU-1, MWWU-2. On 13 May 1976, Headquarters and Maintenance Squadron 27 and Wing Equipment Repair Squadron 27 were redesignated Headquarters and Ground Maintenance Squadron 27 and Wing Transport Squadron 27(WTS-27) respectively. On that same date Wing Engineer Squadron 27 (WES-27) was activated.

Detachments (Dets) "A" and "B", were activated at MCAS New River and MCAS Beaufort to provide support service at those stations. Det "A" was activated on 10 September 1976; Det "B" was activated on 27 October 1976. MWSG-27 was then composed of three squadrons and two detachments: H&MS-27, WES-27, WTS-27, and Dets "A" and "B". During December 1979 through January 1980, MWSG-27 once again reorganized under the Service Support concept at which time H&MS-27 was redesignated as Headquarters Squadron 27 (HQS-27).

On 1 January 1986, MWSG-27 reorganized in to its present configuration with the implementation of the Marine Wing Support Squadron (MWSS) concept. The reorganization required MWSG-27 to consolidate personnel and equipment from the three squadrons and two detachments with the five Marine Air Base Squadrons (MABS) located at four different geographic airfields. HQS-27 was redesignated as Headquarters and Headquarters Squadron 27 (H&HS-27), WTS-27 with MABS elements became MWSS-271, Det "A" with MABS elements redesignated as MWSS-272, Det "B" with MABS elements was redesignated as MWSS-273, and WES-27 with MABS elements was redesignated as MWSS-274.

In August of 1990 with the invasion of Kuwait by Iraqi military forces, the Marine Wing Support Squadrons deployed to Saudi Arabia and set up forward expeditionary airfields in support of Operation Desert Shield and Operation Desert Storm. The MWSG-27 headquarters also sent elements to coordinate the two squadrons during the combat operations in the desert. In the summer of 1991 those elements deployed returned to the United States. From the summer of 1991 to the summer of 1997 the MWSG continued providing support to the 2nd Marine Aircraft Wing during normal operations, exercises, deployments and training. During this same period, MWSS 271 was designated as the principal squadron to run one of two expeditionary airfields currently in operation within the United States at Marine Corps Auxiliary Landing Field Bogue Field while maintaining support in conjunction with MWSS-274 at Marine Corps Air Station Cherry Point.

In April 1997, the MWSG-27 headquarters element went through a restructuring and redesignation. The Headquarters and Headquarters Squadron-27 was redesignated as Headquarters 27 and the Personnel and Support Detachment 27 was incorporated into this new structure.

On 14 May 2012 MWSG 27 disbanded and its squadrons came under direct control of the four Marine Aircraft Groups of 2nd Marine Aircraft Wing. On 22 May 2018, MWSG-27 was reactivated at MCAS Cherry Point. As part of the re-organisation of the corps, MWSG-27 will be de-activated by 2030.

== See also ==
- List of United States Marine Corps wing support groups
