= Marine Wing Support Squadron 272 =

US Marine Corps unit

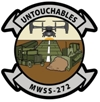
- MWSS-272 (The Untouchables) insignia
- Active: 6 June 1986 – present
- Country: United States
- Branch: United States Marine Corps
- Type: Aviation Ground Support Squadron
- Part of: Marine Aircraft Group 26; 2nd Marine Aircraft Wing
- Garrison/HQ: Marine Corps Air Station New River
- Nickname(s): Untouchables
- Engagements: Operation Desert Storm; Operation Enduring Freedom; Operation Iraqi Freedom * 2003 invasion of Iraq

Commanders
- Commanding Officer: LtCol Brandon P. Mokris
- Executive Officer: Maj Jarrett S. Loftis
- Sergeant Major: Sgt Maj Steven J. Tholen

Marine Wing Support Squadron 272 (MWSS 272) is an aviation ground support unit of the United States Marine Corps. They are based out of Marine Corps Air Station New River, North Carolina. The squadron, nicknamed "The Untouchables," falls under the command of Marine Wing Support Group 27 and the 2nd Marine Aircraft Wing.

== Mission ==
Provide all essential Aviation Ground Support (AGS) requirements to a designated rotary-wing component of an Aviation Combat Element (ACE) including all supporting or attached elements of the Marine Air Control Group.

When tasked with operating an airfield the squadron must conduct all aviation and ground refueling, aircraft recovery and firefighting, expeditionary airfield services, explosive ordnance disposal and weather services.

When tasked with supporting airfield functions the squadron provides essential engineer services; field messing facilities; internal airfield communications; individual and unit training; motor transport support; nuclear, chemical and biological defense; routine and emergency sick call and aviation medicine; security and law enforcement; and an Airbase Commandant. The Squadron is the enabling organization for the employment of Marine Aviation ashore

== Subordinate units ==
- Headquarters & Services Company
- Airfield Operations Company
- Engineer Company
- Motor Transportation Company

== History ==
Marine Wing Support Squadron 272 was activated on 6 June 1986 at Marine Corps Air Station New River, North Carolina. MWSS-272 was organized from the assets of Marine Air Base Squadron 26, Marine Air Base Squadron 29 and Detachment "A", Marine Wing Support Group 27, which were deactivated on 5 June 1986.

=== Global War on Terror ===
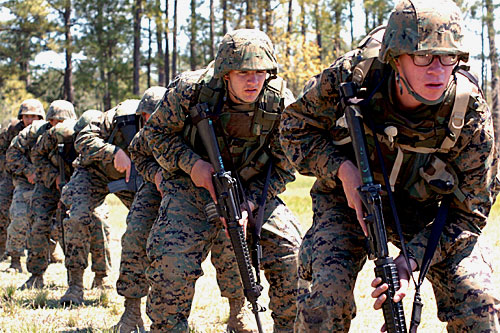
Marines from the MWSS 272 prepare to fire during training on the Enhanced Marksmanship Program range, 7–13 April 2005.

In late 2001, MWSS-272 augmented several Marine Expeditionary Units in support of Operation Enduring Freedom (OEF).

MWSS-272 deployed to the Persian Gulf in support of Operation Iraqi Freedom (OIF) in February 2003 and remained there until June 2003. MWSS-272 was responsible for providing aviation ground support to three Forward Operating Bases (FOBs) at Al Jabr, Ali Al Salem, and Joe Foss. FOB Joe Foss was the largest expeditionary airfield built since World War II, and it was vitally important to air assault and medevac operations during the war.

In 2004, MWSS-272 augmented both MWSS-271 and MWSS-273 with personnel for their AGS mission in Iraq again as well as providing personnel to support operations for OEF in the Horn of Africa. In August 2005 the Squadron deployed to Al Asad Iraq in support of Operation Iraqi Freedom, and provided aviation ground support for the entire airbase at Al Asad as well as FOB Al Qaim.

In 2009 Marines from MWSS-272 augmented MWSS-271 in support of Operation Iraqi Freedom (OIF), and provided aviation ground support at various airbases throughout the forward operating area.

The Squadron deployed to Afghanistan in 2011 in support of Operation Enduring Freedom, again providing aviation ground support at various locations across Helmand Province.

On 29 February 2012, operational control of MWSS-272 transferred from Marine Wing Support Group 27 to Marine Aircraft Group 26, in advance of the deactivation of MWSG-27 during May 2012. As a result of this permanent change, and to reflect the all-MV22 type/model/series make-up of MAG-26, the Squadron patch was redesigned to incorporate elements that reflect its mission of expeditionary airfield construction and aviation ground support. The elements are a M970 refueling truck and a Medium Crawler Tractor bulldozer, at the end of an AM-2 airfield matting runway. An Osprey tiltrotor aircraft now dominates the top half of the patch, included to reflect the airframe flown by MWSS-272's sister squadrons of MAG-26.

== See also ==
- United States Marine Corps Aviation
- Organization of the United States Marine Corps
- List of United States Marine Corps aviation support units
