= Marine Wing Support Squadron 274 =

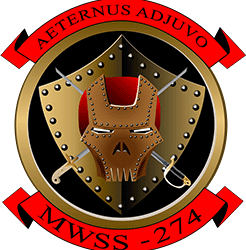
- MWSS-274's insignia
- Active: 2 June 1986 – 21 May 2021
- Country: United States
- Branch: United States Marine Corps
- Type: Aviation ground support squadron
- Part of: Marine Aircraft Group 29; 2nd Marine Aircraft Wing
- Garrison/HQ: Marine Corps Air Station Cherry Point
- Nickname(s): Ironmen
- Motto(s): "Aeternus Adjuvo" "Eternal Support"
- Engagements: Operation Desert Storm; Operation Iraqi Freedom; Operation Enduring Freedom

Commanders
- Commanding Officer: LtCol Mark D. Schouten

Marine Wing Support Squadron 274 (MWSS-274) is an aviation ground support unit of the United States Marine Corps. They are based out of Marine Corps Air Station Cherry Point, North Carolina. The squadron falls under the command of Marine Wing Support Group 27 and the 2nd Marine Aircraft Wing.

== Mission ==
Provide Aviation Ground Support to enable a composite Marine Aircraft Group and supporting or attached elements of the Marine Air Control Group to conduct expeditionary operations.

== History ==
=== The Gulf War & the 1990s ===
Marine Wing Support Squadron 274 (MWSS-274) was activated on 2 June 1986 at Marine Corps Air Station Cherry Point, North Carolina as part of a reorganization of Aviation Ground Support within all Marine Aircraft Wings. The reorganization entailed the consolidation of personnel and equipment from Marine Air Base Squadron 32 (MABS-32), Wing Engineer Squadron 27 (WES-27), and Wing Transportation Squadron 27 (WTS-27) after their deactivation on 2 June 1986.

The Squadron deployed to Southwest Asia in support of aviation operations during Operation Desert Shield and Operation Desert Storm where it distinguished itself as a combat ready MWSS.

In January 1991, while deployed to Southwest Asia, the Squadron was required to shift its focus from the Gulf War to a Noncombatant Evacuation Operation, Operation Eastern Exit in Somalia. Supporting the 4th Marine Expeditionary Brigade.

MWSS-274 found itself deployed to Current Island, Bermuda in support of hurricane relief operations in the wake of Hurricane Andrew.

=== Global War on Terror and Beyond ===
In January 2003 many of the deployable Marines of MWSS-274 were transferred to sister squadron MWSS-271, also based at MCAS Cherry Point. On 12 February 2003 the Marines of 271 and 274 shipped to Kuwait, flying into Ali Al Saleem Airbase. In less than a month these Marines would be providing support to an airstrip in Iraq as part of the 2003 invasion of Iraq.

Old squadron insignia.

Shortly after the merger of MWSS-271 and 274 in 2003, due to a lack of available personnel within the Marine Logistics Brigade, MWSS-274 was redesignated as MEU Service Support Group 22 (MSSG-22) as part of the 22nd Marine Expeditionary Unit (22nd MEU). This was done because many of the military occupational specialties of the Marines in a MWSS are identical to that of the Logistics Combat Element (LCE) required by a MSSG. Departing for sea in 2004, MWSS-274, as part of the 22nd MEU, made Marine Corps history and set a new precedent for ship to shore operations as the unit moved inland to conduct sustained combat operations in Afghanistan as part of Operation Enduring Freedom.

From February to September 2006 and for the first time in over 10 years MWSS-274 deployed to Al Asad Airbase in Iraq as a complete squadron under her own guidon to conduct Aviation Ground Combat Support.

In December 2007 the squadron was again re-designated from a wing service support squadron to a security battalion and after pre-deployment work ups, the unit in February 2008 again deployed to Al Asad Air Base in Iraq this time as a security force in support of Operation Iraqi Freedom. Upon returning in October 2008 the unit was re-designated back to a service support squadron.

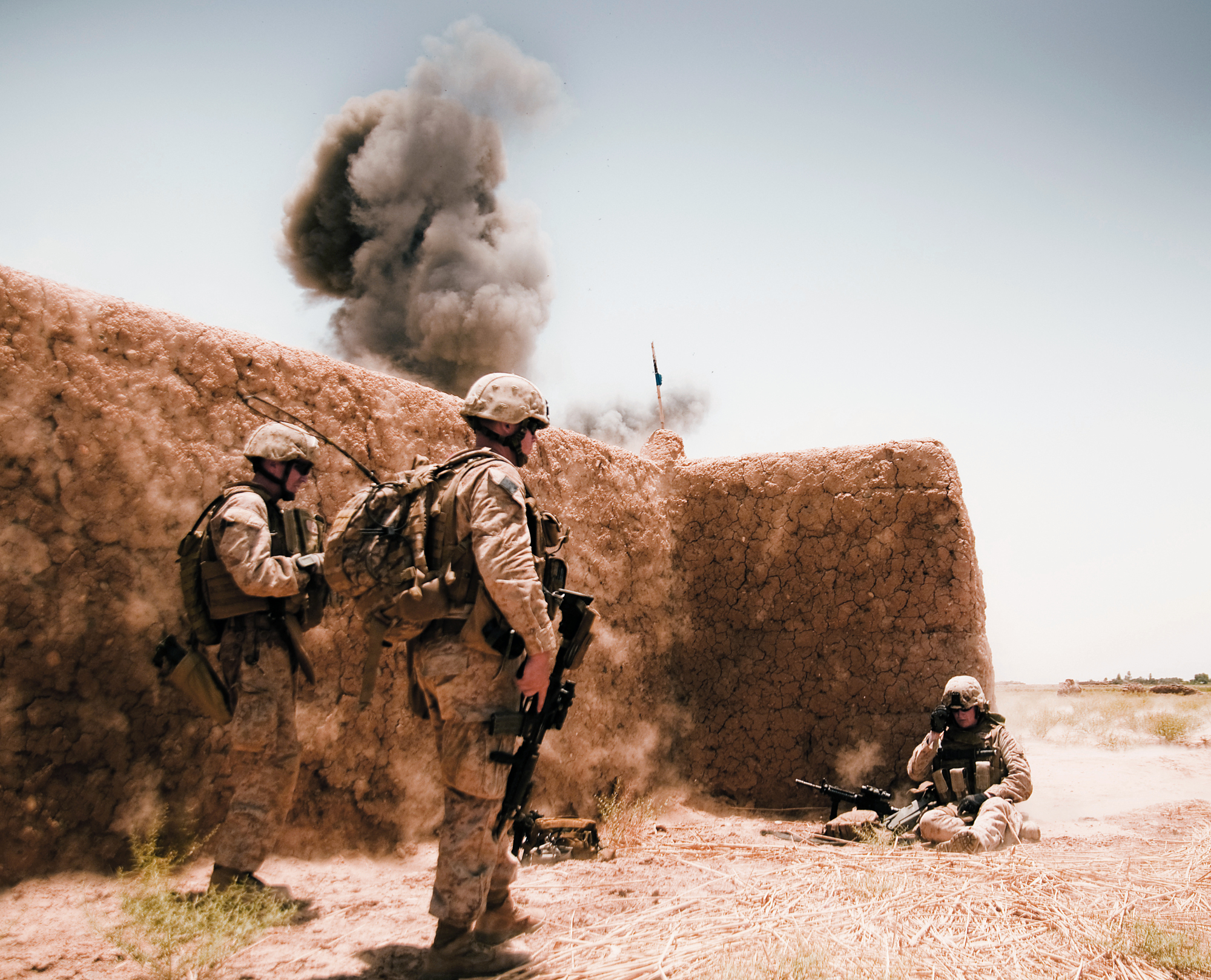
U.S. Marines with Marine Wing Support Squadron 274 EOD destroy an Improvised Explosive Device (IED) cache in Southern Shorsurak, Helmand Province in June 2010.

Under command of Lt Col. Anthony Ference and Sgt Major William Grigsby, the unit deployed under its own guidon, conducting Aviation Ground Combat Support, only for the second time in two decades. In February 2010, MWSS-274 deployed to Camp Leatherneck in Helmand Province, Afghanistan in support of Operation Enduring Freedom (OEF). The Marine's of MWSS 274 earned the Marine Corps Support Squadron of the year from several achievements that were made during this deployment. While deployed, the unit was put through an inspection for which they passed and set the standards and bar for other and follow on units. The Corporal's of the unit's armory also established groundbreaking scores on inspections as well as establishing guidelines for field armories based on their set up of a secure compound within the unit's compound. Marines in the Air Operations Company performed work in rebuilding airfields, FOBs, and helicopter pads. A main achievement that must be mention was by MWSS-274's Crash Fire Rescue where they extinguished a fire at Camp Leatherneck's SMU. Marines of this unit's EOD were outsourced to other units in Helmand Providence, including in direct support of Operation Moshtarak, also known as the Battle of Marjah, where they provided support in IED detection and destruction..

In 2012, Marine Wing Support Group 27 was disestablished, and MWSS-274 was transferred to Marine Aircraft Group 29.

From March 2014 to November 2014, MWSS-274(-) deployed to Afghanistan in support of OEF, as the final MWSS detachment to deploy. MWSS-274(-) worked diligently with Redeployment and Retrograde in support of Reset and Reconstitution Operations Group to return salvageable USMC equipment to the U.S. while also disposing of materiel excess. As a result of these accomplishments, MWSS-274 earned II MEF logistics unit of the year and Marine Wing Support Squadron of the year recognition.

In November 2014, MWSS-274 won the MajGen WPT Hill Award for best expeditionary field mess in the Marine Corps. Then in 2015, The Ironmen were recognized a second year in a row as best field mess within II MEF.

In June 2016, MWSS-274 celebrated its 30th birthday.

== Unit awards ==
A unit citation or commendation is an award bestowed upon an organization for the action cited. Members of the unit who participated in said actions are allowed to wear on their uniforms the awarded unit citation. MWSS-274 has been presented with the following awards:

== See also ==
- United States Marine Corps Aviation
- Organization of the United States Marine Corps
- List of United States Marine Corps aviation support units
