= List of United States Marine Corps wing support groups =

This is a list of the four wing support groups in the United States Marine Corps. They provide the Marine air wings with organic and deployable combat support, and combat service support centralized for economy of personnel and equipment.

Official Name	Insignia	Headquarters
Marine Wing Support Group 17		Marine Corps Air Station Futenma, California
Marine Wing Support Group 27		Marine Corps Air Station Cherry Point, North Carolina
Marine Wing Support Group 37		Marine Corps Air Station Miramar
Marine Wing Support Group 47		Selfridge Air National Guard Base
