= HMLA-467 =

Marine Light Attack Helicopter Squadron 467
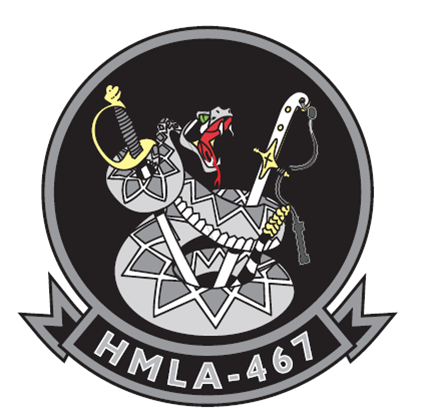
- HMLA-467 insignia
- Active: 23 October 2008 – 16 June 2016
- Country: United States
- Branch: United States Marine Corps
- Type: Light Attack Helicopter Squadron
- Role: Close air support Utility; Command and Control; Assault Support
- Part of: Marine Aircraft Group 29; 2nd Marine Aircraft Wing
- Garrison/HQ: Marine Corps Air Station New River
- Nickname: Sabers
- Mottos: "Constans in Factum" "Steady in Action"
- Tail Code: CA
- Mascot: Rattlesnake

Commanders
- Commanding Officer: LtCol. David B. Moore
- Executive Officer: Maj. Steven R. Thompson
- Sergeant Major: SgtMaj. John M. Kennedy

Aircraft flown
- Attack helicopter: AH-1W Super Cobra (2008–2016)
- Utility helicopter: UH-1N Twin Huey (2008–2013); UH-1Y Venom (2013–2016)

Marine Light Attack Helicopter Squadron 467 (HMLA-467) was a United States Marine Corps helicopter squadron consisting of AH-1W SuperCobra attack helicopters and UH-1Y Venom utility helicopters. The squadron, nicknamed the "Sabers", was based at Marine Corps Air Station New River, North Carolina and was under the command of Marine Aircraft Group 29 (MAG-29) and the 2nd Marine Aircraft Wing (2nd MAW). The squadron's aircraft markings are grey & white stripes on the aircraft tail to replicate the tail markings on a Diamondback Rattlesnake and the markings on the lighthouses in North Carolina.

The stand-up of HMLA-467 was part of the Commandant's plan to "grow the force" to better meet the demands of the Long War and the complexities of an evolving global threat. They were activated in October 2008.

== Mission ==
Support the Marine Air-Ground Task Force commander by providing offensive air support, utility support, armed escort and airborne supporting arms coordination, day or night under all weather conditions during expeditionary, joint or combined operations.

== History ==
HMLA-467 began as a cadre in April 2008, and began to stand up using aircraft from the reserve squadron HMLA-775. During September 2008, pilots and aircrew from HMLA-467 received their first aircraft from HMLA-775 and flew them to MCAS Cherry Point for the squadron's activation ceremony on 23 October 2008, becoming the first HMLA to be activated in 37 years. Fifteen weeks later, in January, HMLA-467 supported Marine Aircraft Group 31 at Exercise Southern Fury.

During the months of September and October 2009, the Sabers supported Enhanced Mojave Viper (EMV) at Marine Corps Air Ground Combat Center Twentynine Palms. During this exercise the Sabers executed day/night close air support, FAC(A), Escort, Command and Control, SCAR/AR, and weapons delivery training, flying 74 total sorties. During Mojave Viper, on 1 October, the one-year anniversary of the squadron, HMLA-467 reached Full Operational Capability (FOC).

In January 2010, a detachment of UH-1N Hueys deployed with HMH-461 as part of the 22nd Marine Expeditionary Unit in order to provide humanitarian assistance and disaster response in support of Operation Unified Response following the 2010 Haiti earthquake. In 2010 HMLA-467 Det A attached to the 26th Marine Expeditionary Unit and supported HADR operations in Pakistan as well as combat operations in Afghanistan and Libya. In 2011 HMLA-467 Det B was the first east coast HMLA to support the 31st Marine Expeditionary Unit attaching to HMM-265 (REIN) and supporting exercises such as PHIBLEX. In 2012, a detachment of UH-1N Hueys deployed to Retalhuleu Guatemala in support of Operation Martillo.

As a result of force structure reductions, HMLA-467 was deactivated on 16 June 2016.

== Gallery ==
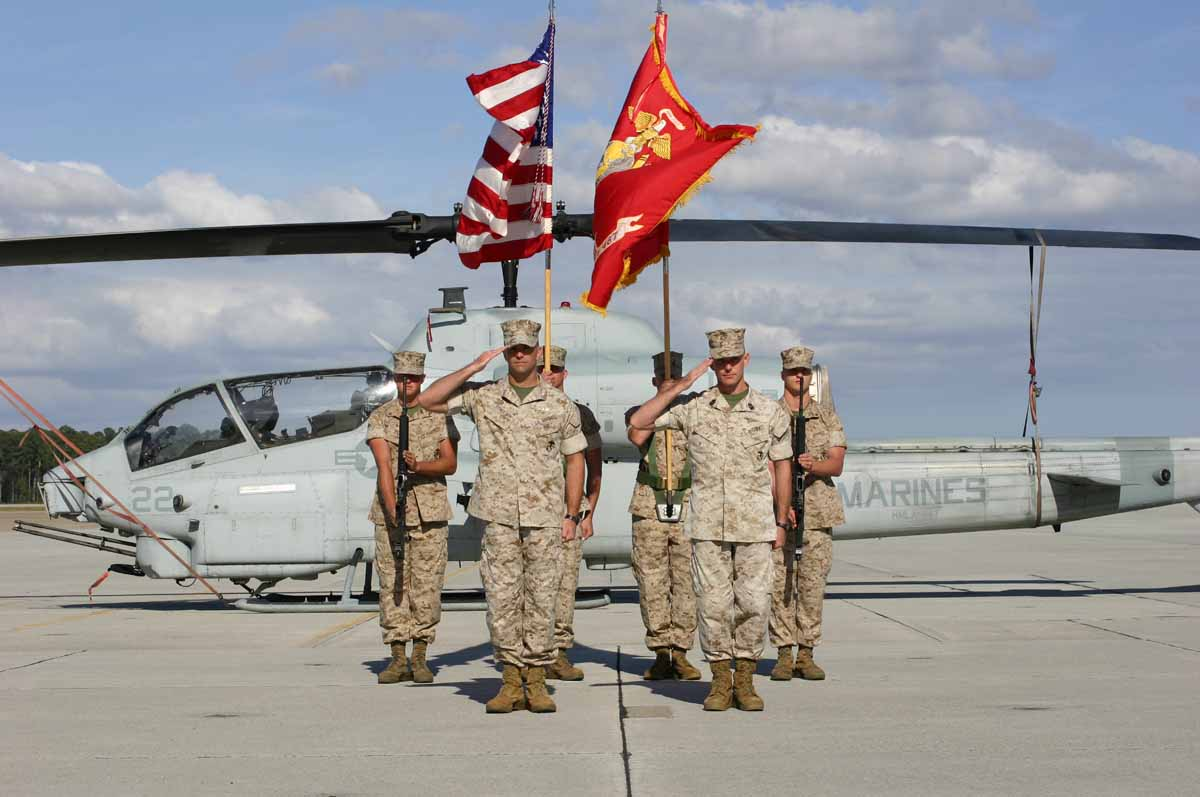
The colorguard of HMLA-467 during its activation ceremony in 2008.

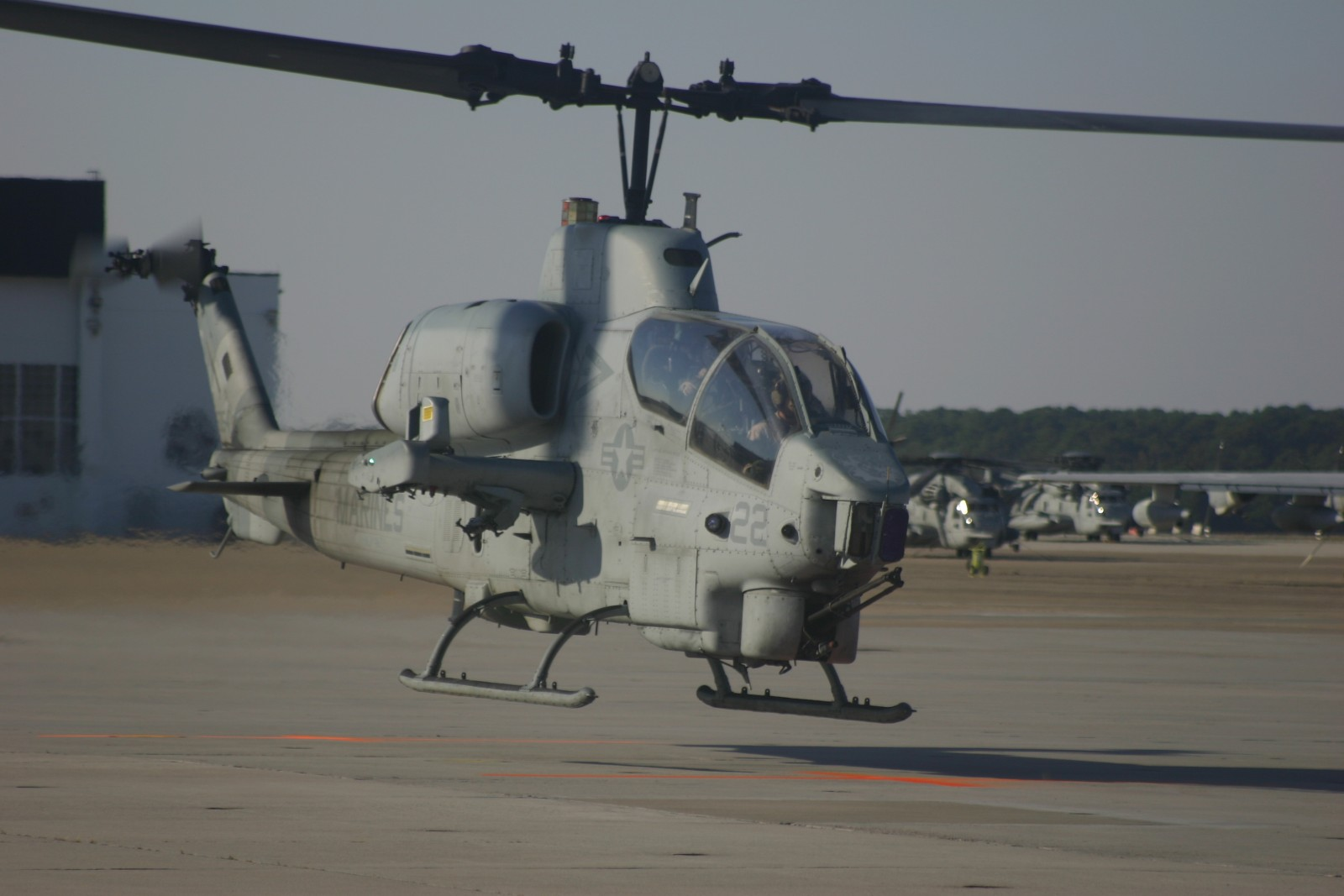
The first AH-1W of HMLA-467 to land at MCAS Cherry Point, October 2008.

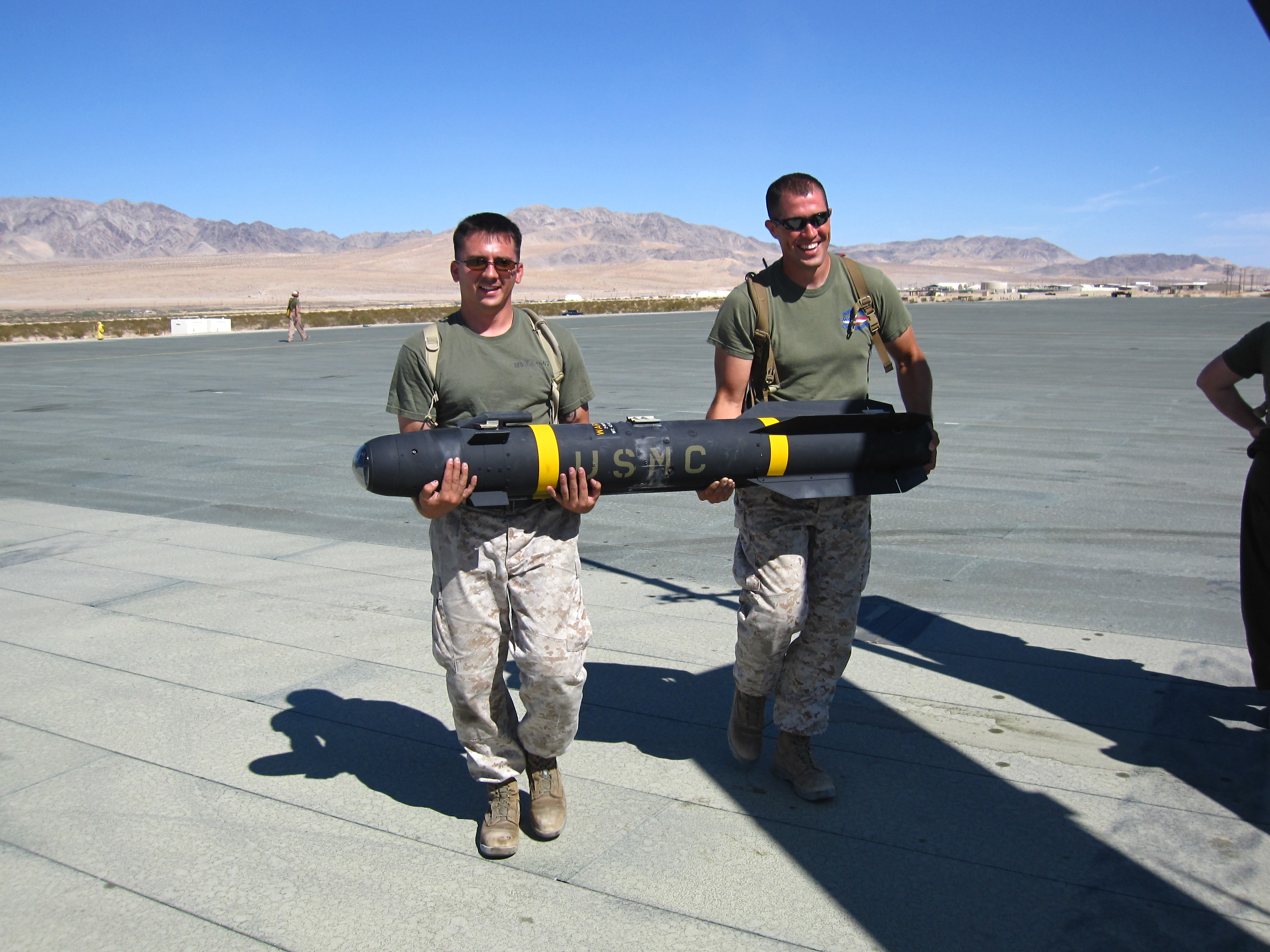
Marines of HMLA-467 carry ordnance during Mojave Viper operations, Twenty-nine Palms, CA.

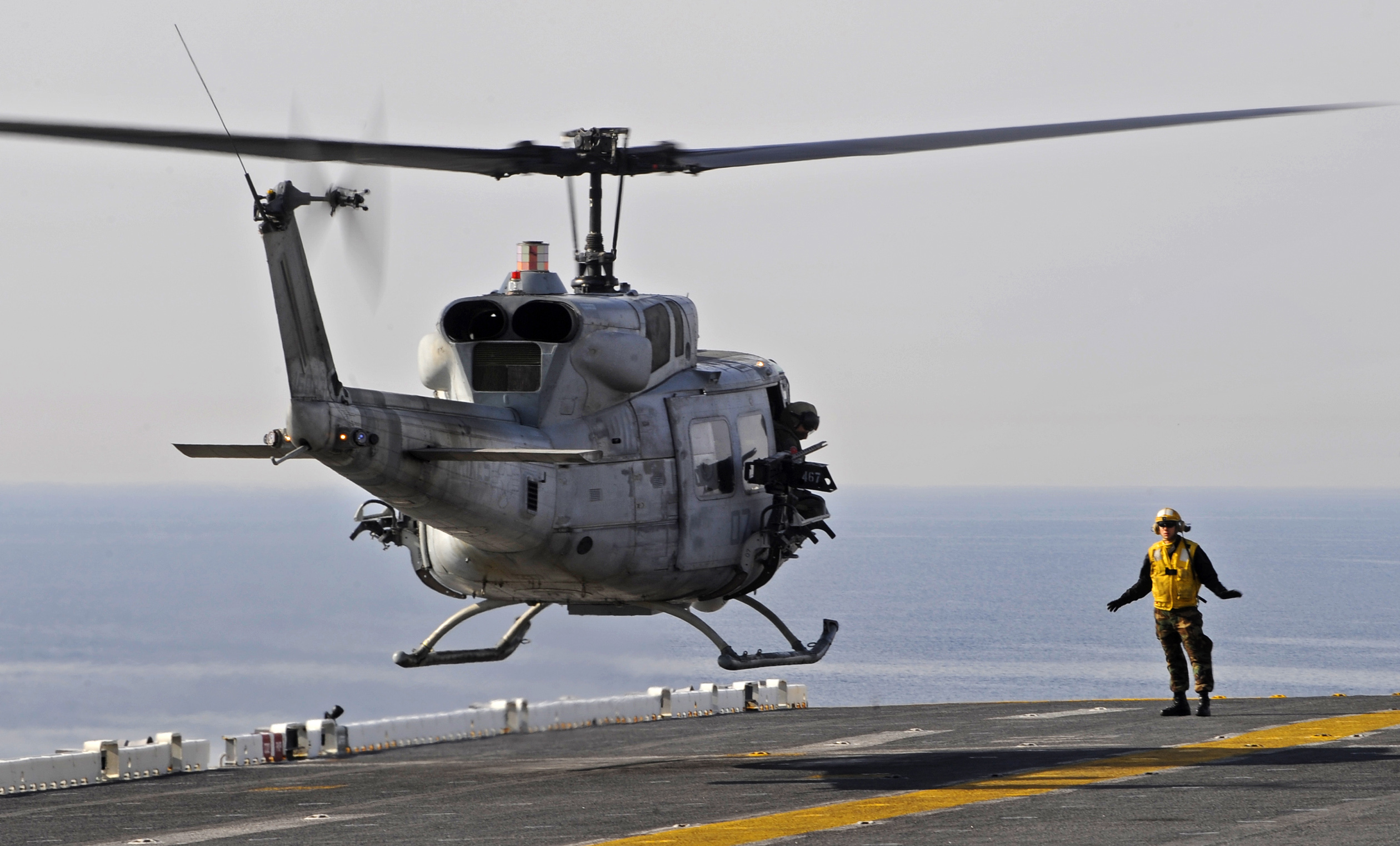
UH-1N Huey from HMLA-467 prepares to touch down on the USS Bataan (LHD-5).

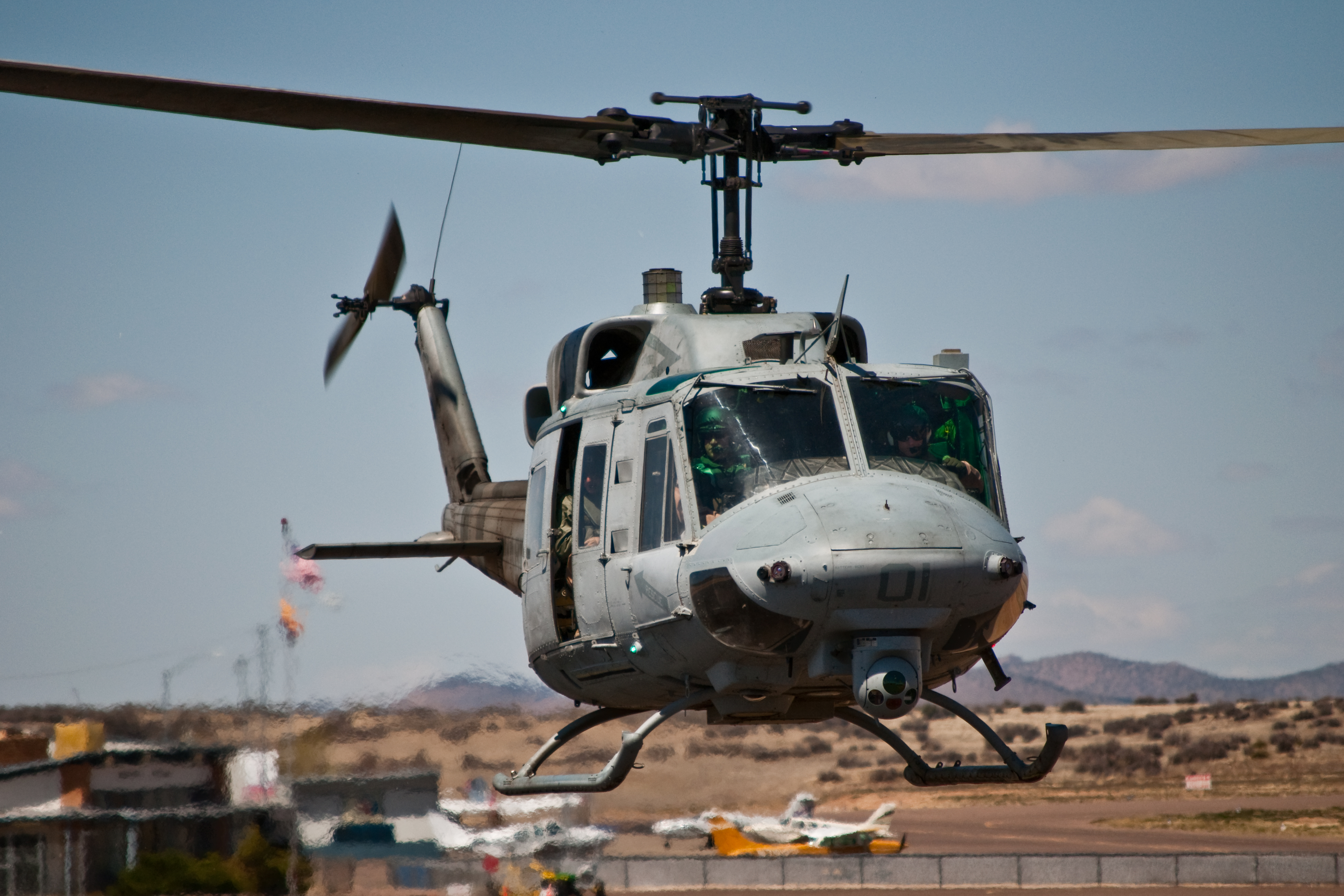
A HMLA-467 UH-1N Huey flies into Prescott, AZ.

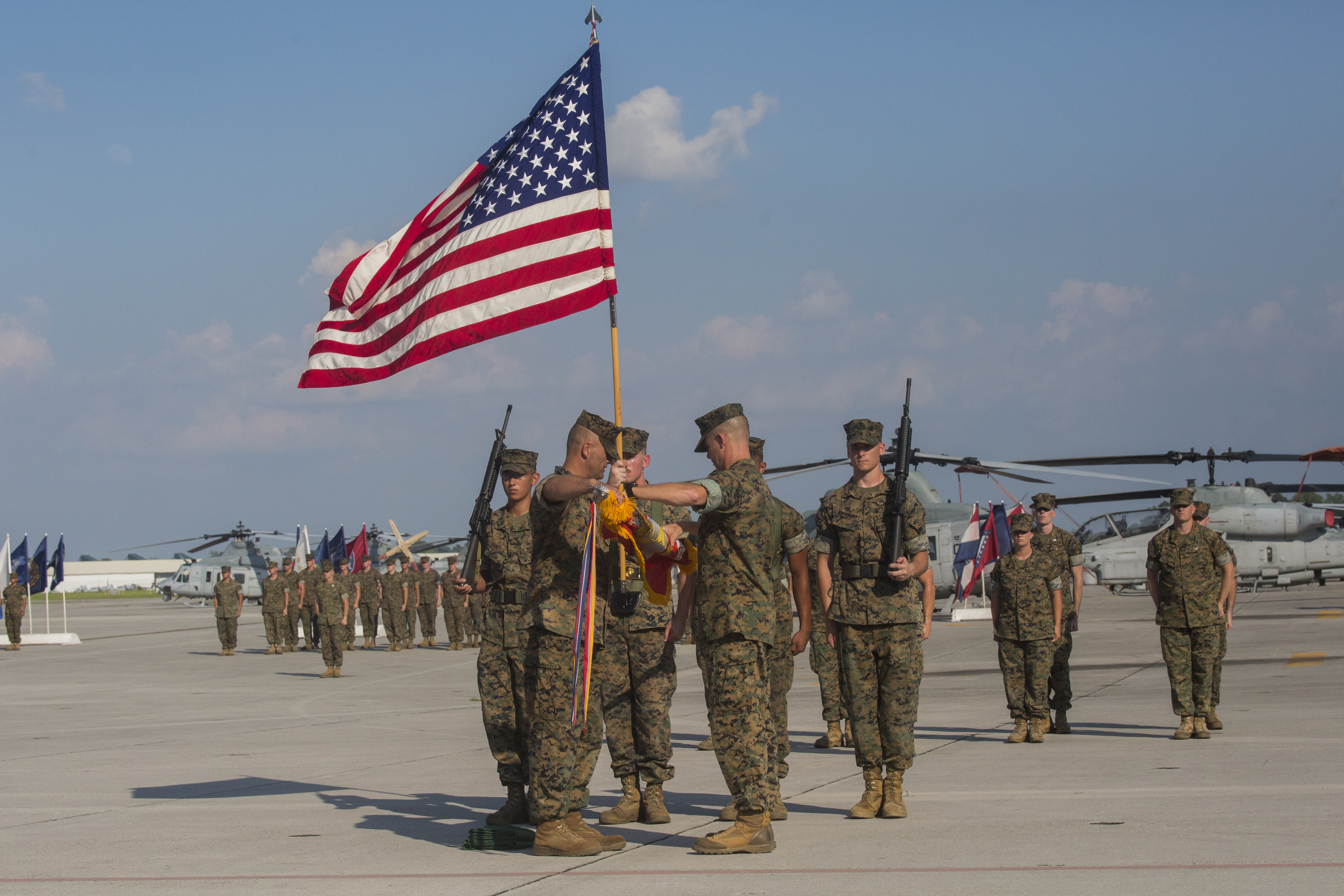
Casing of the Colors during the HMLA-467 deactivation ceremony.

== Unit Awards ==
A unit citation or commendation is an award bestowed upon an organization for the action cited. Members of the unit who participated in said actions are allowed to wear on their uniforms the awarded unit citation. HMLA-467 has been presented with the following awards:

Streamer	Award	Year(s)	Additional Info
	National Defense Service Streamer	2008–2016	War on terrorism
	Global War on Terrorism Service Streamer	2008–2016	
	Armed Forces Expeditionary Streamer	2010–2016	

== See also ==
- United States Marine Corps Aviation
- List of active United States Marine Corps aircraft squadrons
- List of decommissioned United States Marine Corps aircraft squadrons
