= VMMT-204 =

Marine Medium Tiltrotor Training Squadron 204
- VMMT-204 insignia
- Active: 1 May 1972 - present
- Country: United States
- Branch: USMC
- Type: Fleet Replacement Squadron
- Role: Assault support training
- Part of: 2nd Marine Aircraft Wing
- Garrison/HQ: Marine Corps Air Station New River
- Nickname: Raptors
- Tail Code: GX
- Engagements: None

Commanders
- Current commander: LtCol Jeffrey J. Barnes

Aircraft flown
- Transport: MV-22B Osprey

Marine Medium Tiltrotor Training Squadron 204 (VMMT-204) is the MV-22 Osprey training squadron of the United States Marine Corps. Known as the "Raptors", the squadron was originally designated Marine Medium Helicopter Training Squadron 204 (HMT-204) to train new MV-22 pilots and was officially redesignated as VMMT-204 on 10 June 1999. They fall under the command of Marine Aircraft Group 26 (MAG-26) and the 2nd Marine Aircraft Wing (2nd MAW).

== Mission ==
Provide training to Marine and Navy Osprey pilots, Marine crew chiefs and units in the use and maintenance of the MV-22 Osprey tiltrotor aircraft.

== History ==
The unit was formed at Marine Corps Air Station New River, North Carolina, on 1 May 1972. Following the Vietnam War, Marine Helicopter Training Group 40 (MHTG-40) was deactivated and Marine Medium Helicopter Training Squadron-402 and Marine Heavy Helicopter Training Squadron-401 were combined to form HMT-204.

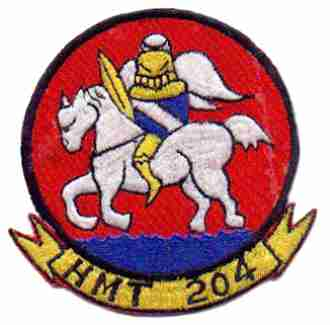
HMT-204 insignia

HMT-204 was originally a composite training squadron, tasked with training both CH-46 and CH-53 pilots. In January 1986, the commanding officer of HMT-204 accepted the first fleet model of the CH-46E Survivability, Reliability and Maintainability (SR&M).

In June 1988, HMT-302 assumed responsibility for training all CH-53 pilots and the last CH-53 departed HMT-204. On 9 November 1988, HMT-204 was awarded the Meritorious Unit Commendation (MUC) for meritorious service in support of Fleet Marine Force (FMF) units during 1987. In October 1993, HMT-301 was deactivated and HMT-204 became the single site Fleet Readiness Squadron for the entire Marine Corps CH-46E community. As a result of this transition, HMT-204 earned the distinction of being the largest CH-46E squadron in the Marine Corps. Additionally, October 1993 saw the establishment of the Fleet Replacement Enlisted Skills Training (FREST) Program. HMT-204 FREST provides comprehensive technical training for officers and enlisted in the operation, maintenance and repair of the CH-46E aircraft and associated equipment.

In fulfilling its then primary mission of training all CH-46E pilots and crew chiefs, HMT-204 has trained over 1,800 CH-46E replacement aircrew (basic, refresher, modified refresher and conversion pilots), over 275 instructor pilots and over 450 crew chiefs.

Additionally, over 100 AV-8B pilots have completed the vertical flight familiarization syllabus, in the CH-46. In December 1995, HMT-204 broke new ground for training pilots and crew chiefs in night formation, night vision goggle operations, terrain flight, navigation and formalized aircrew coordination training.

Since being commissioned, HMT-204 amassed over 95,000 CH-46 class "A" mishap-free flight hours. In recognition of this significant achievement, the squadron has been the recipient of the Chief of Naval Operations Safety Award in fiscal years 1977, 1994, and 1997.

In February 1999, HMM(T)-164 was tasked to become the Marine Corps’ Fleet Replacement Squadron for the CH-46E.

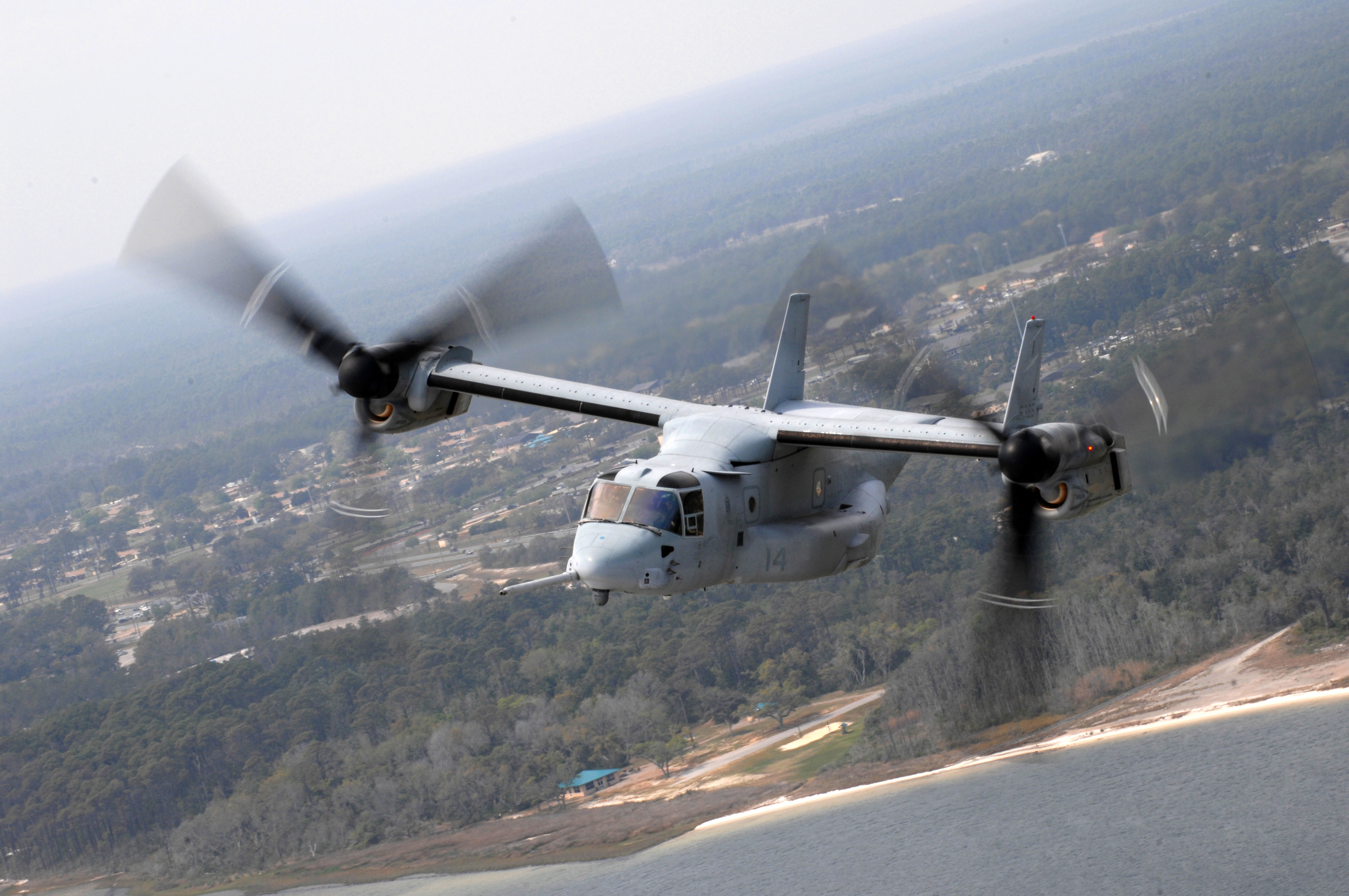
MV-22 Osprey from VMMT-204

VMMT-204 received in April 1999, from Raytheon Systems Company, a new motion-based operational flight trainer (OFT) to train Marine Corps and Air Force instructors to fly the Osprey. The OFT will provide the pilot with computer-generated horizontal and vertical visual scenes within a 24-foot dome. Both out-of-window visual scenes and forward-looking infrared imagery are made possible by the OFT's six-channel visual-display system. Its full range of motion also allows pilots to get "a real feel" of both acceleration and deceleration and gives them the opportunity to train in a broad spectrum of simulated environments.

In 1999, the squadron became Fleet Replacement Squadron for MV-22 "Osprey" tilt-rotor pilots and aircrew. The change of aircraft meant a change in designation, so HMT-204 was re-designated VMMT-204. On 12 March 2000 VMMT-204 accepted its first MV-22 Osprey. The squadron conducted MV-22 flight training until December 2000 when a fatal mishap caused USMC leadership to ground the Osprey for its three-year "return to flight period."

VMMT-204 resumed MV-22 flight operations in 2005 in support of the Marine Corps activation of deploying MV-22 squadrons. As of the end of 2007, VMMT-204 has trained over 150 MV-22 pilots for the first three Marine Corps MV-22 squadrons, and the first USAF CV-22 squadron.

VMMT-204 currently operates the block A and B versions of the MV-22 - the block A aircraft preceded the reliability upgrades designed into the block B version, getting delivered to warfighting squadrons first. Although the block A aircraft is less reliable and less logistically supported than the newer aircraft, VMMT-204 has been able to complete its training requirements. At various times in the squadron's history, up to 6 of the block A aircraft have been used a "parts birds" to support the remaining flyable aircraft. On 25 February 2009, the first Block A aircraft was inducted into the "A to B" mod line.
