= Marine Aviation Logistics Squadron 26 =

- MALS-26 Insignia
- Active: 16 June 1952 – present
- Country: United States
- Allegiance: United States of America
- Branch: United States Marine Corps
- Type: Logistics
- Role: Aviation logistics support
- Part of: Marine Aircraft Group 26; 2nd Marine Aircraft Wing
- Garrison/HQ: Marine Corps Air Station New River
- Nickname: Patriots
- Engagements: Operation Iraqi Freedom; Operation Enduring Freedom

Marine Aviation Logistics Squadron 26 (MALS-26) is an aviation logistics support unit of the United States Marine Corps. They are currently based at Marine Corps Air Station New River, North Carolina and fall under the command of Marine Aircraft Group 26 and the 2nd Marine Aircraft Wing.

== Mission ==
Provide aviation logistics support, guidance, planning and direction to Marine Aircraft Group (MAG) squadrons on behalf of the commanding officer, as well as logistics support for Navy-funded equipment in the supporting Marine Wing Support Squadron (MWSS), Marine Air Control Group (MACG), and Marine Aircraft Wing/Mobile Calibration Complex (MAW/MCC).

== History ==
=== Early years ===
On 16 June 1952, Headquarters and Headquarters Squadron 26 (H&HS-26), Marine Corps Air Station Cherry Point, North Carolina, was commissioned. H&HS-26 was redesignated as Headquarters and Maintenance Squadron 26 (H&MS-26) in February 1954. The squadron relocated to Marine Corps Air Station New River, North Carolina and was assigned to Marine Aircraft Group 26, 2nd Marine Aircraft Wing in July 1954.

=== 1960s to 1980s ===
H&MS-26 continued supporting efforts throughout the world. The squadron supported the Cuban Missile Crisis in 1962, Operations Nimbus Star, Moon, and Steam I near Cyprus in 1974, the NEO of American citizens from Beirut, Lebanon in 1982, Operation Urgent Fury in Grenada in 1983 and Operation Praying Mantis in 1988.

In October 1988, H&MS-26 was redesignated as Marine Aviation Logistics Squadron 26 (MALS-26) and consolidated all responsibilities for aviation logistical support (maintenance and supply) in one squadron. In November of the same year, MALS-26 was awarded the Joint Meritorious Unit Award, along with HMM-261, for meritorious achievement in the Persian Gulf while assisting in the destruction of the Sirri and Sassan oil platforms.

=== 1990s ===
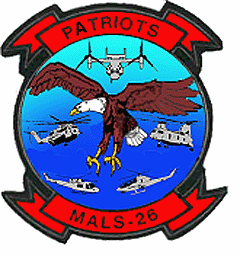
Old MALS-26 logo.

January 1990, a MALS-26 detachment deployed with HMM-264 aboard USS Nassau to support President George H. W. Bush's February visit to Colombia, South America. In March 1990, a MALS-26 detachment deployed with HMM-261 aboard the USS Saipan and in August, participated in Operation Sharp Edge, the evacuation of 1,648 American and foreign nationals from Monrovia, Liberia.

Other operations MALS-26 supported include: Operation Provide Comfort (1991) in Turkey and Iraq, Operation Provide Promise (1992–1993) in Yugoslavia, Operations Deny Flight, Continue Hope, Quickdraw in 1993 and Operation Uphold Democracy in 1994.

=== Global War on Terror ===
In 2003 and 2004, MALS-26 deployed task-organized support for Operation Iraqi Freedom, Operation Enduring Freedom, and Operation Secure Tomorrow.

In January 2005, MALS-26 deployed, in its entirety, in support of Marine Air-Ground Task Force (MAGTF) operations supporting Operation Iraqi Freedom.

In January 2009, MALS-26 deployed in support of Operation Iraqi Freedom and Operation Enduring Freedom.

In support of Operation Iraqi Freedom, MALS-26 responsible for the draw down and closing of AL-ASAD Air Base for the Marines in regards of the draw down of Marine troops in Iraq. In the recently Awards MARADMIN MALS-26 were awarded a NUC (Navy Unit Commendation) for the draw down and removal of the MALS and Marine Corps footprint in Iraq.

On 31 January 2025 the unit adopted the Richlands Elementary School in Onslow County.

== Awards ==
In 1988, H&MS-26 was awarded the Meritorious Unit Commendation for aviation logistics support provided from 1 January to 31 December 1986, during which time H&MS-26 completed more than 105,000 total maintenance actions and processed over 115,000 aviation supply demands in support of garrison and deployed units.

MALS-26 was recognized as MALS of the Year for the 2nd Marine Aircraft Wing in 1992, 1993, 1997, and 1998. In 1992 and 1993, MALS-26 received the Commanding General's Aviation Support Efficiency Trophy. In 1995, MALS-26 was awarded the Secretary of the Navy Award for Achievement in Safety Excellence Ashore and in 1996 received the Commandant's Quality Assurance Award.

== See also ==
- United States Marine Corps Aviation
- Organization of the United States Marine Corps
- List of United States Marine Corps aviation support units
