= Marine Wing Support Group 37 =

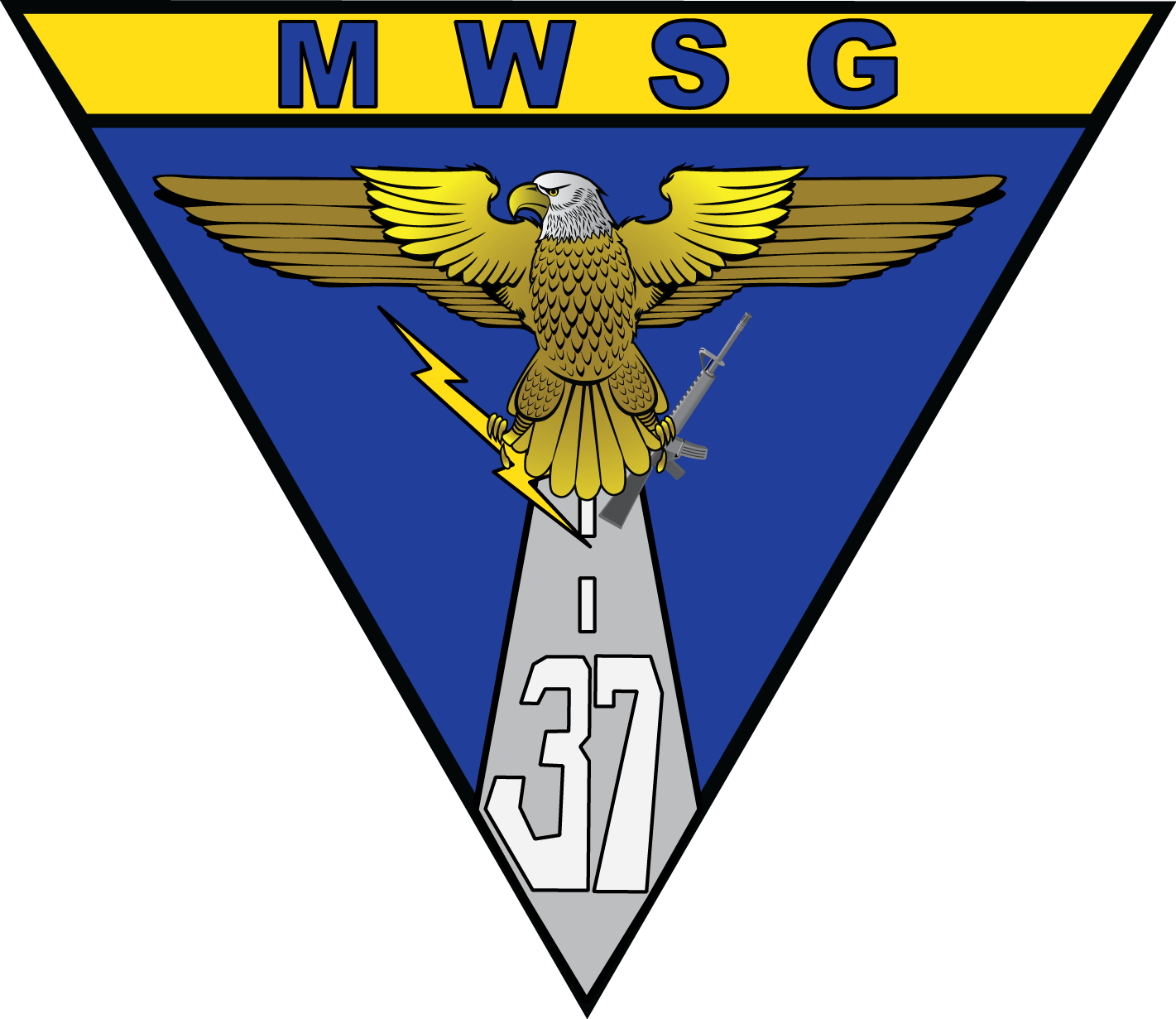
- MWSG-37 insignia
- Active: 1 Jul 1953 – 15 Jun 2012; 29 Nov 2018- 17 Jul 2020
- Country: United States
- Allegiance: United States of America
- Branch: United States Marine Corps
- Role: Aviation combat service support
- Part of: 3rd Marine Aircraft Wing; I Marine Expeditionary Force
- Garrison/HQ: Marine Corps Air Station Miramar
- Engagements: Operation Desert Storm; Operation Enduring Freedom; Operation Iraqi Freedom; 2003 invasion of Iraq

Commanders
- Notable commanders: Colonel Drew D. Doolin

Marine Wing Support Group 37 (MWSG-37) was a United States Marine Corps aviation combat service support unit based at Marine Corps Air Station Miramar that was composed of 4 squadrons, that provided the 3rd Marine Aircraft Wing and I Marine Expeditionary Force with complete airfield operation services (less air traffic control), engineer and transportation support, medical assistance, food services, security support, and other direct combat and combat service support to Aviation Combat elements. MWSG-37 was decommissioned on 15 June 2012 but due to operational requirements were reactivated on 29 November 2018. As part of the Marine Corps' Force Design initiative, MWSG-37 was again decommissioned on 17 July 2020.

== Mission ==
Provide the 3rd Marine Aircraft Wing with organic and deployable combat support and combat service support which is centralized for economy of personnel and equipment.

== Subordinate units ==
- Marine Wing Support Squadron 371
- Marine Wing Support Squadron 372
- Marine Wing Support Squadron 373
- Marine Wing Support Squadron 374

== History ==
The unit was activated on 1 July 1953 at Marine Corps Air Station Miami, Florida as Marine Wing Service Group 37 and was assigned to the 3rd Marine Aircraft Wing. They relocated during September 1955 to Marine Corps Air Station El Toro, California. On 1 April 1967 they were re-designated as Marine Wing Support Group 37.

The Group has participated in Operation Desert Storm, Operation Restore Hope.

The unit relocated during October 1998 to Marine Corps Air Station Miramar, California, through the Base Realignment and Closure (BRAC) process.

They have participated in Operation Enduring Freedom and Operation Iraqi Freedom from March 2003 to present.

Marine Wing Support Group 37 deactivated on 15 June 2012. It was reactivated on 29 November 2018 at Marine Corps Air Station Miramar As part of the re-organization of the Corps, MWSG-37 will be de-activated by 2030.

== Unit awards ==
A unit citation or commendation is an award bestowed upon an organization for the action cited. Members of the unit who participated in said actions are allowed to wear on their uniforms the awarded unit citation. MWSG-37 has been presented with the following awards:

Ribbon	Unit Award
	Navy Unit Commendation
	Meritorious Unit Commendation
	National Defense Service Medal with two Bronze Stars
	Southwest Asia Service Medal with three Bronze Stars
	Iraq Campaign Medal
	Global War on Terrorism Expeditionary Medal
	Global War on Terrorism Service Medal

== See also ==
- Organization of the United States Marine Corps
- List of United States Marine Corps wing support groups
