= Marine Corps Auxiliary Landing Field Bogue =

Coordinates: 34°41′26″N 077°01′47″W

MCALF Bogue
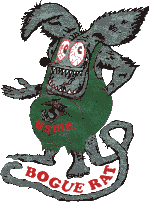
- unofficial Bogue Field logo
- IATA: none; ICAO: KNJM; FAA LID: NJM

Summary
- Airport type: Military
- Owner: United States Department of the Navy
- Operator: United States Marine Corps
- Location: Bogue Sound / Emerald Isle, North Carolina
- Built: 1942
- In use: 1942–Present (Intermittently)
- Occupants: 2nd Marine Aircraft Wing/MWSS-271
- Elevation AMSL: 21 ft (6.4 m)
- Interactive map of MCALF Bogue

Runways
Direction	Length		Surface
Direction	ft	m	Surface
5/23	4,010	1,218	AM-2 Aluminum Matting (non-skid coated)
- Source: Federal Aviation Administration

Marine Corps Auxiliary Landing Field Bogue (ICAO: KNJM, FAA LID: NJM), also known as Bogue Field, is an 875-acre (3.54 km^{2}) landing field located on Bogue Sound (North Carolina) that serves as a Marine Corps’ East Coast site for Field Carrier Landing Practice (FCLP). It is a sub facility of MCAS Cherry Point in Havelock in Craven County and one of three USMC facilities in Carteret County. The others include Atlantic Airfield, a Cherry Point sub installation which is sparsely staffed and Radio Island shipping terminal, between Morehead City and Beaufort, which falls under control of Camp Lejeune, though it is only staffed during active military operations. Another USMC facility, Oak Grove Airfield, near Pollocksville in Jones County, in also controlled by Cherry Point and in rarely staffed unless training is conducted there. By Bogue Field being available for performing many of these landings at night, pilots simulate landing on an aircraft carrier or an amphibious assault ship, which provides the force with the means to forward deploy its aviation assets in order to have a more readily accessible aviation punch for the Marine Air Ground Task Force (MAGTF) commander on the battlefield.

== History ==
When the United States Navy purchased 573 acres (2.32 km^{2}) of land in 1942 for an auxiliary airfield, three 4,000-foot (1,200 m) runways were built for the use of Marine Corps Air Station (MCAS) Cherry Point, North Carolina. Facilities were also constructed to support two squadrons with a combined total of 45 aircraft and accommodations for 1,050 personnel.

=== World War II ===
During World War II, Bogue was used almost exclusively by the United States Marine Corps for VMSB dive-bomber squadron training. Equipped with the SBD Dauntless, the first squadron, VMSB-331, moved to Bogue from MCAS New River in 1943 followed by the three squadrons of Marine Aircraft Group 33 (MAG-33) later that year.

Specialized training facilities were established in the surrounding area to support the training of the resident dive-bombing squadrons. Dive-bombing circle targets were constructed on nearby islands, and vertical targets were built for low-level bombing practice. A maneuvering target boat was also used on the Neuse River to practice attacks on shipping.

MAG-33 transferred to MCAS Eagle Mountain Lake, Texas in 1944, and MAG-93 was commissioned at Oak Grove in the same year. By that point, Marine Corps dive-bombing squadrons were transitioning to the SB2C Helldiver.

A J2F Duck amphibian was assigned to Bogue for the rescue of downed flyers, but proved unsuitable for open-sea landings.

=== Post-war operation ===
Bogue was decommissioned on 15 June 1947 and became an Outlying Field of Cherry Point. The Marines' first Short Airfield for Tactical Support (SATS) system was installed at Bogue in 1958. It was a deployable catapult & arresting system, intended to permit jet aircraft to operate from short expeditionary airfields.

=== Vietnam Era ===
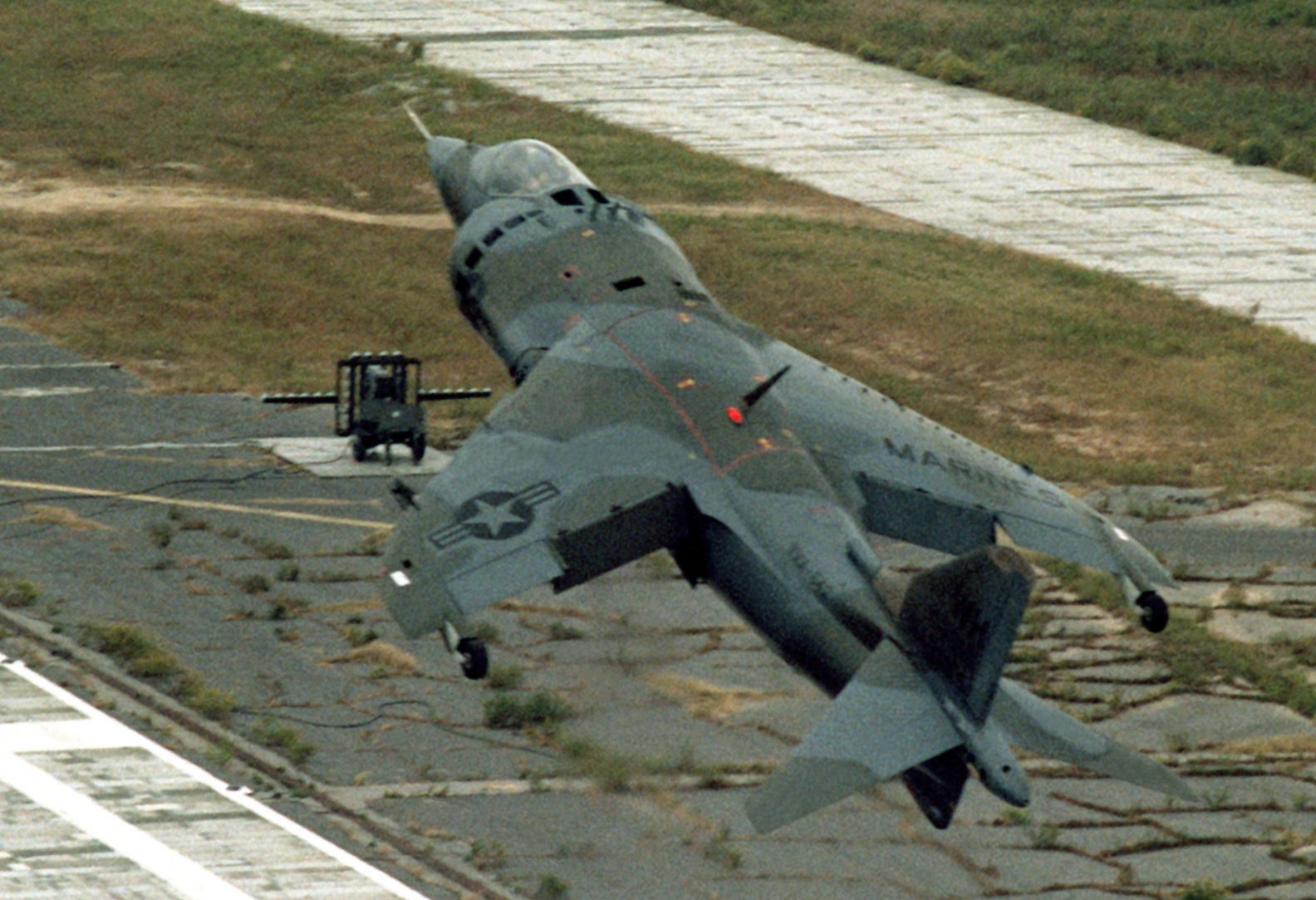
A VMA-231 AV-8A taking off from Bogue, in 1978.

The Marine Corps reopened Bogue (sometime between 1965 and 1976) as a satellite airfield for aircraft & helicopters from MCAS New River & MCAS Cherry Point due to the Vietnam War.

As of 2003, Bogue is still actively used as a satellite airfield with one active runway, along with the painted outline of the deck of an LHA amphibious assault ship, used for carrier landing practice.

MCALF Bogue Field is the primary location for AV-8B Harrier practice operations. It is also used by other locally based USMC aircraft. It supports about 3500 FCLPs (Field Carrier Landing Practice) per training year. Training squadron aircraft take priority over normal traffic while exercises take priority over all other users, including training.

Bogue Field consists of a runway constructed of aluminum panels which can be disassembled and reconstructed anywhere in the world in a matter of days by a specialty construction battalion. The remains of two other runways still exist. The Airport Facility Directory includes the remark, "Runway 18 utilized for catapults only."

Although Bogue Field has no aircraft permanently assigned, it serves as a training facility primarily for AV-8 Harriers from Marine Corps Air Station Cherry Point. However, it is also used for practice approaches by KC-130 Hercules transports from MCAS Cherry Point, F/A-18 Hornet fighters from MCAS Beaufort, South Carolina and helicopters from MCAS New River, North Carolina.

== Bogue Field Committee ==
MCAS Cherry Point has enjoyed a comfortable relationship with the nearby communities of Emerald Isle and Bogue, although area residents have formed a committee to evaluate the impact that MCALF Bogue has on their community. The obvious noise impact on the community is considered by some to be offensive to the citizens living too close to normal flight patterns. In January 2001, a group of residents from Emerald Isle, Swansboro, Cape Carteret, Bogue and Morehead City that have concerns about safety issues of the Harrier noise, quality of life, and accident potential zones, have formed the Bogue Field Committee in an effort to have the federal government properly fund the AV-8 Harrier program so that safety is no longer an issue for the pilots. Since most committee members feel that this is not likely, their goals are now to have the USMC to stop flying the plane over highly populated areas.

== See also ==
- United States Marine Corps Aviation
- List of United States Marine Corps installations
