= 13th Combat Sustainment Support Battalion (United States) =

13th Combat Sustainment Support Battalion (13th CSSB)
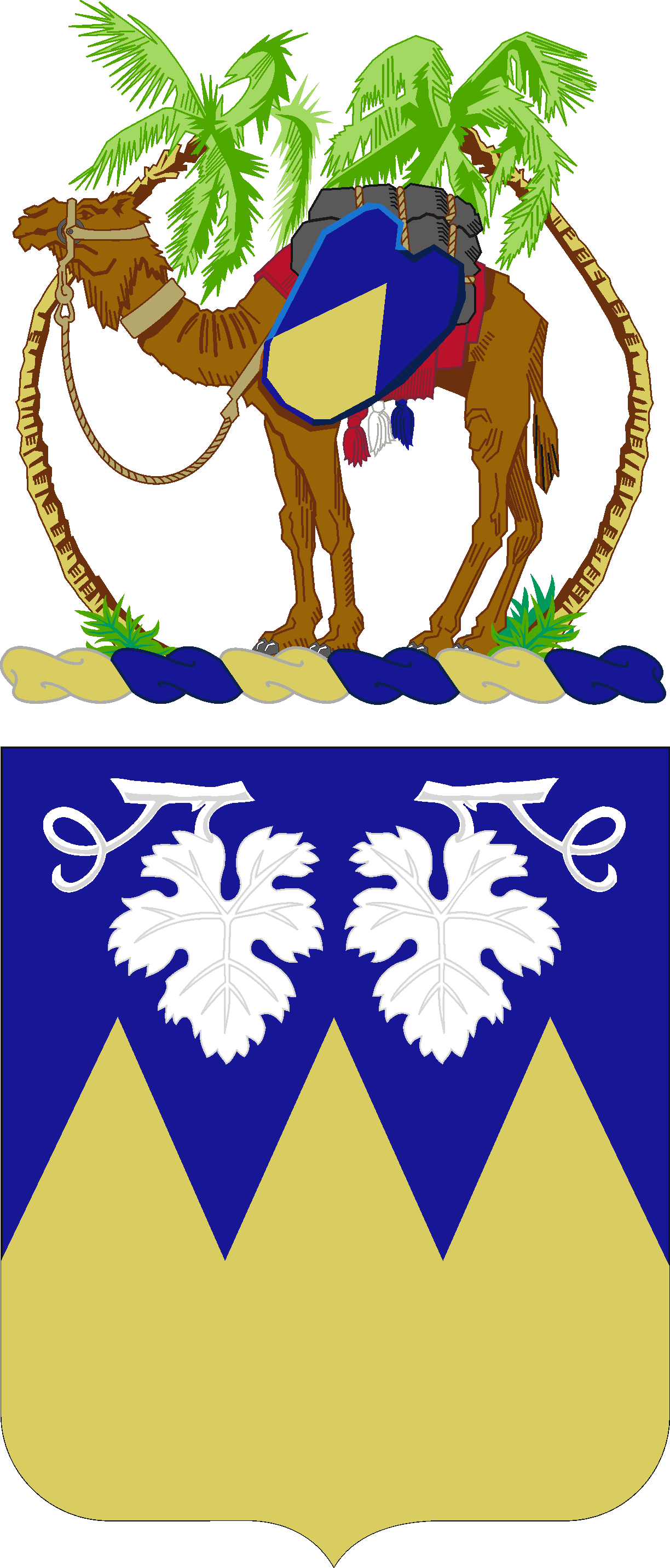
- Coat of arms
- Active: 13 January 1941 – Present
- Country: United States of America
- Allegiance: United States Army
- Branch: Regular Army
- Type: Battalion
- Role: Force sustainment
- Part of: Forces Command
- Garrison/HQ: Fort Lewis
- Nickname: Logistics Pioneers
- Motto: "Find a way"
- Colors: Blue, White, & Silver
- Anniversaries: 13 January 1941

Commanders
- Current commander: LTC Matthew Boersema

Insignia
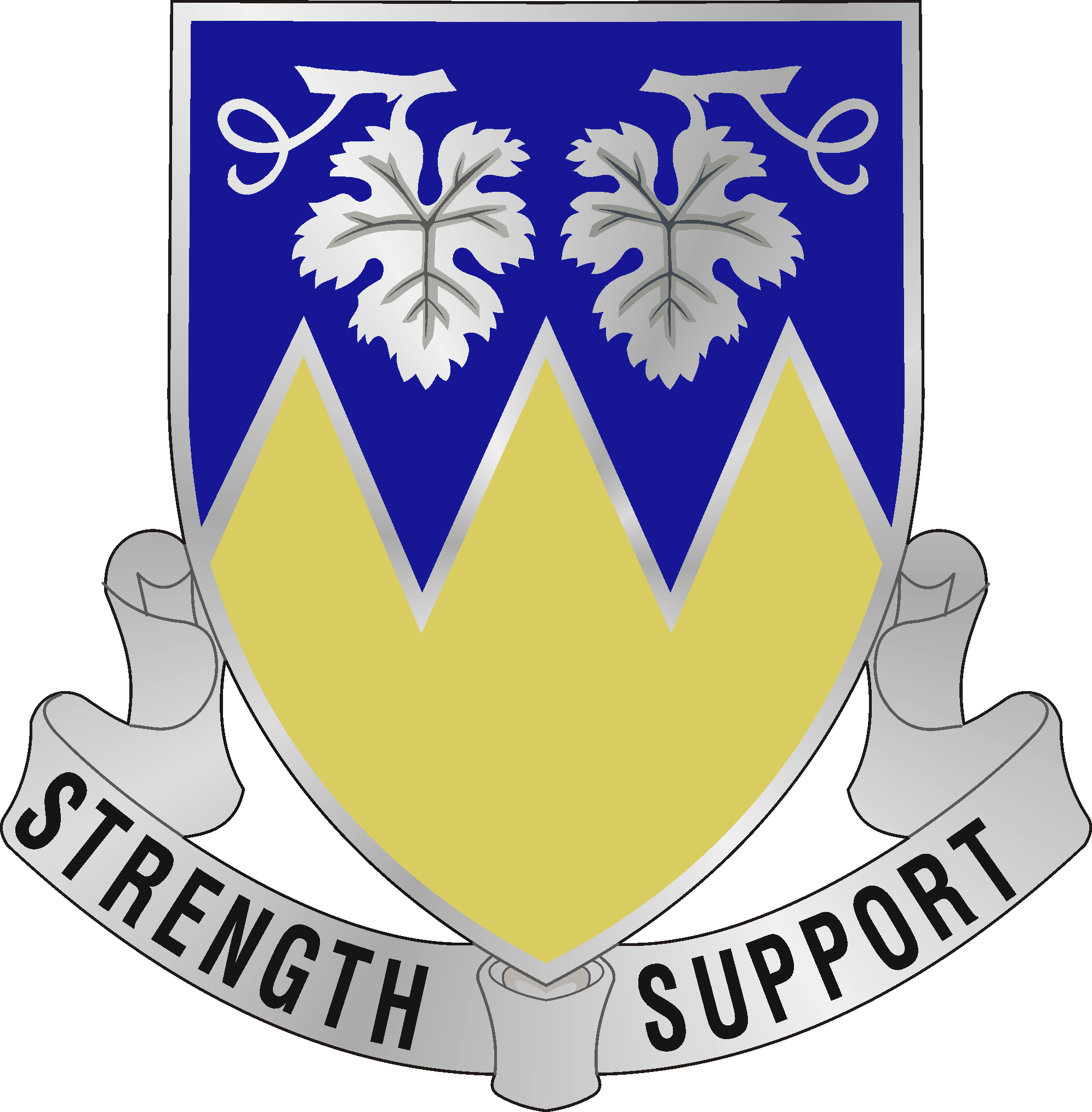
- Distinctive unit insignia

13th Combat Sustainment Support Battalion (13th CSSB) is a modular, corps-level support organization Battalion responsible for providing multifunctional logistics support to maneuver, fires, and effects organizations as well as multifunctional logistics assistance to other support organizations. The 13th CSSB was formerly stationed at Fort Benning, Georgia, and was a subordinate unit of the 3rd Sustainment Brigade. The battalion was deactivated in October 2011 at Ft Benning and reflagged from the former 80th Ordnance Battalion at Joint Base Lewis/McChord. The battalion is now subordinate to the 593rd Expeditionary Sustainment Command.

== History ==
The Headquarters and Headquarters Detachment was constituted on 13 January 1941 in the Regular Army as part of the 60th Quartermaster Battalion (Laundry) and activated on 25 May 1942 at Camp Claiborne, Louisiana. The unit was de-activated on 20 June 1948 in England.

On 18 November 1948, the unit was re-designated as the 13th Quartermaster Battalion and activated 4 January 1949 at Camp Lee, Virginia. The unit was re-designated 1 January 1966 as part of the 13th Supply and Service Battalion, activated 21 October 1977 in Augsburg, Germany and assigned to the 2nd Support Command (Corps).

On 30 October 1981, the battalion was organized under the command and control of the 7th Support Group. On 1 April 1982, the Headquarters and Headquarters Company relocated from Reese Kaserne, Augsburg to Flak Kaserne, Ludwigsburg, Germany. The unit moved to Fort Benning, Georgia on 15 November 1991 and was attached to the 36th Engineer Group (Combat).

The unit participated in World War II in Northern France and Rhineland and in the Korean War. Decorations include: two Meritorious Unit Commendations, embroidered; the Army Superior Unit Award; Korea and Republic of Korea Presidential Unit Citations. The Headquarters and Headquarters Detachment (HHD) deployed to Southwest Asia on 11 December 1990 and returned 7 May 1991. On 16 August 1993, the unit deployed soldiers to Somalia in support of Operation Continue Hope and returned 22 December 1993.

More recently, the detachment has deployed soldiers to Taszár, Hungary in support of Operation Joint Forge, South America in support of Hurricane Mitch relief efforts, Kuwait and Saudi Arabia with Task Force 1–15 for Intrinsic Action. The Headquarters and Headquarters Detachment has recently returned from Kuwait and Iraq where they supported the 42nd Infantry Division during Operation Iraqi Freedom. There the 13th CSSB was augmented by Service Support units from the Tennessee Army National Guard with nine 5k Tankers, 2 ROWPUs, and QM Warehousing Supply skill sets. These forces were among the first to move forward through the Karbala Gap establishing a Refuel on the Move (ROM) site aiding combat forces to successfully invade Bagdad, Iraq. The 13th CSSB was able to provide primary service support to 3rd Infantry and 101st Airborne divisional assets using Tennessee Army National Guard units from sites at Bagdad International Airport. The fuel and water assets proved crucial to establishing what would later become known as the "Green Zone".

During Operation Iraqi Freedom III, the HHD, 13th Corps Support Battalion (CSB) operated out of FOB Speicher, Iraq providing command and control for 11 subordinate units and attachments while planning and supervising the administration, training, and internal logistical support for the battalion. 13th CSB conducted over 3,000 combat logistics patrols logging over 3 million miles, completed over 85 recovery missions, and issued over 26 million US gallons (98,000 m^{3}) of fuel. They also completed 3,094 direct support level maintenance job orders, processed 56,525 material release orders, produced 47.5 million US gallons (180,000 m^{3}) of water, and issued over 4.9 million bottles of water and 1.9 million meals.

On 17 October 2006, the HHD, 13th CSB reflagged as the Headquarters and Headquarters Company (HHC), 13th Combat Sustainment Support Battalion (CSSB) and attached to the 3rd Sustainment Brigade of Fort Stewart, GA. On 27 June 2007, the HHC deployed to LSA Anaconda, Iraq in support of Operation Iraqi Freedom (07–09) providing command and control to ten subordinate units and attachments. During OIF (07–09), 13th CSSB executes logistic support to MNC-I forces by operating the major distribution activities at LSAA, including the Corps Storage Area (CSA), Corps Distribution Center (CDC), Central Receiving and Shipping Point (CRSP), Central Issue Facility (CIF), Aerial Delivery, and Mortuary Affairs Collection Point (MACP). 13th CSSB provides reinforcing maintenance, water, and cargo handling support through forward-echeloned team operating at 11 Forward Operating Bases (FOB) through the Iraqi theater. 13th CSSB provided CSS training to Iraqi Security Forces to support the transition to national Iraqi control (Logistics Transition Teams).

In October 2011 the unit relocated from Fort Benning, GA to Joint Base Lewis-McChord, WA.

== Honors ==
=== Unit decorations ===
Ribbon	Award
	Meritorious Unit Commendation
	Army Superior Unit Award

=== Campaigns ===
Conflict	Streamer
World War II	Northern France
World War II	Rhineland
Korean War	Summer Offensive of 1953
Vietnam War	Southwest Asia
Persian Gulf War	Operation Desert Storm, Operation Desert Shield
Global war on terror	Operation Iraqi Freedom

== Subordinate units ==
- Headquarters and Headquarters Company (HHC)

HHC Commander Captain Jeremy D. Reed November 2019 - June 2021

- 21st Transportation Company (Inland Cargo Transfer Company)
- 24th Composite Supply Company
- 63rd Ordnance Company (Ammo)
- 140th Transportation Detachment (Movement Control Team)
- 513th Transportation Company (Medium Truck)
- 523rd Transportation Company (Composite Truck Company)
- 542nd Ordnance Company (Support Maintenance)
- 564th Quartermaster Company (Field Feeding)

== Battalion Commanders ==
- Lieutenant Colonel Murray "Spike" Rupert, May 1992 – May 1994
- Lieutenant Colonel Michael Ramirez, May 1994 – April 1996
- Lieutenant Colonel Gerald Bates Jr., April 1996 – May 1997
- Lieutenant Colonel Michael G. Bettez, May 1997 – May 1999
- Lieutenant Colonel Anthony Swain, May 1999 – April 2001
- Lieutenant Colonel Scott D. Fabozzi, April 2001 – June 2003
- Lieutenant Colonel Matthew T. Higginbotham, June 2003 – May 2006
- Lieutenant Colonel Timothy Sullivan, May 2006 – September 2008
- Lieutenant Colonel Anthony P. Bohn, September 2008 – October 2011
- Lieutenant Colonel Katherine J. Graef, October 2011 – June 2012
- Lieutenant Colonel R. Douglas Henry, June 2012 – June 2014
- Lieutenant Colonel Charles W. Ward, June 2014 – June 2016
- Lieutenant Colonel James Zacchino Jr., June 2016 - June 2018
- Lieutenant Colonel Casey J. Holler, June 2018 - June 2020
- Lieutenant Colonel Alan R. Fowler, June 2020 - 10 June 2022
- Lieutenant Colonel Jeffrey W. Buckner, 10 June 2022 - 10 May 2024
- Lieutenant Colonel Eric Baca, 10 May 2024 - 21 April 2026
- Leiutenant Colonel Matthew Boersema, 21 April 2026 - Current

== Command Sergeants-Major ==
- Command Sergeant Major Wood, February 1994 – April 1996
- Command Sergeant Major Saunders, April 1996 – May 1997
- Command Sergeant Major Robert Spates, May 1997 – May 1999
- Command Sergeant Major Gary Camper, May 1999 – February 2001
- Command Sergeant Major Rickey J. Talley, April 2001 – September 2006
- Command Sergeant Major Stanley O. Richards, September 2007 – October 2011
- Command Sergeant Major Terry E. Moten, October 2011 – May 2013
- Command Sergeant Major Robert E. Townes, June 2013 – June 2015
- Command Sergeant Major Loneal Blevins Jr., June 2015 – May 2017
- Command Sergeant Major Scott Howerton, May 2017 - August 2019
- Command Sergeant Major Elfonso Green, August 2019 - August 2021
- Command Sergeant Major Errol Brooks, September 2021 - December 2023
- Command Sergeant Major Khalid Ibrahim, December 2023 - November 2025
- Command Sergeant Major Jose Graulau, November 2025 - Acting
