= Marine Wing Support Group 47 =

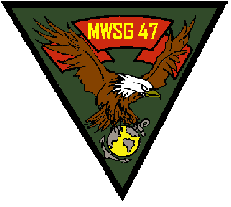
- MWSG-47 insignia
- Country: United States
- Allegiance: United States of America
- Branch: United States Marine Corps
- Role: Aviation combat service support
- Part of: 4th Marine Aircraft Wing; Marine Forces Reserve
- Garrison/HQ: Selfridge Air National Guard Base
- Engagements: Operation Desert Storm; Global war on terrorism; Operation Enduring Freedom; Operation Iraqi Freedom

Marine Wing Support Group 47 (MWSG-47) was a United States Marine Corps aviation combat service support unit based at Selfridge Air National Guard Base, Michigan that was composed of three squadrons, that provided the 4th Marine Aircraft Wing and Marine Forces Reserve with complete airfield operation services (less air traffic control), engineer and transportation support, medical assistance, food services, security support, and other direct combat service support to aviation combat elements.

== Mission ==
Provide the 4th Marine Aircraft Wing with organic and deployable combat support and combat service support which is centralized for economy of personnel and equipment. MWSG 47 was decommissioned in 2012, and its subordinate units reassigned to various Marine Aircraft groups (MAG).

== Subordinate units ==
Name	Location
Marine Wing Support Squadron 471	Minneapolis, Minnesota
:MWSS -471 Det A	Johnstown, PA
:MWSS -471 Det B	Selfridge ANGB, MI
Marine Wing Support Squadron 472	Joint Base McGuire–Dix–Lakehurst
:MWSS -472 Det A	Wyoming, PA
:MWSS -472 Det B	Chicopee, MA
Marine Wing Support Squadron 473	Marine Corps Air Station Miramar
:MWSS-473 Det A	Fresno, California
:MWSS-473 Det B	NASJRB Fort Worth

== History ==
Marine Wing Support Group 47 (MWSG-47) was activated on 1 July 1962 at Naval Air Station Los Alamitos, CA. Its mission, to provide all aviation ground support for fixed and rotary wing units of the 4th Marine Aircraft Wing. The official designation was Marine Wing Support Group 47, Marine Air Reserve Training Unit, Marine Air Reserve Training Command, 4th Marine Aircraft Wing, U. S. Marine Corps Reserve. On 1 October 1965, the command was relocated to Naval Air Station Twin Cities, Minneapolis, MN. At the time, the Group was composed of two squadrons, Wing Engineer Squadron 47 (WES-47) and Wing Transportation Squadron 47 (WTS-47). These squadrons in turn comprised numerous detachments scattered across the United States.

On 1 October 1977, MWSG-47 was again relocated; this time to Selfridge Air National Guard Base, Mt. Clemens, MI. Marines had been present at Selfridge since 20 April 1968, when the Marine Air Reserve Training Detachment (MARTD) supporting OV-10, UH-34 and CH-46 airframes arrived from its previous site a few miles downriver at Naval Air Station Grosse Ile pending its closure in 1969. The MARTD was renamed a Marine Air Reserve Training Unit (MARTU) and still later it was re-designated as Headquarters & Ground Maintenance Squadron 47 (H&GMS-47), another squadron assigned to MWSG-47. At this time the Group comprised approximately 1105 Marines at five sites.

In 1986, the Marine Corps began a reorganization of the aviation ground support (AGS) community. Marine Air Base Squadrons, up until then a part of the command structure of the Marine Corps Air Station, were transferred to the MWSGs. The MWSG was then restructured. The most significant change involved the creation of the Marine Wing Support Squadron. The mission of the new MWSS was to perform all of the AGS functions that were spread between the various squadrons that were being eliminated; the WES, WTS, MABS and H&GMS. Furthermore, the MWSSs were task organized to support either rotary wing (RW) or fixed wing (FW) flying squadrons. This change took additional time to complete in the Marine Corps Reserve, but by 1 October 1988 it was done and MWSG-47 comprised H&HS-47, MWSS-471(FW), MWSS-472(RW), MWSS-473(FW) and MWSS-474(RW). The Group had over 2500 Marines scattered across 14 sites.

In January 1994, MWSG-47 oversaw further changes in locations of its subordinate commands. The Base Realignment and Closure Commission (BRAC) reports of 1991 and 1993 caused the movement of the MWSS headquarters detachments to the same geographic locations of the four Marine Aircraft Groups (MAGs) they supported. These changes were designed to make command and control relationships between the effected commands easier. During FY-2002, MWSG-47 was again reorganized. This included the deactivation of MWSS-474 and the re-flagging of other detachments. During this reorganization some squadron detachments were transferred to other major subordinate commands within Marine Forces Reserve and some were gained. At this time the designation for specific support to fixed or rotary wing squadrons was dropped. When the dust settled, MWSG-47 was left with Marines at nine sites across the United States.

In 2010, the Marine Corps Force Structure Review Group submitted the recommendation that all MWSGs, active and reserve, be deactivated and their subordinate MWSSs reassigned to the MAGs they support. This recommendation led to MWSS-471 and MWSS-473 transferring to MAG-41 and MWSS-472 transferring to MAG-49 in 2012. When the MWSS transfers were complete, the deactivation of Marine Wing Support Group 47 occurred in July, 2012, concluding 50 years of service.

== Deployment History ==
Despite large scale operations in Vietnam, national command authority decisions resulted in no Marine reserve unit mobilizations for that conflict; though numerous Marine reservists did volunteer and deploy for service there. In December 1990, Operation Desert Shield brought the first unit mobilizations ever to MWSG-47. These mobilizations continued through January 1991 and included task organized detachments of hundreds of Marines from across the Group and also approximately 32 individuals from the Group headquarters. They served in both CONUS and OCONUS locations, including Operation Desert Storm. The vast majority of these mobilized reservists had deactivated by July 1991.

Mobilizations occurred again in January 2003 during the force build up for the invasion of Iraq. MWSG-47 was mobilized to support west coast Marine air operations as MWSG-37 was forward deployed. MWSS-471 was mobilized to support the proposed northern invasion route of Iraq. When this plan was cancelled, the squadron was left at MCAS New River to backfill for the absence of a deployed MWSS-272. MWSS-473 was mobilized to support operations at MCAS Yuma and MCAS Miramar.

After the invasion phase of Operation Iraqi Freedom (OIF) was complete, all mobilized reservists were returned to their home training centers by November 2003. Further deployments occurred over the next few years to Iraq; MWSS-472 in 2005, MWSS-473 in 2007 and MWSS-472 again in 2009. In 2004, a detachment of Marines from MWSS-471 was sent to Afghanistan for Operation Enduring Freedom (OEF). And in 2008, MWSS-471 deployed to Djibouti to support Combined Joint Task Force – Horn of Africa. Other small detachments deployed overseas during this period as well. From 2003 to 2010, numerous individuals from the headquarters of MWSG-47 volunteered to deploy with the squadrons and as individual augments to Marine Corps active duty units.

== Other Training Deployments ==
Over the decades, MWSG-47 has participated in numerous training exercises and operations across the globe that supported the United States Department of Defense or Department of State interests. Some of the places that MWSG-47 Marines have been deployed include: Bahamas, Bahrain, Bermuda, Bulgaria, Dominican Republic, Egypt, Honduras, Norway, Peru, Romania and Ukraine. Exercises that were supported include Battle Griffin, Beyond The Horizon, Black Sea Rotation Force, Bright Star and New Horizons.

== Unit Insignia ==
MWSG-47 has had four unit insignias throughout its existence; unfortunately the first has been lost to history. The second insignia was designed when the command was moved from Los Alamitos, CA to Minneapolis, MN. At that time a triangular insignia was designed and adopted. The light blue triangle denoted the trinity of the Marine Corps’ philosophy of land, sea and air operations and our Naval heritage. At the top of the triangle was a rendition in silver of the North Star, symbolizing that Minneapolis was the most northern Marine Corps aviation command. Below the star were the gold numerals “47” and then two silver arcs which symbolized the Northern Lights encompassing the locations of the Group’s major subordinate commands at Whidbey Island, WA, Minneapolis, MN, Green Bay, WI, Detroit, MI and South Weymouth, MA. Below the arcs, were the gold letters of “MWSG” on a scarlet background.

The third insignia originated when all Marine Corps aviation Groups redesigned their insignias to inverted triangles. The new insignia began with a green triangle and had a bald eagle with up stretched wings grasping a globe and anchor in a stylized rendition of the Marine Corps insignia. An arcing scarlet banner emblazoned with “MWSG 47” in golden letters was placed in the background of the eagle’s wings. The fourth and final insignia, adopted in 2011, is also an inverted triangle. Across the top is a black strip with golden letters spelling “MARINE WING SUPPORT GROUP”. Centered vertically on a scarlet background is a green runway with white markings and the white numerals “47”. The last portion of the insignia is a depiction of a bald eagle (viewed from its right side) gliding to a landing on the runway.

== Unit Awards ==
1. Meritorious Unit Commendation Streamer w/bronze star a. 1990-1991 b. 2003-2004 2. National Defense Service Streamer w/bronze star a. 1990-1991 b. 2003-2004 3. Commandant of the Marine Corps Certificate of Commendation a. 1983-1987

== Commanding Officers ==
Colonel BAUMAN, George F. 01 Jan 1968 – 20 Jul 1968 Colonel FOSS, Donald H. 21 Jul 1968 – 28 Feb 1970 Lieutenant Colonel SNIDER, Howard L. 01 Mar 1970 – 11 Sep 1970 Colonel FIEGENER, Kenneth G. 12 Sep 1970 – 31 Dec 1970 Colonel McCABE, Lyle S. 01 Oct 1971 – 06 Oct 1973 Colonel WOOLSEY, Blair D. 07 Oct 1973 – 12 Sep 1975 Colonel SULLIVAN, Eugene G. 15 Sep 1975 – 12 Nov 1977 Colonel ROBSON, Jon R. 13 Nov 1977 – 21 Jun 1980 Colonel HAWES, Richard E. 22 Jun 1980 – 20 Jun 1982 Colonel STIEGMAN, Donald L. 21 Jun 1982 – 13 Jul 1985 Colonel KALATA, Richard J. 14 Jul 1985 – 04 Jun 1988 Colonel CHURCH, John C. 05 Jul 1988 – 08 Sep 1990 Colonel MEGONIGAL, Walter F. 09 Sep 1990 – 11 Jul 1992 Colonel GEE, David M. 12 Jul 1992 – 10 Nov 1993 Lieutenant Colonel BAIRLEY, Kenneth J. 11 Nov 1993 – 03 Apr 1994 Colonel WILLIAMS, Leo V. 04 Apr 1994 – 24 Jun 1994 Colonel WELLS, David M. 24 Jun 1994 – 22 Jun 1996 Colonel CLEMMER, Wayne A. 22 Jun 1996 – 12 Jul 1998 Colonel JEPSEN, Norman W. 12 Jul 1998 – 16 July 2000 Colonel JOYCE, Christopher K. 17 July 2000 – 20 July 2002 Colonel RECTOR, George E. 20 July 2002 – 25 July 2004 Colonel POTWIN, Albert 25 July 2004 – 9 July 2006 Colonel ARDOVINO, Anthony 10 July 2006 – 12 July 2008 Colonel STEELE, Wayne R. 12 July 2008 – 10 July 2010 Colonel HAHN, John R. 10 July 2010 – 15 July 2012

== Sergeants Major ==
Master Sergeant HUTH, G. T. Jan 1975 – Feb 1975 Sergeant Major ROSS, A. L. Feb 1975 – Dec 1975 First Sergeant CHANDLER Jr., C. M. Jan 1978 – Dec 1978 Sergeant Major WESLEY, H. A. Jan 1980 – Jun 1980 Sergeant Major BURKE, D. Jun 1980 – Nov 1981 Sergeant Major GEERS, Ronald J. Dec 1981 – Oct 1983* Sergeant Major BROWN, Charles G. Jan 1984 – Aug 1986 Sergeant Major ALTIZER, Kenneth S. Aug 1986 – Dec 1988 Sergeant Major TATE, John W. Jun 1989 – Feb 1991 Sergeant Major BUNTING, G. L. Feb 1991 – Apr 1993 Sergeant Major CUMMINGS, D. E. May 1993 – May 1994 Sergeant Major ROLAND, R. O. May 1994 – Jun 1996 Sergeant Major JOHNSON, Donald J. Jul 1996 – Sep 2000 Sergeant Major BRAINARD May 1997 – Dec 2001 Sergeant Major GARNER, Tyrone A. Sep 2000 – May 2003 Sergeant Major KAY, William I. Jun 2003 – Jun 2005 Sergeant Major ANICK, Robert D. Jun 2004 – Dec 2005 Sergeant Major JOHNSON, Oneal Jun 2005 – Apr 2008 Sergeant Major NEELEY, Randy May 2008 – Apr 2011 Sergeant Major LAMAR, Timothy P. Aug 2007 – Jun 2012 Sergeant Major MINGLEDORFF, Jeffery A. Sep 2011 – Jul 2012

- Died in office, cancer.

== See also ==
- United States Marine Corps Aviation
- Organization of the United States Marine Corps
- List of United States Marine Corps aviation support units
