= Marine Wing Support Squadron 273 =

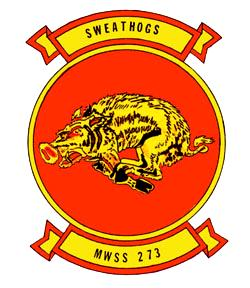
- MWSS 273 insignia
- Country: United States
- Branch: United States Marine Corps
- Type: Aviation ground support squadron
- Part of: Marine Air Control Group 28; 2nd Marine Aircraft Wing
- Garrison/HQ: Marine Corps Air Station Beaufort
- Nickname: Sweathogs
- Motto: "Send in the Sweathogs!" “Send Em’!”
- Engagements: Operation Desert Storm; Operation Allied Force; War in Afghanistan (2001–2021); Iraq War

Commanders
- Commanding Officer: LtCol Jesse D. Johnson
- Executive Officer: Maj Stephen J. Caruana
- Senior Enlisted Leader: SgtMaj Jeremiah P. Bergeron

Marine Wing Support Squadron 273 (MWSS-273) is an aviation ground support unit of the United States Marine Corps. The squadron is based out of Marine Corps Air Station Beaufort, South Carolina and falls under the command of Marine Air Control Group 28 and the 2nd Marine Aircraft Wing. MWSS-273 has supported Marine Corps aviation operations around the world to include during the Gulf War and multiple combat tours in Iraq and Afghanistan.

== Mission ==
Provide limited aviation ground support to enable a composite Marine Aircraft Group (MAG) and supporting or attached elements of the Marine Air Control Group (MACG) to conduct expeditionary operations.

== History ==
=== Commissioning and the 1980s ===
MWSS-273 was commissioned on June 13, 1986, at Marine Corps Air Station Beaufort, South Carolina. The squadron was formed from elements of Marine Air Base Squadron 31, and Detachment Bravo, Marine Wing Support Group 27.

In 1989, MWSS-273 provided extensive disaster relief support to the city of Charleston, South Carolina, during the aftermath of Hurricane Hugo.

=== The Gulf War & the 1990s ===
During The Persian Gulf War in 1991, Marines were reassigned from MWSS-272 and MWSS-274 to augment the squadron which was deployed in December 1990 and played a direct role in providing aviation ground support for UN forces conducting combat operations against Iraq. The Marines of MWSS-273 assisted in the construction of the largest expeditionary airfield in Marine Corps history at Al Khanjar, Saudi Arabia, in addition to several other major construction and transportation projects located at Ras Al Jubail, Ras Mishab, and on the Kuwait/Saudi Arabian border located at "LoneSome Dove". While conducting unit activities at Ras Mishab, the squadron received numerous FROG missile attacks from Iraqi enemy units located north of Ras Al Khafji during the first days of the "Air War Campaign".

Throughout the 1990s, the squadron provided extensive operational support for Aviano Air Base, Italy, NATO contingency operations Deny Flight and Provide Promise, Operation Uphold Democracy in Haiti, Operation Joint Forge in the Balkans, Operation Allied Force and Joint Task Force Noble Anvil in Taszar, Hungary, and numerous Marine Expeditionary Units. MWSS-273 has also provided support personnel for the ongoing Operation Enduring Freedom taking place in Afghanistan.

=== Iraq and Afghanistan ===
MWSS-273 deployed twice in squadron strength to Iraq in support of Operation Iraqi Freedom. The "Sweathogs" conducted 24-hour Aviation Ground Support operations at Al Asad Airbase, the Forward Operating Base at Al Qa'im and the Forward Arming and Refueling Point Mudayasis. During the squadron's last deployment to Iraq it was responsible for the tactical recovery of an unprecedented seven Coalition Aircraft. In only seven months, MWSS-273 provided over 28 million gallons of fuel to Coalition aircraft, conducted over 275,000 miles (443,000 km) of motor transport operations, rendered safe 126 enemy explosive devices, destroyed ten enemy weapons caches, conducted over 11,000 hours of heavy equipment operations, two water main repairs, and four outside-the-wire construction missions to improve living conditions at local Combat Outposts.

From March to September 2012, MWSS-273 deployed to Helmand Province, Afghanistan, in support of Operation Enduring Freedom. The Squadron: provided over 9 million gallons of fuel to over 25,000 aircraft and 2500 ground vehicles; built the largest High Power Run-Up in Marine Corps history; executed two aircraft recoveries including the first-ever combat recovery of an MV-22B Osprey; executed numerous Combat Logistics Patrols; constructed an air-site at Combat Outpost (COP) Shukvani; and prepared 1.78 million square feet of Aluminum Matting 2nd Generation for redeployment – all while providing first-class Aviation Ground Support to seven different air sites. As a result of these efforts, MWSS-273 earned three awards: Marine Corps Aviation Association's 2012 James E. Hatch Marine Wing Support Squadron of the Year; Marine Corps Engineer Association Engineer Company of the Year; and the American Petroleum Institute Tactical Unit of the Year.

== Awards ==
Unit Awards include the Navy Commendation Streamer, the National Defense Service Streamer, and the Southwest Asia Streamer with three bronze stars. MWSS-273 earned the James E. Hatch Marine Wing Support Squadron of the Year five times: 2000, 2005, 2007 and 2009, and 2012.

- Navy Unit Commendation Streamer
- National Defense Service Streamer
- Southwest Asia Service Streamer with three Bronze stars

== See also ==
- United States Marine Corps Aviation
- Organization of the United States Marine Corps
- List of United States Marine Corps aviation support units
