= Marine Wing Support Squadron 271 =

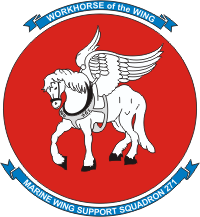
- MWSS-271's insignia courtesy of www.military-graphics.com
- Active: 4 June 1986 – present
- Country: United States
- Allegiance: United States of America
- Branch: United States Marine Corps
- Type: Aviation ground support squadron
- Part of: Marine Wing Support Group 27; 2nd Marine Aircraft Wing
- Garrison/HQ: Marine Corps Air Station Cherry Point
- Nickname(s): Workhorse
- Motto(s): "Workhorse of the Wing"
- Engagements: Operation Desert Storm; Operation Iraqi Freedom

Commanders
- Commanding Officer: LtCol. Jeffrey C. Castiglione
- Executive Officer: Maj. Brittany R. Fayos
- Sergeant Major: SgtMaj. Kevin P. Cain

Marine Wing Support Squadron 271 (MWSS 271) is an aviation ground support unit of the United States Marine Corps. They are based at Marine Corps Air Station Cherry Point, North Carolina. The squadron falls under the command of Marine Aircraft Group 14 and the 2nd Marine Aircraft Wing.

== Mission ==
MWSS-271 provides essential aviation ground support to the Aviation Combat Element (ACE) and all supporting or attached elements of a composite Marine Aircraft Group.

== History ==
Marine Wing Support Squadron 271 was activated on 4 June 1986, organized from the assets of Wing Transportation Squadron 27, Wing Engineer Squadron 27, and Marine Air Base Squadron 14. At its inception, MWSS-271 initially fell under the command structure of Marine Wing Support Group 27, alongside fellow units MWSS-272, MWSS-273, and MWSS-274.

=== The Gulf War ===
Since its inception, the "Workhorses" of MWSS-271 have supported both fixed-wing and rotary-wing aircraft of the 2nd Marine Aircraft Wing on a daily basis and have participated in many major USMC and joint service exercises and operations. MWSS-271 deployed to Saudi Arabia, in January 1991 in support of Operation Desert Shield and Operation Desert Storm. The Squadron provided Aviation Ground Support to multiple Marine Air Groups by constructing and operating Forward Arming and Refueling Points at Al Kabrit, Qahar, Khanjar, and Tanijib, Saudi Arabia. On 24 February 1991, MWSS 271 displaced its elements in support of offensive ground combat operations into Kuwait in the midst of heavy combat to establish a Forward Operating Base at Ahmed Al Jaber Air Base and, eventually, Kuwait International Airport, becoming the only MWSS to take part in offensive combat operations in Kuwait during Desert Storm.

The last elements of the Squadron returned to the United States on 15 June 1991 and rapidly resumed peace-time operations to provide Aviation Ground Support (AGS) for the 2nd Marine Aircraft Wing at MCAS Cherry Point and at Marine Corps Auxiliary Landing Field Bogue (MCALF Bogue), North Carolina.

=== The 1990s ===
MWSS-271 operations at MCALF Bogue have supported continuous expeditionary training and flight operations for the 2nd Marine Aircraft Wing and U.S. Special Forces units by providing a unique nucleus of uninterrupted services, such as air base operations, crash fire rescue, aircraft recovery, security, weather, communications, tactical aircraft refueling, motor transport, engineers, and food services. It is one of two continuously operational Expeditionary Airfields within the United States and the only one on the East Coast.

=== The Global War on Terror ===
In February 2003, MWSS-271 returned to the Middle East in support of Operation Iraqi Freedom (OIF). Deploying to Kuwait, the squadron quickly established Camp Workhorse, which was eventually used as the staging area for all 3rd Marine Aircraft Wing ground units before they crossed over into Iraq during OIF. By the end of combat operations, MWSS-271 had provided vital AGS in direct support of ground combat operations from Kuwait to the gates of Baghdad and beyond. While supporting the combat operations deep into Iraq, MWSS-271 provided five FARPs, three on the way to Baghdad and two further north, which finally ended in Tikrit, the home of Saddam Hussein. Also during this period, the MWSS-271 established two Forward Operating Bases to support operations: one a KC-130 TLZ that supported both aviation and division operations, and the other a fully functional and operational FOB that could support every aircraft in the Marine Corps inventory.

The Workhorses again deployed in support of OIF at the beginning of 2005. By providing aviation ground support and combat service support at Al Asad, Al Qaim, and Kalsu from January 2005 through September 2005, the Squadron enhanced operational capabilities for Marine, Joint, and Coalition air and ground forces within the Al Anbar area of operations. Throughout the deployment, the Squadron performed Aviation Ground Support and non-doctrinal combat service support missions while providing vital base security and convoy support. The Workhorses supported combat operations in conjunction with Regimental Combat Team 2 and provided necessary explosive ordnance disposal response to neutralize improvised explosive devices and weapons caches.

In 2009, MWSS-271 was deployed to Iraq in support of combat operations.

From January to March 2011 MWSS-271 was attached to the USS Gunston Hall in support of Southern Partnership Station 2011 in Central and South America.

In 2012, Marine Wing Support Group 27 was deactivated, and MWSS-271 was transferred to Marine Aircraft Group 14.

From March to October 2013 MWSS-271 deployed a detachment to Helmand Province in Afghanistan in support of combat operations during Operation Enduring Freedom.

== Awards ==
- Presidential Unit Citation
- Joint Meritorious Unit Award w/ 1 bronze oak leaf

Haiti 1997

- Navy Unit Commendation
- National Defense Service Streamer w/ 3 bronze stars
- Armed Forces Service Medal

Haiti 1997

- Southwest Asia Service Streamer w/ 3 bronze stars
- Afghsnistan Campaign Streamer w/ 1 bronze star
- Iraq Campaign Streamer w/ 3 bronze stars
- Global War on Terrorism Service Streamer
- Global War on Terrorism Expeditionary Streamer

== See also ==
- United States Marine Corps Aviation
- Organization of the United States Marine Corps
- List of United States Marine Corps aviation support units
