= Marine Corps Air Station New River =

Military base in North Carolina, US

- McCutcheon Field
- Near Jacksonville, North Carolina in the United States
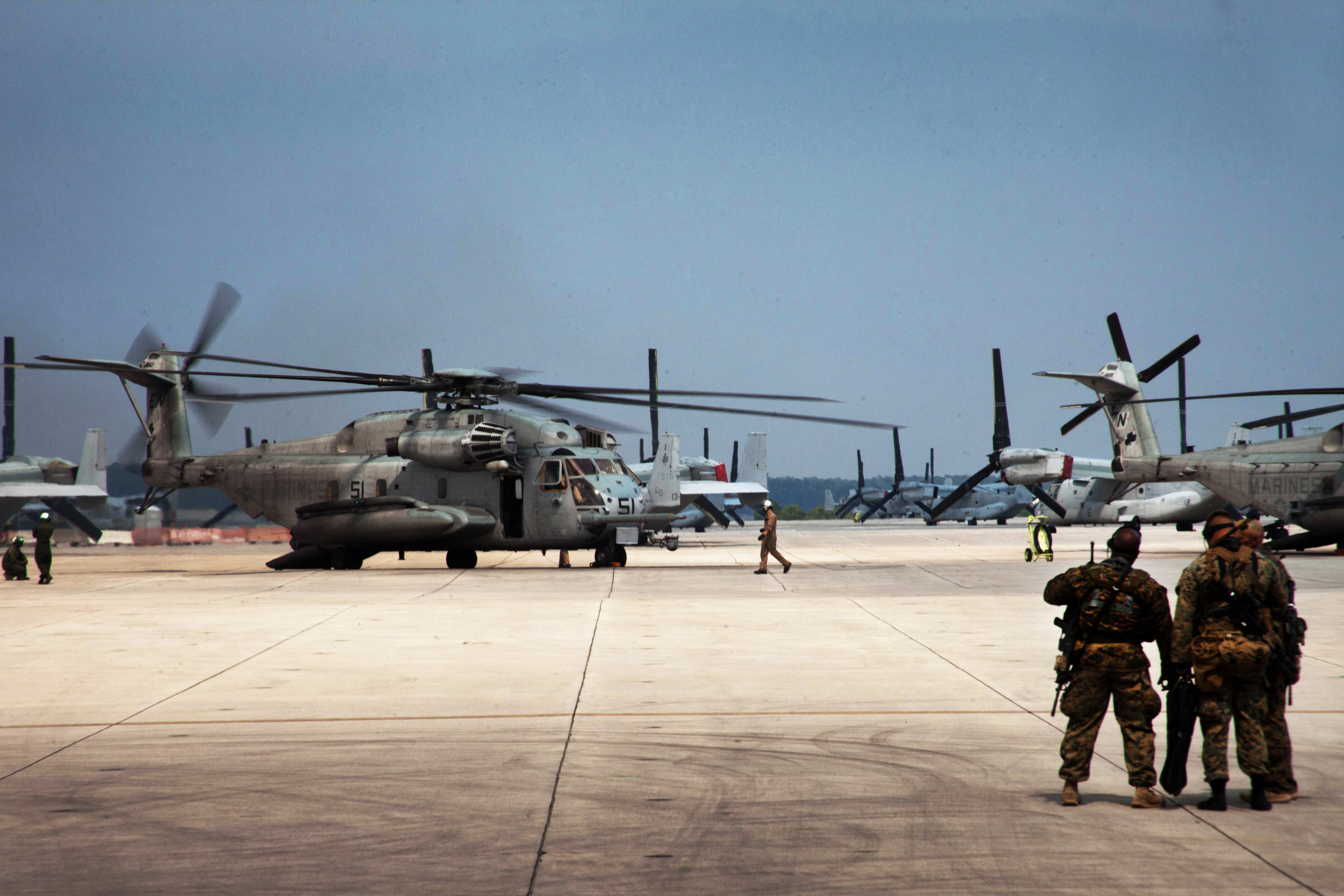
- CH-53E Super Stallion and MV-22B Osprey aircraft on the flight-line at MCAS New River.

Site information
- Type: Marine Corps Air Station
- Owner: Department of Defense
- Operator: US Marine Corps
- Controlled by: Marine Corps Installations – East
- Condition: Operational
- Website: www.newriver.marines.mil

Location
- Location in the United States
- Coordinates: 34°42′26″N 077°26′43″W

Site history
- Built: 1943
- In use: 1943 – present

Garrison information
- Current commander: Colonel Garth W. Burnett
- Garrison: 2nd Marine Aircraft Wing

Airfield information
- Identifiers: ICAO: KNCA, FAA LID: NCA, WMO: 723096
- Elevation: 7.9 metres (26 ft) AMSL
Runways
Direction	Length and surface
5/23	1,562.7 metres (5,127 ft) Asphalt
1/19	1,459.6 metres (4,789 ft) Asphalt

Marine Corps Air Station New River (ICAO: KNCA, FAA LID: NCA) is a United States Marine Corps helicopter and tilt-rotor base in Jacksonville, North Carolina, in the eastern part of the state. In 1972, the airfield was named McCutcheon Field for General Keith B. McCutcheon, one of the fathers of Marine Corps helicopter aviation. Near Marine Corps Base Camp Lejeune, it shares some facilities with Camp Geiger.

== History ==
The base was originally 29 parcels of land, a simple stretch of tobacco farm that was purchased for $64,502 in 1941. Officials at Camp Lejeune investigated the area in search of an existing airfield for hosting aircraft in support of amphibious operations. Capt. Barnett Robinson, a member of Marine Glider Group 71, concluded in his search that the farmland would suit the Marine Corps’ needs.

The location was placed under the command of Marine Corps Base Camp Lejeune and received its first squadron, VMSB-331 from Marine Corps Air Station Cherry Point on 9 March 1943. On 1 June, VMSB-331 was divided in half to create VMSB-332. However, both squadrons were soon after relocated to Bogue Field. From mid-1943 through August 1944, Marine bombing squadrons VMB-433, VMB-443 and VMB-612 operating the land-based PBJ Mitchell bomber were stationed there. On 26 April 1944, the area of land around New River and Peterfield Point, named after the original owner of the farmland that was part of the government purchase, was commissioned Marine Corps Auxiliary Airfield Camp Lejeune. This delineated the airfield from Camp Lejeune, and marks its official birth as a separate Marine Corps installation. Over the next few years, paratrooper Marines, glider troops and air delivery personnel were trained in King Air hangar, the Stations’ first hangar, which was transported from Marine Corps Recruit Depot Parris Island, South Carolina.

As World War II came to an end, MCAAF Camp Lejeune was closed and reverted to caretaker status as an outlying airfield of MCAS Cherry Point. This did not last long, however, as in 1951 the installation was reactivated and became Marine Corps Air Facility Peterfield Point, Camp Lejeune. Only one year later the name was changed again, this time to Marine Corps Air Facility New River. July 1954 marked the arrival of the first operational Marine Aircraft Group, MAG-26, which was transferred from MCAS Cherry Point.

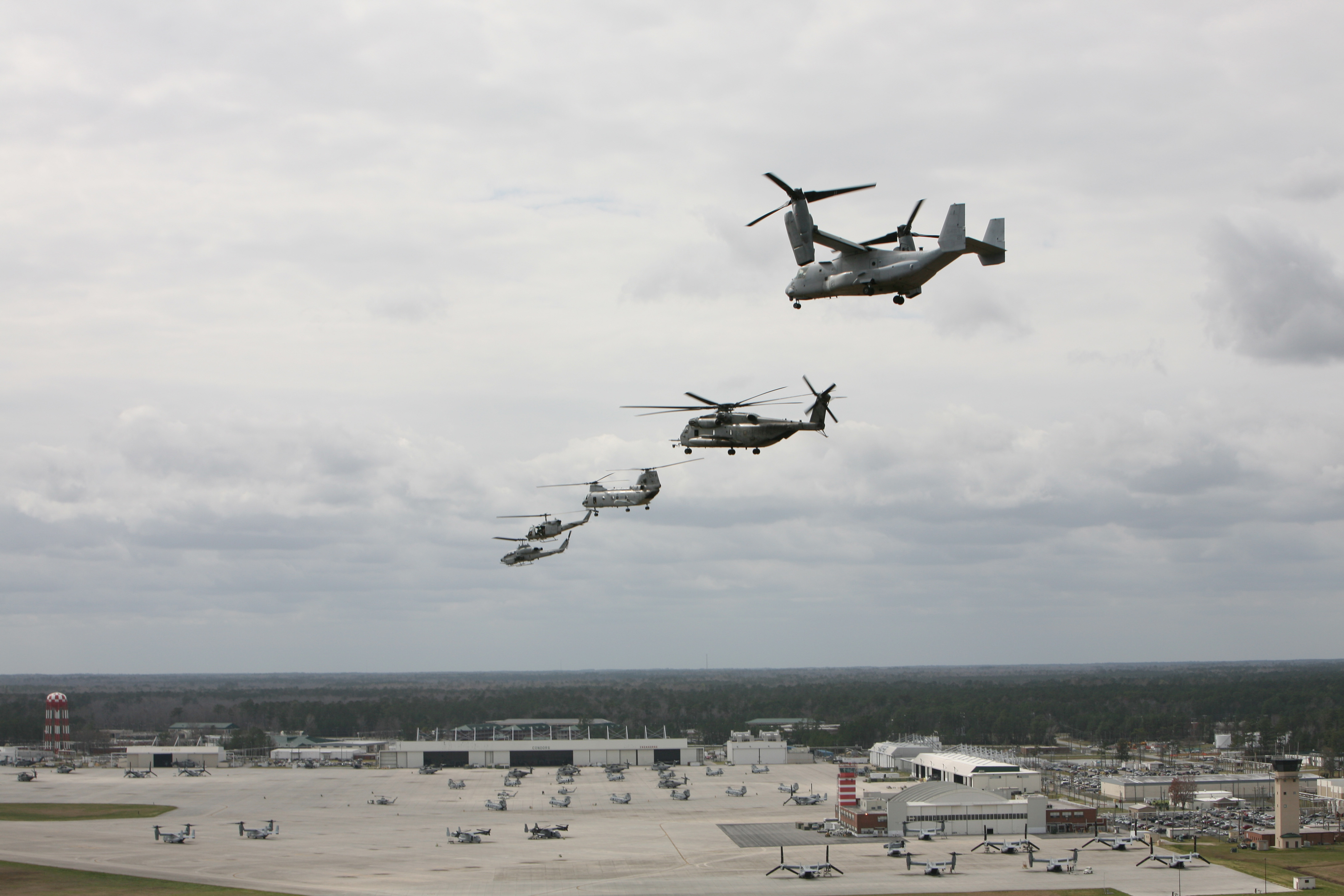
From right, a V-22 Osprey, a CH-53E Super Stallion, a CH-46 Sea Knight, a UH-1N Huey, and an AH-1 Cobra fly in formation over Marine Corps Air Station New River, North Carolina, March 18, 2008.

The area faced another major name change in 1968, where it was recommissioned as Marine Corps Air Station (Helicopter) New River, marking its growth from a small training area to a major operational airfield.

In 2015, MCAS New River hosted the Global Rallycross racing series on Independence Day weekend. The race weekend was expanded to two rounds in 2016, but did not return for the 2017 season.

In January 2022, HMH-461 became the first operational unit in the Marine Corps to replace its CH-53E Super Stallion with the upgraded CH-53K King Stallion.

== MV-22 Osprey ==
The Air Station was the first Marine Corps base with the new MV-22 Osprey. It has the ability to fly like a plane, and take off and land like a helicopter. The MV-22 has replaced all of the CH-46E Sea Knights on the east coast with the exception of HMX-1. Currently there are eight operational Osprey squadrons, VMM-261, VMM-263, VMM-162, VMM-365, VMM-266, VMM-264, VMMT-204 and VMM-774.

== Based units ==
Flying and notable non-flying units based at MCAS New River.

=== United States Marine Corps ===
Marine Corps Installations – East

- Headquarters and Headquarters Squadron – UC-12W Huron

2nd Marine Aircraft Wing

- Marine Air Control Group 28
  - Marine Air Control Squadron 2 (MACS-2) (Detachment B)
- Marine Aircraft Group 26
  - Marine Aviation Logistics Squadron 26 (MALS-26)
  - Marine Medium Tilt-Rotor Squadron 162 (VMM-162) – MV-22B Osprey
  - Marine Medium Tilt-Rotor Squadron 261 (VMM-261) – MV-22B Osprey
  - Marine Medium Tilt-Rotor Squadron 263 (VMM-263) – MV-22B Osprey
  - Marine Medium Tilt-Rotor Squadron 266 (VMM-266) – MV-22B Osprey
  - Marine Medium Tilt-Rotor Squadron 365 (VMM-365) – MV-22B Osprey
  - Marine Medium Tilt-Rotor Training Squadron 204 (VMMT-204) – MV-22B Osprey
- Marine Aircraft Group 29
  - Marine Aviation Logistics Squadron 29 (MALS-29)
  - Marine Heavy Helicopter Squadron 461 (HMH-461) – CH-53K King Stallion
  - Marine Heavy Helicopter Squadron 464 (HMH-464) – CH-53E Super Stallion
  - Marine Heavy Helicopter Training Squadron 302 (HMHT-302) – CH-53E Super Stallion
  - Marine Light Attack Helicopter Squadron 167 (HMLA-167) – AH-1Z Viper and UH-1Y Venom
- Marine Air Control Group 28
  - Marine Wing Support Squadron 272

Commander, Operational Test and Evaluation Force

- Marine Operational Test and Evaluation Squadron 1 (VMX-1)
  - Detachment – CH-53E Super Stallion and CH-53K King Stallion

=== United States Navy ===
- Center for Naval Aviation Technical Training (CNATT)

=== United States Air Force ===
Air Education and Training Command (AETC)

- Second Air Force
  - 82nd Training Wing
    - 362nd Training Squadron
      - Detachment 1, Operating Location A
- Nineteenth Air Force
  - 58th Special Operations Wing
    - 58th Operations Group
      - Detachment 1

== Education ==
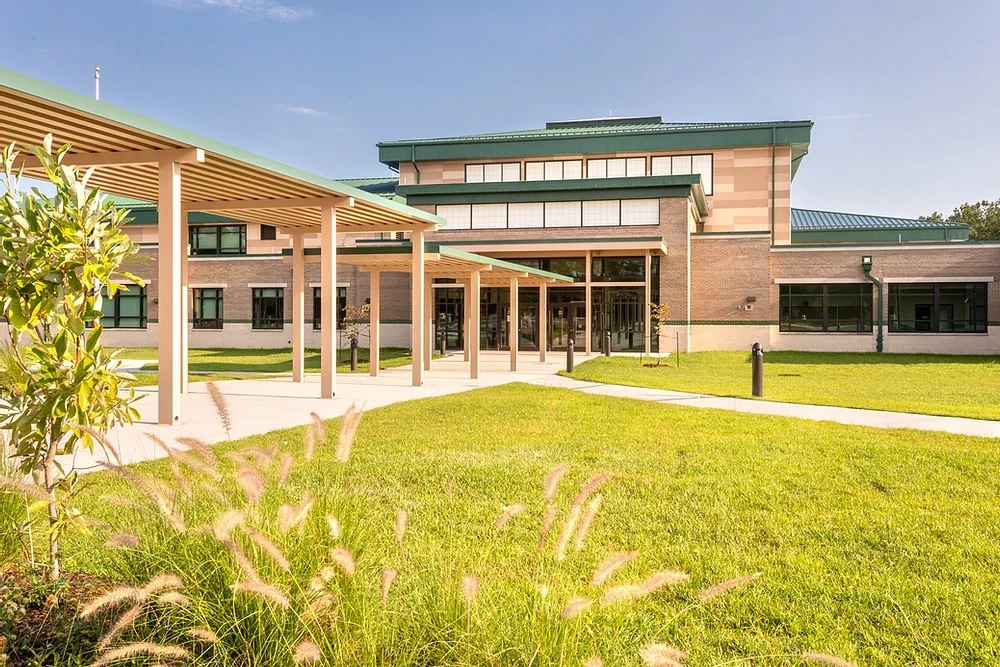
Delalio Elementary School

Residents are zoned to schools of the Department of Defense Education Activity (DoDEA). Delalio Elementary School, the sole school on the property, serves residents of the air station, while Brewster Middle School and Lejeune High School in Camp Lejeune serve the community for secondary school.

== See also ==
- List of United States Marine Corps installations
- United States Marine Corps Aviation
- List of airports in North Carolina
- Marine Corps Outlying Field Camp Davis
