= Al-Taqaddum Air Base =

Iraqi airbase

Al Taqaddum Air Base Habbaniyah Plateau
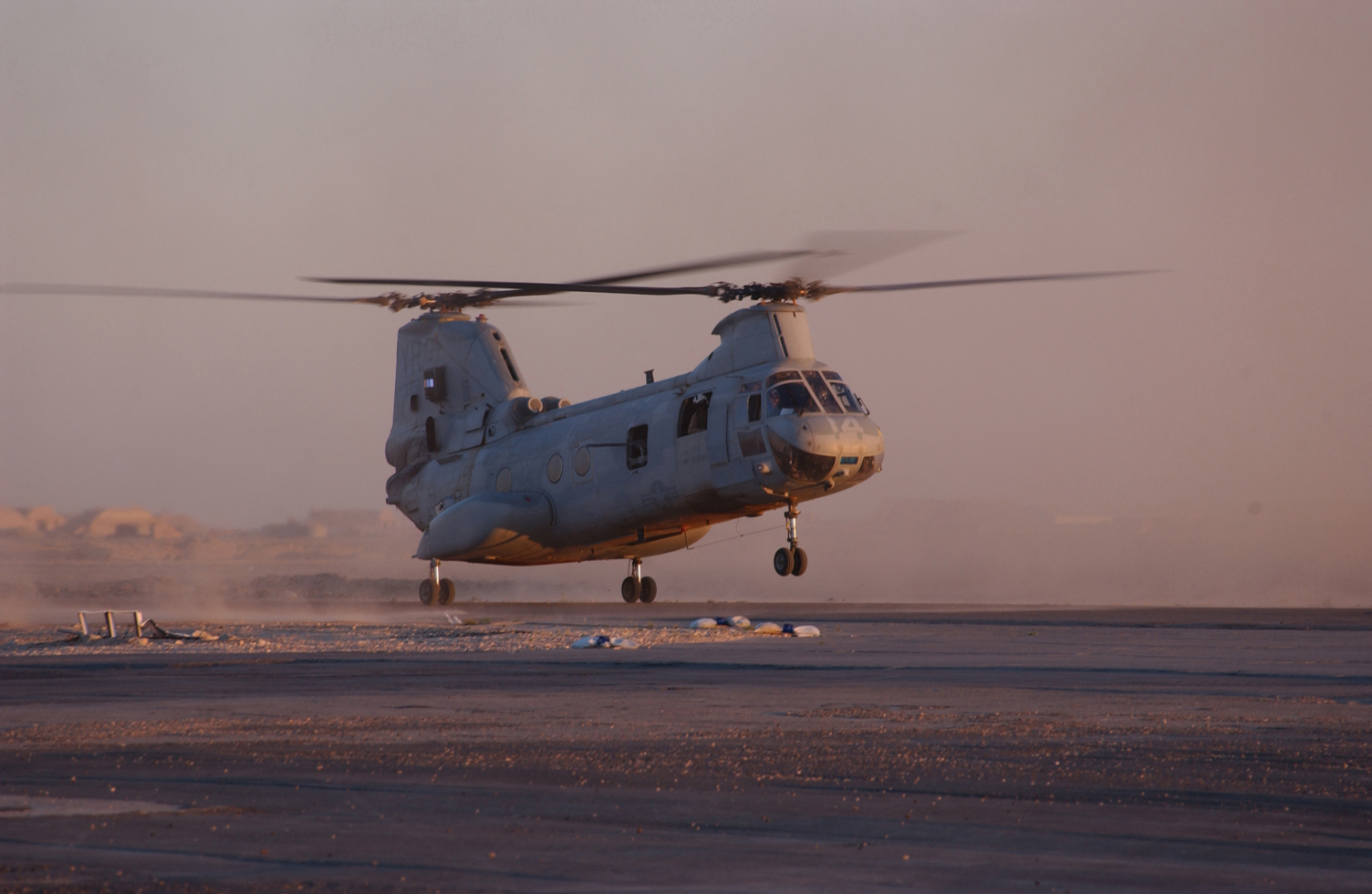
- CH-46 Sea Knight landing at Al Taqaddum Air Base in 2004
- IATA: TQD; ICAO: ORAT; LID: MAT

Summary
- Airport type: Military: Airbase
- Operator: Iraqi Armed Forces
- Serves: Al Fallujah, Iraq
- Location: Habbaniyah
- Elevation AMSL: 275 ft (84 m)
- Coordinates: 33°20′22″N 043°35′24″E

Map
- Location within Iraq

Runways
Direction	Length		Surface
Direction	ft	m	Surface
12R/30L	13,186	4,019	Concrete
12L/30R	12,087	3,684	Concrete / Asphalt
- No ILS

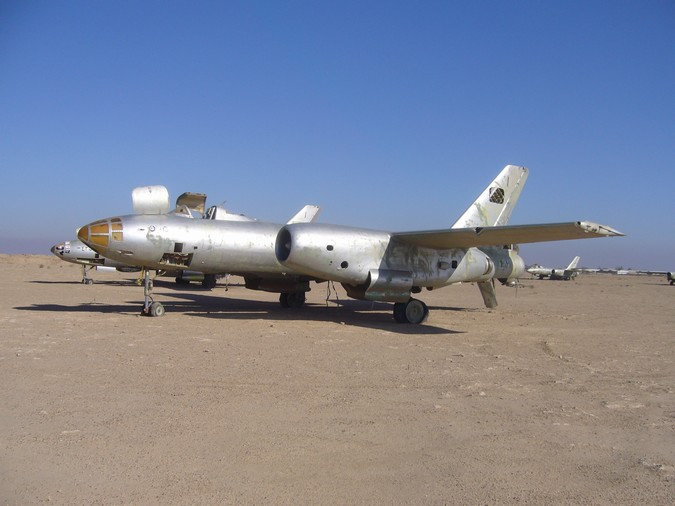
A junked Il-28 "Beagle" from Saddam Husseins' former regime at Al Taqaddum Airbase, Iraq

Al Taqaddum Airbase (Arabic: قاعدة التقدم الجوية) or Al Taqaddum AB (IATA: TQD, ICAO: ORAT), called TQ in military shorthand slang, is an air base that is located in central Iraq, approximately 74 kilometers (46 miles) west of Baghdad, at Habbaniyah. The airfield is served by two runways 13,000 and 12,000 feet (3,700 m) long. Since 2004, it has been known as Camp Taqaddum. ("Taqaddum" is an Arabic word which means "progress".) It was formerly known as Tammuz Airbase.

The airbase was originally built by the Royal Air Force (RAF) in 1952 as the subsidiary Plateau Airfield of nearby RAF Habbaniya, whose runway was inadequate for the larger long range and jet aircraft being introduced. The original RAF runway was subsequently extended by the Iraqis and a parallel runway added. Some of the RAF buildings (Nissen huts) were still standing in 2003.

== History ==
=== Iraqi Air Force use before 1991 ===
Al Taqaddum Airbase was known as "Tammuz Airbase" (Tammuz being the Assyrian month that the 14 July revolution happened in Iraq), and various Iraqi Air Force units and squadrons used it.

The airbase was bombed in Operation Kaman 99, the day after the beginning of the Iran–Iraq War.

Units and squadrons present before 2003:

- 14th Squadron Mikoyan-Gurevich MiG-21
- 73rd Squadron Mikoyan-Gurevich MiG-23
- 6th Squadron Mikoyan-Gurevich MiG-29
- 5th Squadron Sukhoi Su-22
- 105th Squadron Sukhoi Su-25s
- 109th Squadron Sukhoi Su-25s

Fifty-one different Iraqi Air Force aircraft were found hidden under camouflage nets near al-Taqaddum by the Australian Special Air Service. Although still only scant details are known about these aircraft, US and British military sources reported that these 51 aircraft included three MiG-25s (including a single MiG-25PU two-seater), a Su-25K and a Su-7U, a MiG-29, several F-7Bs and Su-22UM-3Ks, as well as one Ilushin Il-76 transport.

U.S. forces also found the hulks of five remaining Iraqi Tupolev Tu-22B "Blinder" supersonic bombers. All were still sitting in the revetments where they had been hit and destroyed by Coalition air attacks in 1991. Near them the wreckage of the Adnan-1 AEW aircraft, a third example was found, also destroyed by air attacks in 1991, as well as the wreck of the last Iraqi Tu-16 or H-6D bomber, which survived 1991, and was made operational in 2000 again: this old bomber was observed in flight – together with the sole surviving Iraqi Su-24MK – as late as February 2003, but was then obviously hit by US air strikes.

The last Iraqi Su-24MK was apparently captured intact, and there are rumours that it was meanwhile flown to the US as well. Another rarity reported to have survived the war at al-Taqaddum were several Ilyushin Il-28 "Beagle" bombers, including one Il-28U training aircraft. Supplied to the IrAF in 1960, this aircraft must have certainly seen quite some service history: they were used during the extensive campaigns against Kurdish rebels, in the 1960s, mid-1970s, and mid-1980s during the war against Iran.

=== 1991 Gulf War ===
At 12:30AM on January 17, 1991, aircraft from CVW-17 on the USS Saratoga CV-60 and CVW-3 from the USS John F. Kennedy CV-67, launched to attack Tammuz Air Base. The main strike was escorted by three EA-6B Prowlers from VQ-130, two sections of F-14A Tomcats from VF-32. Before the Navy aircraft arrived, F-117A Nighthawks attacked the Joint Integrated Operations Center & GCI Radar Facility at Tammuz Air Base.

AA-310, an A-7E Corsair II from VA-46 piloted by Jeffery Greer fired ADM-141 TALD decoys, forcing the Iraqi radars to be activated. AGM-88 HARMs from A-6E SWIPs, A-7Es and F/A-18Cs were then expended against the SAM sites near the base and West Baghdad, followed by jamming by the EA-6B Prowlers. During this phase, at 3:50AM, LCDR. Scott Speicher, who preparing to fire the first of two AGM-88 HARMs from his F/A-18C Hornet AA-403 from VFA-81, was downed by an Iraqi MiG-25PDS, with Speicher ejecting but dying shortly after.

At 4:00AM, ten A-6E TRAM Intruders from VA-35 and VA-75, attacked the hangars and MiG maintenance depot at Tammuz. Between 4:00AM and 4:03AM, VA-35's four A-6E TRAM Intruders, each carrying four Mk.84 bombs, dive bombed from 25,000 ft at the two large hangars. The MiG-29 assembly facilities were then hit by four A-6Es from VA-75 with GBU-10 Paveway II LGBs between 4:04AM and 4:07AM.

On January 24, 1991, seven Tupolev Tu-16/B-6D Badgers being configured with chemical weapons were attacked on the ground at Tammuz Air Base, with 4 being destroyed.

A MiG-25 from Tammuz also took part in the Samurra Air Battle on January 30, 1991. Another MiG-25 and it were chased back but landed safely at Tammuz.

=== 2003 U.S. invasion ===
The Iraqi airbase was long-abandoned when U.S. forces occupied it in March 2003. The U.S. Army started to refer to the base as Forward Operating Base (FOB) Ridgway. The first U.S. Battalion to occupy the base was the 142nd Corps Support Battalion. The primary mission of the 142nd was to provide logistical support to nearby non-divisional Army units. However, a consequential mission of the 800 soldier battalion was to guard the local Iraqi ammunition storage area that at one time supplied the ammunition requirements of the defunct Iraqi airbase. Aviation elements of the 3rd ACR occupied the airfield from April 2003 until replaced by 82nd Airborne Division in July 2003.

In 2004, the base name was changed to Camp Taqaddum to keep a more Iraqi face on the local military mission. "TQ" served as a major hub of men and materiel moving into Anbar province by coalition forces in Operation Iraqi Freedom.

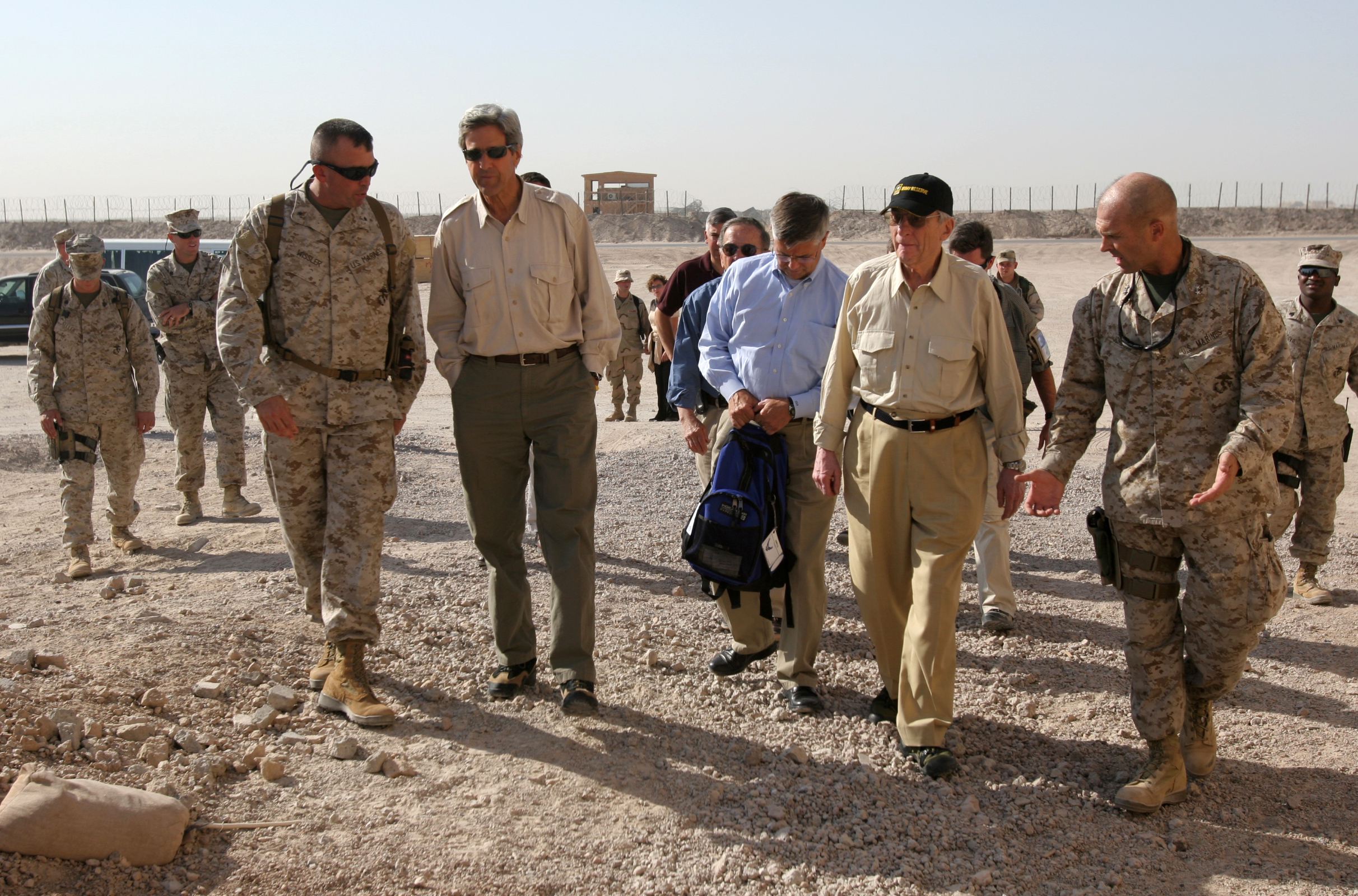
U.S. Senators John Kerry of Massachusetts, Ted Stevens of Alaska, and John Warner of Virginia in Al Taqaddum

According to the Gulf War Air Power Survey, there were 24 Hardened Aircraft Shelters at Al Taqaddum. At each end of the main runway are hardened aircraft shelters knowns as a HAS (pronounced Haas), "trapezoids" or "Yugos" which were built by Yugoslavian contractors some time prior to 1985. Various units of the U.S. Army found numerous MIG-21, MiG 25 and Su 25 Iraqi Air Force fighter jets partially buried in the area, presumably from the time of the Gulf War. By January 2004, almost all of the dozens of aircraft had been removed by the local citizens and burned, evidently, for scrap metal.

There are three "sides" to Al Taqaddum, "Lake Side", "Main Side", and "Spring Lake". These sides denote particular areas. Each area has its own chow hall and phone center. The PX and main military support services are located on "Main Side". "Lake Side" hosts the air terminal and the primary supply depot. "Spring Lake" hosts other logistics units.

TQ is adjacent to Lake Habbaniyah. This lake varies in colors, blue some days, to a greenish tint on others. The base is built on a desolate plateau overlooking the Euphrates River to the north and Lake Habbaniyah to the south. A drainage canal from Lake Habbaniyah flows between it and the base at Habbaniyah.

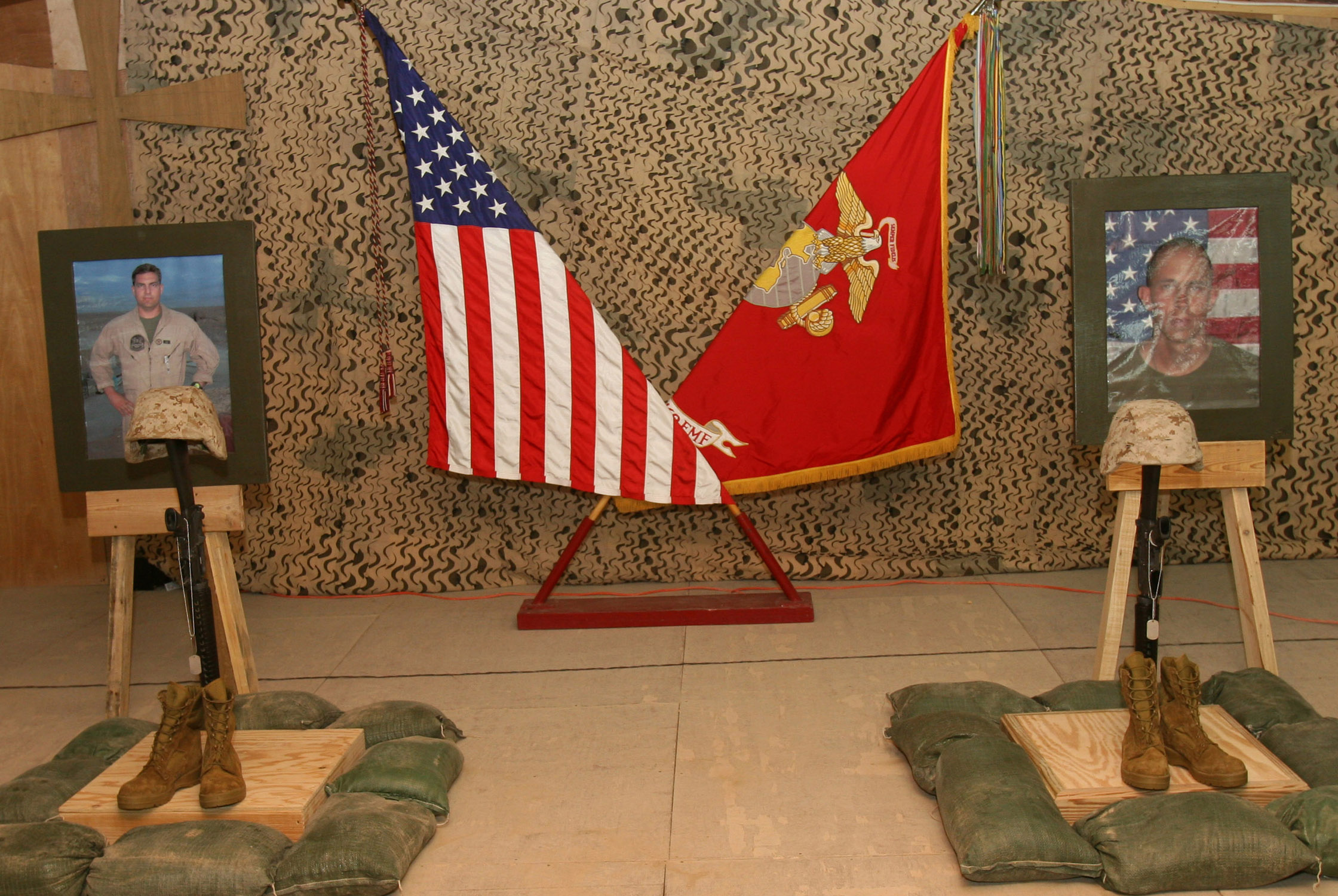
United States Marines gather to honor the lives of fallen Marines during their memorial service held at Al-Taqaddum Air Base

In late 2009 Al Taqaddum was turned back over to the Iraqi Military.

==== Greene Field ====
On August 22, 2004, a group of Marines dedicated the airfield at Al Taqaddum to Lt. Col. David S. Greene, a reserve Marine AH-1W Super Cobra pilot with Marine Light Attack Helicopter Squadron 775, Marine Aircraft Group 16, 3rd Marine Aircraft Wing, who was killed in action July 28, 2004. Greene was flying a mission in support of I Marine Expeditionary Force when he was killed by small arms fire.

==== List of Marine Corps units since 2004 ====
- Marine Corps Systems Command (MCSC) Special Unit - (To install Armor on all HMMWV (Humvee))

2004-2006 2nd TSB transportation support battalion (known now as 2nd MSG Marine logistics Group)

- 1st Force Service Support Group 2004-2005
- 8th Communications Battalion (February 2005 to February 2006, USMC- Camp Lejeune, NC) https://www.iimef.marines.mil/Units/8th-Communication-Battalion/
- 8th Engineer Support Battalion between 2005 and 2006 (USMC - Camp Lejeune)
- Marine Medium Helicopter Squadron (HMM-263) July 2004 - Feb 2005
- Marine Medium Helicopter Squadron (HMM-364) Feb 2005 - Sept 2005
- HMM-268 during 2006.
- HMM-161 from February to September 2007.
- HMM-161 from September 2008 to April 2009.
- HMM-262 (RYF) from February 2007 to October 2007
- Marine Light Attack Helicopter Squadron 775 (HMLA-775) April to October 2004 and April to October 2005
- HMLA-369 from 2005 until April 2006.
- HMLA-169 from March 2006 until October 2006.
- HMLA-367 from October 2006 to May 2007
- HMLA-369 from April 2007 to November 2007
- HMLA-169 from November 2007 to October 2008.
- HMLA-369 from October 2008 to May 2009
- Marine Unmanned Aerial Vehicle Squadron 2 (VMU-2) during 2007.
- Marine Wing Support Squadron 372 (MWSS 372) November 2005.
- Marine Wing Support Squadron 373 (MWSS 373) August 2004, September 2006 to March 2007 and September 2008 to April 2009.
- MWSS 374 2004, March 2006 and 2008.
- MWSS 371 between February 2005 and September 2005.
- MWSS-274 between 2007 and 2008.
- MWSS-272 between 2007 and 2008.
- VMU-1 between 2005 and 2009.
- Marine Aviation Logistics Squadron 16 (MALS-16), Detachment A from March 2006.
- MALS-29, Detachment A during 2007.
- Marine Air Control Squadron 2 (MACS-2), Detachment A from July 2006 until August 2007.

== Current use ==
The base is home to the 10th Division, Iraqi Army, and the Anbar Operations Command Center. Since 2015 part of the base was called Camp Manion which is home to Task Force Spartan which consists of I Marine Expeditionary Force and augments from Special Purpose Marine Air-Ground Task Force – Crisis Response – Central Command, as well as U.S. Soldiers with 1st Infantry Division, Airmen with 82nd Expeditionary Air Support Operations Squadron and 442nd Air Expeditionary Squadron United States Air Forces Central Command, and components of the Australian and Italian armed forces, with medical support from 772nd Forward Surgical Team, the 115th Combat Support Hospital and U.S. Navy Corpsmen with II MEF and SPMAGTF-CR-CC.

On April 5, 2020, the US-led CJTF–OIR handed over the base to Iraqi security forces by the last Commander of Task Force Spartan, Col Scott Mayfield.

== See also ==
- Al Asad Airbase
- Camp Speicher
- RAF Habbaniya
- Smoke the Donkey
- List of United States Military installations in Iraq
- United States Forces – Iraq
