= Special Purpose Marine Air-Ground Task Force – Crisis Response – Central Command =

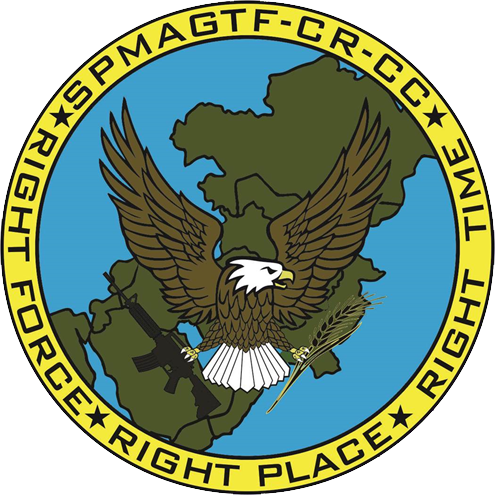
- The SPMAGTF-CR-CC official seal
- Active: 2013–October 2021
- Country: United States
- Branch: United States Marine Corps (USMC)
- Type: Marine Air-Ground Task Force
- Role: Forward-deployed, rapid-response force
- Part of: 15th Marine Expeditionary Unit; Marine Forces Central Command
- Garrison/HQ: Undisclosed location, Kuwait
- Mottos: Right Force, Right Place, Right Time

Special Purpose Marine Air-Ground Task Force – Crisis Response – Central Command (SP-MAGTF-CR-CC) was a Marine Air-Ground Task Force that was based at an undisclosed location in Southwest Asia.

It was a self-mobile, self-sustaining force of Marines and sailors, capable of responding to a range of crises. The unit was specifically trained to support U.S. and partner interests throughout the United States Central Command area of responsibility, to include embassy reinforcement, support to noncombatant evacuation operations, tactical recovery of aircraft and personnel, humanitarian assistance, and disaster relief. The unit also took part in bilateral and multilateral training exercises with regional partners. It was commanded by a U.S. Marine colonel (O-6).

== Assets ==
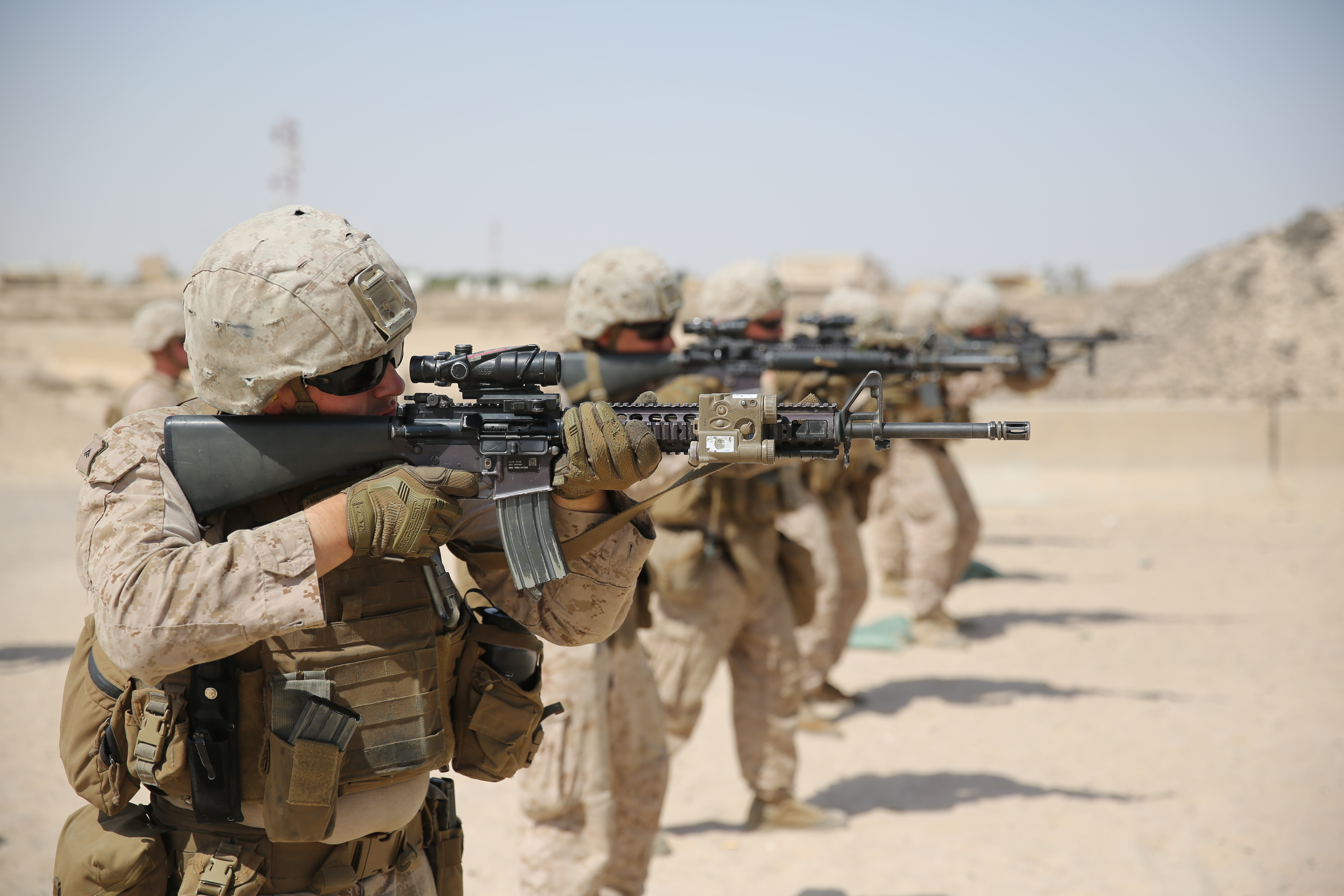
Marines from the 3rd Battalion, 7th Marines during a training exercise undertaken while assigned to the Special Purpose Marine Air-Ground Task Force – Crisis Response – Central Command in March 2015

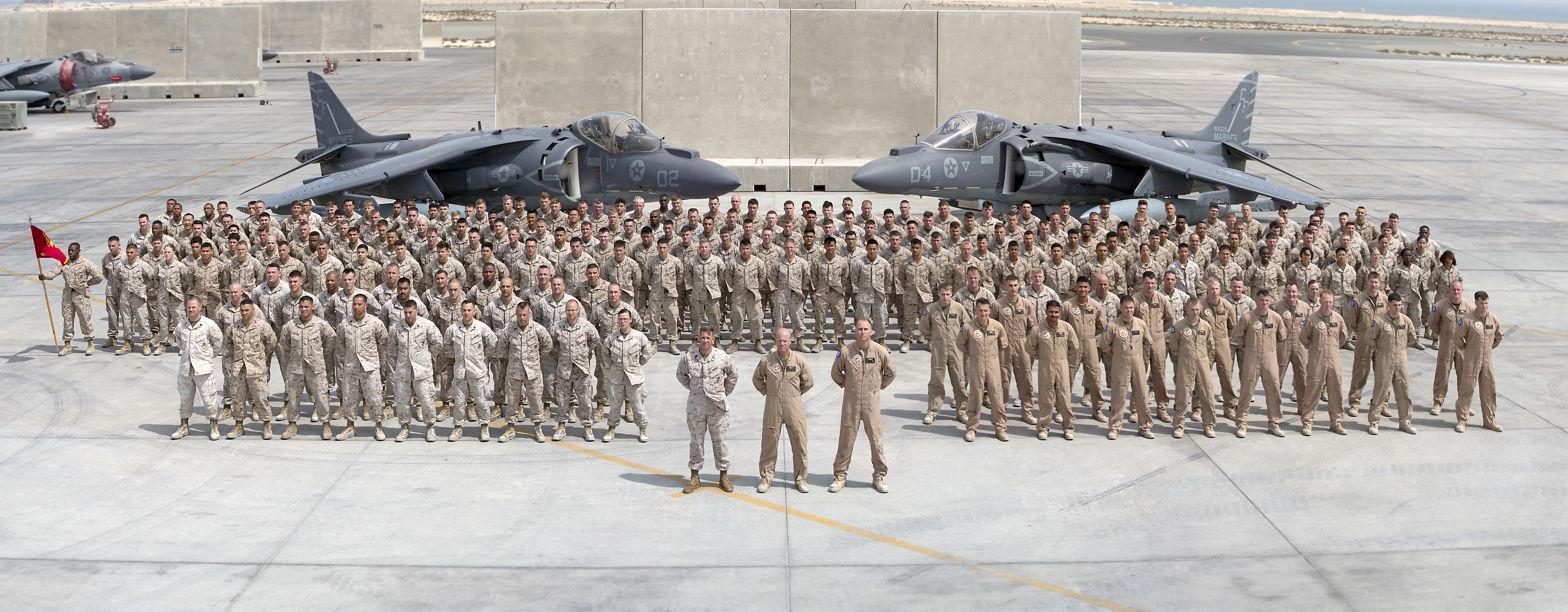
Group photo of personnel from Marine Attack Squadron 211 while deployed in support of the Special Purpose Marine Air-Ground Task Force – Crisis Response – Central Command in April 2015

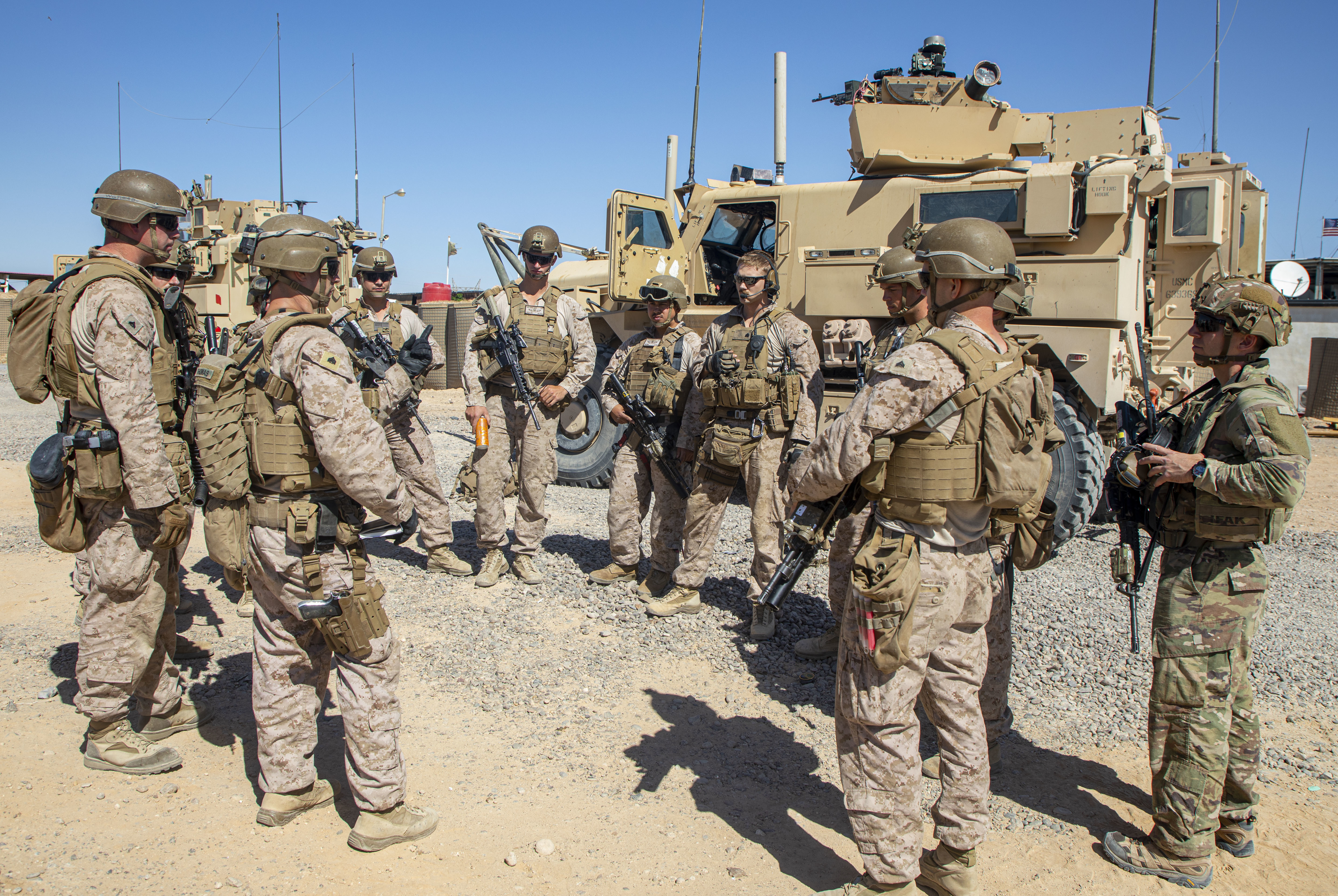
Marines from 2nd Battalion, 5th Marines assigned to the Special Purpose Marine Air-Ground Task Force – Crisis Response – Central Command and Army soldiers with 2nd Brigade Combat Team, 82nd Airborne Division discuss plans prior to a joint patrol in Syria in August 2020

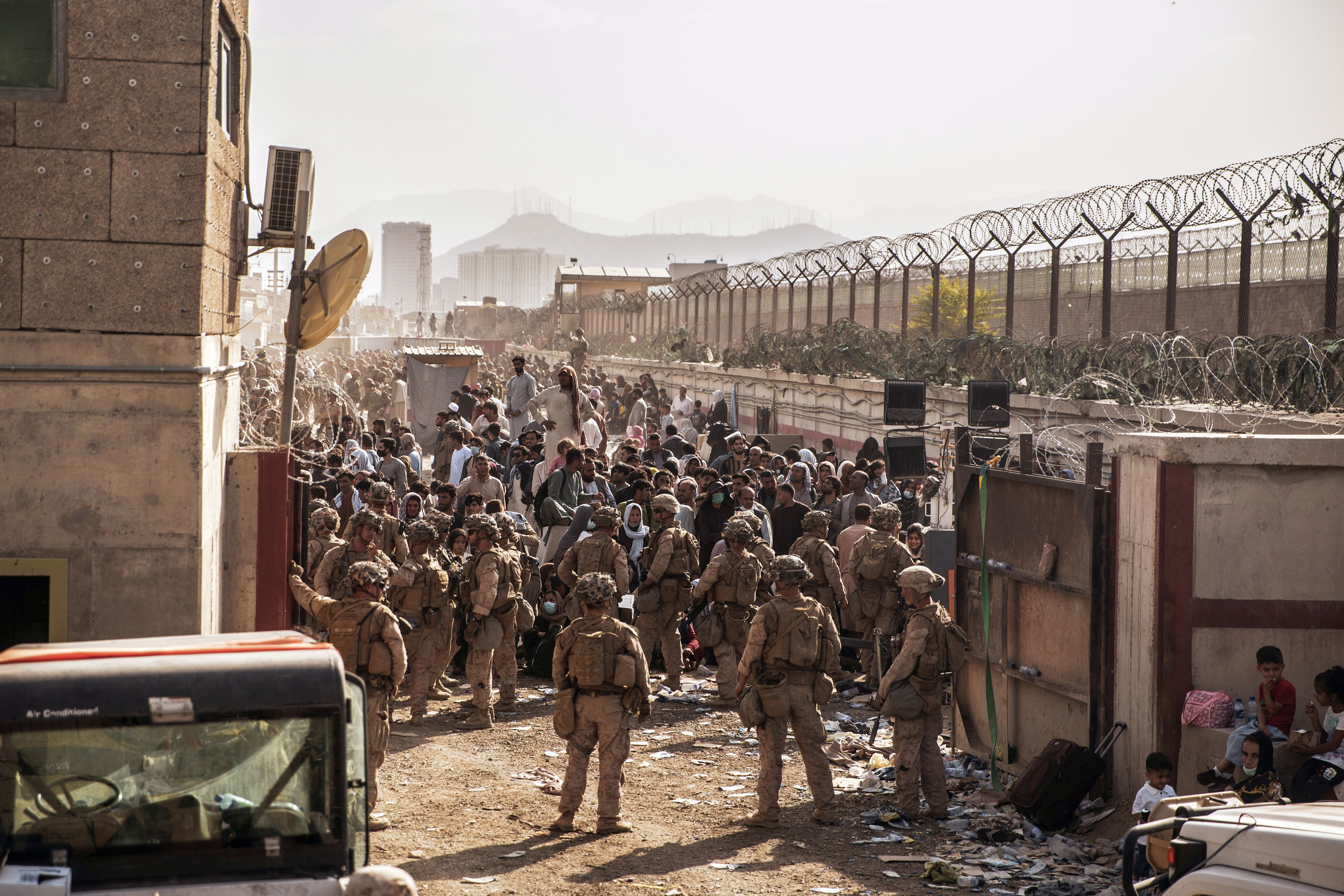
SP-MAGTF-CR-CC personnel at Hamid Karzai International Airport during the 2021 Kabul airlift

The rotations were made up of four elements, Command Element (CE), Ground Combat Element (GCE), Logistics Combat Element (LCE) and the Aviation Combat Element (ACE)

=== 2013–2018 ===
- October 2013 – April 2014 (14.1)
  - VMFA(AW)-225 "CE" – F/A-18D between October 2013 and April 2014.
- April 2014 – October 2014 (14.2)
  - VMM-363 "YZ" – MV-22B Osprey
  - VMAQ-4 "RM" – EA-6B Prowler
  - VMA-211 "CF" – AV-8B Harrier
  - Unknown unit – KC-130J Hercules
  - Unknown unit – RQ-7 Shadow
- September 2014 – April 2015 (15.1)
  - GCE – 2nd Battalion, 7th Marines
- April 2015 – October 2015 (15.2)
  - GCE – 3rd Battalion, 7th Marines
  - ACE
    - VMM-165 "YW" – MV-22B Osprey
- October 2015 – April 2016. (16.1)
  - GCE – 1st Battalion, 7th Marines
  - LCE – Combat Logistics Battalion 1 (CLB-1)
  - ACE
    - VMM-268 "YQ" – MV-22B Osprey
    - Detachment from Marine Aerial Refueler Transport Squadron 352
- April 2016 – October 2016 (16.2)
  - CE – Headquarters Company, 5th Marine Regiment
  - GCE – 2nd Battalion 7th Marines (2/7)
  - LCE – Combat Logistics Battalion 5 (CLB-5)
  - ACE
    - VMFA(AW)-533 "ED" – F/A-18D from April 2016.
    - VMM-363 "YZ" – MV-22B
    - Marine Wing Support Squadron 373 (MWSS-373) during July 2016.
    - Detachment from Marine Air Control Group 28 (MACG-28)
    - Marine Aviation Logistics Squadron 16 (MALS-16)
    - Detachment Alpha from Marine Aerial Refueler Transport Squadron 352 (VMGR-352) – KC-130J
- October 2016 – April 2017 (17.1)
  - CE – Headquarters Company, 5th Marine Regiment
  - GCE – 3rd Battalion 7th Marines
  - LCE
  - ACE – VMM-165
- April 2017 – October 2017 (17.2)
  - CE
  - GCE – 1st Battalion, 7th Marines
  - LCE
  - ACE
    - VMA-231 – AV-8B
    - VMM-364 – MV-22B
    - Detachment from VMGR-352 – KC-130J
    - Marine Wing Support Squadron 372 (MWSS-372)
- October 2017 – April 2018 (18.1)
  - CE
  - GCE – 2nd Battalion, 7th Marines
  - LCE – Combat Logistics Detachment 5
  - ACE
    - VMM-363 – MV-22B
    - Marine Wing Support Squadron 373 (MWSS-373)
- April 2018 – October 2018 (18.2)
  - CE
  - GCE – 3rd Battalion, 7th Marines
  - LCE – Combat Logistics Detachment 37
  - ACE
    - VMM-164 "YT" – MV-22B
    - Marine Wing Support Squadron 371 (MWSS-371)
- October 2018 – April 2019 (19.1)
  - CE
  - GCE – 3rd Battalion, 4th Marines
  - LCE – Combat Logistics Detachment 34
  - ACE - Marine Wing Support Squadron 372 (EFR TrapLordz)
    - VMM-165 "EM" – MV-22B
    - Detachment from VMGR-352 – KC-130J

=== 2019–2021 ===
- April 2019 – October 2019 (19.2)
  - CE
  - GCE – 1st Battalion, 7th Marines
  - LCE – Combat Logistics Detachment 17
  - ACE
    - VMM-261 "EM" – MV-22B
    - VMA-311 "WL" – AV-8
    - MWSD-473
- October 2019 – April 2020 (20.1)
  - CE
  - GCE – 2nd Battalion, 7th Marines
  - LCE – Combat Logistics Detachment 27
  - ACE
    - VMM-364 "PF" – MV-22B
    - Marine Wing Support Detachment 373
- April 2020 – October 2020 (20.2)
  - CE - 13th Marine Expeditionary Unit
  - GCE – 2nd Battalion, 5th Marines
  - LCE
  - ACE
    - VMGR-252 (Det) "QB" - KC-130J
    - VMM-263 (MV-22)
    - MWSS-274
    - MCAS-2
    - MALS-26
- October 2020 – April 2021 (21.1)
  - CE - 13th Marine Expeditionary Unit
  - GCE – 3rd Battalion, 1st Marines
  - LCE
  - ACE
- April 2021 – October 2021 (21.2)
  - CE
  - GCE – 2nd Battalion, 1st Marines
  - LCE - Combat Logistics Battalion 21 (CLB 21)
  - ACE
    - MWSS-373
    - VMGR-352
    - VMGR-234
    - VMM-364

== See also ==
- Special Purpose Marine Air-Ground Task Force – Crisis Response – Africa
- Marine Air-Ground Task Force
- List of Marine Expeditionary Units
- Organization of the United States Marine Corps
- Immediate Response Force
