= Marine Wing Communications Squadron 38 =

United States military unit

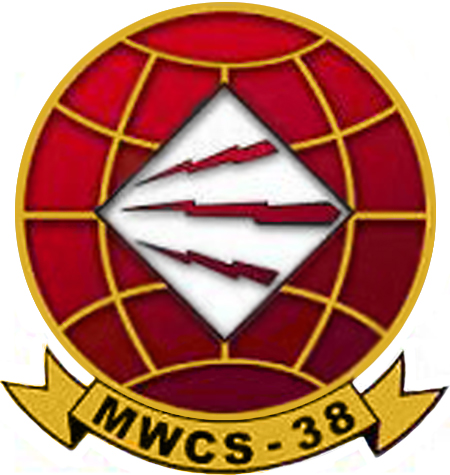
- Marine Wing Communications Squadron 38 insignia
- Country: United States of America
- Branch: United States Marine Corps
- Type: Aviation Command & Control
- Role: Communications
- Part of: Marine Air Control Group 38; 3rd Marine Aircraft Wing
- Garrison/HQ: Marine Corps Air Station Miramar
- Nickname: Red Lightning
- Mottos: "BOOM, RED LIGHTNING!"
- Anniversaries: 1 September 1967

Commanders
- Current commander: LtCol Brian Kerg

Marine Wing Communications Squadron 38 (MWCS-38) is a United States Marine Corps communications squadron. The squadron provides expeditionary communications for the aviation combat element of the I Marine Expeditionary Force. They are based at Marine Corps Air Station Miramar, California, and fall under the command of Marine Air Control Group 38 and the 3rd Marine Aircraft Wing.

- Official Website

== Mission ==
On order, MWCS-38 provides expeditionary communications for the Aviation Combat Element (ACE) of a Marine Air Ground Task Force (MAGTF) in order to enable the Marine Air Command and Control System (MACCS) of the ACE.

== History ==
Marine Wing Communications Squadron 38 was commissioned on 1 September 1967 and assigned to Marine Wing Headquarters Group 3, 3D Marine Aircraft Wing. On 1 July 1971, the squadron was re-designated as Marine Wing Communications Squadron 38 and assigned to Marine Air Control Group 38, 3D Marine Aircraft Wing.

For most of the mid-1970s and the 1980s, the squadron's deployment schedule centered on Exercise Palm Tree and Gallant Knight/Gallant Eagle, and Weapons and Tactics Instructor Courses. On 29 April 1987, the Squadron reorganized into a headquarters element and two communications detachments, Detachment A and Detachment B. This reorganization enabled the squadron to provide communications support for the ACE and two Marine Air Ground Task Forces (MAGTF) deployed simultaneously. In the late 1980s, Display Determination, Kernel Blitz, Freedom Banner, RIMPAC, Combined Arms Exercise (CAX), and Roving Sands were added to the exercise schedule.

In August 1990, the Squadron Command Element and Detachment A deployed to Southwest Asia in support of MAG-70 for Operation Desert Shield. Over the next four months, this initial echelon grew when augmented by an MWCS-18 Detachment from Hawaii and Detachment B, MWCS-28 from New River, North Carolina, while Marine aviation forces grew to almost two wings. At the peak of Operation Desert Storm, MWCS-38 supported four fully functional Marine Air Bases, a Tactical Air Command Center (TACC), a Tactical Air Operations Center (TAOC), an Early Warning Control (EWC) center, an Aviation Logistics Ship, two Forward Arming and Refueling Points (FARP), and two relay sites.

In December 1992, MWCS-38 was once again called upon to provide expeditionary communications support during a crisis, this time for Operation Restore Hope in Somalia. MWCS-38 deployed two operational detachments in support of designated Marine Aviation Combat Element (ACE) in a historic humanitarian relief effort.

In March 2003, MWCS-38 deployed to Southwest Asia once again, this time in support of Operation Iraqi Freedom. For the next five years, a continuous detachment (+) sized communications squadron element supported the ACE and combat operations in Iraq.

In 2004, MWCS-38 Alpha platoon became the first unit in the Marine Corps to operate and deploy the AN/GRC-239 (TSSR), helping to bring about a new wave of SHF communications to "fill a void in communication conductivity that does not allow for secure fiber optic/telephone cable placement in a non-secure/compatible terrain", under the guidance of a USAF detachment.

In July 2008, MWCS-38 deployed its last detachment-sized element to Southwest Asia in support of Operation Iraqi Freedom. This deployment saw the deactivation of the last Unit Level Circuit Switch (ULCS), a tactical telephone switch, in the Iraqi theater of operations, completing the cutover of all telephone services to commercial lines.

In February 2009, MWCS-38 relinquished communications control to 9th Communication Battalion aboard Al Asad Airbase, Iraq, as the 3D Marine Aircraft Wing's footprint in Iraq was significantly reduced.

In March 2010, MWCS-38 once again deployed a detachment-sized unit to Southwest Asia, this time to Afghanistan, in support of Operation Enduring Freedom. For over two years, MWCS-38 supported combat operations and made significant accomplishments such as the installation of the communications architecture for a new flight line at Camp Leatherneck, as well as the commercialization of Kandahar Airfield. Detachment A returned from Afghanistan in August 2012 as the last MWCS-38 presence.

In October 2011, MWCS-38 began supporting the Aviation Combat Element (ACE) of the 15th Marine Expeditionary Unit (MEU), beginning with Operation Iron Fist. MWCS-38 has continued supporting the 11th, 13th, and 15th Marine Expeditionary Units from 2011 – present.

In March 2013, MWCS-38 supported MAG-50 with detachment (-) sized deployments to the Kingdom of Bahrain. MWCS-38 is now in continuous support of Special Purpose Marine Air Ground Task Force-Crisis Response-Central Command (SPMAGTF-CR-CC) with detachment (-) sized deployments to the Kingdom of Bahrain and Kuwait, and continues to prepare for future contingencies through participation in training exercises back home.

MWCS-38 is now in continuous support of Special Purpose Marine Air Ground Task Force-Crisis Response-Central Command (SPMAGTF-CR-CC) with detachment (-) sized deployments to the Kingdom of Bahrain and Kuwait, and continues to prepare for future contingencies through participation in training exercises back home.

== Command lineage ==
Time Active	Unit Engagement
August 1990 - March 1991	Participated in Operations DESERT SHIELD and Desert Storm, Southwest Asia.
December 1992 - March 1993	Elements participated in Operation Restore Hope, Somalia.
June 1996 - October 1996	Elements participated in Support of Operation Joint Endeavor, Bosnia.
September 2001 - October 2003	Participated in support of Operation Iraqi Freedom, Iraq.
January 2003	Deployed to Kuwait in support of Operation Enduring Freedom.
March 2003 - January 2009	Participated in support of Operation Iraqi Freedom, Iraq.
January 2005	Elements participated in Operation Unified Assistance, Indonesia.
2003 - 2011	Elements participated in Operation Iraqi Freedom, Iraq.
2010 - 2015	Elements participated in Operation Enduring Freedom, Afghanistan.

== See also ==
- United States Marine Corps Aviation
- Organization of the United States Marine Corps
- List of United States Marine Corps aviation support units
