= 3rd Low Altitude Air Defense Battalion =

3d Low Altitude Air Defense Battalion
- 3d LAAD Bn Unit Insignia
- Active: 8 March 1982 - present
- Country: United States of America
- Branch: United States Marine Corps
- Role: Air Defense
- Part of: Marine Air Control Group 38; 3rd Marine Aircraft Wing
- Garrison/HQ: Marine Corps Base Camp Pendleton
- Nickname: 3d LAAD Bn
- Motto: "Feel the Sting"
- Engagements: Operation Desert Storm; Operation Iraqi Freedom * 2003 invasion of Iraq; Operation Enduring Freedom

Commanders
- Current commander: LtCol Marco Arriaga

The 3d Low Altitude Air Defense Battalion (3d LAAD Bn) is a ground based air defense unit of the United States Marine Corps currently responsible for providing short range air defense. The battalion falls under the command of Marine Air Control Group 38 (MACG-38) and the 3rd Marine Aircraft Wing (3rd MAW) and is currently based at Marine Corps Base Camp Pendleton, California.

== Mission ==
Provide close-in, low altitude, surface-to-air weapons fires and when task organized, provide command and control and forces for ground security in defense of the Marine Air-Ground Task Force (MAGTF) Commander's designated vital areas.

== History ==
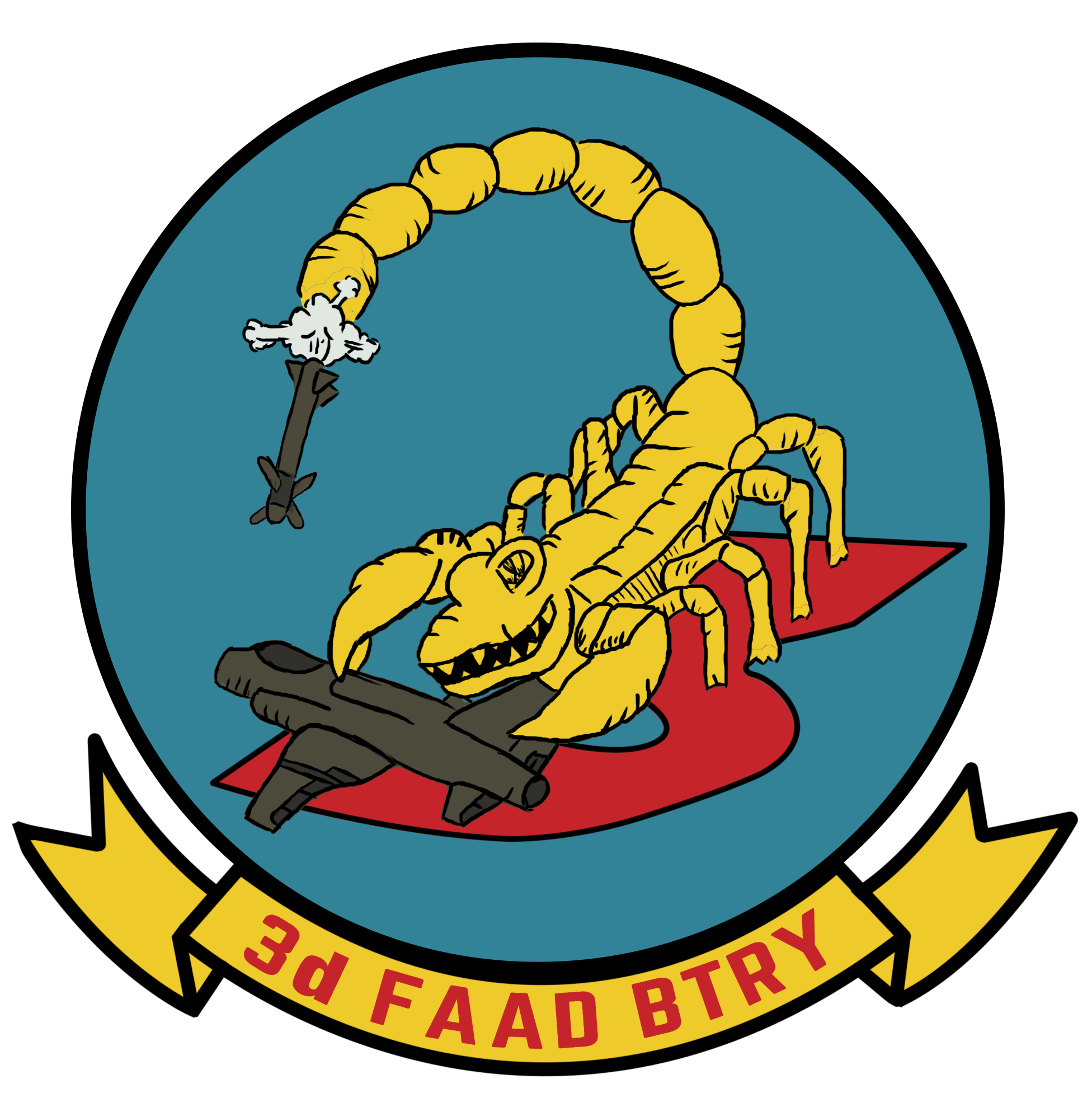
3rd FAAD Battery insignia.

3rd Forward Area Air Defense (FAAD) Battery (−) was commissioned as an independent command within Marine Air Control Group 38 on 8 March 1982 following 3rd FAAD Platoon's detachment from Marine Air Support Squadron 3 the previous day. Major Jeffrey Johnson commanded 3rd FAAD Battery under MASS-3, MACG-38, 3rd MAW, initially in 1982 at its inception. Later, under Maj Ralph F. Marchewka's command, 3rd FAAD Btry (-) started with 78 Marines and an H&S Platoon. It grew to five firing platoons before 3d Low Altitude Air Defense Battalion was activated under LtCol Robert. C. Dodt Jr. on 22 January 1987.

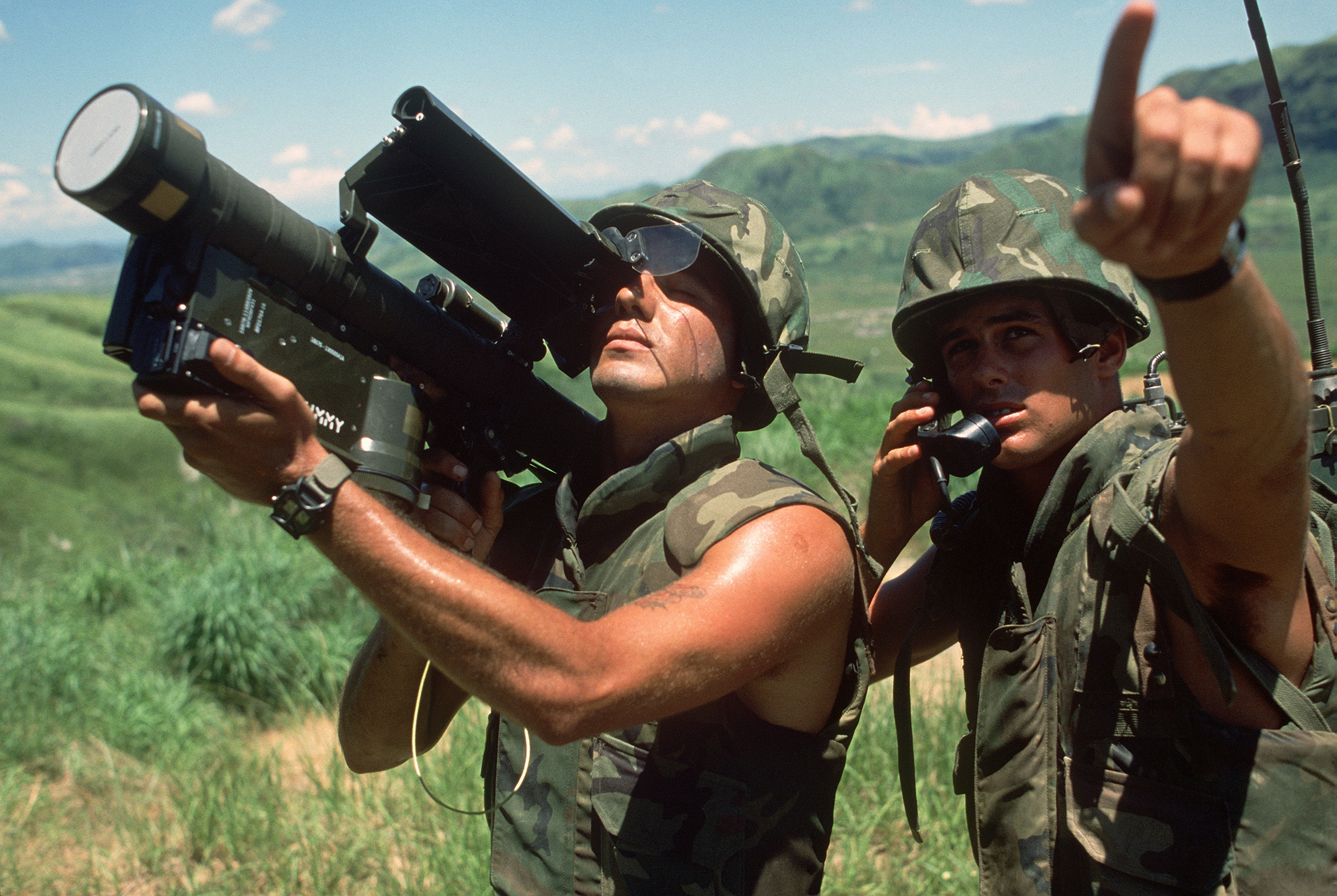
A US Marine with a field radio relays the direction of approaching aircraft to the operator of an FIM-92 Stinger missile launcher during an exercise in 1984.

From 1986 to August 1990, the battalion supported several Weapons Tactics and Instructor (WTI) flight phases at Marine Corps Air Station Yuma, Arizona, Combined Armed Exercises at the Marine Corps Air Ground Combat Center Twentynine Palms, CA, and Exercise Red Flag at Nellis Air Force Base, Nevada. During this time, the battalion also supported the 11th, 13th, and 15th Marine Expeditionary Units (MEUs) with a single LAAD section. The battalion continues to support these exercises and MEU deployments to this day.

3d LAAD Battalion experienced its first real-world test when a detachment deployed aboard the USS Okinawa (LPH-3) on 8 October 1987 as part of Contingency Marine Air Ground Task Force (CMAGTF) 1-88. In response to Iranian aggression during the Tanker Wars, Marines from B Battery provided critical air defense from Iranian aircraft and guaranteed the safety of countless merchant vessels transiting between the Straits of Hormuz and Kuwait.

With Iraq's invasion of Kuwait on 2 August 1990, the battalion was tasked to support Operation Desert Shield. On 14 August 1990, advance elements of the battalion arrived with a contingent from the 7th Marine Regiment. The remainder of the battalion, augmented by a battery from 4th LAAD Battalion, reached the Saudi Arabia between 17-20 August as part of the 5th Marine Expeditionary Brigade. At the time of embarkation, only 45 Stinger teams and necessary support personnel were authorized to deploy. Once ashore, A Battery (−) defended the vital assets of Jubayl Airport, Jubayl Port Complex, King Abdul Aziz Naval Base, and Shiek Isa Airfield, Bahrain while B Battery (-) was in direct support of 7th Marine Regiment. On 29 June 1991, the unit returned to MCB Camp Pendleton after successfully accomplishing its assigned mission.

During the 1990s, LAAD Battalions began acquiring several new weapon systems to augment dismounted Marines carrying the Stinger missile on their shoulders. 3d LAAD Bn fielded the Light Armored Vehicle-Air Defense Variant (LAV-AD) and the AN/TWQ-1 Avenger Weapons System taking into consideration concept of employment, personnel requirements, training, logistic support, and facilities requirements.

The acquisition of the LAV-AD was not without opposition. Major General Lynch, Commanding General, Marine Corps Combat Development Command, opposed the acquisition due to other Marine Corps needs and the low priority of the LAV-AD. Brigadier General West, a Marine Corps congressional liaison, favored the acquisition based on strong congressional interest and the Marine Corps' "Hill reputation" of buying only that for which it requests funding. Ultimately, the decision was made to purchase the LAV-AD due to table of organization structure availability, the current threat to the MAGTF, and the probable loss of the Marine Corps' HAWK Battalions.

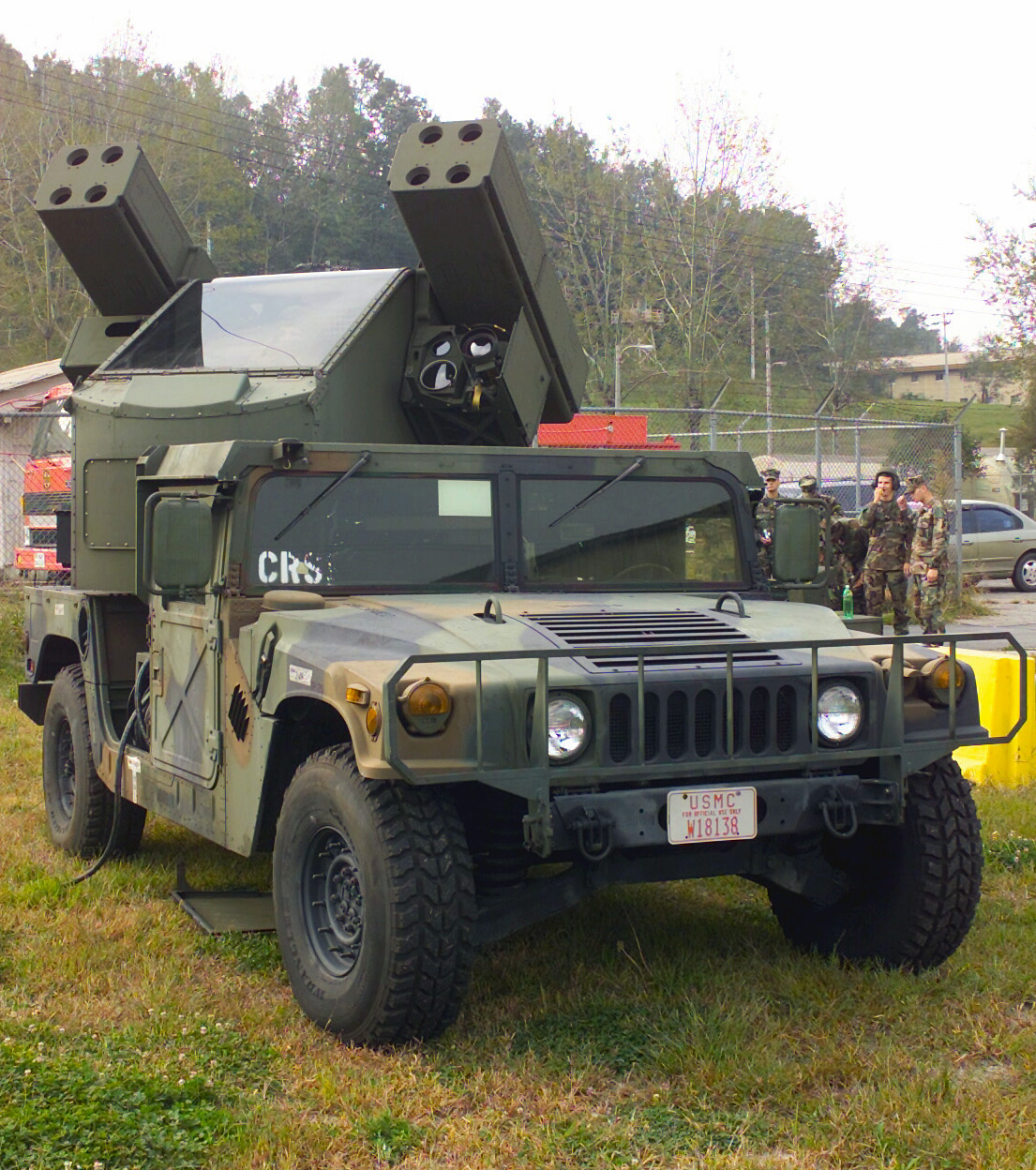
A Marine Corps AN/TWQ-1 Avenger, Pedestal Mounted Stinger Missile System mounted on a Humvee.

The Avenger Weapon System was introduced to the battalion in January 1995. The Avenger provided Marine Corps air defenders with new capabilities in a lightweight, day/night, limited adverse weather fire unit for countering the threat of low altitude, high-speed fixed-wing or rotary wing aircraft. The firing unit incorporated two Standard Vehicle-Mounted Launcher (SVML) missile pods, a .50 caliber machine gun, Forward Looking Infrared (FLIR), Laser Range Finder (LRF), and IFF capability. The fully rotating, gyro-stabilized turret was mounted on the M1097 heavy High-Mobility Multipurpose Wheeled Vehicle (HMMWV). The fire unit could engage a target with missiles or the machine gun either with a gunner in the turret or from a remote location using the Remote Control Unit (RCU). On-board communication equipment provided for VHF radio and intercom operations.

In 2005, I MEF designated 3d LAAD Bn as the Fleet Sponsor for the Complementary Low Altitude Weapon System (CLAWS). Designated members of the battalion participated in operational training with the CLAWS employing it in support of WTI 1-06. After WTI, CLAWS traveled to White Sands, New Mexico to conduct a live-fire exercise. The CLAWS team fired eight Advanced Medium Range Air-to-Air Missiles (AMRAAMs) and successfully engaged seven targets. The CLAWS team continued preparation for the fielding of the system during 2006. On 3 May 2006, Marine Corps Systems Command elected to discontinue the program on the basis of insufficient funding and lack of necessity.

=== Pre-9/11 Operations ===
Throughout the 1990s, LAAD Marines remained ready for any situation through constant training. 3d LAAD Bn consistently supported WTI Courses, Combined Arms Exercises (CAX), Red Flag Exercises, and numerous other air defense exercises throughout the continental United States.

In September 1994, A Battery conducted anti-narcotic operations in Gallup, New Mexico with local law enforcement agencies and Joint Task Force 6 aboard the Zuni Indian Reservation. The Marines established observation posts and were tasked with determining possible air corridors for narcotics planes to drop drugs at designated drop zones. On 10 Oct 1994, the battalion planned to immediately deploy to Saudi Arabia after receiving a Southwest Asia Contingency Alert in response to the Iraqi military buildup along the Kuwaiti border. Operation VIGILANT WARRIOR quickly contained Iraq's aggressive posturing and 3d LAAD Bn stood down.

==== Air Defense in the Post Cold War Era ====
The Cold War ended with the collapse of the Soviet Union in December 1991. The days of a bi-polar world ended abruptly, almost unexpectedly. Washington military planners decided that the need for a robust, integrated air defense capability no longer existed. HAWK funding decreased until the last LAAM Battalion was deactivated in 1997. Due to maintenance costs, the Avenger and LAV-AD programs were discontinued. 4th LAAD Bn was deactivated in 2005. 1st Stinger Battery, a Cold War mainstay on the island of Okinawa, was deactivated in 2007. Throughout the first decade of the new millennium, 3rd LAAD Bn consistently achieved mission accomplishment amidst a demanding operational tempo. During this same period, the focus of military action has been on counterinsurgency warfare in Afghanistan and Iraq. However the battalion has continued to support the 11th, 13th, and 15th Marine Expeditionary Units and the Unit Deployment Program to this day.

=== Global War on Terror ===
On 11 September 2001 3d LAAD Bn Marines were again called to action. The LAAD Detachment assigned to the 15th MEU defended a critical Forward Arming and Refueling Point (FARP) in Pakistan.

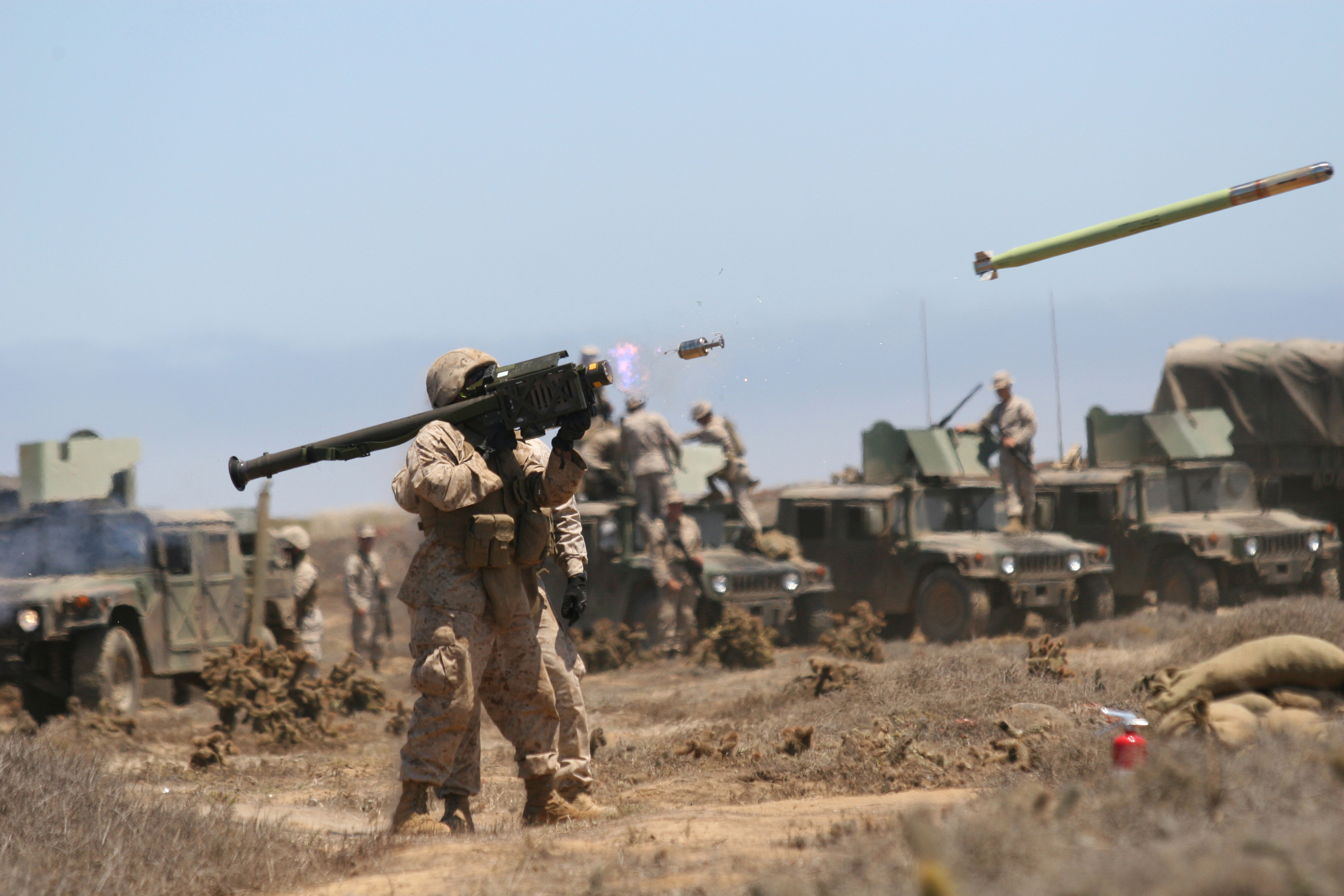
An NCO with 3d LAAD Battalion coaches a Marine as he fires an FIM-92A Stinger missile at an unmanned aerial target during training.

In January 2003, the battalion's training again focused on preparations for war in Iraq. By the end of January, the Offload Preparation Party and Arrival and Assembly Operations Element departed Camp Pendleton bound for Kuwait. A Battery's 1st Platoon departed for Kuwait on 27 January. On 5 February, the battalion's equipment was embarked aboard the USNS Soderman. Four days later, the remainder of the battalion departed March Air Force Base for Kuwait. By 13 February, the battalion consolidated at Ali Al Salem Air Base, Kuwait and dedicated its time to training and preparing for crossing the border into Iraq. On 24 Feb, the battalion departed Ali Al Salem for Camp Work Horse located in Tactical Assembly Area Coyote.

Prior to 21 March 2003, when Operation IRAQI FREEDOM began, the Defended Asset List experienced a variety of changes and forced 3d LAAD Bn Marines to plan dynamically. When the ground invasion began early on the morning of 21 March, 3d LAAD Bn Marines provided air defense for Marine Wing Support Squadron 271 (MWSS-271), MWSS-371, MWSS-372, MWSS-373, and served as a gap filler for a battalion from the Army's 108th Air Defense Artillery Brigade. The mission was to defend logistics convoys loaded with aviation fuel and ordnance that would be staged at FARPS along I MEF's path into Northern Iraq. These FARPs enabled helicopters to provide the Ground Combat Element with more timely close air support. As Saddam's Fadayeen put up a fight in places like An Nasiriyah, Qalat Sikar, and Al Kut, fuel and ordnance assumed critical importance and Marines from the battalion often found themselves in the midst of the fighting.

The battalion returned to Iraq in support of Operation IRAQI FREEDOM two more times in February 2004 and August 2006 to provide air base ground defense for Al Asad Air Base. 3d LAAD Bn was called on again in September 2007 to provide air base ground defense for Camp Lemonier, Djibouti, in support of Operation ENDURING FREEDOM. Most recently, 3d LAAD Bn provided ground security for Camp Leatherneck, Afghanistan, from February to September 2010 in support of Operation ENDURING FREEDOM.

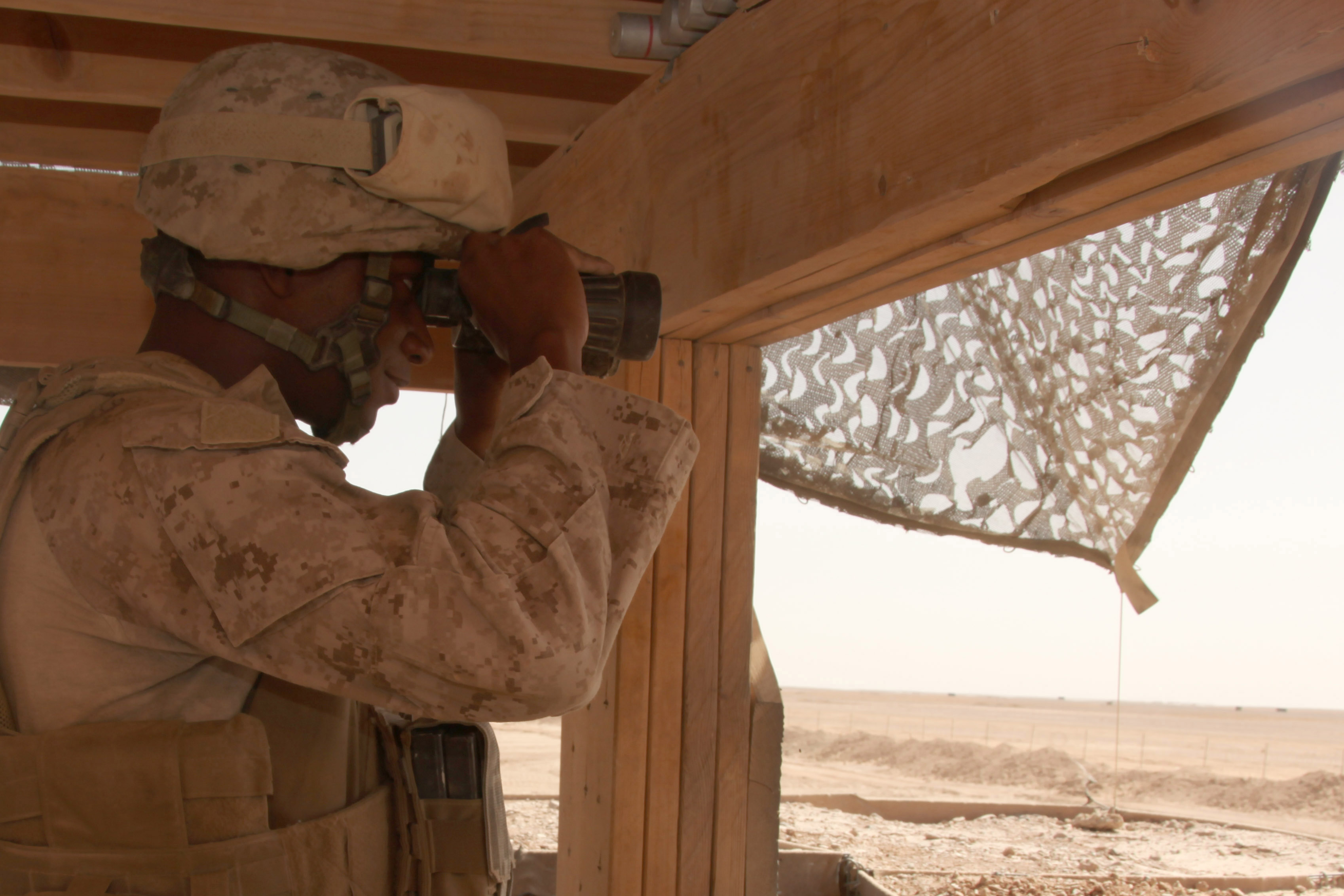
A Marine of 3d LAAD Battalion on guard.

3d LAAD Bn began training to provide Air Base Ground Defense for the Bastion/Leatherneck/Shorebak (BLS) Complex in Afghanistan's Helmand Province in the summer of 2009. The battalion was certified by instructors from Marine Aviation Weapons and Tactics Squadron 1 and the School of Infantry – West to conduct Military Entry Point (MEP), Tactical Recovery of Aircraft and Personnel (TRAP), mounted and dismounted patrol, IED sweep, and autonomous counterinsurgency (COIN) operations in January 2010. The battalion deployed in support of OPERATION ENDURING FREEDOM 10.1 as part of I MEF Headquarters Group the following month.

After conducting a battle hand-over with 5th Bn 10th Marines, 3d LAAD Bn immediately took ownership of its area of operations. Again displaying its utility and versatility on the battlefield, A Battery operated Camp Leatherneck's MEP, provided a TRAP force, conducted combat patrols, and trained Afghan forces. B Battery's mission focused on small unit decentralized COIN operations. Operating out of a small patrol base located 10 km south of the BLS Complex, B Battery patrolled through the settlements of Habib Abad, Now Abad, and Boldak. The squad-level patrols conducted key leader engagements, counter-IED patrolling, and human terrain mapping in an effort to counter the insurgent threat to the BLS Complex. Due to the efforts of Marines and Sailors of 3d LAAD Bn, the BLS Complex did not experience any attacks by insurgent forces while the battalion was deployed in support of OEF 10.1.

=== Post GWOT ===
With Operations winding down in Iraq and Afghanistan, 3rd LAAD Bn continued to focus on both Ground Based Air Defense while participating in numerous WTIs and Integrated Training Exercises (ITX-formerly known as EMV) as well as I MEF exercises such as Steel Knight and Desert Scimitar. In the spring of 2013 the battalion deployed the first iteration of the LAAD Unit Deployment Program Detachment to MCAS Futenma, Okinawa, Japan. In the spring of 2014, Bravo Battery (REIN) deployed to Jordan for Exercise Eager Lion. This was followed by Bravo Battery (REIN)'s deployment ISO Special Purpose MAGTF Crisis Response-CENTCOM (SP-MAGTF-CR-CC) in the fall of 2014.

On November 18, 2022, as part of the Marine Corps' efforts to modernize existing ground-based air defense capabilities, 3d LAAD Bn activated a new air defense battery. Charlie Battery exists as a task-organized battery to support platoon-level deployments throughout the I Marine Expeditionary Force area of responsibility, fielding new weapon systems to enable expeditionary counter-unmanned aerial systems operations in austere and isolated environments.

== Unit awards ==
A unit citation or commendation is an award bestowed upon an organization for the action cited. Members of the unit who participated in said actions are allowed to wear on their uniforms the awarded unit citation. 3d LAAD Bn has been presented with the following awards:

Ribbon	Unit Award
	Presidential Unit Citation
	Navy Unit Commendation with two Bronze Stars
	Meritorious Unit Commendation with three Bronze Stars
	National Defense Service Medal with one Bronze Star
	Southwest Asia Service Medal with three Bronze Stars
	Afghanistan Campaign Medal with one Bronze Star
	Iraq Campaign Medal with four Bronze Stars
	Global War on Terrorism Expeditionary Medal
	Global War on Terrorism Service Medal

Command Chronology

== Command Officers and Sergeants Major ==
3rd Forward Area Air Defense Battery (3rd FAADB)

- Major Ralph F. Marchewka 8 Mar 1982 – 1 Dec 1982
- Major J. L. Johnson 1 Dec 1982 – 2 Jun 1984
- Major R. J. Duhon 2 Jun 1984 – 9 Jul 1986
- Lieutenant Colonel Robert C. Dodt Jr. 9 Jun 1986 – 27 Jan 1987

3d Low Altitude Air Defense Battalion (3d LAAD Bn )

- Lieutenant Colonel Robert C. Dodt Jr. 27 Jan 1987 – 27 May 1988
- Lieutenant Colonel W. P. McElyea 27 May1988 – 13 Jul 1990
- Lieutenant Colonel G. S. Fick 13 Jul 1990 – 10 Jul 1992
- Lieutenant Colonel H. Attanasio 10 Jul 1990 – 28 Jan 1994
- Lieutenant Colonel T. L. Dempsey 28 Jan 1994 – 13 Jul 1995
- Lieutenant Colonel S. T. Elkins 13 Jul 1995 – 23 May 1997
- Lieutenant Colonel S. H. Mattos 23 May1997 – 15 Jan 1999
- Lieutenant Colonel C. W. Hocking 15 Jan 1999 – 1 Dec 2000
- Lieutenant Colonel C. S. Ames 1 Dec 2000 – 19 Jun 2002
- Lieutenant Colonel B. J. Altman 19 Jun 2002 – 8 Jan 2004
- Lieutenant Colonel M. P. Melzar 8 Jan 2004 – 8 Jul 2005
- Lieutenant Colonel S. M. Cunningham 8 Jul 2005 – 27 Apr 2007
- Lieutenant Colonel A. F. Potter 27 Apr 2007 – 23 Jan 2009
- Lieutenant Colonel M. C. Cancellier 23 Jan 2009 – 21 Oct 2010
- Lieutenant Colonel A. D. Weiss 21 Oct 2010 – 12 Apr 2012
- Lieutenant Colonel J. A. Vandaveer 12 Apr 2012 – 26 Sep 2013
- Lieutenant Colonel W. R. Zuber 26 Sep 2013 – 4 Jun 2015
- Lieutenant Colonel M. C. McCarthy 4 June 2015 – 9 Jun 2017
- Lieutenant Colonel H. R. Prokop 9 Jun 2017 – 20 Jun 2019
- Lieutenant Colonel M. Carlson 20 Jun 2019 – 3 Jun 2021
- Lieutenant Colonel J. Yurisic 3 Jun 2021 – 7 Jul 2023
- Lieutenant Colonel R. D. Gonzalez 7 Jul 2023 - 12 Jun 2025
- Lieutenant Colonel M. A. Arriaga 12 Jun 2025 - Present

SERGEANTS MAJOR

3rd Forward Area Air Defense Battery (3rd FAADB)

- Sergeant Major M. D. Zenzel 1986–1988

3d Low Altitude Air Defense Battalion (3d LAAD Bn)

- Sergeant Major R. Cortez 1988–1990
- Sergeant Major A. C. Brooks 1990–1992
- Sergeant Major M. G. Zacher 1992–1993
- Sergeant Major K. Hagen 1993–1995
- Sergeant Major J. Duff 1995–1997
- First Sergeant M. B. Robinson 5 Apr 1997 – 1 May 1997
- Sergeant Major J. T. Bunnel 1 May1997 – 20 Jun 1999
- Sergeant Major D. J. Fierle 20 Jun 1999 – 25 Jul 2003
- Sergeant Major A. D. Leflore 25 Jul 2003 – 19 Mar 2005
- Sergeant Major R. E. Jenness 19 Mar 2005 – 5 May 2007
- Sergeant Major J. E. Smith Jr. 5 May 2007 – 6 Feb 2010
- Sergeant Major K. V. Agee 6 Feb 2010 – 19 Jan 2010
- Sergeant Major A. Rivera 19 Jan 2010 – 27 Aug 2013
- Sergeant Major R. J. Alpizar 27 Aug 2013 – 2 Feb 2015
- Sergeant Major E. W. Rose 2 Feb 2015 – 8 Jun 2015
- Sergeant Major M. Palos 8 Jun 2015 – 6 Aug 2016
- First Sergeant V. D. Cruz 6 Aug 2016 – 15 Sep 2016
- Sergeant Major M. J. Brewer 15 Sep 2016 – 23 Jun 2017
- Sergeant Major R. W. Schieler 23 Jun 2017 - 23 May 2019
- Sergeant Major J. Romero Jr. 23 May 2019 - 1 Feb 2021
- Sergeant Major R. W. Ashby Jr. 1 Feb 2021 - 1 Dec 22
- Sergeant Major R. L. Broadway 1 Dec 22 - 11 Jun 2025
- Sergeant Major C. M. Thomas 11 Jun 2025 - Present

== See also ==
- List of United States Marine Corps battalions
- Organization of the United States Marine Corps
- History of ground based air defense in the United States Marine Corps
