= Marine Air Control Group 38 =

United States military unit

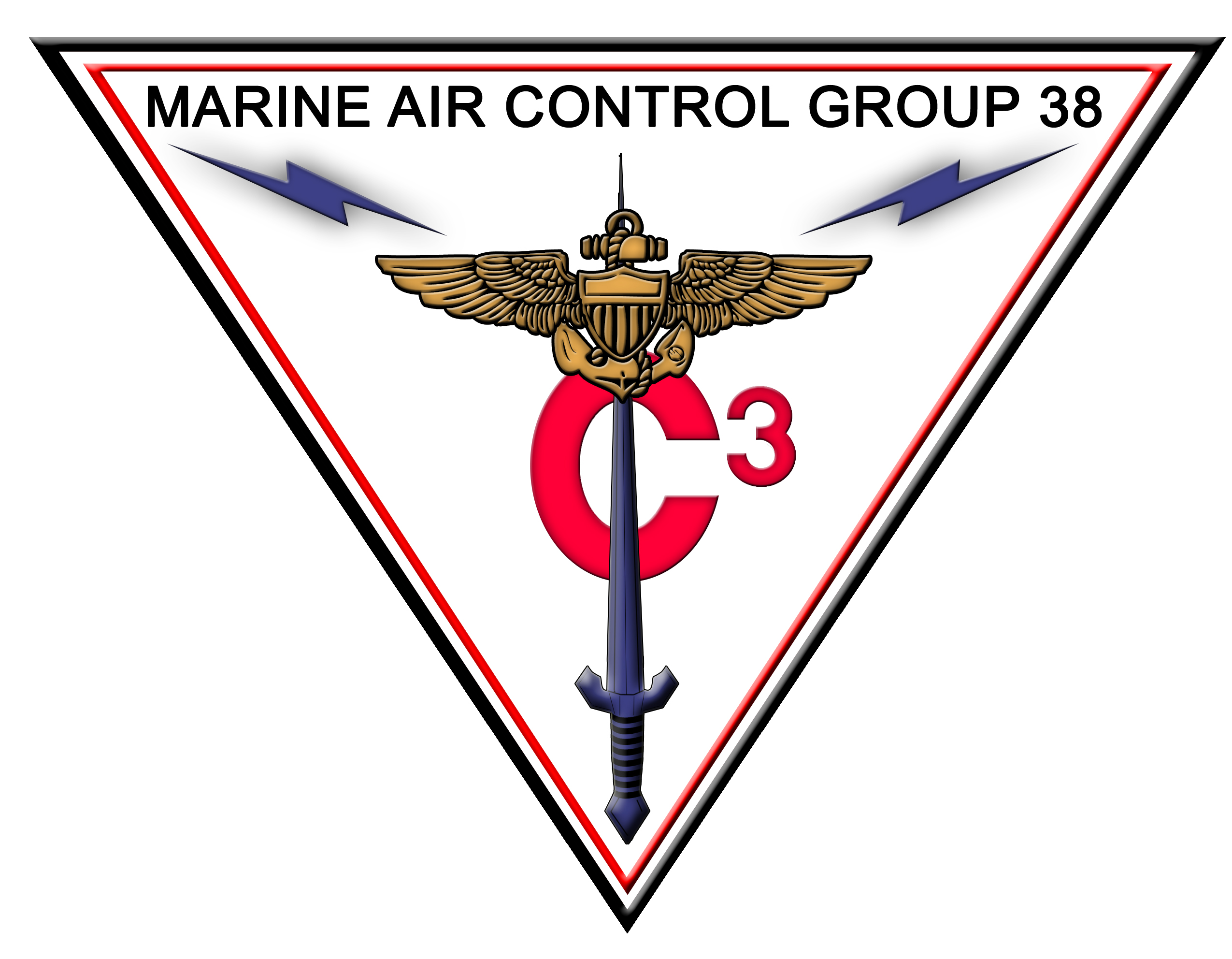
- MACG-38 insignia
- Active: 28 Mar 1951 - present
- Country: United States
- Allegiance: United States of America
- Branch: United States Marine Corps
- Role: Aviation command & control
- Part of: 3rd Marine Aircraft Wing; I Marine Expeditionary Force
- Garrison/HQ: Marine Corps Air Station Miramar
- Engagements: Operation Desert Storm; Operation Enduring Freedom; Operation Iraqi Freedom * 2003 invasion of Iraq

Commanders
- Current commander: Col. Edward J. O'Connell IV

Marine Air Control Group 38 (MACG-38) is a United States Marine Corps aviation command and control unit based at Marine Corps Air Station Miramar that is currently composed of four squadrons and one battalion that provide the 3rd Marine Aircraft Wing's tactical headquarters, positive and procedural control to aircraft, and air defense support for the I Marine Expeditionary Force.

== Mission ==
Provide a task-organized Marine Air Command and Control System (MACCS) in order to enable the six functions of Marine Aviation in support of the MAGTF's Aviation Combat Element.

== Subordinate units ==
- 3rd Low Altitude Air Defense Battalion
- Marine Air Control Squadron 1
- Marine Air Support Squadron 3
- Marine Wing Communications Squadron 38
- Marine Wing Support Squadron 371
- Marine Wing Support Squadron 372
- Marine Wing Support Squadron 373

== History ==
=== 1950s ===
Marine Air Control Group 3 was commissioned on 28 March 1951 at Marine Corps Air Station El Toro, California. The group was formed during the Korean War to replace Marine Air Control Group 2 that deployed to South Korea in March and April 1951. Following the end of the Korean War and a restructure within Marine Corps aviation, MACG-3 was decommissioned on 31 December 1955.

=== Reactivation through the 1980s ===
The Group was reactivated on 1 September 1967, at MCAS El Toro.

=== Desert Storm & the 1990s ===
MACG-38 deployed to Saudi Arabia in August 1990 and later supported Operation Desert Storm. Elements of the group have supported Operation Restore Hope, Operation Safe Departure, Operation Southern Watch and Operation Stabilise. The group relocated to MCAS Miramar in October 1998.

=== War on Terror to present ===
MACG-38 began planning for a possible invasion of Iraq during the summer of 2002. The groups first units began deploying to Kuwait in October 2002 as part of Exercise Internal Look. The 2003 invasion of Iraq eventually required not only all of MACG-38 but also almost all of Marine Air Control Group 28 and a significant number of augments including reservists from Marine Air Control Group 48 and Marine Aviation Weapons and Tactics Squadron 1 (MAWTS-1). MACG-38 personnel continued to deploy today in support of Operation Iraqi Freedom from January 2004 through early 2009. During security and stabilization operations the group was headquartered at Al Asad Airbase in the Al Anbar Province.

Most recently the Group deployed to Camp Leatherneck, Afghanistan in March 2010. It was again responsible for providing aviation command and control for the I Marine Expeditionary Force (I MEF) in support of Operation Enduring Freedom. The group returned to the United States in the Spring of 2011.

In the summer of 2002, planning for the possible invasion of Iraq began in earnest for west coast MACCS units attached to the I Marine Expeditionary Force (IMEF). I MEF had the lead for planning the 2003 invasion of Iraq however the scope and scale of

== See also ==
- United States Marine Corps Aviation
- List of United States Marine Corps aircraft groups
- List of United States Marine Corps aviation support squadrons
