= Marine Wing Support Squadron 373 =

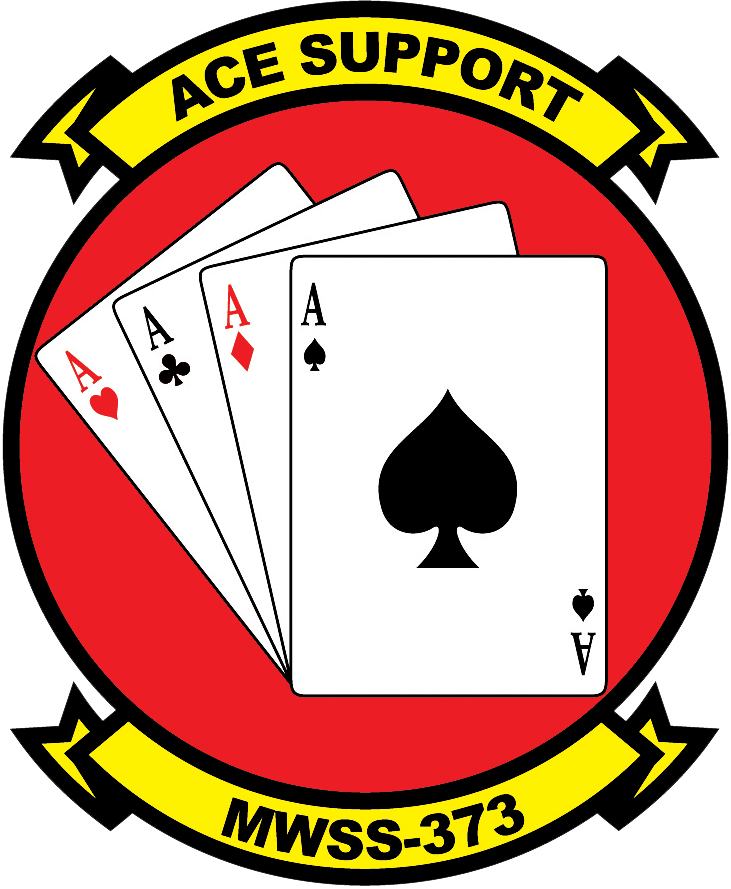
- MWSS-373 insignia
- Active: 1 April 1967 – present
- Country: United States
- Allegiance: United States
- Branch: United States Marine Corps
- Type: Aviation ground support squadron
- Size: 700
- Part of: Marine Air Control Group 38; 3rd Marine Aircraft Wing
- Garrison/HQ: Marine Corps Air Station Miramar
- Nickname: Ace Support
- Engagements: Operation Desert Storm; Operation Iraqi Freedom; Operation Enduring Freedom

Commanders
- Current commander: LtCol Steven B. Dodson

The Marine Wing Support Squadron 373 (MWSS 373) is an aviation ground support unit of the United States Marine Corps. They are based out of Marine Corps Air Station Miramar, California. The squadron is part of Marine Air Control Group 38 and the 3rd Marine Aircraft Wing.

== Mission ==
Provide all essential aviation ground requirements to a designated fixed-wing component of a Marine Aviation Combat Element or to supplement air base facilities and services provided by a Marine Corps Air Station, when based thereon. This includes motor vehicle support, mobile electric power, heavy equipment, tactical aviation refueling, essential runway services, and second echelon maintenance. They are tasked to conduct airfield operations, less air traffic control, for supporting Aviation Combat Element units to include: internal airfield communications, weather, services expeditionary airfield services, crash/fire/rescue and structural fire fighting services, aircraft and rapid ground refueling, motor transport for operations internal to air base messing facilities, routine and emergency sick call and aviation medical functions, individual and unit training of organic personnel and personnel of selected support units, organic nuclear, biological and chemical (NBC) defense, security and law enforcement services

== History ==
=== Early years ===
Marine Wing Support Squadron 373 (MWSS-373) can trace its lineage back to Wing Equipment and Repair Squadron 37 (WERS-37) activated on 1 April 1967 at Marine Corps Air Station El Toro, Santa Ana, California. On 31 January 1977, WERS-37 was restructured and re-designated as Wing Transportation Squadron 37 (WTS-37) as a result of the Marine Corps wide Combat Service Support reorganization concept, effected 5 June 1986. On 21 August 1998, MWSS-373 relocated from MCAS El Toro to Marine Corps Air Station Miramar.

=== The Gulf War and the 1990s ===
During August 1990 through April 1991 MWSS-373 participated in Operation Desert Shield and Operation Desert Storm in Saudi Arabia and Kuwait; while in Southwest Asia, the Marines and Sailors of MWSS-373 pumped over 29 million US gallons (110,000 m^{3}) of fuel to tactical aircraft, provided over 2 million meals, transported 46 million pounds of ordnance, produced 2 million US gallons (7,600 m^{3}) of potable water, treated 18,000 patients, administered 3,200 immunizations, provided water electricity and sanitation for 8 dispersed billeting areas and drove over 1 million accident free miles.

In July 1992, MWSS-373 became the first support squadron in the I Marine Expeditionary Force to obtain 100% readiness. In September 1992, MWSS-373 welcomed aboard the Explosive Ordnance Disposal (EOD) unit from Marine Aviation Logistics Squadron 11, adding a new dimension to the squadron. During December 1992 to May 1993, MWSS-373 provided 24-hour airfield embarkation support at MCAS El Toro for units deploying to Somalia in support of Operation Restore Hope. In providing this support, the Marines of MWSS-373 loaded over 100 aircraft with eight million pounds of cargo and equipment. Between January and March 1995, MWSS-373 deployed a detachment to Somalia in support of Operation United Shield to assist with the UN' withdrawal from that country. From 19 August 1995 to 19 October 1995, MWSS-373 also deployed an Offload Preparation Party detachment of 11 Marines to the 15th MEU(Marine Expeditionary Unit) as part of Operation Vigilant Sentinel a larger U.S. effort to deter Iraqi interference with United Nations' arms inspections and in response to claims by high-ranking military defectors of the Iraqi armed forces that Saddam Hussein was massing forces near the Kuwaiti border. During August 1998, MWSS-373 relocated to MCAS Miramar, San Diego, California as part of a base realignment and closure (BRAC) directed move.

=== Global War on Terror ===
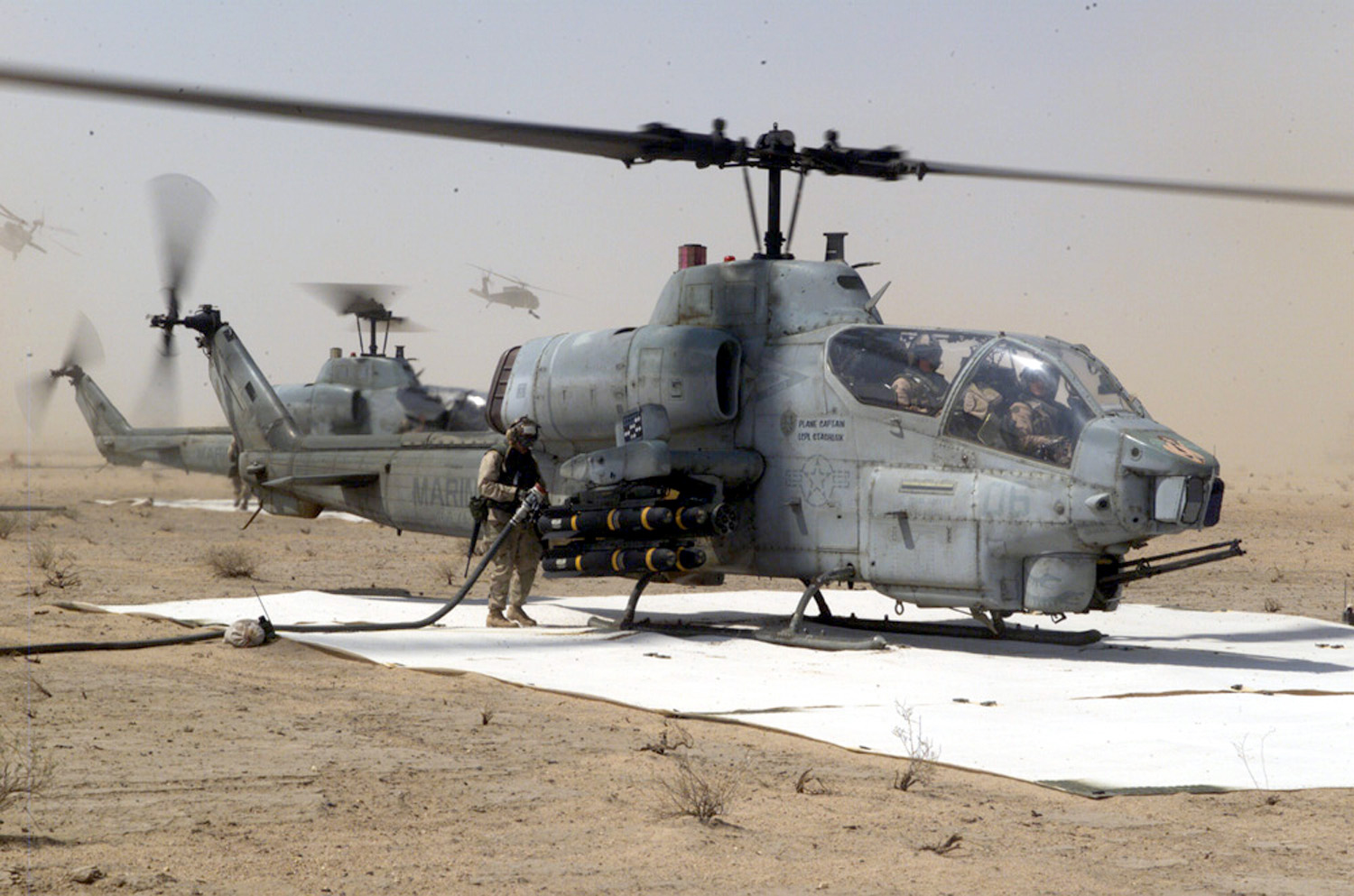
Cobra attack helicopters being refueled at a MWSS-373 FARP during Operation Iraqi Freedom.

From September 2001 through present MWSS-373 deployed personnel and equipment in support of Operation Enduring Freedom and Operation Iraqi Freedom in support of four separate Marine Expeditionary Units. In addition personnel were deployed on aircraft carriers in support of three separate VMFA Squadrons. From September 2002 through present MWSS-373 deployed personnel and equipment to Afghanistan in support of VMA-513 during Operation Enduring Freedom. From January to June 2003 MWSS-373 deployed to Kuwait and Iraq in support of Operation Iraqi Freedom. MWSS 373 constructed a 4,000 Marine base camp, and installed a 431,000-square-foot (40,000 m^{2}) Harrier parking ramp, at Al Jaber Air Base, Kuwait for elements of the 3rd Marine Aircraft Wing. During March 2003 MWSS-373 conducted FARP operations (Forward Arming and Refueling Point) in the vicinity of Jalibah Airfield, Iraq in support of the attack on An Nasiriyah. Rapid runway repair of a 5,000-foot (1,500 m) KC-130 operating strip at Jalibah Airfield was completed on the third night of the ground war. MWSS-373 went on and constructed a 3,000 Marine forward operating base (FOB) at Jalibah Airfield, Iraq in support of elements of 3rd MAW. During the month of April 2003, MWSS-373 continued to conduct FARP operations at Tikrit Airfield, Iraq (northernmost USMC FARP in Iraq) and Ad Diwaniyah, Iraq.

In August 2004 MWSS-373 deployed to Al Taqaddum to support 3rd MAW in providing aviation ground support in Al Anbar Province. They also provided aviation ground support and limited combat service support from Camp Korean Village, Camp Mudaysis, FOB Duke, and Camp Fallujah. In support of Operation Al Fajr in Fallujah, MWSS-373 provided fire fighting to respond to life-threatening off-base U.S. and Coalition force structural and vehicle fires, and Explosive Ordnance Disposal support to clear main supply routes between Al Taqaddum and Al Fallujah. Aboard Al TQ, 373-Engineer Company established camp at La Jolla Village. At the conclusion of this deployment, MWSS-373 closed Camp Mudaysis.

In September 2006, MWSS-373 again deployed again to Al Taqaddum, Iraq in support of 3rd MAW. During this period MWSS-373 provided functions of aviation ground support and limited combat service support at Al Taqaddum, Camp Ramadi, Camp Fallujah, and Camp Korean Village. MWSS-373 provided response teams for IED activity in the vicinity of Al Taqaddum and Camp Korean Village. Additionally, MWSS-373 numerous road improvement projects, helicopter landing zone installations, and facility electrical renovations at sites throughout the Euphrates River corridor between Ar Ramadi and Al Fallujah.

In September 2010, MWSS-373 deployed to Camp Leatherneck, Afghanistan in support of Operation Enduring Freedom. While deployed MWSS-373 supplied all ground aviation support for Camp Leatherneck, FOB Dwyer, FOB Delaram and FOB Edinburgh. They also completed numerous Helicopter Landing Zone improvement projects across the Helmand province and finalized the construction of a C-130 air strip in Forward Operating Base Delaram. By April 2011, all Marines who deployed with MWSS-373 returned to Marine Corps Air Station Miramar safely.

== See also ==
- United States Marine Corps Aviation
- Organization of the United States Marine Corps
- List of United States Marine Corps aviation support units
