= Marine Wing Support Squadron 371 =

Marine Aircraft Group 13
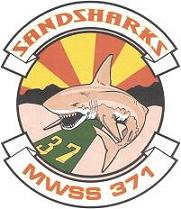
- MWSS-371's insignia
- Active: 2 June 1986 – present
- Country: United States
- Allegiance: United States of America
- Branch: United States Marine Corps
- Type: Aviation ground support battalion
- Part of: Marine Wing Support Group 37; 3rd Marine Aircraft Wing
- Garrison/HQ: Marine Corps Air Station Yuma
- Nickname(s): "Sand Sharks"
- Engagements: Operation Desert Storm; Operation Iraqi Freedom * 2003 invasion of Iraq; Operation Enduring Freedom

Commanders
- Current commander: Lieutenant Colonel Joshua W. Munsee
- Notable commanders: Lieutenant Colonel Brent L. Kershaw

Marine Wing Support Squadron 371 (MWSS 371) is an aviation ground support unit of the United States Marine Corps. They are based out of Marine Corps Air Station Yuma, Arizona. The squadron is part of Marine Air Control Group 38 and the 3rd Marine Aircraft Wing.

== Mission ==
Provide all essential Aviation Ground Support requirements to a designated fixed-wing component of an Aviation Combat Element (ACE) and all supporting or attached elements of the Marine Air Control Group.

== History ==
Marine Wing Support Squadron 371 was activated on 2 June 1986 at Marine Corps Air Station El Toro, California. They relocated during April 1987 to MCAS Yuma, Arizona. The squadrons first combat deployment was in support of Operation Desert Storm in Southwest Asia from August 1990 to April 1991. Elements of MWSS-371 have also participated in Operation Restore Hope in Somalia from January to May 1993 and Operation Southern Watch over Iraq from March to June 2001. They also deployed for Operation Iraqi Freedom in 2003, 2005, 2007 and to Afghanistan in support of Operation Enduring Freedom in 2009.

== See also ==
- United States Marine Corps Aviation
- Organization of the United States Marine Corps
- List of United States Marine Corps aviation support units
