= Marine Wing Support Squadron 372 =

Aviation ground support unit of the United States Marine Corps

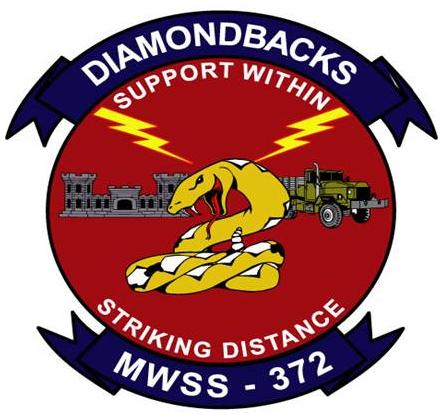
- MWSS-372's insignia
- Active: 1 July 1977 – present
- Country: United States
- Allegiance: United States of America
- Branch: Marine Corps
- Type: Aviation ground support squadron
- Role: Engineering/Logistics
- Size: ~380
- Part of: Marine Air Control Group 38; 3rd Marine Aircraft Wing
- Garrison/HQ: Marine Corps Base Camp Pendleton
- Nickname: Diamondbacks
- Motto: "Support Within Striking Distance" "Ours is a Warrior Culture...Be Excellent...Fear No One!"
- Colors: Scarlet & Gold
- Mascot: Western Diamondback Rattlesnake
- Anniversaries: 2 June
- Engagements: Gulf War; Operation Restore Hope; Operation Iraqi Freedom; Operation Enduring Freedom
- Website: https://www.3rdmaw.marines.mil/Units/MAG-39/MWSS-372/

Commanders
- Current commander: Lt Col Kristofer A. Skidmore

Marine Wing Support Squadron 372 (MWSS 372) is an aviation ground support unit of the United States Marine Corps. Known as the "Diamondbacks", the squadron is based at Marine Corps Base Camp Pendleton, California. It falls under the command of Marine Air Control Group 38 and the 3rd Marine Aircraft Wing and maintains a direct support relationship to Marine Aircraft Group 39.

== Mission ==
MWSS-372 task organizes to conduct direct aviation ground support for Marine Aircraft Group 39 or other designated aviation forces. This is accomplished through establishing and supporting expeditionary aviation shore-based sites through forward aviation combat engineering, flight line operations, forward arming and refueling points, airfield damage repair, and aircraft salvage and recovery in order to enable expeditionary aviation operations.

== History ==
=== 1980s & 1990s ===
MWSS-372 was commissioned on 2 June 1986, aboard Marine Corps Base Camp Pendleton, California. The squadron was responsible for providing Aviation Ground Support (AGS) to Marine Aircraft Group 39 (MAG-39). Prior to commissioning, the unit was known as Detachment "A", Marine Wing Support Group 37 (MWSG-37), which formed on 1 July 1977.

In 1990, the Squadron deployed to Southwest Asia during Operation Desert Shield / Desert Storm. Over 300 MWSS-372 Marines deployed as part of the military buildup in Saudi Arabia and the subsequent combat operations throughout Kuwait and Iraq.

Not long after the Squadron’s return, MWSS-372 deployed to Somalia in December 1992 in support of Operation Restore Hope. After conducting support operations out of the capital of Mogadishu, the squadron pushed inland and established an initial AGS capability at Baledogle Airfield and a Forward Arming and Refueling Point (FARP) in Baidoa until redeployment back in Mogadishu when the Marine Corps' mission ended.

In January 1993, MCAS Camp Pendleton was devastated by the flooding of the Santa Margarita River, completely shutting down aviation operations and destroying millions of dollars of equipment. MWSS-372(-), despite having most of the Unit’s personnel and equipment in Somalia, spearheaded the recovery with communications, heavy equipment, and construction support. The Unit was awarded the Navy Unit Commendation in recognition for these efforts.

In December 1996, the Squadron completed construction of the first K-Span structure build aboard MCAS Camp Pendleton, providing Marine Aviation Logistics Squadron 39 with a cost-efficient means to accommodate the growing maintenance demands of the next millennium.

=== Iraq & Afghanistan ===
In January 2003, MWSS-372 deployed to Kuwait and augmented the offload preparation party with the reception of Maritime Prepositioned Equipment and Supplies (MPE/S) at the port of Shuiaba. In March 2003, the squadron took part in the invasion of Iraq. While supporting Marine aviation elements through strategic Forward arming and refuelling points (FARPs), the squadron also dispensed fuel to Army medevac aircraft as well as Marine tanks and assault amphibious vehicles during the push north to Baghdad. On 8 April 2003, during the run to Baghdad, MWSS-372 and a detachment of US Navy Seabees, cleared obstacles and reopened the 9000-foot runway at Salman Pak East.

In November 2005, the Squadron was again forward deployed to Iraq in support of OIF. In addition to providing AGS to 2d Marine Aircraft Wing (Forward), the "Diamondbacks" participated in combat operations with the 2d Marine Division during two historic Iraqi elections during OIF 04-06.2.

In recognition of MWSS-372’s outstanding performance in CONUS and Iraq throughout 2005, the Squadron formally received two major awards. The Engineer Operations Company was named Engineer Company of the Year by the Marine Corps Engineer Association (MCEA) and the Squadron received the 2006 Hatch Award (MWSS of the Year) from the Marine Corps Aviation Association (MCAA).

From August 2007 to March 2008, the Unit was called to support Multi-National Force–West (MNF-W) at sites across Iraq, to include: Al Asad Airbase, Al Qa’im, Mudaysis, and Fallujah.

In September 2009, the Diamondbacks deployed in full to Southern Afghanistan to support Operation Enduring Freedom (OEF) 9.2. The deployment culminated with MWSS-372 Marines providing FARP support to aircraft inserting Marines into the Taliban stronghold of Marjeh during Operation Moshtarak, the largest military operation in the Afghan War.

In April 2012, MWSS-372 transferred parent commands from MWSG-37 to MAG-39. This realignment strengthened the relationship between the MWSS and supported flying squadrons and allowed for more flexible and timely AGS to MAG-39.

From September 2013 to April 2014, MWSS-372 deployed to Afghanistan in support of OEF 13.2 and assumed responsibility for providing AGS to units within ISAF Regional Command Southwest. For the Squadron’s exceptional performance during 2013, it was again recognized as the MWSS of the Year by the MCAA.

MWSS-372 was most recently recognized as the MWSS of the Year in 2024 for sustained meritorious service while providing exceptional aviation ground support to Marine Corps Air Station Camp Pendelton, 3d Marine Aircraft Wing, and sister service units across the globe. Marine Wing Support Squadron 372 demonstrated superior performance and operational impact through multiple exercises and operations as the foremost aviation ground support unit, leading the way in coordinating joint force efforts and providing effective combat service support across the MAGTF. Notably, the Squadron served as MACG-58 during the execution of Weapons and Tactics Instructor Course 2-24, a first for an MWSS. MACG-58 comprised seven subordinate units and over 1,000 marines and sailors from the aviation ground support and aviation command and control communities.

== Gallery ==
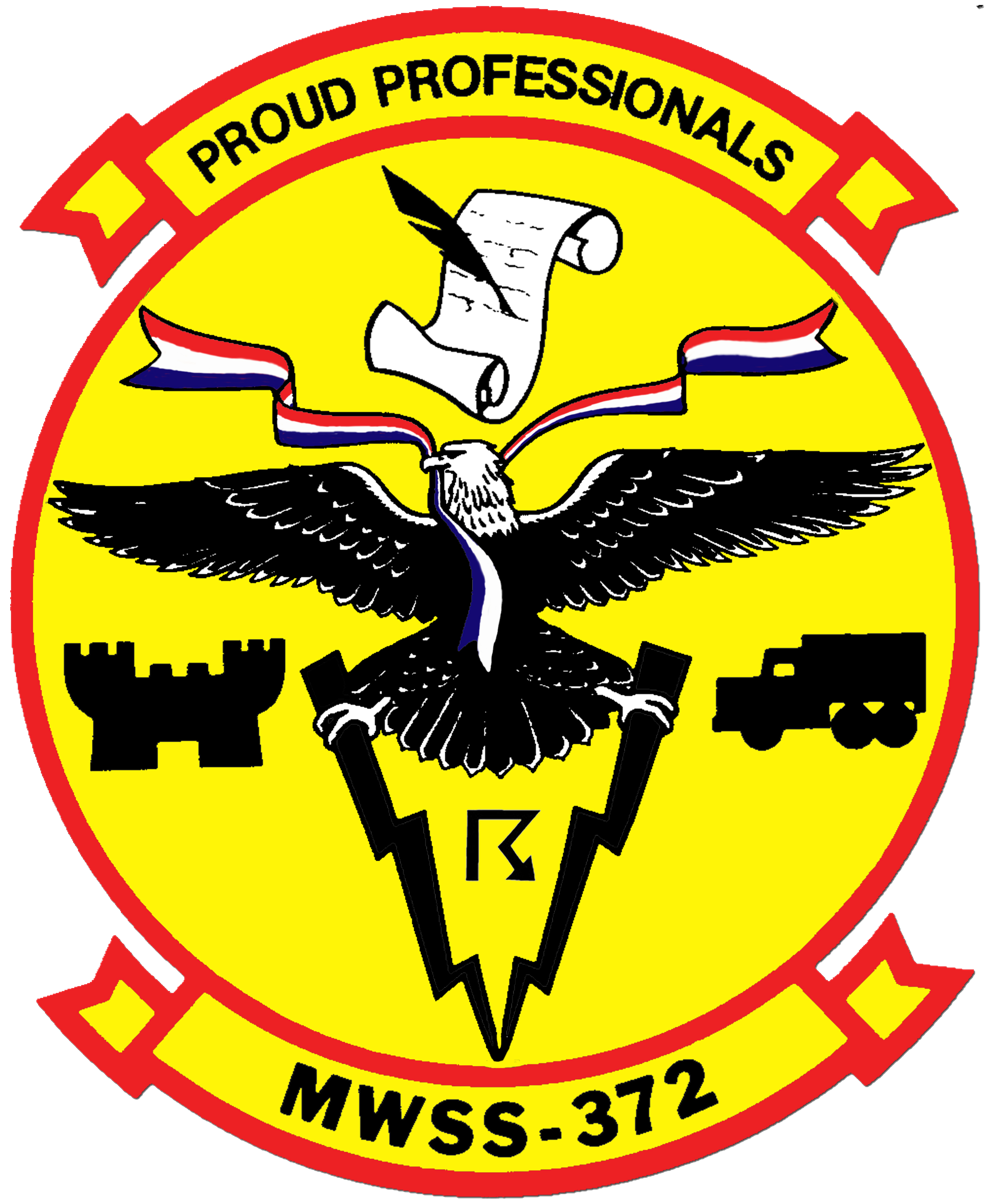
Squadron logo from the 1990s

== Unit awards ==
Since the beginning of World War II, the United States military has honored various units for extraordinary heroism or outstanding non-combat service. This information is compiled by the United States Marine Corps History Division and is certified by the Commandant of the Marine Corps. MWSS-372 has been awarded the following unit awards:

| Streamer | Award | Year(s) | Additional Info |
|---|---|---|---|
| A streamer with red, gold, and blue horizontal stripes with a bronze star in the center | Presidential Unit Citation Streamer with one Bronze Star | 2003, 2009-2010 | Iraq, Afghanistan |
| | Joint Meritorious Unit Award Streamer | 1992–1993 | Somalia |
| | Navy Unit Commendation Streamer with two Bronze Stars | 1990–1991, 1992-1994, 2007–2008 | Southwest Asia, Iraq |
| | Meritorious Unit Commendation Streamer with two Bronze Stars (*3rd Bronze Star pending) | 1988–1989, 1997-1998, 2010–2012, 2023-2024* | |
| | National Defense Service Streamer with three Bronze Stars | 1990–1995, 2001–2022 | Gulf War, war on terrorism |
| A multicolored streamer with (from outer to inner) green, yellow, brown, black, light blue, dark blue, white, and red horizontal stripes | Armed Forces Expeditionary Streamer | | |
| | Afghanistan Campaign Streamer with three bronze stars | 2010, 2011–2012 | Consolidation III, Transition I |
| | Iraq Campaign Streamer | | |
| | Global War on Terrorism Expeditionary Streamer | 2001–present | |
| A blue streamer with yellow, red, and white horizontal stripes | Global War on Terrorism Service Streamer | 2001–present | |

== See also ==
- United States Marine Corps Aviation
- Organization of the United States Marine Corps
- List of United States Marine Corps aviation support units
