= 3rd Marine Aircraft Wing =

United States military unit

3d Marine Aircraft Wing
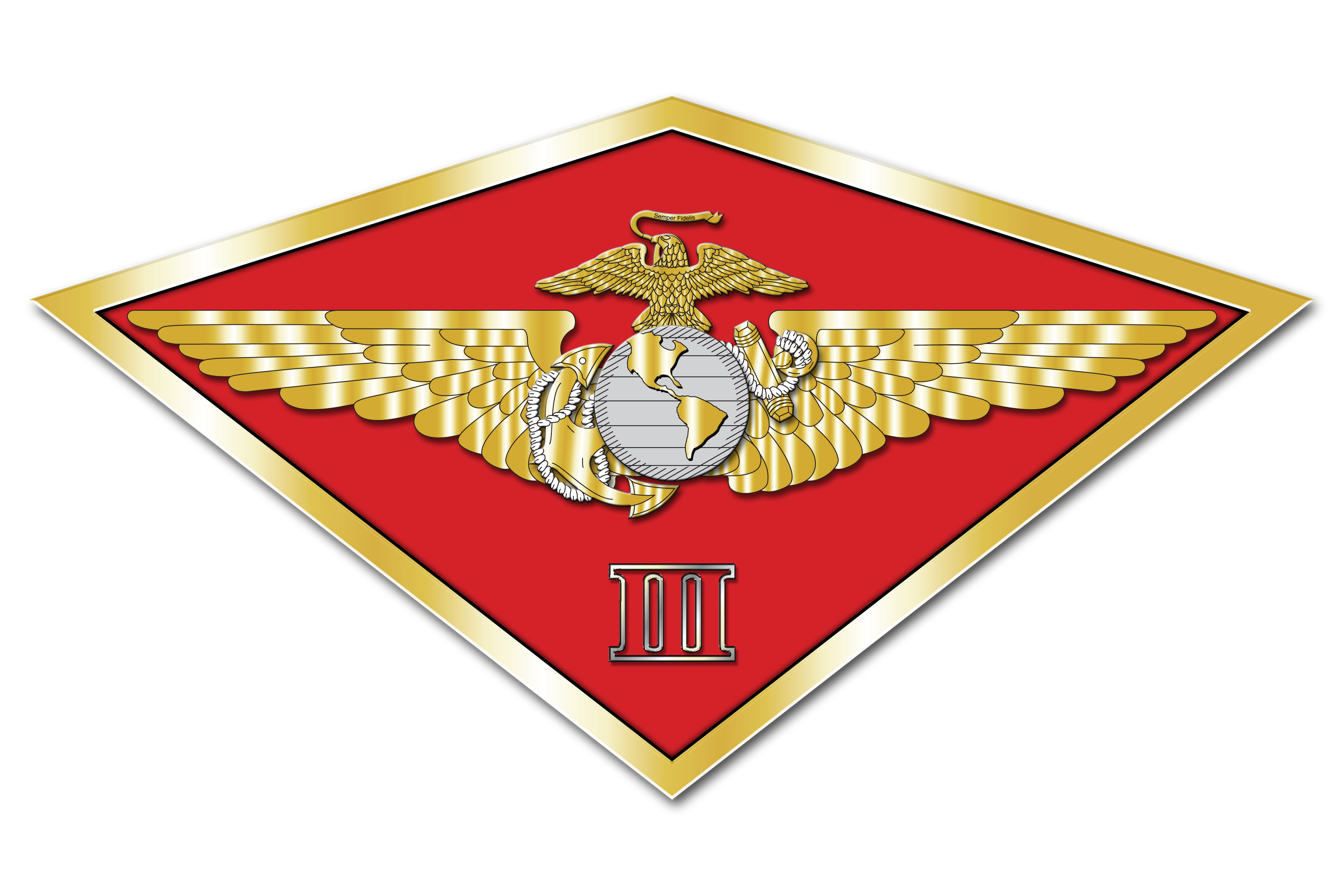
- 3rd MAW insignia
- Active: 10 November 1942–; 31 December 1945; 1 February 1952–present
- Country: United States
- Branch: United States Marine Corps Aviation
- Type: Aviation combat element
- Role: Air operations in support of the Fleet Marine Forces
- Part of: I Marine Expeditionary Force
- Garrison/HQ: Marine Corps Air Station Miramar
- Motto: Bella Ac Pace Paratus
- Engagements: World War II: Asiatic-Pacific Theater; Vietnam War; Gulf War: Operation Desert Storm; Iraq War: 2003 invasion of Iraq; Operation Vigilant Resolve; Operation Phantom Fury; War on cartels: Operation Southern Spear; Operation Absolute Resolve

Commanders
- Commanding General: MajGen Robert B. Brodie
- Assistant Wing Commander: BGen Daniel B. Taylor
- Notable commanders: James F. Amos; Byron F. Johnson; John P. Condon; Frank C. Lang; Robert G. Owens Jr.; Homer S. Hill

Insignia
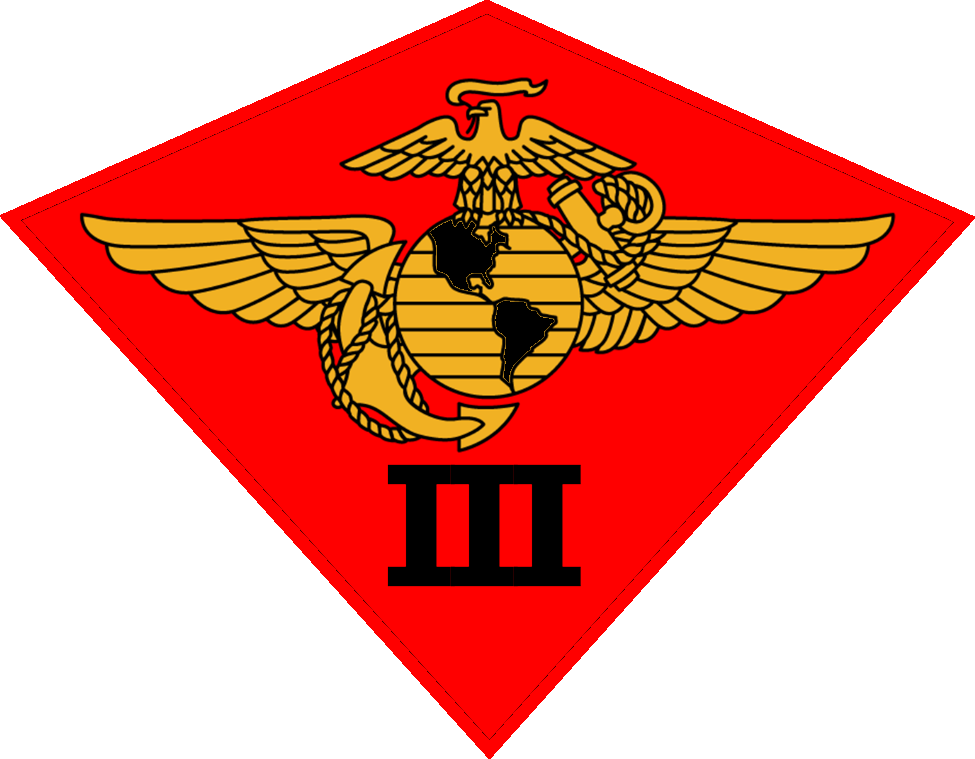
- Late WWII 3rd MAW Insignia

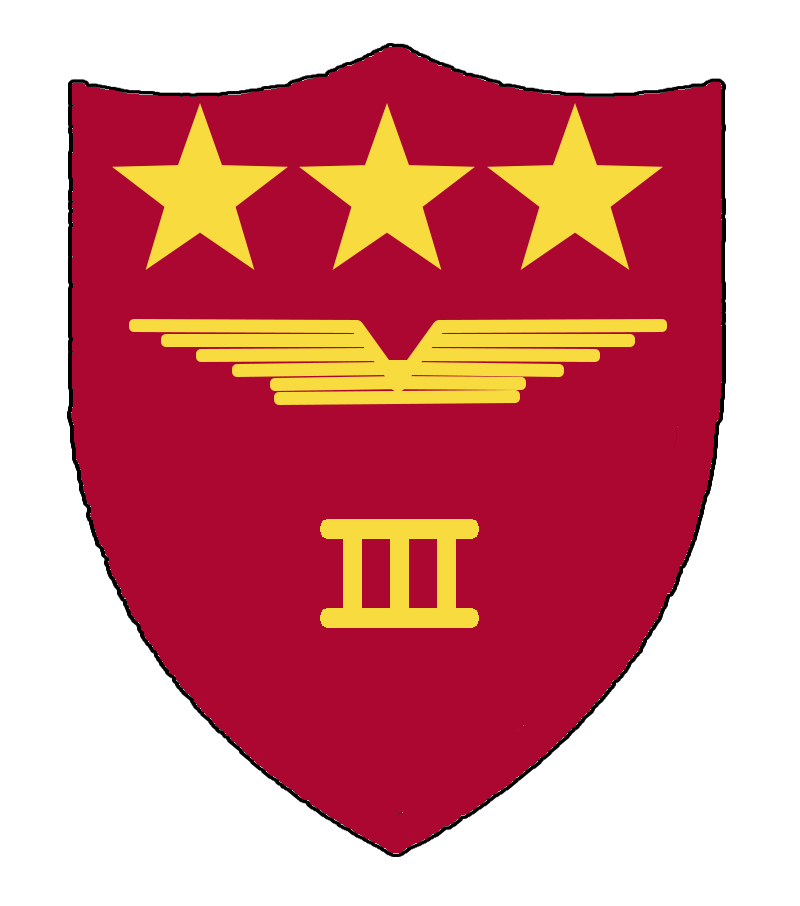
- Early WWII 3rd MAW Insignia

The 3rd Marine Aircraft Wing (abbreviated as 3rd MAW) is the major west coast aviation unit of the United States Marine Corps. It is headquartered at Marine Corps Air Station Miramar, in San Diego, California, and provides the aviation combat element for I Marine Expeditionary Force. The wing is made up of a headquarters squadron, four flying groups, an aviation command and control group and an aviation engineering group.

== Mission ==
Provide combat ready expeditionary aviation forces capable of short notice worldwide deployment to Marine Air-Ground Task Force (MAGTF), fleet and unified commanders.

== Organization ==
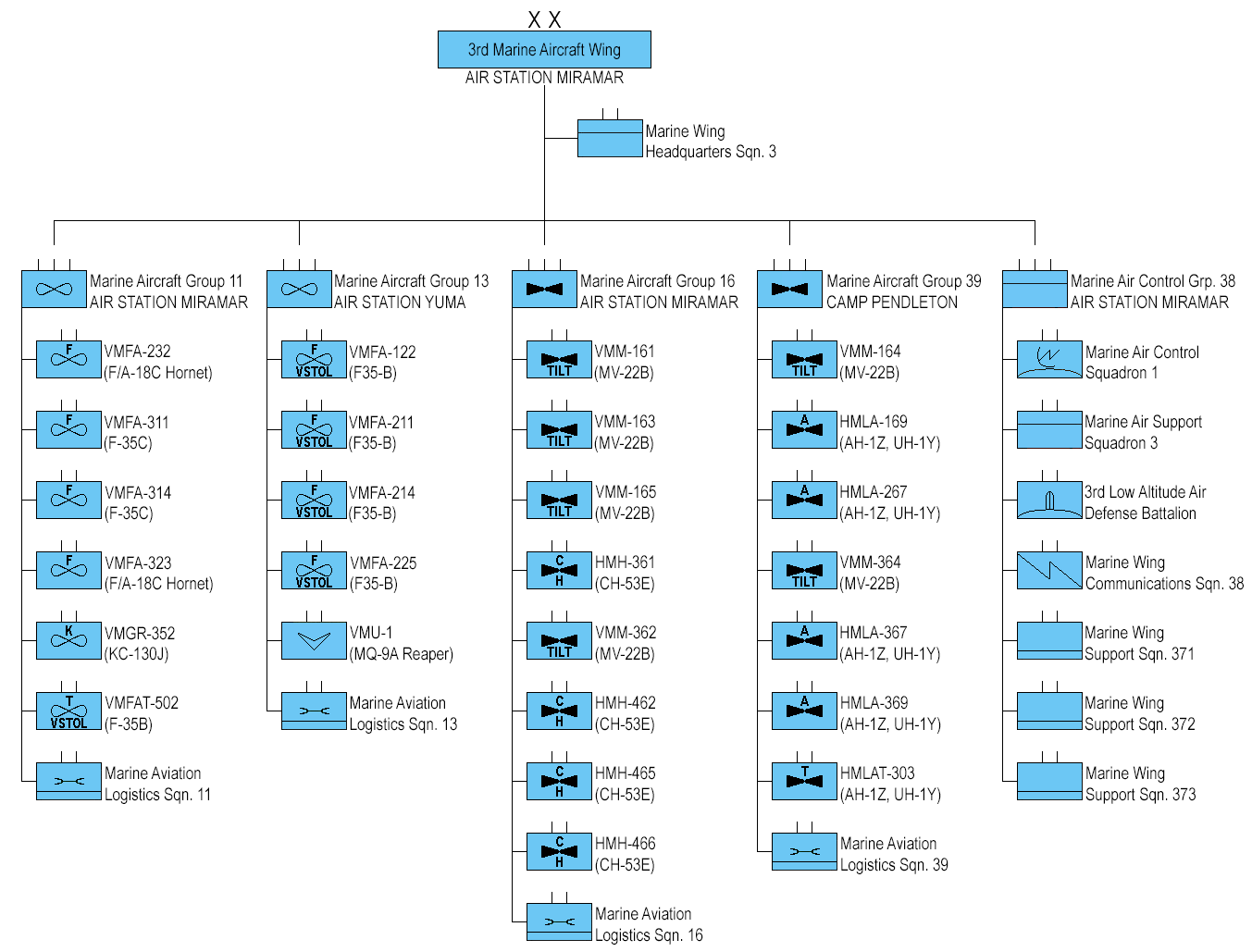
3rd Marine Aircraft Wing organization as of May 2026 (click to enlarge)

As of May 2026 the 3rd Marine Aircraft Wing consists of the following units:

- Marine Wing Headquarters Squadron 3
- Marine Aircraft Group 11, at Marine Corps Air Station Miramar
- Marine Aircraft Group 13, at Marine Corps Air Station Yuma
- Marine Aircraft Group 16, at Marine Corps Air Station Miramar
- Marine Air Control Group 38, at Marine Corps Air Station Miramar
- Marine Aircraft Group 39, at Marine Corps Base Camp Pendleton
- Marine Corps Air Ground Combat Center Twentynine Palms
- 3rd Marine Aircraft Wing Band

== History ==
=== World War II ===
3rd Marine Aircraft Wing was commissioned on 10 November 1942, at Marine Corps Air Station Cherry Point, North Carolina, with a personnel roster of 13 officers, 25 enlisted men and one aircraft, a trainer.

The Wing's combat history began with the World War II deployment of a bomber squadron on 3 December 1943. A little more than a year later, the Wing deployed a night fighter squadron in support of the war effort.

In early April 1944, the wing turned over its training duties and assigned units to the 9th Marine Aircraft Wing and on 21 April 1944, boarded three carriers USS Gambier Bay CVE-73, USS Hoggat Bay CVE-75, and USS Kitkun Bay CVE-71 for a voyage to Hawaii and arrived 8 May, where it assumed the functions of Marine Air, Hawaii Area (MAHA).

When the Japanese surrendered, 3rd MAW was decommissioned on 31 December 1945, at Marine Corps Air Station Ewa and its personnel were assigned to other units. The Wing also played an important, but behind-the-scenes, role during the war by training Marine pilots and support personnel for combat duty overseas.

=== 1950s ===
In 1952, as the Marine Corps again fought in the Far East, the Wing was reactivated at MCAS Cherry Point for the Korean War. The main portion of the wing began moving to the new Marine Corps Air Station Miami, the Marine Corps' first "flying field."

In September 1955, the Wing left MCAS Miami for Marine Corps Air Station El Toro, California. 3rd MAW was rebuilt again, with the addition of Marine Aircraft Group 15, followed by Marine Aircraft Group 36 on 5 September 1955, with its helicopter squadrons at the nearby Marine Corps Air Facility Santa Ana, later renamed Marine Corps Air Station Tustin.

=== Vietnam War through the 1980s ===
Wing squadrons were detached and deployed to Vietnam as combat action in Southeast Asia flared. At the end of the Vietnam War several units were brought back to the United States and deactivated or redesignated, creating 3rd Marine Aircraft Wing as it is constituted today.

=== The Gulf War and the 1990s ===
The wing saw action again as part of I Marine Expeditionary Force (I MEF), conducting operations in Iraq and Kuwait during Operation Desert Storm. It deployed over 40 squadrons of aircraft, flew over 18,000 sorties while operating from 6 airfields throughout the theater. After the end of hostilities, 3rd MAW aircraft provided support in Operation Provide Comfort and Operation Southern Watch over Iraq. The wing was once more called into service in Somalia for Operation Restore Hope. In 1999, 3rd MAW relocated to Marine Corps Air Station Miramar, California.

=== Global war on terror ===
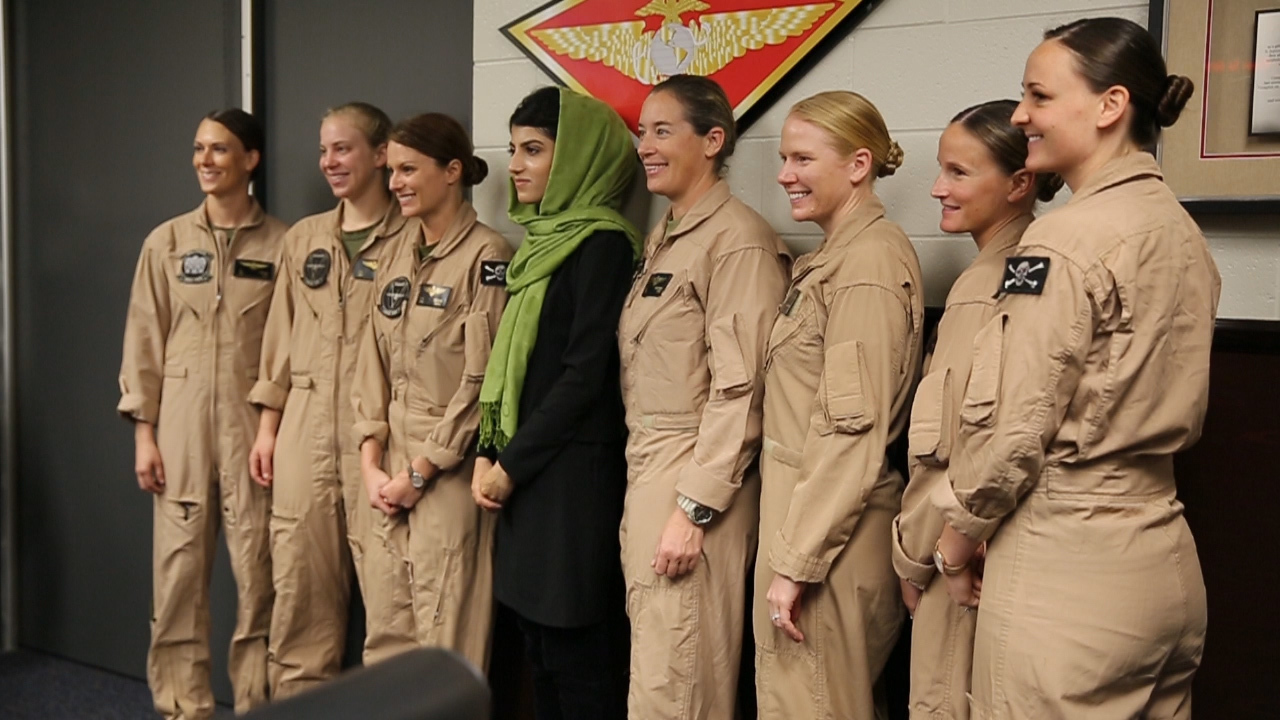
Female pilots with Afghan Capt. Niloofar Rahmani, the first female fixed-wing pilot in the Afghan Air Force, March 2015

The fall of 2001 saw the beginning of the war on terrorism, and 3rd MAW since deployed several detachments in support of the ongoing Operation Enduring Freedom in Afghanistan.

In the fall of 2002, the wing began deploying to Kuwait to prepare for combat operations in Iraq. Ultimately the wing moved 435 aircraft and 15,451 personnel to Southwest Asia prior to the attack marking the first time the entire wing had deployed since the Gulf War and the largest since the Vietnam War. Their two primary bases in Kuwait were Ali Al Salem Air Base and Ahmad al-Jaber Air Base while Wing ground units also established 15 Forward Operating Bases (FOBs) or Forward Arming and Refueling Points (FARPs) during march north. During the invasion, 3rd MAW expended over 6 million pounds of ordnance, including over 2,300 general-purpose bombs and 2,200 precision guided munitions.

=== Present ===
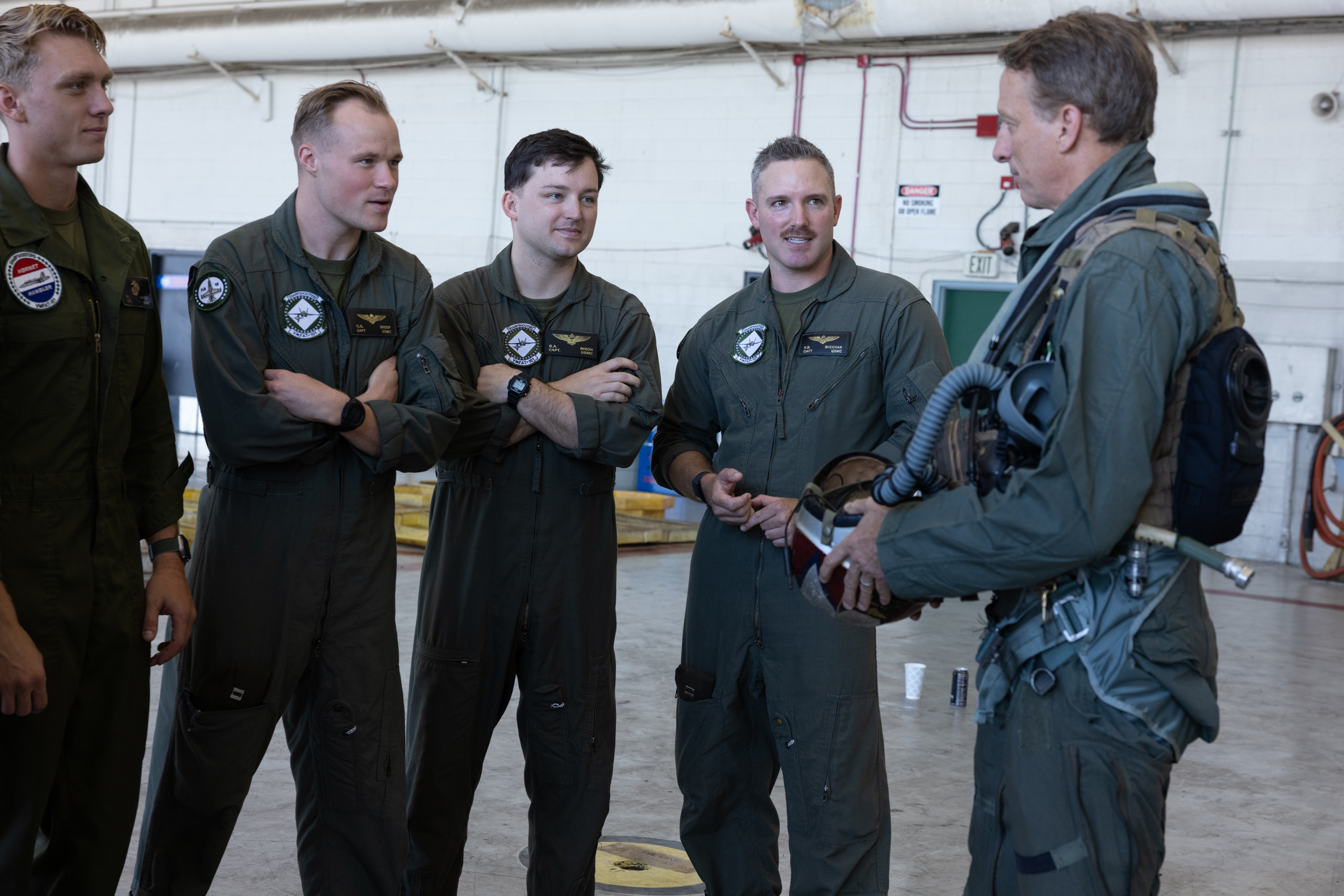
Members of VMFAT-101, the Marine Corps' F/A-18 Hornet training squadron at MCAS Miramar in August 2023

In April 2025, the 3rd Marine Aircraft Wing will participate the 2025 Balikatan Military Exercise, which marks the 40 year anniversary of joint military drills between the US and the Philippines.

==== Helicopter training crashes ====
On 6 February 2024, a CH-53E Super Stallion helicopter crashed while returning to Marine Corps Air Station Miramar base, killing all five Marines onboard. In August 2025, another CH-53E Super Stallion helicopter caught fire while grounded at Marine Corps Air Ground Combat Center Twentynine Palms, where all Marines onboard were evacuated without injury.

On 16 October 2025, during a routine training exercise by HMLA-369 on a AH-1Z Viper in Southern California, one Marine pilot was killed and another injured after their helicopter crashed in an "aviation mishap". According to a report released the following day by Maj. Gen. James B. Wellons, commander of the 3rd Marine Aircraft Wing those involved were part of, the Marine pilots crashed at approximately 7:05pm in a remote part of the Southern California desert near the sparsely populated community of Imperial Gables. The Marines were undergoing standard training as part of the seven-week Marine Corps Weapons and Tactics Instructor Course 1-26, which was to conclude ten days later. One of the pilots was brought to Pioneers Memorial Hospital in the city of Brawley by emergency personnel, where he was pronounced dead, and the other to Desert Regional Medical Center in the city of Palm Springs, where he was confirmed to be in stable condition. An investigation into the specific cause of the crash was immediately started, which could take up to several months before findings released to the public. The American weekly news magazine Newsweek commented the crash mattered as it highlights persistent safety concerns of military aviators in the US, even during peace time.

== Current aircraft in use ==
Fixed-wing aircraft

- F/A-18 Hornet
- F-35C Lightning II
- F-35B Lightning II
- KC-130J Super Hercules

Rotary-wing aircraft

- AH-1W SuperCobra
- AH-1Z Viper
- UH-1Y Venom
- CH-53E Super Stallion

Tiltrotor aircraft

- MV-22B Osprey

UAVs

- RQ-7 Shadow
- Scan Eagle

== See also ==
- List of United States Marine Corps aircraft groups
- List of United States Marine Corps aircraft squadrons
- United States Marine Corps Aviation
