= VMM-164 =

Marine Medium Tiltrotor Squadron 164
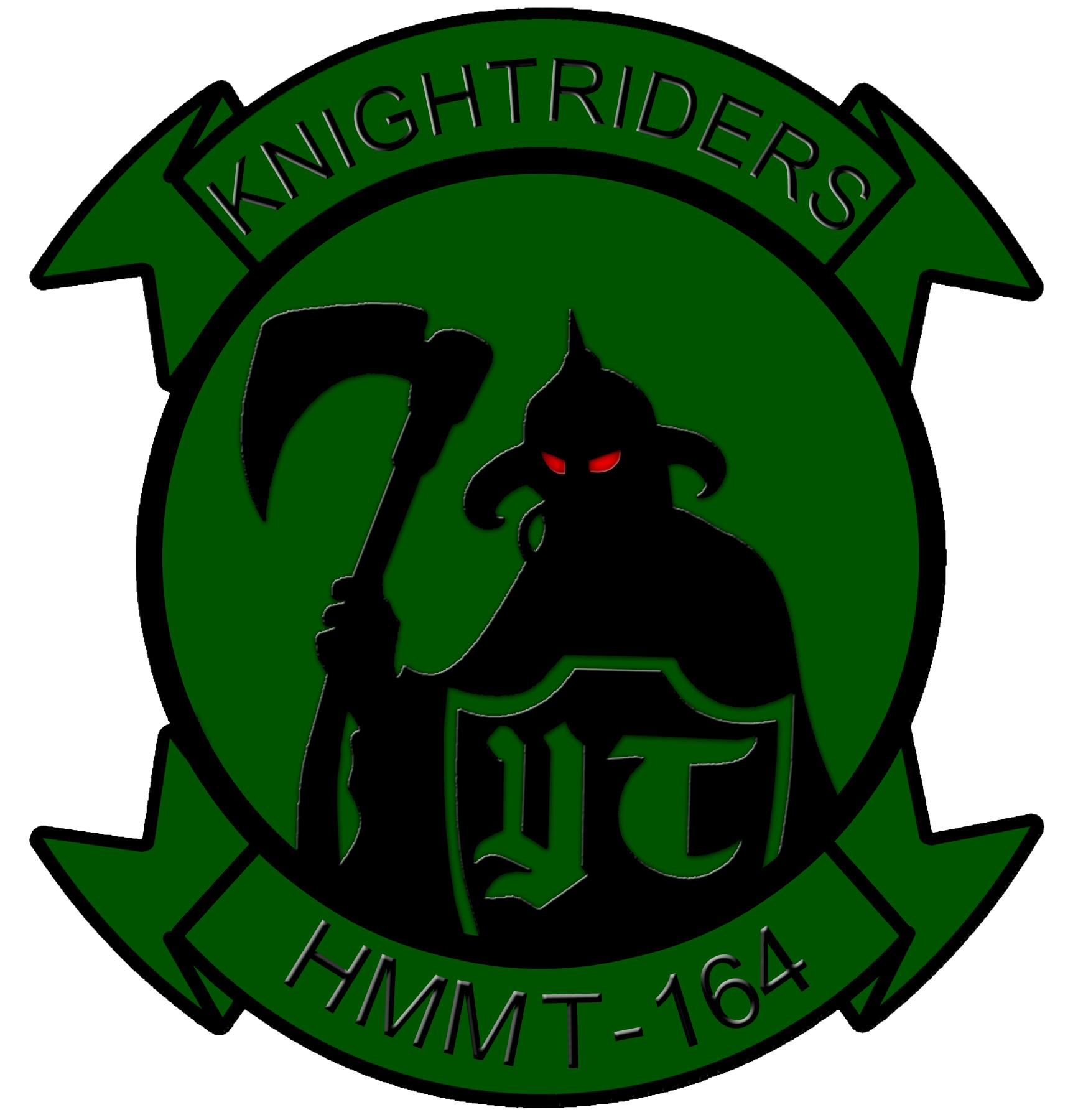
- Old HMMT-164 unit insignia
- Active: 1 July 1964–present
- Country: United States
- Branch: United States Marine Corps
- Type: Medium-lift Tiltrotor Squadron
- Role: Assault support
- Part of: Marine Aircraft Group 39; 3rd Marine Aircraft Wing
- Garrison/HQ: Marine Corps Air Station Camp Pendleton
- Nicknames: "Knightriders" "Flying Death" (Vietnam)
- Motto: "Against all odds"
- Tail Code: YT
- Engagements: Vietnam War; *Operation Eagle Pull; *Operation Frequent Wind; Operation Desert Storm; Operation Restore Hope; *Operation Inherent Resolve

Commanders
- Commanding Officer: LtCol Seth M. Grant
- Executive Officer: Maj Paul Estes

Aircraft flown
- Cargo helicopter: CH-46 Sea Knight (1965–2015); MV-22B Osprey (2015–Present)

Marine Medium Tiltrotor Squadron 164 (VMM-164), is a United States Marine Corps tiltrotor squadron operating the MV-22B Osprey. Known as the Knightriders, they fall under the command Marine Aircraft Group 39 (MAG-39) and the 3rd Marine Aircraft Wing (3rd MAW). They are based at Marine Corps Air Station Camp Pendleton.

== History ==
Marine Medium Helicopter Squadron 164 (HMM-164) was activated under LtCol. Herbert J. Blaha on 1 July 1964 at Marine Corps Air Station Santa Ana, California as part of Marine Aircraft Group 36 (MAG-36) operating UH-34s. In August 1965 the squadron transferred to Marine Wing Support Group 37 at Marine Corps Air Station El Toro, California. The squadron received the first CH-46A Sea Knights assigned to West Coast squadrons. The squadron had to address various technical teething problems including excessive rotor vibration and sand damage to the engines. In addition as a result of combat experience in South Vietnam the helicopters had to be modified to mount machine guns on either side of the helicopter.

=== Vietnam War ===
On 16 February 1966 the squadron was loaded aboard USS Princeton for transport to U.S. Naval Base Subic Bay. Arriving at Subic Bay on 4 March they were transferred to the USS Valley Forge. On 8 March the squadron flew ashore to Marble Mountain Air Facility near Da Nang, South Vietnam joining Marine Aircraft Group 16 (MAG-16) and becoming the first CH-46 squadron to join the war. Despite the earlier modifications the CH-46A experienced problems with sand damaging the engine compressors with the result that engines had to be replaced every 200-300 sorties, however by the end of August filters had been installed which remedied the issue. In late March the squadron supported Operation Kings. On 23 June the squadron supported Operation Turner to destroy munitions left at the A Shau Special Forces Camp after the camp was abandoned at the end of the Battle of A Sau. During Operation Hastings on 15 July at LZ Crow (16.861°N 106.909°E) two squadron CH-46s collided and crashed, while a third CH-46 from HMM-265 hit a tree and crashed. As a result of these collisions, two Marines were killed and seven injured and all three helicopters were too badly damaged for recovery and had to be destroyed. Later that day another CH-46 from HMM-265 was hit by People's Army of Vietnam fire and crashed, killing 13 Marines. Marines promptly renamed the area as "Helicopter Valley". From 4 July the squadron supported Operation Macon.

On 3 April 1967 the squadron became the Special Landing Force (SLF) helicopter squadron. In late April the squadron supported The Hill Fights around Khe Sanh Combat Base. In later April the squadron supported Operation Beacon Star. From 20 May the squadron supported Operation Hickory. In early July the squadron supported Operation Buffalo. On 13 July the squadron returned ashore to Phu Bai Combat Base. On 16 October the squadron was assigned to MAG-36.

On 3 March 1968 the squadron was assigned to SLF Bravo on USS Valley Forge. On 16 June the squadron returned ashore. In late August the squadron supported Operation Sussex Bay. On 29 December the squadron was again assigned to SLF Bravo on USS Tripoli.

In January 1969 the squadron supported Operation Bold Mariner. On 20 October the squadron left South Vietnam and relocated to Okinawa. In early November the squadron embarked on board Amphibious Ready Group Bravo, alternating maintenance and training at Subic Bay and periods at sea along the littoral of South Vietnam, from the Cà Mau Peninsula to the Vietnamese Demilitarized Zone.

In May 1971 the squadron was part of 31st Marine Amphibious Unit (31st MAU) on Amphibious Ready Group Alpha on USS New Orleans.

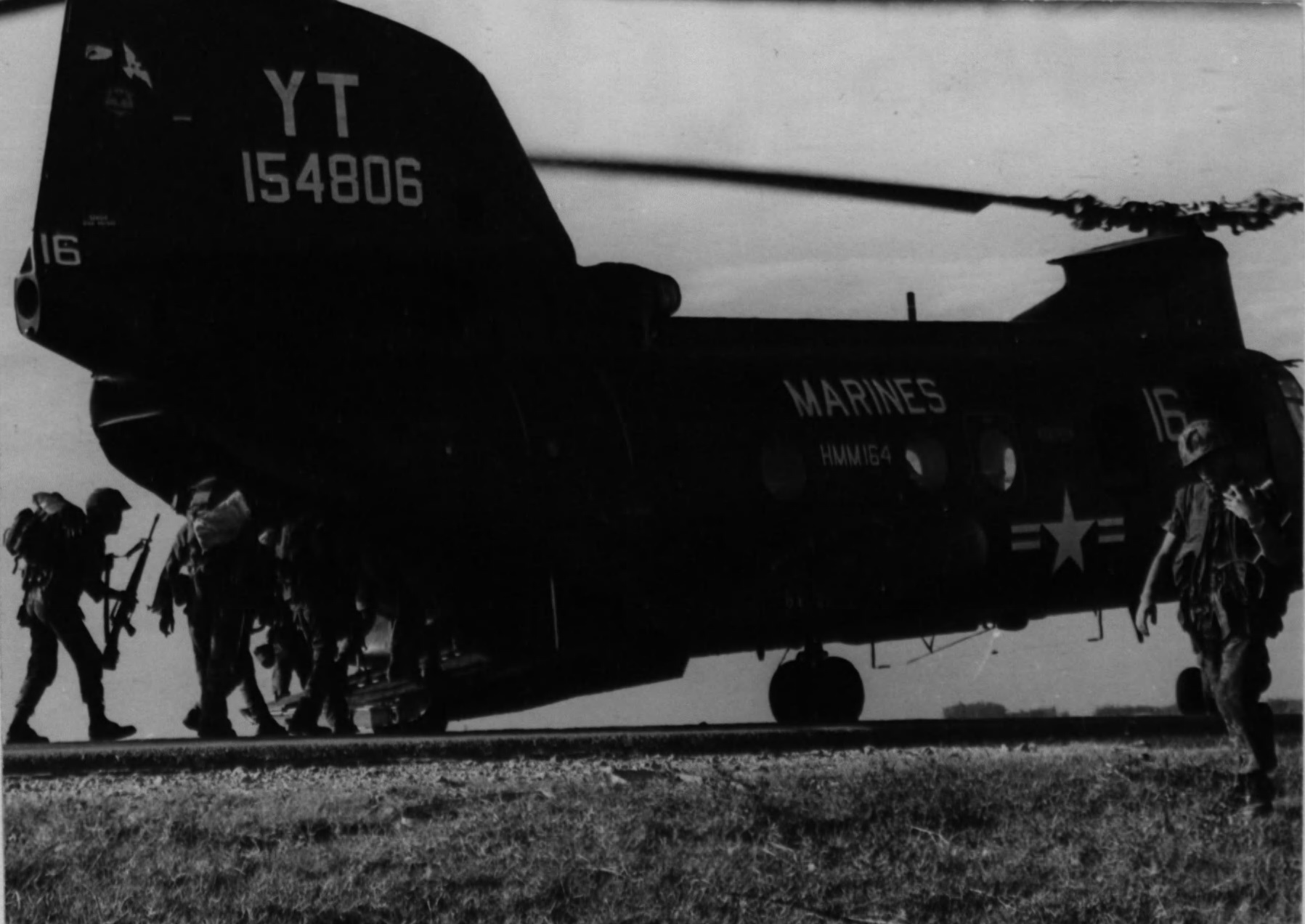
South Vietnamese Marines load aboard an HMM-164 CH-46D to join Operation Lam Son 72

On 11 April 1972 the squadron was reassigned to 33rd Marine Amphibious Unit (33rd MAU). On 12 and 23 May the squadron operating from USS Okinawa transported South Vietnamese Marines in a series of raids known as Operation Song Than 5-72 and Operation Song Than 6-72 in defense of Battle of the Mỹ Chánh Line. In late June the squadron again transported South Vietnamese forces in support of Operation Lam Son 72.

Throughout 1974 and into early 1975 squadron units were always assigned as a component of the 31st MAU on board Amphibious Ready Group Alpha ships. The assigned unit actually was a composite squadron, usually augmented by detachments of CH-53D Sea Stallions from HMH-462; UH-1Es of HML-367 and AH-1J SeaCobras of HMA-369. On 20 June 1974 the squadron replaced HMH-462 on USS New Orleans at Okinawa and departed for Subic Bay arriving there on 22 June.

In early April 1975 14 squadron CH-46Ds, HML-367(Reinforced) with 11 UH-1Es, HMA-369 (Reinforced) with 4 AH-1Js and H&MS-36 were embarked on USS Midway in preparation for the Operation Eagle Pull the evacuation of U.S. civilians from Phnom Penh, Cambodia. On 10 April Midway arrived at U.S. Naval Base Subic Bay and the group's helicopters were transferred to the USS Hancock. The Hancock did not join Task Group 76.4 awaiting the Cambodian evacuation, but instead joined Task Force 76 waiting off the coast of South Vietnam for the evacuation of U.S. civilians and "at-risk" South Vietnamese. During Operation Frequent Wind, the evacuation of Saigon, the composite squadron flew air support and Sparrowhawk rescue and air cover in addition to participating in the evacuation. At 07:53 on 30 April a squadron CH-46D Swift 2-2 evacuated the last Marine Security Guards from the roof of the U.S. Embassy.

=== Post-Vietnam ===
With the advent of the Unit Deployment Program, on 1 September 1978, HMM-164 returned home to MCAS Santa Ana, California. In September 1978, the squadron rejoined MAG-36 at MCAS(H) Futenma for a six-month tour beginning in August 1979 and returning to MCAS(H) Tustin in February 1980. On 1 November 1980, HMM-164 became the first unit on the West Coast to receive the "E" model CH-46. By March 1981, the squadron had received its full complement of "Echo" helicopters. On July 16, 1982, HMM-164 was recognized by Boeing Vertol for being the first CH-46 squadron to reach 100,000 hours of cumulative flight hours. During the summer of 1989, the squadron simultaneously supported oil spill cleanup efforts in Valdez, Alaska and an Air Contingency Force at Soto Cano Air Base, Honduras.

In June 1990, HMM-164 deployed to the Western Pacific with the 13th Marine Expeditionary Unit (13th MEU) and provided support relief efforts following the July earthquake that devastated the Philippines. In August 1990 the squadron proceeded to Southwest Asia and participated in maritime interdiction operations during Operation Desert Shield and then provided combat support during Operation Desert Storm before returning to MCAS Tustin in April 1991. On October 8, 1990, two Bell UH-1N Twin Hueys operated by the United States Marine Corps assigned to Marine Medium Helicopter Squadron 164 (HMM-164), collided during a night training mission over the Gulf of Oman, off the coast of Oman. Both helicopters were operating from the amphibious assault ship USS Okinawa. The collision resulted in the loss of all eight marines aboard both aircraft. Despite extensive search and recovery efforts, no survivors were recovered.

The squadron deployed in October 1992 with the 15th Marine Expeditionary Unit (15th MEU). The squadron provided support to Joint Task Force (Somalia) during Operation Restore Hope from December 1992 until February 1993. HMM-164 returned to MCAS Tustin in April 1993. August 1993 found the squadron providing support for units training at the Mountain Warfare Training Center, Bridgeport, California and provided a mission capabilities demonstration for the Secretary of the Navy. In August 1993, the Marine Corps Aviation Association chose HMM-164 as the Medium Helicopter Squadron of the year.

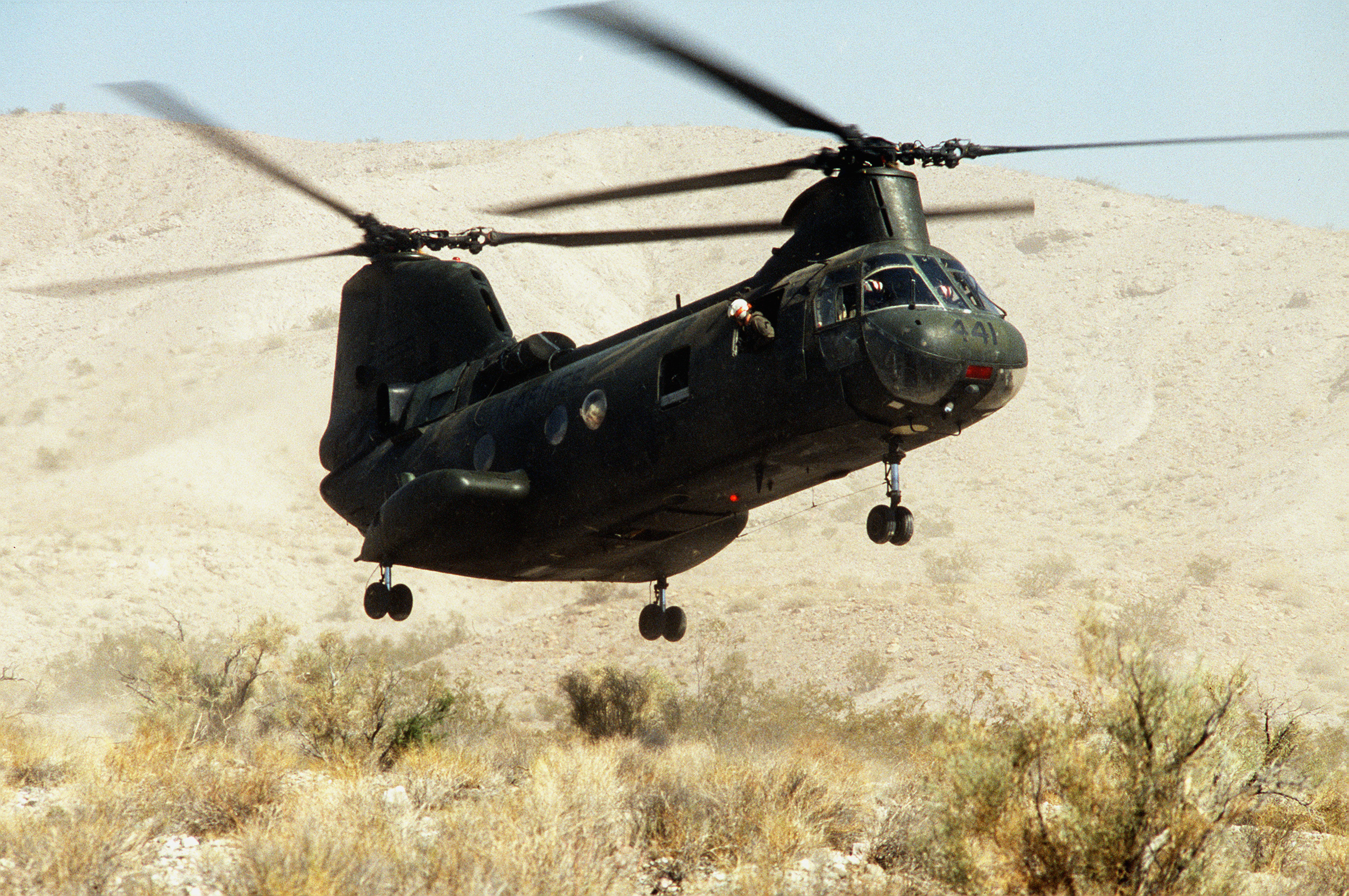
A CH-46 Sea Knight from HMM-164 during a training exercise in California in 1986.

In June 1995, HMM-164 deployed as the Aviation Combat Element with the 11th Marine Expeditionary Unit (11th MEU). During this time it provided support for the United States Central Command in Operation Vigilant Sentinel in Kuwait as well as Bahrain, Qatar, and United Arab Emirates before returning and relocating to MCAS El Toro, California in December 1995.

In February 1996, HMM-164 was called upon to support the President of the United States as he visited the flood-ravaged areas around Portland, Oregon.

On 28 August 1997, HMM-164 (REIN) deployed again with the 13th Marine Expeditionary Unit. During December 1997 and January 1998, the squadron's AV-8B Harrier IIs and KC-130 Hercules flew combat sorties in support of Operation Southern Watch over southern Iraq. HMM-164 (REIN) returned to MCAS El Toro on February 26, 1998, completing its final deployment before re-designation as a Fleet Replacement Squadron.

On 8 January 1999, HMM-164 relocated to MCAS Camp Pendleton, California as part of the Base Realignment and Closure (BRAC) move and was attached to MAG-39 effective 11 January. In February 1999, the Squadron was re-designated HMMT-164 and was tasked to become the Marine Corps’ Fleet Replacement Squadron for the CH-46E.

During March 1999, the squadron deployed two aircraft to Moffett Federal Airfield to support Operation Urban Warrior and accept its first two student pilots. In May, the Marine Enlisted Aircrew Training Department accepted its first class of new enlisted aircrew. On 1 June 1999, the squadron took over the role as Model Manager and Fleet Project Team Manager for the CH-46E. Since 2000, HMMT-164 has trained over 360 new pilots and 460 crew chiefs.

On 28 June 2008, HMMT-164 deployed to Naval Air Station Lemoore after California Governor Arnold Schwarzenegger requested military assistance to fight raging wildfires. The helicopters are providing medium lift rotary wing support to United States Northern Command and the National Fire Center.

On 9 April 2015, HMMT-164 officially retired the CH-46E and transitioned to the MV-22B Osprey. As part of the transition, they became a fleet squadron rather than a training squadron and so were redesignated as VMM-164.

=== Global War On Terror ===
In the spring of 2018, VMM-164 deployed for the first time as an MV-22B Osprey squadron in support of Operation Inherent Resolve. They serve as one of the main means of transportation of VIPs, troops and cargo in the Area of Operations.

== See also ==
- United States Marine Corps Aviation
- List of active United States Marine Corps aircraft squadrons
- List of decommissioned United States Marine Corps aircraft squadrons
- Death Dealer - the Frank Frazetta painting that is the origin of the units mascot.
