= Marine Corps Air Station Camp Pendleton =

US military installation in California

- Munn Field
- Part of Marine Corps Base Camp Pendleton
- Near Oceanside, California in United States
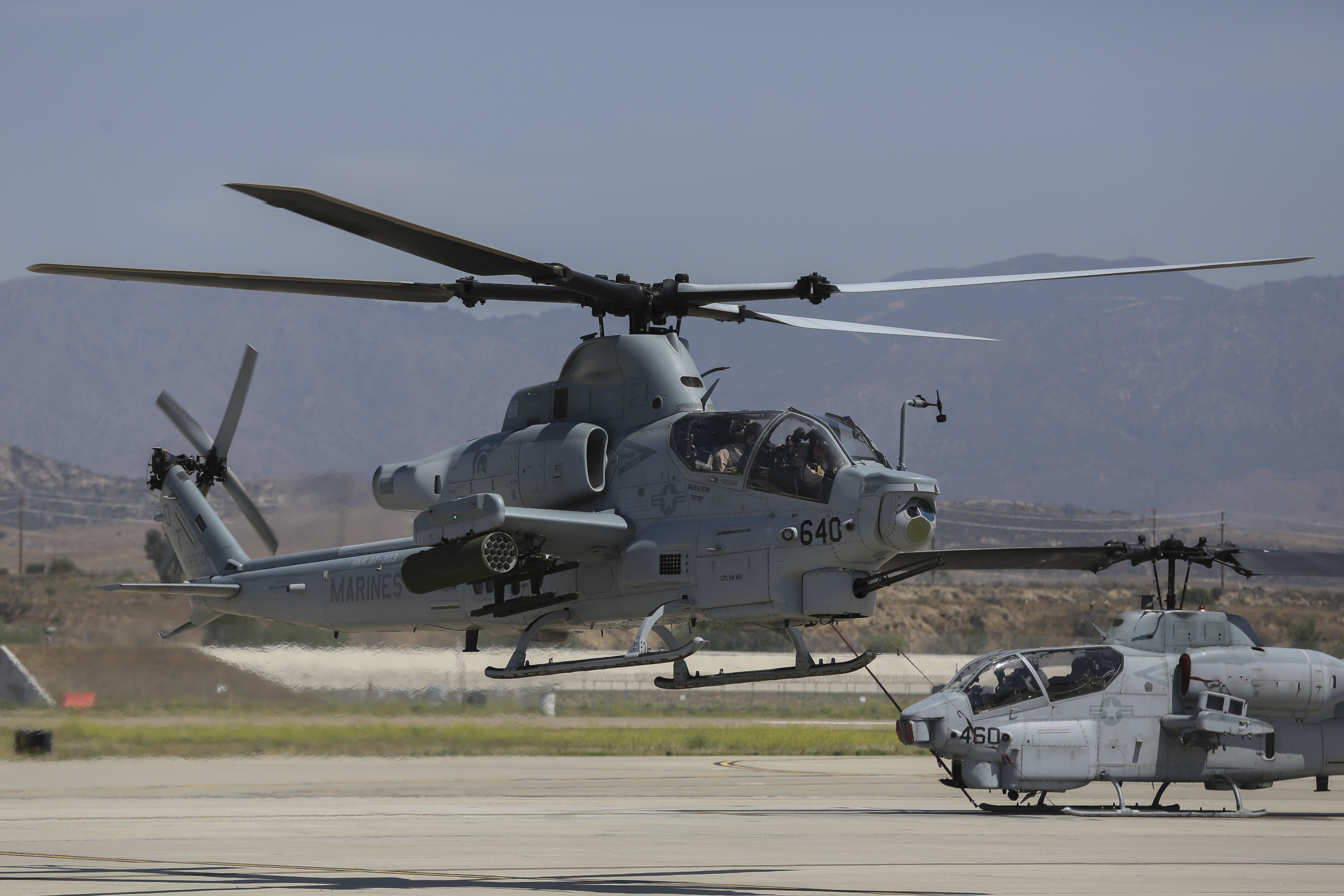
- A U.S. Marine Corps AH-1Z Viper light attack helicopter taking off from MCAS Camp Pendleton in 2016

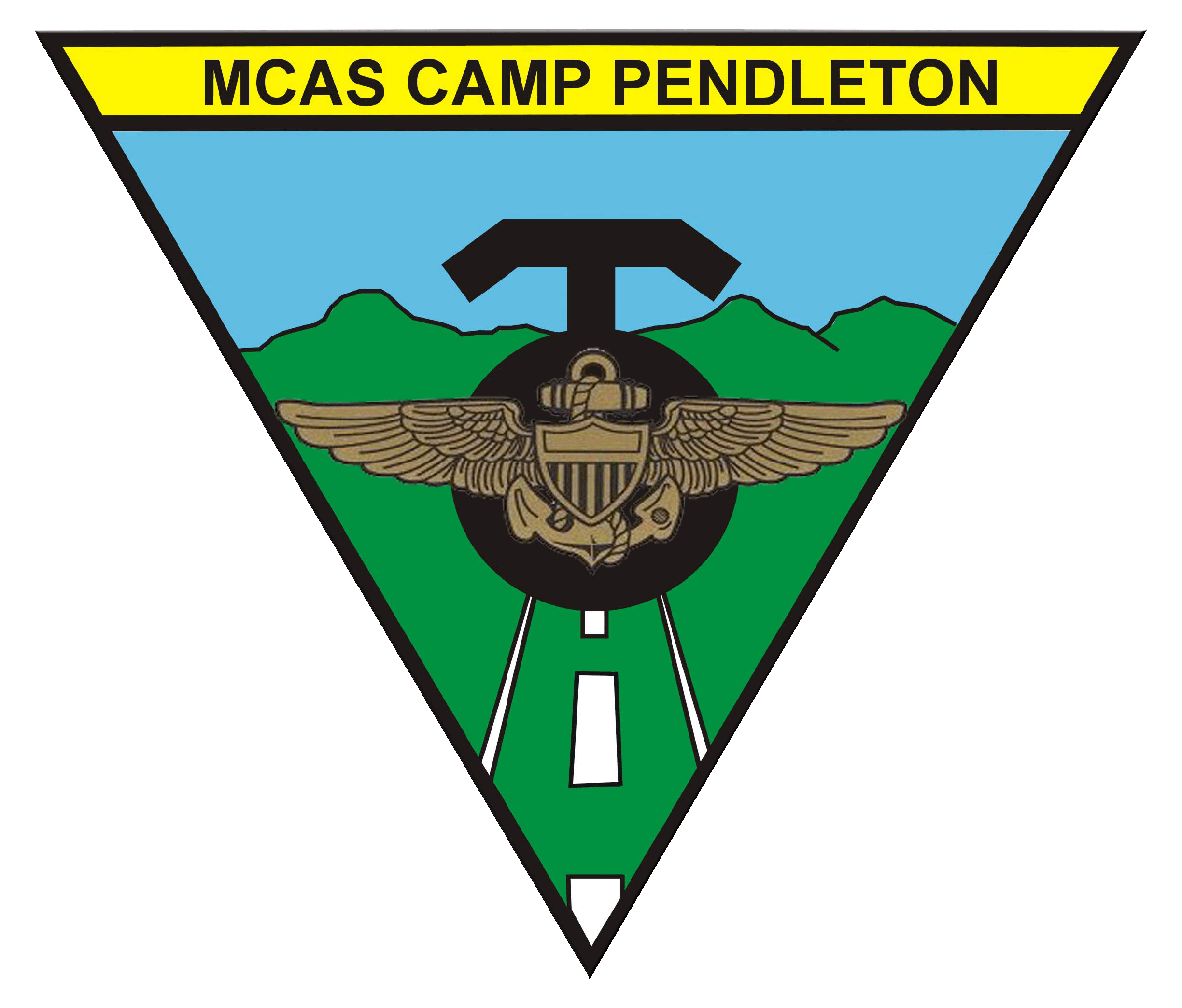

Site information
- Type: Marine Corps air station
- Owner: Department of Defense
- Operator: United States Marine Corps
- Controlled by: 3rd Marine Aircraft Wing
- Condition: Operational
- Website: www.mcaspendleton.marines.mil

Location
- Location in the United States
- Coordinates: 33°18′04″N 117°21′19″W

Site history
- Built: 1942
- In use: 1942 – present

Garrison information
- Current commander: Colonel Christine M. Houser
- Garrison: Marine Aircraft Group 39

Airfield information
- Identifiers: ICAO: KNFG, FAA LID: NFG, WMO: 722926
- Elevation: 23.7 metres (78 ft) AMSL
Runways
Direction	Length and surface
03/21	1,830.6 metres (6,006 ft) asphalt
Helipads
Number	Length and surface
E2	40.5 metres (133 ft) asphalt
F2	40.5 metres (133 ft) asphalt
P1	41.7 metres (137 ft) asphalt
P2	41.7 metres (137 ft) asphalt
P3	41.7 metres (137 ft) asphalt
P4	41.7 metres (137 ft) asphalt
- Other airfield facilities: Helicopter rinse facility

Marine Corps Air Station Camp Pendleton or MCAS Camp Pendleton (ICAO: KNFG, FAA LID: NFG) is a United States Marine Corps airfield located within Marine Corps Base Camp Pendleton. It was commissioned in 1942 and is currently home to Marine Aircraft Group 39. The airfield is also known as Munn Field in honor of Lieutenant General John C. "Toby" Munn, the first Marine aviator to serve as the Commanding General of Marine Corps Base Camp Pendleton.

== History ==
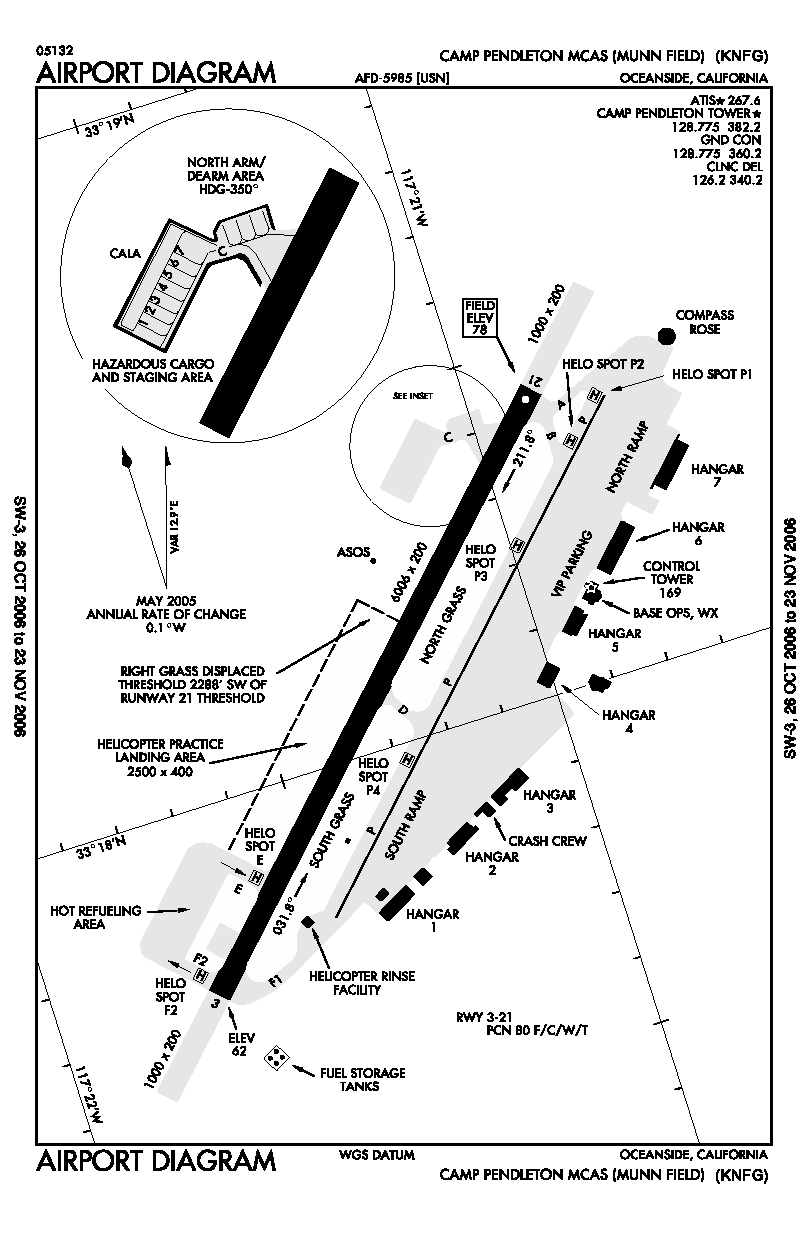
FAA airport diagram

On 25 September 1942, the area presently known as Marine Corps Air Station, Camp Pendleton, California, was designated an auxiliary landing field and served as a sub-unit of Marine Corps Air Station El Toro. The airstrip was 6,000 ft by 400 ft and began operating in November 1942. In February 1944, it became an Outlying Field (OLF) to Marine Corps Auxiliary Field Gillespie and it was during this time that the first squadrons were actually assigned to the field. Among the first squadrons were VMO-5, VMF-323 and VMF-471. In September 1944, the field was designated as a permanent establishment. In 1945, due to overcrowding at Marine Corps Air Station El Centro, Marine Aircraft Group 35 began parking its spare transport planes at the field as well.

During the early 1950s, the airfield was used in filming The Flying Leathernecks starring John Wayne.

Marine Observation Squadron FIVE (VMO-5), a composite squadron consisting of both OV-10 Bronco fixed-wing aircraft and UH-1 Huey helicopters, was established in 1966 and was the first squadron stationed at the airfield following World War II.

Through the years, aviation began to play an increasing role in Marine Corps tactics, creating a need for modern facilities. To meet this need, the auxiliary landing field was re-designated a Marine Corps Air Facility (MCAF) on 1 September 1978 serving as home to Marine Aircraft Group 39 (MAG-39). Since 1978, the Group expanded to a strength of four tactical helicopter squadrons, one helicopter training squadron, one observation squadron, and an aviation logistics squadron. This increase in aircraft and personnel established once again the need for improved facilities.

On 13 March 1985, MCAF Pendleton was re-designated as Marine Corps Air Station effective 1 April 1985. Today, the Air Station supports over 180 helicopters assigned to MAG-39, Marine Aircraft Group 46 Detachment A, and a wide variety of other Marine Corps units and visiting aircraft from other branches of the Armed Forces. The closure of MCAS Tustin and MCAS El Toro were a result of Base Realignment and Closure legislation which saw MCAS Camp Pendleton expand its facilities again to support three additional helicopter squadrons. The first medium lift helicopter squadron joined MAG-39 in January 1999, and the final one came in June of that year.

In July 2020, the station's Headquarters and Headquarters Squadron became a flying unit for the first time when it received a UC-12W Huron. The aircraft is used in the operational support role, allowing high priority passengers and cargo to be flown at a reduced cost compared to using the MV-22B Osprey or UH-1Y Venom.

== Based units ==
Flying and notable non-flying units based at MCAS Camp Pendleton.

=== United States Marine Corps ===
Marine Corps Installations – West

- Headquarters and Headquarters Squadron – UC-12W Huron

3rd Marine Aircraft Wing

- Marine Aircraft Group 39
  - Headquarters Squadron 39 (MAG-39 HQ)
  - Marine Aviation Logistics Squadron 39 (MALS-39)
  - Marine Light Attack Helicopter Squadron 169 (HMLA-169) – AH-1Z Viper and UH-1Y Venom
  - Marine Light Attack Helicopter Squadron 267 (HMLA-267) – AH-1Z Viper and UH-1Y Venom
  - Marine Light Attack Helicopter Training Squadron 303 (HMLAT-303) – AH-1Z Viper and UH-1Y Venom
  - Marine Light Attack Helicopter Squadron 369 (HMLA-369) – AH-1Z Viper and UH-1Y Venom
  - Marine Light Attack Helicopter Squadron 367 (HMLA-367) - AH-1Z Viper and UH-1Y Venom
  - Marine Light Attack Helicopter Squadron 469 (HMLA-469) – AH-1Z Viper and UH-1Y Venom
  - Marine Light Attack Helicopter Squadron 775 (HMLA-775) – AH-1W Super Cobra, AH-1Z Viper and UH-1Y Venom
  - Marine Medium Tilt-rotor Squadron 164 (VMM-164) – MV-22B Osprey
  - Marine Medium Tilt-rotor Squadron 364 (VMM-364) – MV-22B Osprey
- Marine Aircraft Group 41
  - Marine Unmanned Aerial Vehicle Squadron 4 (VMU-4) – RQ-21 Blackjack

== See also ==
- List of airports in California
- List of United States Marine Corps installations
- United States Marine Corps Aviation
