= HMLA-469 =

Marine Light Attack Helicopter Squadron 469
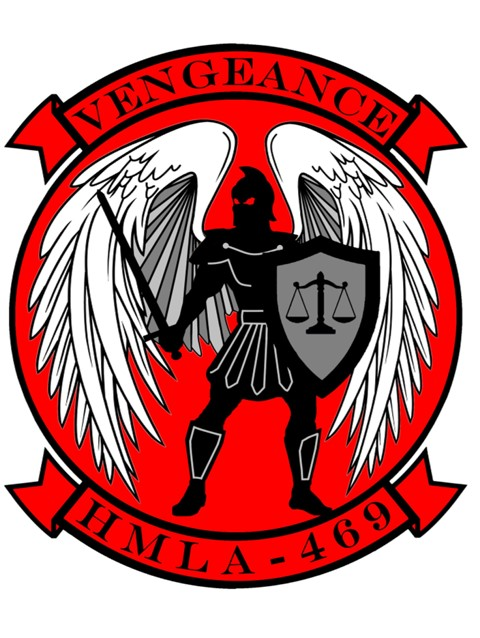
- HMLA-469's insignia
- Active: 30 June 2009–16 December 2022
- Country: United States
- Branch: Marine Corps
- Type: Light attack squadron
- Role: Close air support; Utility air support
- Size: c. 350 Marines
- Part of: N/A
- Garrison/HQ: Marine Corps Air Station Camp Pendleton
- Nickname: "Vengeance"
- Motto: Attack with vengeance!
- Tail Code: SE
- Engagements: US War in Afghanistan; Camp Bastion attack
- Website: Official website

Commanders
- Current commander: LtCol Greg "Yeti" Watten

Aircraft flown
- Attack helicopter: AH-1 SuperCobra; AH-1Z Viper
- Utility helicopter: UH-1Y Venom

Marine Light Attack Helicopter Squadron 469 (HMLA-469) was a United States Marine Corps helicopter squadron consisting of AH-1 SuperCobra and AH-1Z Viper attack helicopters and UH-1Y Venom utility helicopters. The squadron was last headquartered at Marine Corps Air Station Camp Pendleton in Southern California and fell under the command of Marine Aircraft Group 39 (MAG-39) and the 3rd Marine Aircraft Wing (3rd MAW). The squadron was commissioned on 30 June 2009 and decommissioned on 16 December 2022.

== Mission ==
The mission of the HMLA is to support the Marine Air-Ground Task Force Commander by providing offensive air support, utility support, armed escort and airborne supporting arms coordination, day or night under all weather conditions during expeditionary, joint or combined operations.

== History ==
On 29 October 2009 a US Coast Guard HC-130 aircraft with seven crewmembers collided with an HMLA-469 AH-1 Cobra helicopter with two crewmembers 15 mi (24 km) east of San Clemente Island. Both aircraft crashed into the Pacific Ocean and all nine crewmembers in both aircraft were killed. The Coast Guard's HC-130 was searching for a missing boater while the Marine Corps' helicopter was heading towards a military training area in company with another Cobra and two CH-53E Super Stallions from Marine Corps Air Station Miramar.

== See also ==
- United States Marine Corps Aviation
- List of active United States Marine Corps aircraft squadrons
