= HMLAT-303 =

Marine Light Attack Helicopter Training Squadron 303
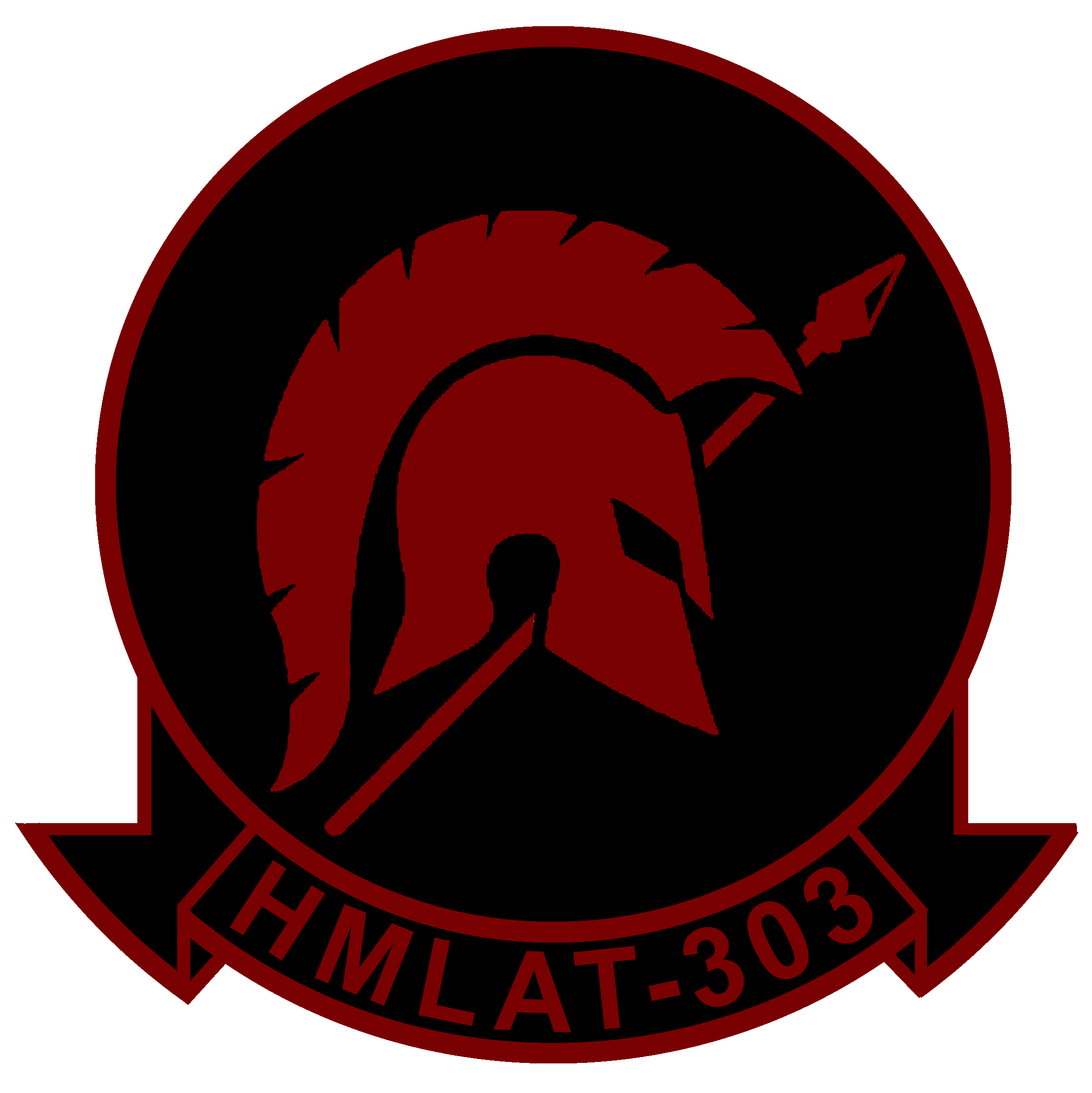
- HMLAT-303 Insignia
- Active: 30 April 1982 - Present
- Country: United States
- Branch: United States Marine Corps
- Type: Fleet Replacement Squadron
- Role: Assault support
- Part of: Marine Aircraft Group 39; 3rd Marine Aircraft Wing
- Garrison/HQ: Marine Corps Air Station Camp Pendleton
- Nickname: "Atlas"
- Motto: "Training The Future of Light Attack"
- Tail Code: QT
- Engagements: None

Commanders
- Current commander: LtCol Robert "Twilight" Johnson III

Marine Light Attack Helicopter Training Squadron 303 (HMLAT-303), is a United States Marine Corps helicopter training squadron stationed at Marine Corps Air Station Camp Pendleton, California. Known as "Atlas", HMLAT-303 trains newly commissioned Naval Aviators, conversion pilots, and refresher pilots to fly the Bell UH-1Y Venom and Bell AH-1Z Viper. HMLAT-303 is also responsible for training Bell UH-1Y Venom crew chiefs. It is part of Marine Aircraft Group 39 (MAG-39) and the 3rd Marine Aircraft Wing (3rd MAW).

== Mission ==
The Mission of Marine Helicopter Light Attack Training Squadron 303 is to provide qualitative and productive training to Replacement Aircrew (RAC), Refresher, Transition and Conversion pilots, as well as Bell UH-1Y Venom crew chiefs. This training is provided in the newly upgraded AH-1Z and UH-1Y helicopters.

RAC students entering the training syllabus are newly designated Naval Aviators from the Naval Air Training Command in Pensacola, Florida. Refresher students are Fleet Marine Force Aviators returning from shore duty billets or military schools. Transition students are Fleet Marine Force Aviators qualified in other aircraft. Crew Chiefs are enlisted personnel who will act as aerial observers and gunners aboard the UH-1Y.

This command also instructs refreshers and RACs through intraservice and international exchange programs.

== History ==
Marine Light Attack Helicopter Training Squadron 303 (HMLAT-303) was activated with four officers and three enlisted Marines on 30 April 1982. Today the squadron has grown to over 400 Marines and 45 aircraft. Based at Marine Corps Air Station Camp Pendleton, California, HMLAT-303 conducts an extensive training syllabus to include: familiarization, navigation, ordnance, terrain, formation, instrument and night vision goggle flight. The squadron periodically deploys to Marine Corps Air Station Yuma, Arizona, where training efficiency is enhanced due to the proximity of ordnance delivery ranges and superb weather conditions.

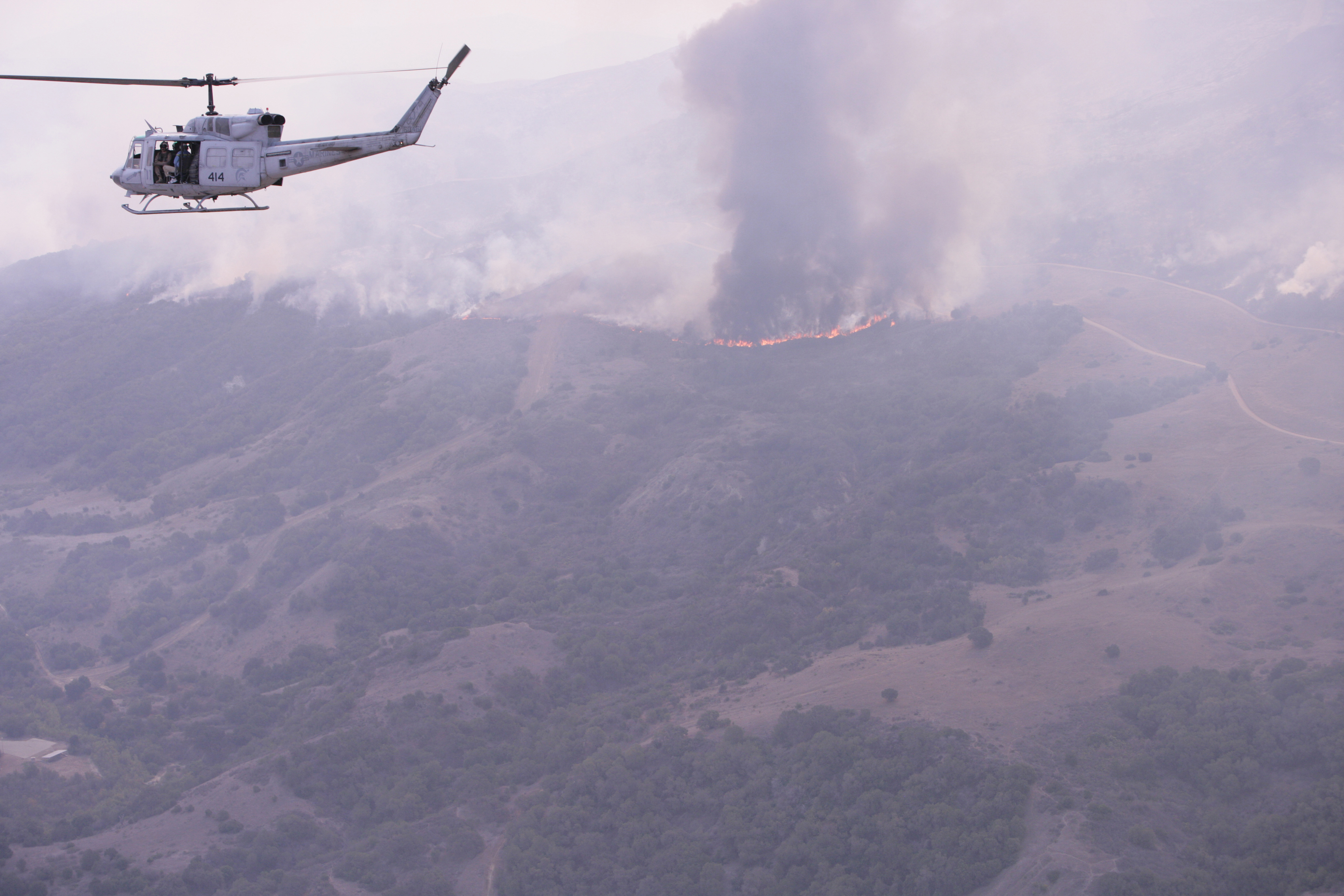
A UH-1N from HMLAT-303 flies California Representative Bill Brady during the October 2007 California wildfires.

HMLAT-303 trained AH-1W Cobra and UH-1N Huey pilots for the Marine Corps and Navy for more than 20 years, until both platforms were upgraded to the new AH-1Z Viper and UH-1Y Venom. HMLAT-303 is the only Marine Corps squadron tasked with training UH-1Y and AH-1Z replacement, refresher, and conversion pilots and aircrew.

In addition to flight training, HMLAT-303 manages the fleet-wide NATOPS standardization program for the H-1, conducts Instrument Ground School for all of MAG-39 aircrew, and is responsible for the scheduling of the AH-1Z and the UH-1Y Weapons System Trainers and the AH Aircrew Procedures Trainer.

== Unit awards ==
A unit citation or commendation is an award bestowed upon an organization for the action cited. Members of the unit who participated in said actions are allowed to wear on their uniforms the awarded unit citation. HMLAT-303 has been presented with the following awards:

Ribbon	Unit Award
	Navy Unit Commendation with one Bronze Star
	Meritorious Unit Commendation with four Bronze Stars
	National Defense Service Medal with one Bronze Star
	Global War on Terrorism Service Medal

== See also ==
- United States Marine Corps Aviation
- List of United States Marine Corps aircraft squadrons
