= Marine Aviation Logistics Squadron 39 =

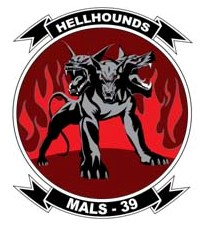
- MALS-39 insignia
- Active: 16 April 1968 – 25 October 1969; 1 September 1978 – present
- Allegiance: United States of America
- Branch: United States Marine Corps
- Type: Logistics
- Role: Aviation logistics support
- Part of: Marine Aircraft Group 39; 3rd Marine Aircraft Wing
- Garrison/HQ: Marine Corps Base Camp Pendleton
- Nickname: Hellhounds
- Engagements: Vietnam War; Operation Iraqi Freedom

Commanders
- Current commander: LtCol Christopher R Seemayer

Marine Aviation Logistics Squadron 39 (MALS-39) is an aviation logistics support unit of the United States Marine Corps. Once known as the "Magicians," they are now known as the "Hellhounds", and they fall under the command of Marine Aircraft Group 39 (MAG-39) and the 3rd Marine Aircraft Wing (3rd MAW) and are currently based at Marine Corps Air Station Camp Pendleton, California.

== Mission ==
Provide aviation logistics support, guidance, planning and direction to Marine Aircraft Group squadrons on behalf of the commanding officer, as well as logistics support for Navy funded equipment in the supporting Marine Wing Support Squadron (MWSS), Marine Air Control Group (MACG), and Marine Aircraft Wing/Mobile Calibration Complex (MAW/MCC).

- Provide intermediate level maintenance for aircraft and aeronautical equipment of all supported units and, when authorized, perform first-degree repair on specific engines.
- Provide aviation supply support for aircraft and Navy-funded equipment to all supported units.
- Provide Class V(a) ammunition logistics support to the MAG's squadrons. This support encompasses the requisitioning, storage, handling, assembly, transportation, and inventory reporting of Class V(a) ammunition. Be capable of planning for, and operating, an airfield ammunition issue point at expeditionary airfields.
- Interpret, implement, audit, inspect, and provide oversight for the MAG, CO, of all policies and procedures relating to the administration and management of operations and maintenance, Navy funds, aviation supply, and aircraft.

== History ==
=== Vietnam War ===
Provisional Headquarters and Maintenance Squadron 39 was activated on 16 April 1968 at Marine Quang Tri Airfield, Republic of Vietnam. Assigned to Provisional Marine Aircraft Group 39 (MAG-39) of the 1st Marine Aircraft Wing, the squadron's mission was to provide logistical support for the tactical squadrons and tactical elements located at Quang Tri, Dong Ha, and Khe Sanh. Provisional Headquarters and Maintenance Squadron 39 was deactivated on 25 October 1969.

=== 1980s and 1990s ===
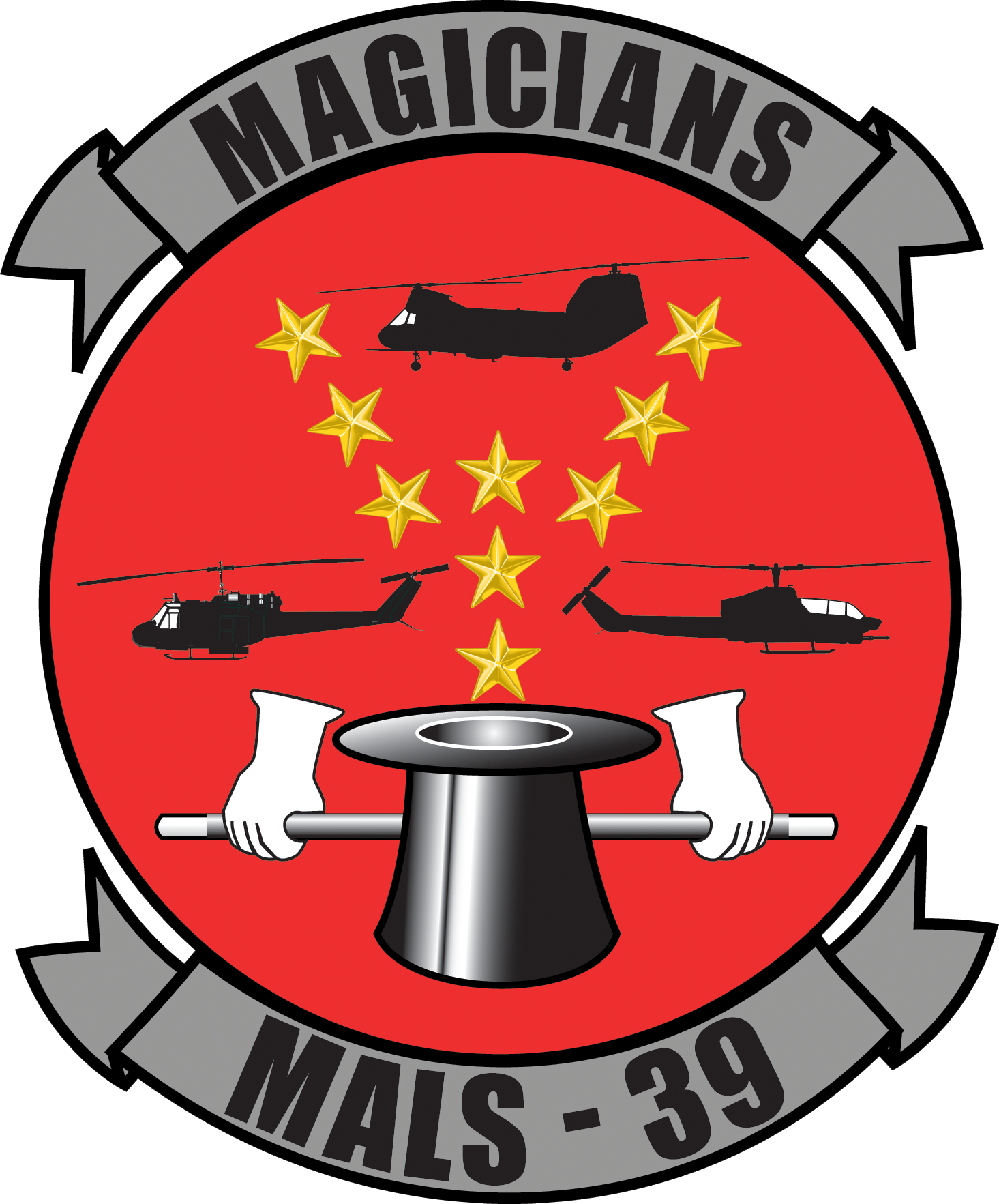
Old MALS-39 insignia.

Headquarters and Maintenance Squadron 39 was reactivated at Camp Pendleton, California on 1 September 1978 to provide support for the UH-1 "Huey", AH-1 "Cobra", and OV-10 "Bronco". The squadron was redesignated on 1 October 1988 as Marine Aviation Logistics Squadron 39 (MALS-39). This changed placed aviation logistics support function firmly under the cognizance of one commanding officer to more efficiently and effectively serve the requirements of supported flying squadrons and Marine Air-ground Task Forces. MALS-39 provides all the aviation supply and intermediated level of aircraft maintenance, avionics, and ordnance support for nine flying squadrons. Additionally, whenever the flying squadrons deploy, whether in the United States or overseas, MALS-39 augments these squadrons with its Marines to ensure optimum aviation logistics support in every clime and place.

Since then, Marines from MALS-39 have seen action throughout the world. Elements of the squadron participated in Operation Desert Storm and in the liberation of Kuwait. Magicians also participated in Operation Restore Hope in Somalia in Africa.

=== War on terror ===
In January 2003, the squadron deployed as a command in support of Operation Enduring Freedom and Operation Iraqi Freedom (OIF) both aboard the SS Curtiss (T-AVB-4) aviation logistics support ship, and ashore at Ali Al Salem Air Base, Kuwait and at various Forward Operating Bases throughout Iraq. In February 2004, Magicians deployed as logistician augments to Marine Aviation Logistics Squadron 16, and as force protection augments to 3rd Low Altitude Air Defense Battalion again in support of OIF. MALS-39 Marines continually deploy to the Western Pacific supporting unit deployments to Okinawa, Japan and Marine Expeditionary Units afloat.

== Awards ==
A unit citation or commendation is an award bestowed upon an organization for the action cited. Members of the unit who participated in said actions are allowed to wear on their uniforms the awarded unit citation. MALS-39 has been presented with the following awards:

Streamer	Award	Year(s)	Additional Info
	Presidential Unit Citation Streamer		
	Navy Unit Commendation Streamer		
	Meritorious Unit Commendation Streamer W/ 1 service star		
	National Defense Service Streamer with two service stars	1967–1968, 1990–1995, 2001–present	Vietnam War, Gulf War, war on terrorism
	Vietnam Service Streamer with one silver star		
	Global War on Terrorism Service Streamer	2001–present	
	Vietnam Gallantry Cross with Palm Streamer		
	Vietnam Meritorious Unit Citation Civil Actions Streamer		

The squadron has also been recognized for its logistics accomplishments, receiving the 1998 Secretary of Defense Maintenance Award (Medium Category) and the 2003 Marine Corps Aviation Association Marine Aviation Logistics Squadron of the Year Award.

== See also ==
- United States Marine Corps Aviation
- Organization of the United States Marine Corps
- List of United States Marine Corps aviation support units
