= Marine Aircraft Group 39 =

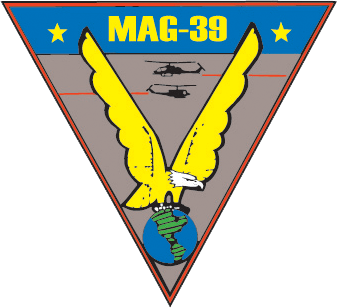
- MAG-39 insignia
- Active: 16 April 1968 – present
- Country: United States
- Allegiance: United States of America
- Branch: United States Marine Corps
- Type: Rotary-wing & Tilt-rotor aircraft group
- Role: Assault Support; Close Air Support
- Part of: 3rd Marine Aircraft Wing; I Marine Expeditionary Force
- Garrison/HQ: Marine Corps Air Station Camp Pendleton
- Nickname: America's MAG
- Motto: "Professional Excellence”
- Engagements: Vietnam War; Operation Desert Storm; Operation Iraqi Freedom * 2003 invasion of Iraq

Commanders
- Current commander: Col George E Fleming

Marine Aircraft Group 39 (MAG-39) is a United States Marine Corps aviation unit based at Marine Corps Base Camp Pendleton, California that is currently composed of four AH-1Z "Viper" Cobra and UH-1Y "Venom" Huey light attack squadrons, two MV-22 Osprey squadrons, an aviation logistics squadron, a Headquarters Squadron, a Marine Wing Support Squadron and the H-1 Fleet Replacement Squadron. The group falls under the command of the 3rd Marine Aircraft Wing (3rd MAW) and the 1st Marine Expeditionary Force (I MEF)

== Mission ==
The mission of Marine Aircraft Group 39 is to provide combat-ready naval expeditionary forces capable of conducting task organized combat aviation support, aviation ground support, and aviation logistics.

== Organization 2024 ==
As of March 2024 the Marine Aircraft Group 39 consists of:

AH-1Z Viper/UH-1Y Venom squadrons:

- HMLA-169
- HMLA-267
- HMLA-367
- HMLA-369
- HMLAT-303

MV-22B Osprey squadrons:

- VMM-164
- VMM-364

Support squadrons:

- Headquarters Squadron 39
- Marine Aviation Logistics Squadron 39 (MALS-39)

== History ==
=== Vietnam War ===
During the spring of 1968, in order to meet the increasing demands on its resources, especially in northern Quảng Trị Province, the 1st Marine Air Wing decided to alter some of its command arrangements. As early as 6 March, acting on a suggestion of his staff, Major General Norman J. Anderson recommended the establishment of a provisional MAG at Quảng Trị Combat Base with three squadrons to reduce the span of control for Marine Aircraft Group 36 (MAG-36). In the meantime, MAG-36 Detachment Alpha comprising a forward headquarters and three squadrons, VMO-6, HMM-163 and HMM-262 was located at Quảng Trị Combat Base under Colonel John E. Hansen, the MAG-36 deputy commander. After securing approval from both Fleet Marine Force, Pacific (FMFPac) and Headquarters, Marine Corps, on 15 April, Anderson ordered the establishment of the new helicopter aircraft group, designated Provisional (Prov) MAG-39. He detached the three squadrons already at Quảng Trị from MAG—36 to form Prov MAG-39 and made Colonel Hansen the new MAG commander. Prov MAG-39 supported the 3rd Marine Division in numerous combat operations including Operations Scotland II, Lancaster, Kentucky, Mameluke Thrust and Jeb Stuart II.

In early 1969 Prov MAG-39 supported Operation Dewey Canyon. During September–October with the 3rd Marine Division redeploying from South Vietnam the role of Prov MAG-39 diminished. On 10 October the group headquarters redeployed to Phu Bai Combat Base and on 15 October it was merged into MAG-36.

On 19 April 1975 Prov MAG-39 was once again activated for duty in preparation for Operation Frequent Wind, the evacuation of Americans and "at risk" South Vietnamese from Saigon. Prov MAG-39 comprised HMH-462, HMH-463, HML-367, HML-369 and HMM-165 and was commanded by Colonel Frank G. McLenon. The evacuation began on 29 April, continued throughout the night and terminated on the morning of 30 April, resulted in the evacuation of 7,000 American citizens, South Vietnamese and foreign nationals. Prov MAG-39 remained on board in the South China Sea until the fleet departed for the Philippines on 2 May 1975 and personnel concerned returned to their parent units.

=== 1970s and 1980s ===
MAG-39 was reactivated 1 September 1978 at Camp Pendleton, California and assigned to the 3rd Marine Aircraft Wing, FMFPac.

=== 1990s to present ===
Elements have participated in: Operation Desert Shield and Desert Storm from August 1990 to April 1991; Operation Restore Hope, Somalia from December 1992–April 1993; Operation Iraqi Freedom, Kuwait from January 2003–October 2003; and Operation Enduring Freedom, Afghanistan from December 2001–June 2002.

== Unit Awards ==
Streamer	Award	Year(s)	Additional Info
	Presidential Unit Citation Streamer with one Bronze Star	2003	Iraq War
	Navy Unit Commendation Streamer with two Bronze Stars	1968, 1975, 1993	Vietnam War, Southeast Asia Evacuations
	Meritorious Unit Commendation Streamer with two Bronze Stars	1968–1969, 1986–1988	Vietnam
	National Defense Service Streamer with two Bronze Stars		
	Armed Forces Expeditionary Streamer		
	Vietnam Service Streamer with one Silver Star and one Bronze Star		
	Afghanistan Campaign Streamer with one Bronze Star		
	Iraq Campaign Streamer with one Bronze Star		
	Global War on Terrorism Expeditionary Streamer		
	Global War on Terrorism Service Streamer		
	Vietnam Gallantry Cross with Palm Streamer		
	Vietnam Meritorious Unit Citation Civil Actions Streamer		

== See also ==
- United States Marine Corps Aviation
- Organization of the United States Marine Corps
- List of United States Marine Corps aircraft groups
- List of United States Marine Corps aircraft squadrons
