= Weapons system trainer =

Weapons Systems Trainer (WST) is a training device (simulator) designed particularly for weapons training. A term commonly used by the United States Department of Defense, particularly for aircraft simulators.

For aircraft, this type of trainer often has a complex terrain database, a wide-angle high-resolution visual system and a high computer capacity, so that weapons work can be practised, recorded, and debriefed. Because of the compromises necessary with a large angle visual system, older WSTs tended not to have a motion platform. With advances in visual display technology such as domes and partial domes compatible with motion platforms and lightweight displays such as the CAE FOHMD, more WSTs are being fitted with motion platforms and so constitute Full Mission Simulators or Combat Mission Simulators (FMS/CMS). For more basic (non-weapons) training, see also Operational Flight Trainer (OFT)
