= HMLA-367 =

Marine Light Attack Helicopter Squadron 367
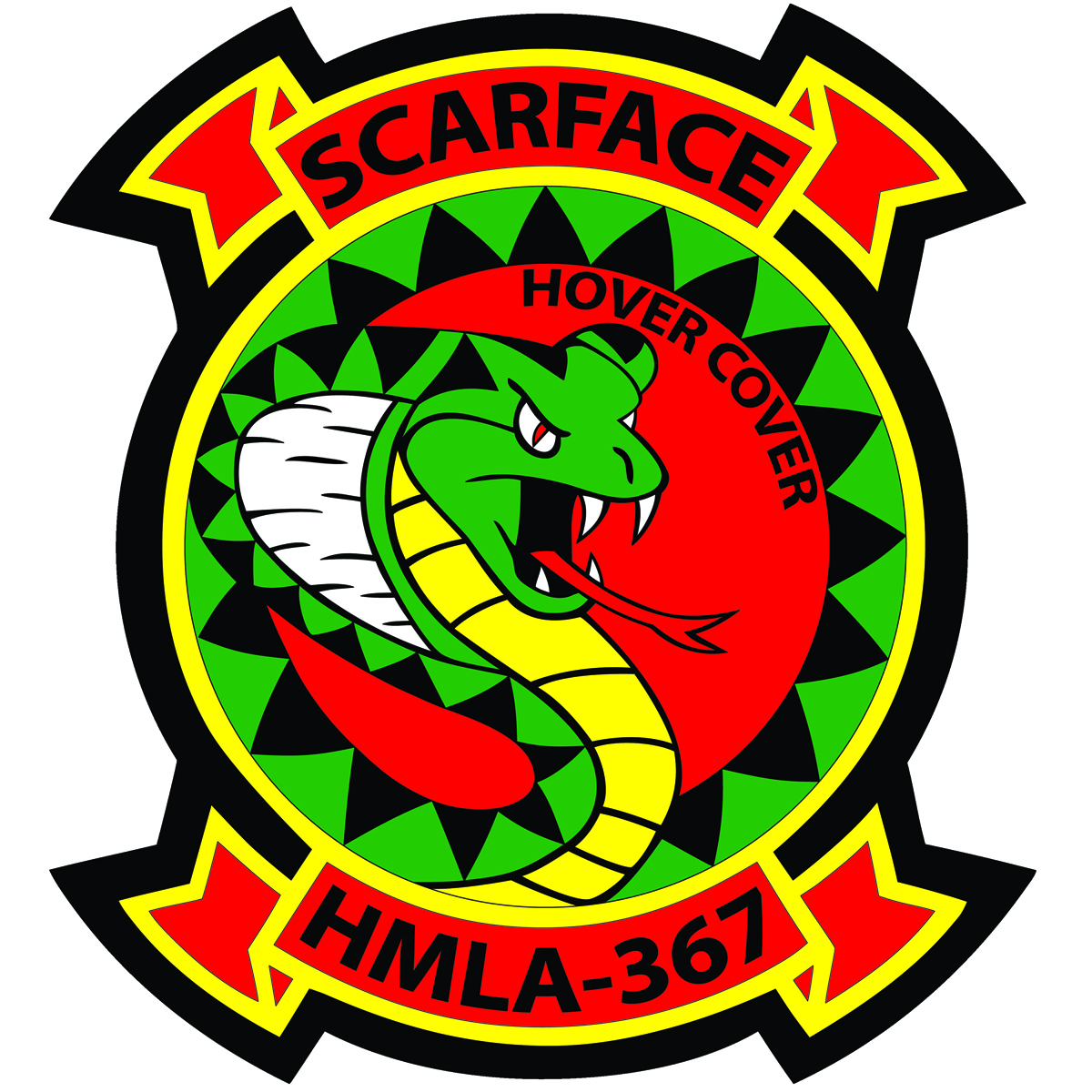
- HMLA-367 insignia
- Active: 1 December 1943 – 20 August 1949; 1 August 1966 – 22 April 2022; 16 December 2022 – Present
- Country: United States
- Allegiance: United States
- Branch: United States Marine Corps
- Type: Light Attack
- Role: Close air support Air interdiction Aerial reconnaissance
- Garrison/HQ: MCAS Camp Pendleton
- Nicknames: Scarface; Oakgate (Vietnam War)
- Mottos: "When you are out of Scarface, you are out of guns" (Vietnam) "Hieu Duuc" ("Can Do" VMO-3) "Hover Cover"
- Tail Code: VT
- Mascot: "Venom" the Snake
- Anniversaries: 1 December 1943
- Engagements: World War II * Battle of Peleliu * Battle of Okinawa; Vietnam War; *Operation Dewey Canyon; *Operation Lam Son 719 * Operation Eagle Pull * Operation Frequent Wind; Gulf War; Operation Iraqi Freedom * Second Battle of Fallujah; Operation Enduring Freedom * Operation Moshtarak

Commanders
- Current commander: LtCol Dan "RECO" Chiriboga

Marine Light Attack Helicopter Squadron 367 (HMLA-367) is a United States Marine Corps helicopter squadron consisting of AH-1Z Viper attack helicopters and UH-1Y Venom utility helicopters. Originally commissioned during World War II, the squadron participated in combat operations on Peleliu and Okinawa. Reactivated during the Vietnam War, the squadron has served during numerous conflicts since. The squadron is based at Marine Corps Air Station Camp Pendleton in California and falls under the command of Marine Aircraft Group 39 (MAG-39) and the 3rd Marine Aircraft Wing (3rd MAW).

== Mission ==
The mission of HMLA-367 is to support the Marine Air-Ground Task Force (MAGTF) Commander by providing offensive air support, utility support, armed escort and airborne supporting arms coordination, day or night, under all weather conditions during expeditionary, joint, or combined operations.

== History ==
=== World War II ===
Artillery Spotting Division, Marine Observation Squadron 351 (ASD(VMO-351)) was commissioned on 1 December 1943 at Marine Corps Base Quantico in Virginia. On 15 January 1944, the squadron was re-designated as Marine Observation Squadron 3 (VMO-3) while preparing to deploy overseas. During February 1944, VMO-3 departed San Diego and arrived at Espiritu Santo on 4 March 1944. The squadron spent the next few months in the Russell Islands continuing to train. On 17 September 1944, the forward echelon of VMO-3 landed on Peleliu Airfield, two days after the initial invasion. The squadron supported operations on Peleliu and on 28 September it also supported the assault on Ngesebus. On 22 October 1944 VMO-3 departed Peleliu for the Russell Islands to begin training with III Marine Amphibious Corps artillery.

On 10 March 1945, VMO-3 sailed for Ulithi where it transferred to escort carriers for movement to Okinawa. On 3 April 1945, two OY-1 Grasshoppers from VMO-3 landed on Yontan Airfield. These were the first American planes to land on the island. The squadron commenced operations from Yontan the following day immediately supporting four artillery battalions. By 11 April, VMO-3 was supporting eleven artillery batteries ashore.

Following the surrender of Japan, VMO-3 departed for Northern China in September 1945. On 10 October, the USS Bougainville (CVE-100) arrived at the Taku Forts, and disembarked VMO-3, which was tasked to support the 3rd Marines. The squadron participated in the occupation of North China from October 1945 through June 1947. VMO-3 relocated to Guam in July 1947 and moved again in May 1949 to Marine Corps Air Station Cherry Point, North Carolina, being assigned to the 2nd Marine Aircraft Wing. The squadron was decommissioned on 20 August 1949.

=== Vietnam War ===
As the United States increased its presence in the South Vietnam, the Marine Corps reactivated VMO-3 at Marine Corps Air Station Camp Pendleton on 1 August 1966 and assigned it to Marine Wing Support Group 37. The squadron arrived in Vietnam in December 1966 and were now flying the UH-1E. VMO-3 became fully operational at Huế/Phu Bai on 16 January 1967.

In 1966 and for the first half of 1967, the squadron's radio call sign was "Oakgate," which sometimes got confused for the term OK. Major Bill Murphy is credited with first using the call "Scarface" while on TAD, and lobbied to have the substantially more macho Scarface designation adopted as VMO-3's signature when all Marine squadrons in-country changed call signs during the summer of 1967. On 14 November 1967 Major General Bruno Hochmuth, then commanding general of the 3rd Marine Division was killed when a UH-1E Huey from VMO-3 exploded and crashed 5 miles northwest of Huế. Four others also died in this crash.

The squadron assumed a new identity in March 1968 when VMO-3 was re-designated HML-367 and immediately began operations in direct support of ground combat units. Based at Hue and Phu Bai, the squadron flew the Bell UH-1E Huey throughout I Corps in support of the 1st and 3rd Marine Divisions, the United States Army and the Army of the Republic of Vietnam. In addition to the countless other missions flown they most notably supported Operations Medina, Fortress Ridge, Prairie Fire, Project Delta, Sparrow Hawk, Dewey Canyon, Apache Snow, Swift Saber and Lam Son 719.

In addition to participating in the above operations, the Scarface crews also flew near daily missions in support of MACV-SOG on what were then top secret reconnaissance missions deep into Laos.

Squadron assets quickly grew from eighteen aircraft (UH-1E) to twenty five. In 1969, HML-367 exceeded 2,000 flight hours for the month of June. October 1969 saw the departure of Marine Air Group 36 from the Republic of Vietnam. Due to the continued necessity for armed helicopter support, HML-367 remained in Vietnam and was assigned to Marine Aircraft Group 16 (Forward) at Hue/Phu Bai.

The squadron supported almost every type of helicopter mission flown by Marines in Vietnam. Most missions were flown in support of Marine units, but many were flown for the U.S. Army and for the Korean Marines. With the increased Vietnamization of the War, numerous sorties were flown supporting the Army of the Republic of Vietnam.

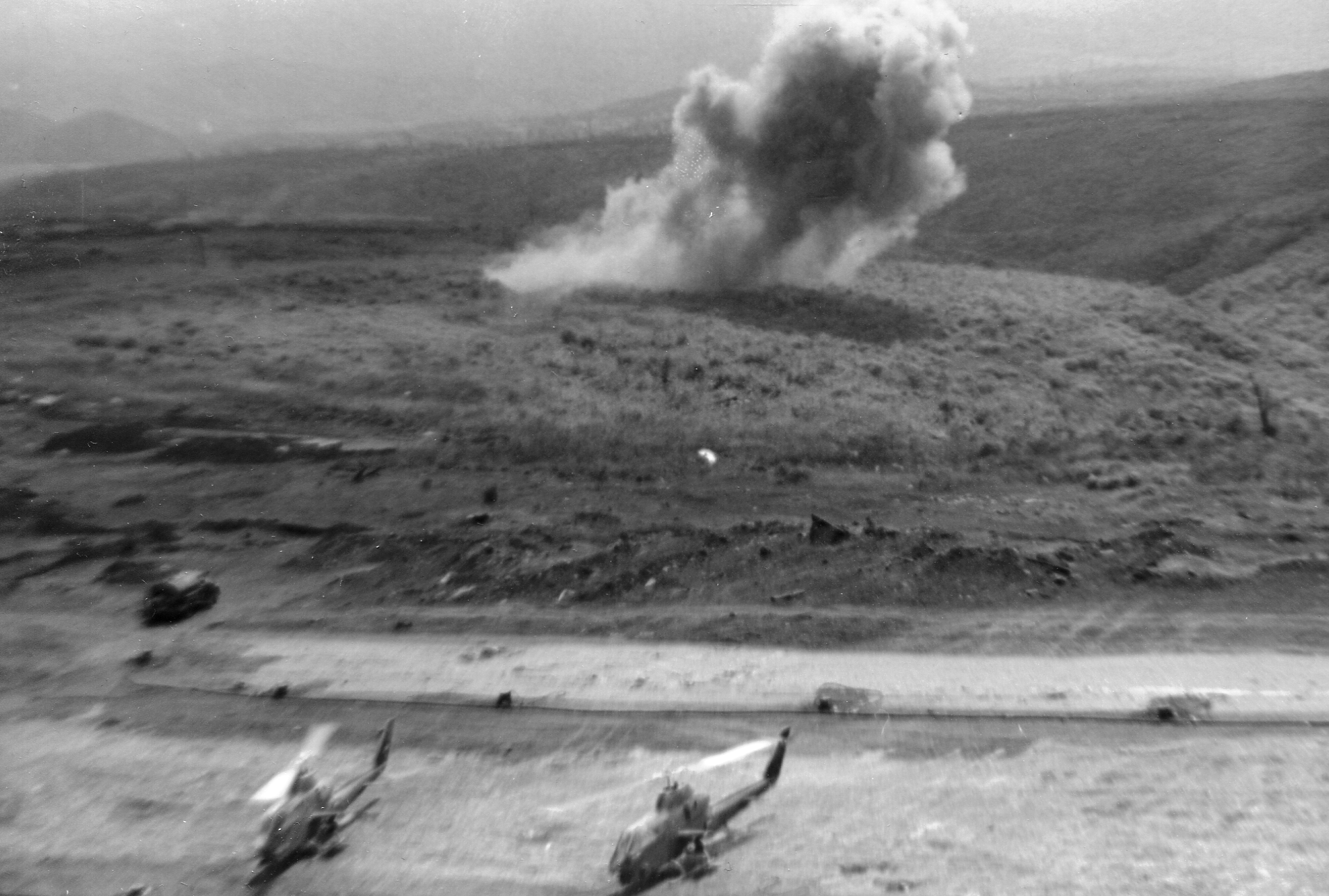
Mortar impacts near two AH-1G Cobra helicopters from HMLA-367, Khe Sanh Combat Base

On 24 April 1970, the Squadron had all of their twenty-five aircraft in an "Up" status. This was the first time a Helicopter Squadron had attained 100% aircraft availability in Vietnam. To celebrate the event, a 25-plane "fly-over" of Marble Mountain Air Facility was conducted with Plane Captains called on to fill the front seats of all 25 Cobras. Total flight time for Fiscal Year 1970 was 22,378 hours.

HML-367 completed its combat tour in South Vietnam in June 1971, and relocated to MCAS Futenma, Okinawa, rejoining MAG-36. Once established, the Squadron began peacetime operations using the UH-1E.

=== Post-Vietnam 1970s ===
In April 1975, HML-367(REIN), with nine UH-1E's and twelve CH-46's deployed aboard the USS Midway and the USS Hancock in support of Operations Eagle Pull and Talon Vise/Frequent Wind, participating in the evacuation of Phnom Penh and Saigon. In June 1975, HML-367 returned to Okinawa and resumed normal operations. In 1976, the squadron took receipt of the new UH-1N and in 1977, AH-1J's Cobra gunships.

After more than eight years on the island of Okinawa, HML-367 was reassigned to Marine Aircraft Group 39 (MAG-39), 3rd Marine Aircraft Wing, at MCAS Camp Pendleton. The majority of squadron personnel stayed behind, having been transferred to other units of the 1st Marine Air Wing. New personnel were selected from the parent command, and by August 1981, unit strength was up to 165 men and 16 aircraft.

=== 1980s and 1990s ===
During this timeframe the HMLA-367 spent approximately six of each eighteen months split into rotations to Marine Corps Air Station Futenma, Okinawa, Japan as well as attached as Det "A" in Subic Bay, Philippines, and as part of an Aviation Combat Element (ACE) aboard an amphibious assault ship, typically the USS Tarawa while in rotation with two other squadrons also based at MCAS Camp Pendleton.

While not on their rotation overseas, HMLA-367 supported major exercises deploying for training frequently to the Marine Corps Air Ground Combat Center Twentynine Palms, Marine Corps Air Station Yuma, Nellis Air Force Base, and Naval Air Station Fallon.

HMLA-367 also supported combined U.S. Navy & USMC security operations, "Kernel Usher & Kernel Blitz" aboard the USS Tarawa and other naval ships for exercises around the Pacific Coast of California.

=== Desert Storm and Desert Shield ===
Shortly after the invasion of Kuwait on 2 August 1990 HMLA-367 was quickly chosen as the Light Attack component for Marine Aircraft Group 70 (MAG-70) in support of Operation Desert Shield/Storm and immediately deployed.

Scarface arrived in Al Jabail, Saudi Arabia on 29 August 1990, as the first operational U.S. Marine Light Attack Helicopter Squadron in theater. HMLA-367 recorded the first Iraqi tank kill by an AH-1W "Super Cobra" Helicopter during the battle of "Al Elbow" in Southwestern Kuwait on 30 January 1991.

HMLA-367 also had confirmed kills of military targets during both the Battle of Khafji on 30–31 January 1991 and the ground war which commenced on 24 February 1991.

HMLA-367 accrued confirmed kills of 48 tanks, 24 armored personnel carriers and 23 other troop transport vehicles, trucks, etc., as well as many other military targets, more than any other operational combat squadron during Desert Storm/Desert Storm.

On 12 March 1991, Scarface concluded operations and began departing Saudi Arabia, returning to Camp Pendleton, California.

HMLA-367 Scarface Marines were all awarded the National Defense Service Medal, Southwest Asia Service Medal with 2 bronze stars, the Kuwait Liberation Medal (Saudi Arabia), & the Kuwait Liberation Medal ( Kuwait) for their service during Operation Desert Storm & Desert Shield combat operations.

=== Operations in Iraq and Afghanistan ===
The squadron was deployed for 13 months to Okinawa from 2002 to 2003 and this was followed less than a year later by a deployment to Al Taqaddum, Iraq in support of Operation Iraqi Freedom.

While there, the squadron flew in support of numerous ground units including the 1st Marine Division during the Battle of Fallujah. In the next three years, Scarface would return to Iraq two more times in support of OIF 05-07.2 and OIF 08.1-08.2.

After three deployments to Iraq in only four years, Scarface returned to MCAS Camp Pendleton in November 2008 to transition its Huey pilots to the new UH-1Y, and to prepare for upcoming operations in Afghanistan.

After yet another turnaround of less than a year, HMLA-367 deployed to Afghanistan in October 2009 to support international security and assistance forces during Operation Enduring Freedom. The seven-month deployment was the first combat deployment of the UH-1Y. The squadron's skills were again put to the test as Scarface simultaneously provided support for seven infantry battalions and participated in the battles for Marjah and Now Zad in the Helmand Province of Afghanistan.

In April 2011 "Scarface" HMLA-367 was the first squadron to have both the newest upgraded four-blade rotor UH-1Y "Yankee" Huey utility helicopter and the AH-1Z "Zulu" Cobra gunships along with a state of the art flight simulator for each helicopter.

In 2012, Scarface deployed personnel and helicopters to the 15th MEU prior to moving the remainder of the squadron to its current location of Marine Corps Air Station Kaneohe Bay on island of Oahu in Hawaii. The unit reverted to the venerable AH-1W Super Cobra prior to the relocation to MCAS Kaneohe Bay. They have also conducted numerous deployments as part of the 31st MEU and to Okinawa as part of the Unit Deployment Program (UDP).

In March 2018, Scarface and the Marine Corps bid their final farewell to the AH-1W Super Cobra helicopters on Marine Corps Base Hawaii.

HMLA-367 was decommissioned in April 2022 as a part of the Commandant of the Marine Corps Force Design 2030 initiative and reactivated on 16 December 2022 aboard Marine Corps Air Station Camp Pendleton, California.

== Unit awards ==
A unit citation or commendation is an award bestowed upon an organization for the action cited. Members of the unit who participated in said actions are allowed to wear on their uniforms the awarded unit citation. HMLA-367 has been presented with the following awards:

Ribbon	Unit Award		
	Presidential Unit Citation with four Bronze Stars		
	Navy Unit Commendation with one Silver and three Bronze Stars		
	Meritorious Unit Commendation with one Silver and one Bronze Star		
	Asiatic-Pacific Campaign Medal with two Bronze Stars		
	World War II Victory Medal		
	National Defense Service Medal with two Bronze Stars		
	China Service Medal		
	Vietnam Service Medal with two Silver Stars and one Bronze Star		
	Vietnam Meritorious Unit Citation Civil Action Medal		
	Southwest Asia Service Streamer with two Bronze Stars	August 1990 – February 1991	Desert Shield, Desert Storm
	Kuwait Liberation Medal (Kuwait)	August 1990 – February 1991	Desert Shield, Desert Storm
	Kuwait Liberation Medal (Saudi Arabia)	17 January 1991 – 28 February 1991	Desert Shield, Desert Storm
	Iraq Campaign Medal with two Bronze Stars		
	Afghanistan Campaign Medal		
	Global War on Terrorism Service Medal		

== See also ==
- List of United States Marine Corps aircraft squadrons
- United States Marine Corps Aviation
