= HMLA-369 =

Marine Light Attack Helicopter Squadron 369
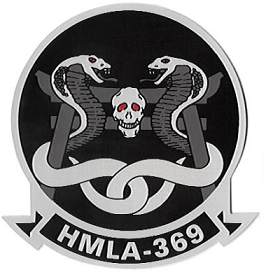
- HMLA-369 insignia
- Active: 1 April 1972 - present
- Country: United States
- Branch: United States Marine Corps
- Type: Light/Attack squadron
- Role: Close air support Air interdiction Assault support
- Part of: Marine Aircraft Group 39; 3rd Marine Aircraft Wing
- Garrison/HQ: Marine Corps Air Station Camp Pendleton
- Nicknames: "Gunfighters" "Pistol Pete" (Vietnam War)
- Tail Code: SM
- Engagements: Vietnam War; Operation MARHUK; Operation Eagle Pull; Operation Frequent Wind; Operation Desert Storm; Operation Restore Hope; Global war on terrorism; Operation Enduring Freedom; War in Afghanistan; Operation Anaconda; Operation Swift Freedom; Operation Iraqi Freedom

Commanders
- Commanding officer: LtCol Michael J. Harper

Marine Light Attack Helicopter Squadron 369 (HMLA-369) is a United States Marine Corps helicopter squadron consisting of AH-1Z Viper attack helicopters and UH-1Y Venom utility helicopters. The squadron, also known as the "Gunfighters", is based at Marine Corps Air Station Camp Pendleton in California and falls under the command of Marine Aircraft Group 39 (MAG-39) and the 3rd Marine Aircraft Wing (3rd MAW).

== Mission ==
Support the Marine Air-Ground Task Force commander by providing offensive air support, utility support, armed escort and airborne supporting arms coordination, day or night under all weather conditions during expeditionary, joint or combined operations.

== History ==
=== Vietnam War ===
HMA-369 was commissioned on 1 April 1972, at Marine Corps Air Station Futenma in Okinawa, assigned to Marine Aircraft Group 36, 1st Marine Aircraft Wing. Two months after being activated, the squadron was deployed to North Vietnam to participate in Operation MARHUK (Marine Hunter Killer). "Pistol Pete" as the squadron was then known, had the distinction of being the first attack helicopter squadron in Marine Corps history to conduct offensive air operations. This occurred on 20 June 1972, when HMA-369 AH-1J Seacobras, operating from the USS Denver, began interdicting enemy barges and ferries and acting as low lying Forward Air Controllers for Navy carrier strikes. The squadron subsequently transferred to USS Cleveland and finally USS Dubuque while conducting MARHUK operations. The Marine Corps Aviation Association honored HMA-369 with their Helicopter Squadron of the Year Award in 1972. HMA-369 was also awarded a Navy Unit Citation for this period. The squadron redeployed to Okinawa in January 1973, but remained active in the conflict through Operation Eagle Pull and Operation Frequent Wind in 1975, flying numerous sorties supporting the evacuation of Saigon.

=== Post Vietnam ===
In April 1977, HMA-369 was disestablished on Okinawa and reestablished in California at Marine Corps Base Camp Pendleton as a member of Detachment Marine Aircraft Group 16, 3rd MAW. In August 1983, HMA-369 had the distinction of being the first helicopter squadron of any service to participate in the United States Air Force Red Flag aviation combat exercise.

In October 1985, HMA-369 was in Hong Kong to support then Vice-President George H. W. Bush's trip to the People's Republic of China. On two separate occasions, the Gunfighters flew four UH-1Ns from Hong Kong across the Red Chinese border to the cities Guangzhou and Shenzhen. This historic trip marked the first time since 1949 that a tactical Marine squadron had entered Communist China's airspace.

Also during 1987, UH-1Ns were made a permanent part of the HMA-369 and on 15 September 1987 HMA-369 was officially re-designated as Marine Light Attack Helicopter Squadron 369 (HMLA-369). In October 1987, the majority of AH-1J pilots attended the AH-1W pilot's familiarization course in Dallas, Texas, and on 30 October 1987, HMLA-369 received its first AH-1W.

=== Gulf War and the 1990s ===
In 1990, HMLA-369 was one of the squadrons chosen as the HMLA component of Marine Aircraft Group 70 (MAG-70) in support of Operation Desert Shield. The Gunfighters advanced team arrived in Saudi Arabia on 16 August 1990, operating as the first Marine Light Attack Helicopter Squadron in theater.

During Desert Shield the Gunfighters were called to war. Throughout the war, the Gunfighters distinguished themselves both in the planning and execution phases of the air and ground wars. On 10 March 1991, the Gunfighters departed Saudi Arabia, returning to Camp Pendleton. In November, the Gunfighters received the MCAA Squadron of the Year Award. Numerous officers and crew were decorated for valor, most notable the Commanding Officer, Michael M. "Spot" Kurth, who was awarded the Navy Cross.

On 28 November 1992, HMLA-369 began planning for Operation Restore Hope, the international United Nations humanitarian relief effort in Somalia. On 3 December 1992, the Gunfighters were assigned as the force in readiness and by 1 January 1993, the entire squadron was deployed to Baledogle, Somalia, as the sole light attack helicopter squadron in theater operating under Marine Aircraft Group 16 HMLA -369 flew a variety of missions including Close In Fire Support, Command and Control, MEDEVAC, Escort, Visual and Photo Reconnaissance, Logistical Supply, VIP, and Non-Governmental Organization (NGO) support. HMLA-369 logged 1,098 flight hours during January. The Gunfighters returned to Camp Pendleton in April 1993.

November 1993 saw the Gunfighters depart for Okinawa in support of the UDP deployment Program. Additionally, the Gunfighters provided detachments for the 11th and 31st Marine Expeditionary Units (Special Operations Capable) (MEU(SOC)). The Gunfighter 11th MEU(SOC) Detachment supported Operation Continue Hope and Operation Distant Runner, aiding in the evacuation of Americans from war torn Rwanda.

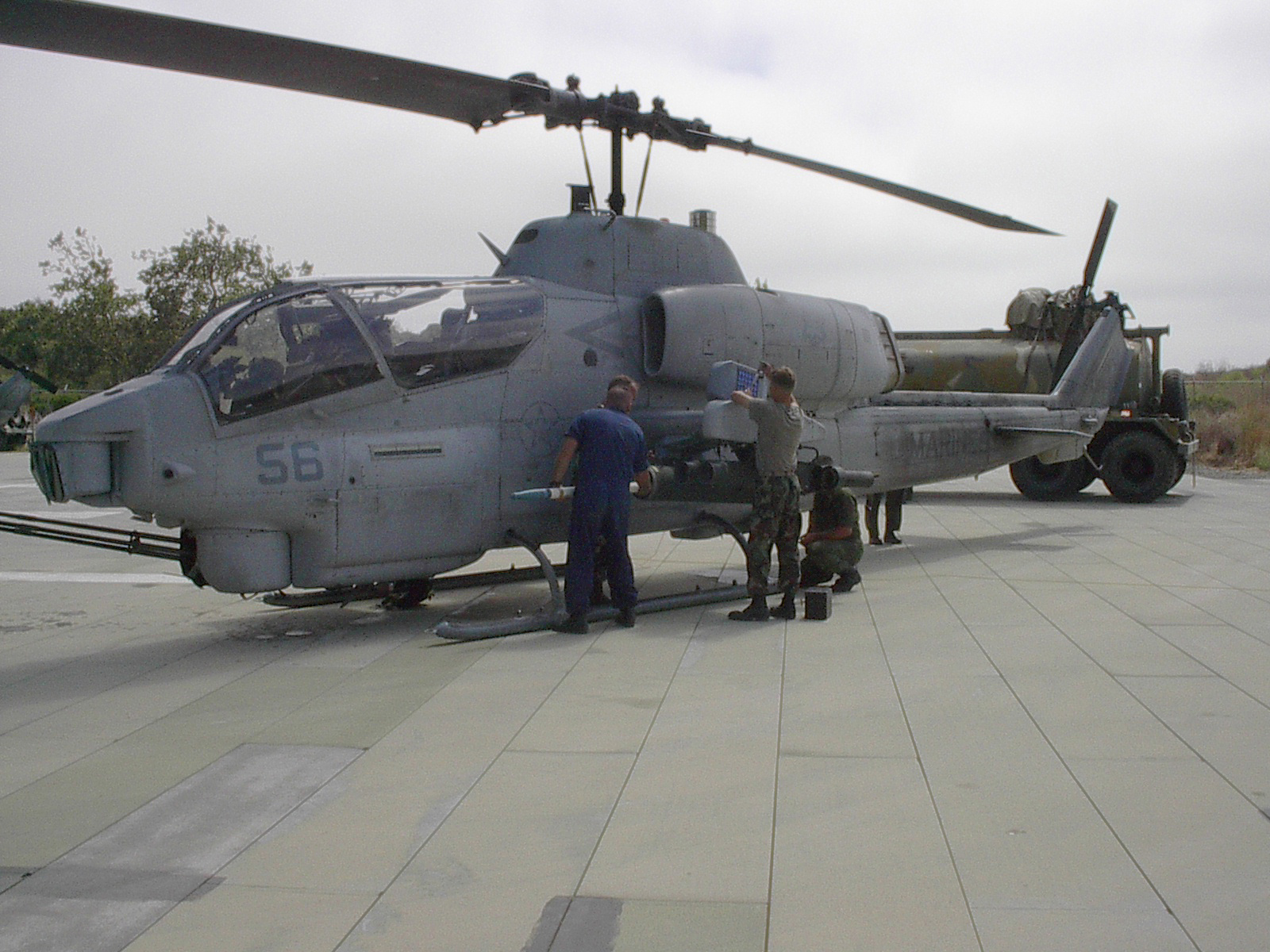

=== Global war on terror ===
The Gunfighters of the 13th Marine Expeditionary Unit aboard the USS Bonhomme Richard, received word from Central Command on 3 March 2002 that their assets would be needed to support the Coalition Joint Task Force (CJTF) operating out of Bagram Air Base in Afghanistan. The Gunfighter's six AH-1Ws flew 22 days of continuous combat operations which included attached, detached and combined escort, close air support (CAS), forward air control (FAC(A)), and armed reconnaissance.

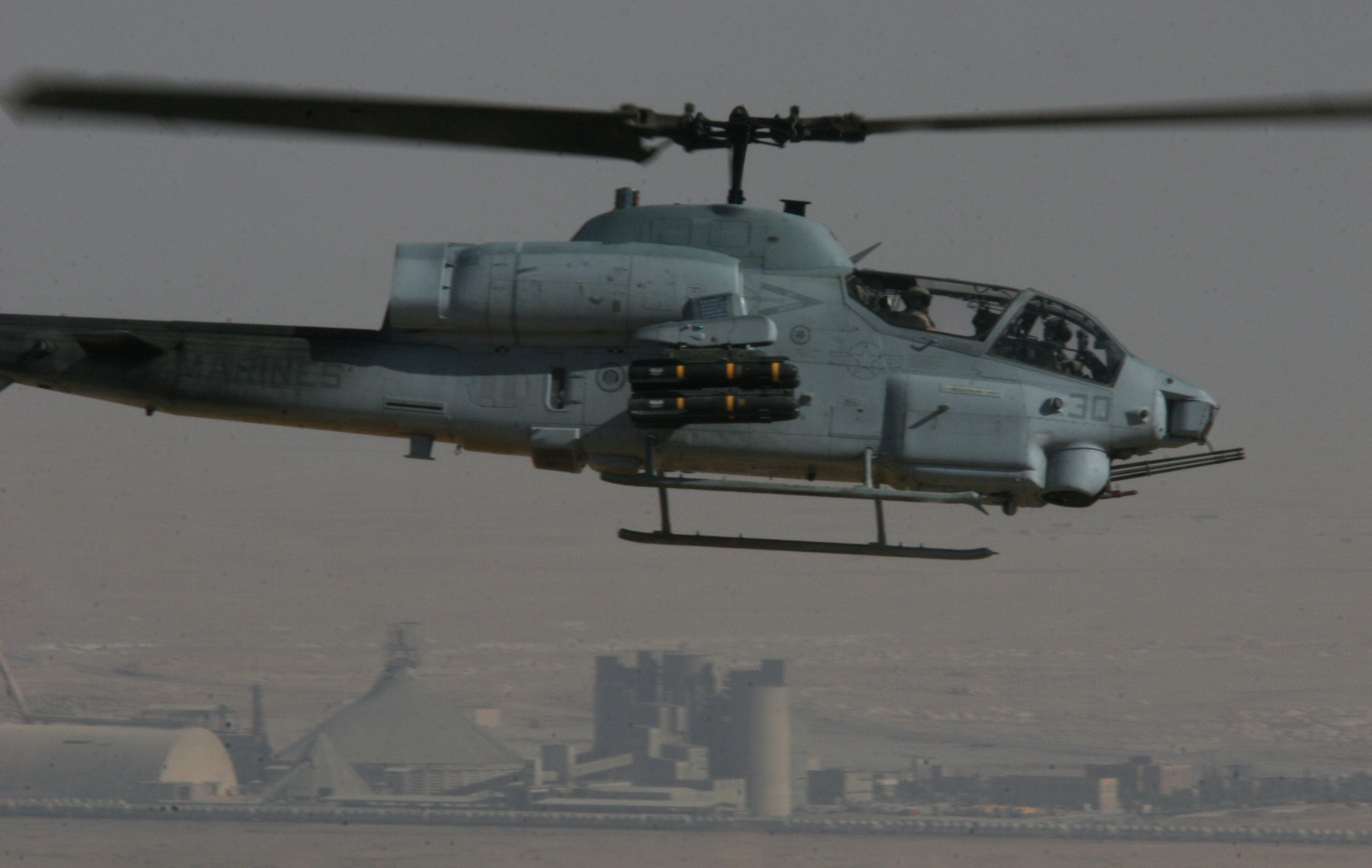
HMLA-369 Cobra over Al Qaim, Iraq in November 2005

HMLA-369 arrived in Kuwait on 13 April 2003 and within three days began conducting combat operations in the skies of Iraq. In April 2003 the Gunfighters carried out over 300 combat missions into Iraq, from Ali Al Salem, Kuwait, providing combat support to Marines on the ground. Amassing over 600 mishap-free hours, the Gunfighters directly supported the 1st Marine Expeditionary Force. The Gunfighters flew over 1,300 mishap-free flight hours while performing offensive air and utility support missions. In the month of May alone, HMLA-369 flew 948.3 hours and completed 638 combat sorties.

Working mostly out of Blair Field, a forward operating base (FOB) in Al Kut, Iraq, the Gunfighters provided continuous air coverage in northeastern Iraq. From 27 June to 1 July, the Gunfighters flew air support for British allies in southeastern Iraq. The British ground forces requested close air support for their sweep of the towns of Al Amarah and Al Silah. The month of July was short for Marine Light Attack Helicopter Squadron 369. The Gunfighters concluded flight operations in support of Operation Iraqi Freedom on 12 July.

The Gunfighters finished up their second rotation in support of Operation Iraqi Freedom and are based at Forward Operating Base, Al Taqaddum, Iraq. As part of 2nd MAW (FWD), MAG-26(FWD). During the course of the deployment, on 2 November 2005, an AH-1W Super Cobra from the squadron was shot down near Ramadi, killing the two Marines on board. In Jan 2007 SgtMaj Ledford is posted as the squadron SgtMaj. The unit deployed to Iraq again from April 2007 to November or 2007 and from November 2008 to May 2009. In June 2009 SgtMaj Berry is posted as the Squadron SgtMaj. The Gunfighters then deployed to Camp Leatherneck, Afghanistan from April 2010 to November 2010. While in support of Operation Enduring Freedom (OEF), HMLA-369 had an AH-1W shot down, killing the two Marines on board. In December 2010, Lt.Col Clark assumed command of the Gunfighters. In May 2011 SgtMaj Golden is posted as the Squadron SgtMaj and June 2011 LtCol Smith assumed command of the Squadron and HMLA-369 Deployed again to Afghanistan. In June 2013 SgtMaj Buenafe is posted as the Squadron SgtMaj. In November 2013 HMLA-369 Deployed for the final time in war to Camp Bastion Afghanistan, in support of Global war on Terrorism and continue to sustained its readiness for future conflicts and deployments around the world.

=== Present ===
==== 2025 AH-1Z Viper helicopter training crash ====
On October 16, 2025, during a routine training exercise on a AH-1Z Viper in Southern California, one Marine pilot was killed and another injured after their helicopter crashed in an "aviation mishap". According to a report released the following day by Maj. Gen. James B. Wellons, commander of the 3rd Marine Aircraft Wing those involved were part of, the Marine pilots crashed at approximately 7:05pm in a remote part of the Southern California desert near the sparsely populated community of Imperial Gables. The Marines were undergoing standard training as part of the seven-week Marine Corps Weapons and Tactics Instructor Course 1-26, which was to conclude ten days later. One of the pilots was brought to Pioneers Memorial Hospital in the city of Brawley by emergency personnel, where he was pronounced dead, and the other to Desert Regional Medical Center in the city of Palm Springs, where he was confirmed to be in stable condition. An investigation into the specific cause of the crash was immediately started, which could take up to several months before findings released to the public. The American weekly news magazine Newsweek commented the crash mattered as it highlights persistent safety concerns of military aviators in the US, even during peace time.

== See also ==
- United States Marine Corps Aviation
- List of active United States Marine Corps aircraft squadrons
- List of inactive United States Marine Corps aircraft squadrons
