= Bell UH-1Y Venom =

Military utility helicopter model by Bell

UH-1Y Venom
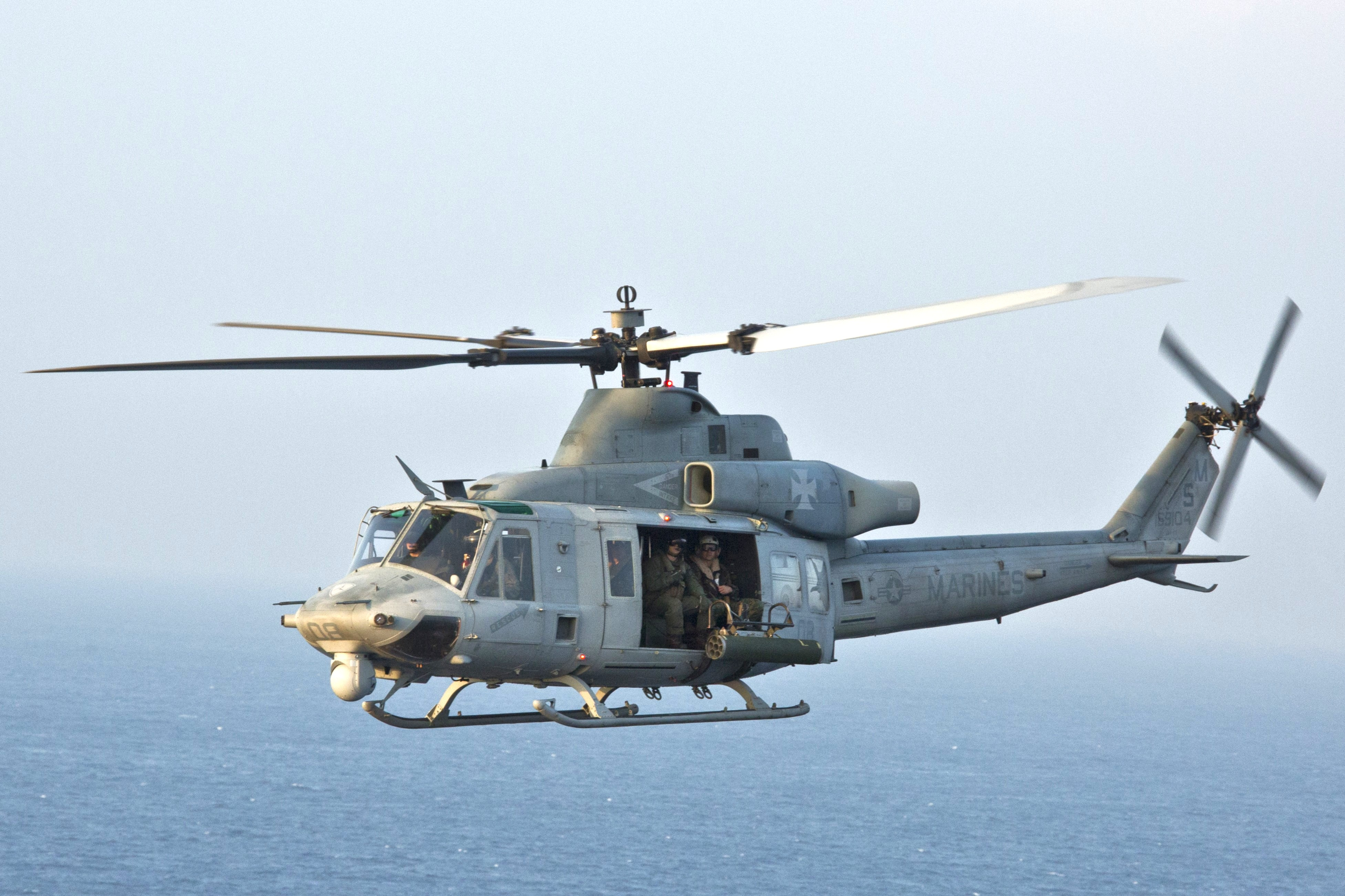
- A UH-1Y in flight

General information
- Type: Utility helicopter
- National origin: United States
- Manufacturer: Bell Textron
- Status: In service
- Primary users: United States Marine Corps Czech Air Force
- Number built: 160

History
- Manufactured: 2001–present
- Introduction date: 8 August 2008
- First flight: 20 December 2001
- Developed from: Bell UH-1N Twin Huey

The Bell UH-1Y Venom (also called Super Huey) is a twin-engine, 4-blade, medium-sized utility helicopter built by Bell Textron under the H-1 upgrade program of the United States Marine Corps. One of the latest members of the numerous Huey family, the UH-1Y is also called "Yankee" for the NATO phonetic alphabet pronunciation of its variant letter. Bell was originally to produce UH-1Ys by rebuilding UH-1Ns, but ultimately used new built airframes.

In 2008, the UH-1Y entered service with the Marine Corps and also began full-rate production. The new UH-1 variant replaced the USMC's UH-1N Twin Huey light utility helicopters, introduced in the early 1970s. The helicopter, and related Bell AH-1Z Viper, were ordered by the Czech Republic and the helicopter is in production in the early 2020s. Visually, some features that differentiate the Y model are a slightly longer cabin and larger twin engine exhaust vents compared to the earlier N model.

== Development ==
Over the years, new avionics and radios, modern door guns, and safety upgrades have greatly increased the UH-1N's empty weight. With a maximum speed around 100 knots (190 km/h) and an inability to lift much more than its own crew, fuel, and ammunition, the UH-1N had limited capabilities as a transport.

In 1996, the United States Marine Corps launched the H-1 upgrade program. A contract was signed with Bell Helicopter for upgrading 100 UH-1Ns into UH-1Ys and upgrading 180 AH-1Ws into AH-1Zs. The H-1 program modernized utility and attack helicopters with considerable design commonality to reduce operating costs. The UH-1Y and AH-1Z share a common tail boom, engines, rotor system, drivetrain, avionics architecture, software, controls, and displays for over 84% identical components.

=== Production ===
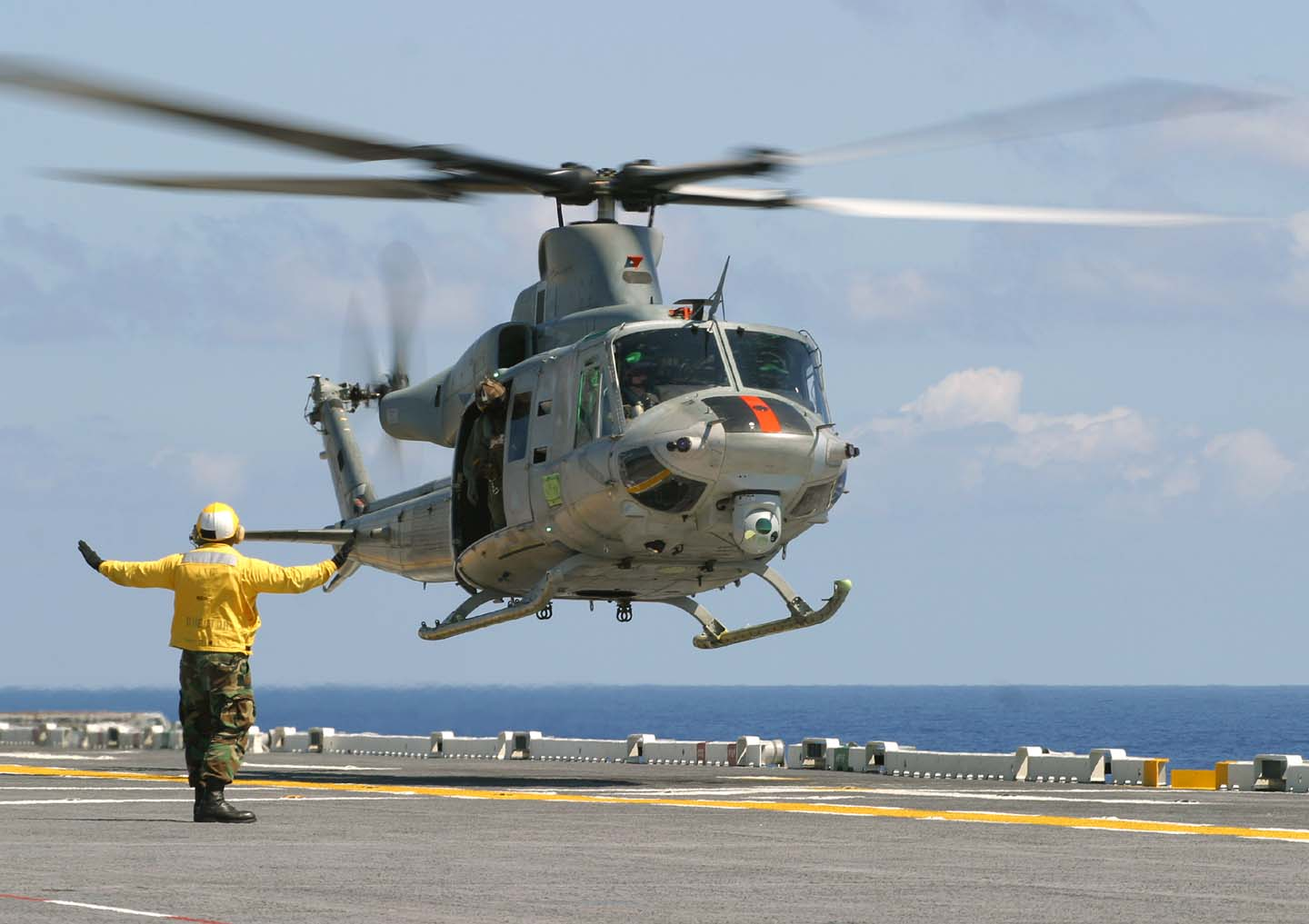
A UH-1Y during sea trials aboard USS Bataan

Originally, the UH-1Y was to be remanufactured from UH-1N airframes. In April 2005, approval was granted to build them as new helicopters. In February 2008, Bell delivered two UH-1Ys to the U.S. Marine Corps. Full-rate production began in September 2009. The Marine Corps purchased 160 Y-models to replace their inventory of N-models.

The final UH-1Y for the U.S. Marine Corps was delivered in January 2019. In 2021, the production line restarted to produce the UH-1Ys for the Czech Republic's order. 160 have been produced with 8 more being made for the aforementioned Czech order as of 2022.

== Design ==
The UH-1Y variant modernizes the UH-1 design. The Y-model upgrades pilot avionics to a glass cockpit, adds further safety modifications, and provides the UH-1 with a modern forward-looking infrared system. Engine power was increased. Its most noticeable upgrade over previous variants is a four-blade, all-composite rotor system designed to withstand up to 23 mm rounds. By replacing the engines and the two-bladed rotor system with four composite blades, the Y-model returns the Huey to the utility role for which it was designed.

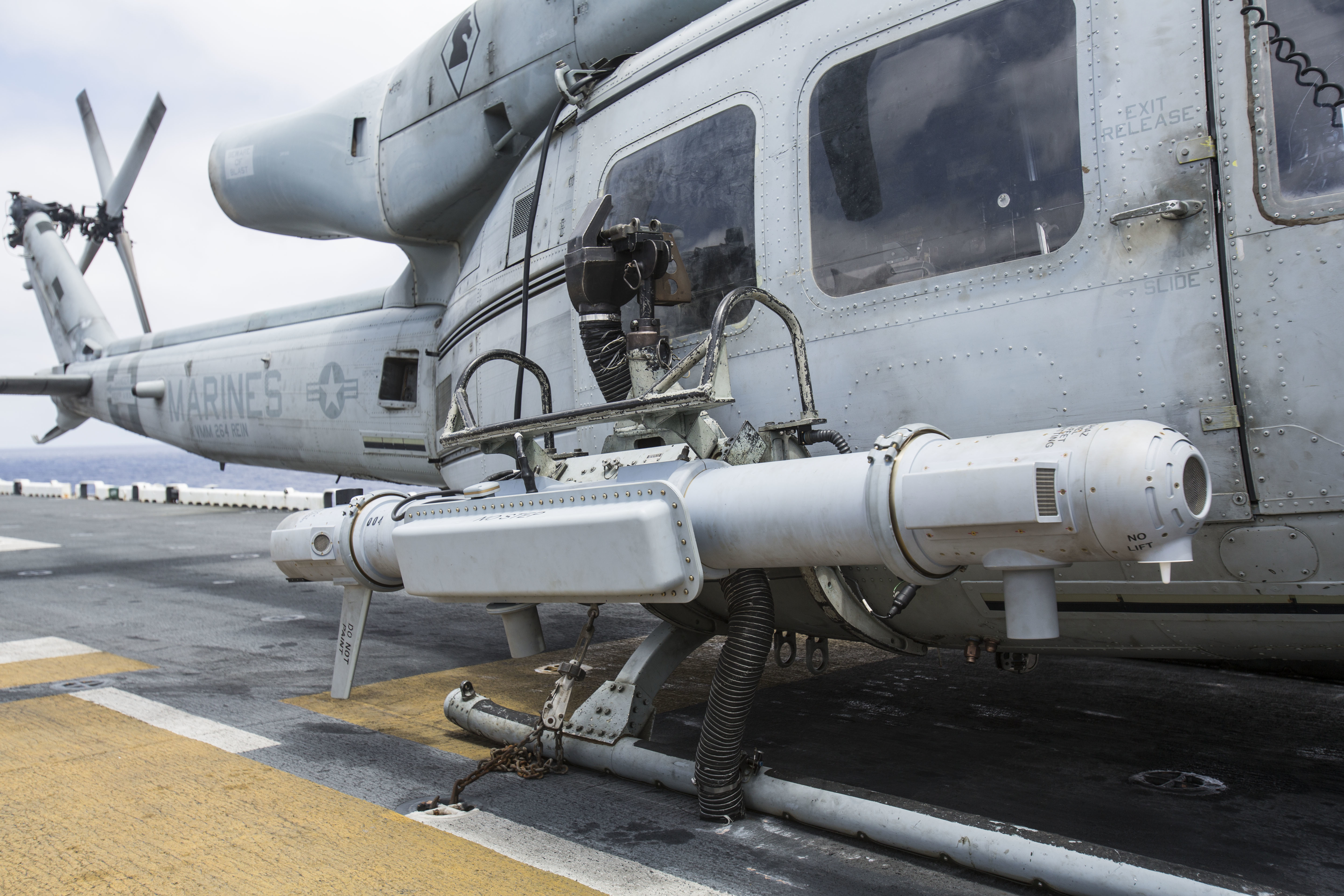
The AN/ALQ-231 Intrepid Tiger II pod on a UH-1Y

A 21-inch (530 mm) fuselage extension just forward of the main door was added for more capacity. The UH-1Y features upgraded transmissions and a digital cockpit with flat-panel multifunctional displays. Compared to the UH-1N, the Y-model has an increased payload, almost 50% greater range, a reduction in vibration, and a higher cruising speed.

The weapons used on the UH-1Y include a variety of rocket and machine guns. This includes 2.75-inch (70 mm) rockets on the external hardpoints, and LAU-68, LAU-61, M260, and M261 launchers with Mk 66 rockets (Hydra 70). Machine guns include M240D, GAU-16, GAU-21, and GAU-17A.

The UH-1Y can be fitted with the AN/ALQ-231(V)3 Intrepid Tiger II (IT II), an advanced electronic warfare pod designed to provide precise, on-demand electronic attack and support capabilities. It features an open architecture and rapid reprogrammability, allowing it to adapt to evolving threats. The IT II can be controlled from the cockpit or by a ground operator, enabling flexible deployment in various combat scenarios. It gives the UH-1Y the ability to jam enemy communications, gather signals intelligence, and disrupt adversary networks, making it a crucial asset for electronic warfare operations.

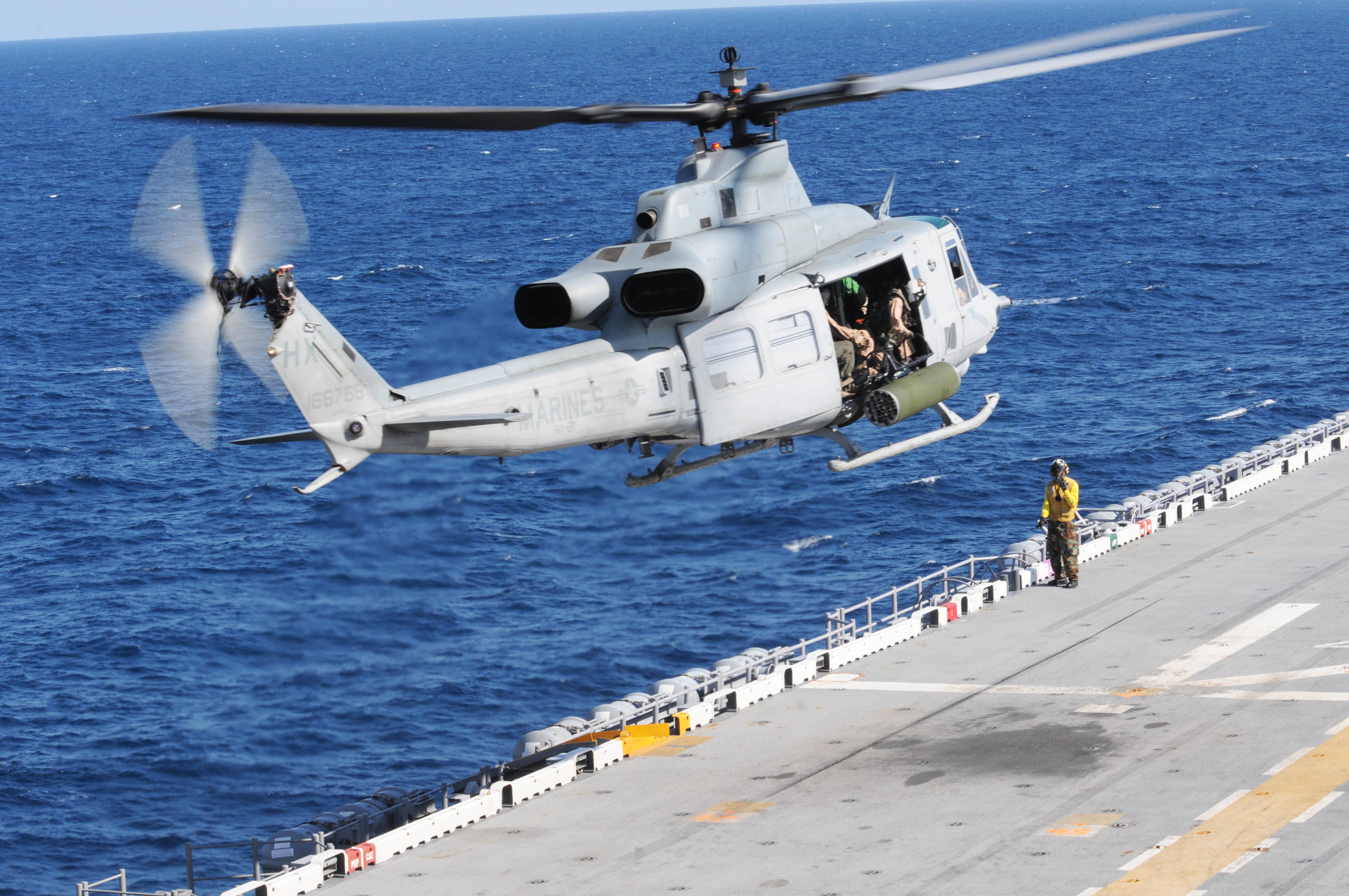
A rear view of a UH-1Y showing the twin engine exhausts

A UH-1Y firing Hydra 70 rockets, a GAU-21, and a GAU-17A

== Operational history ==
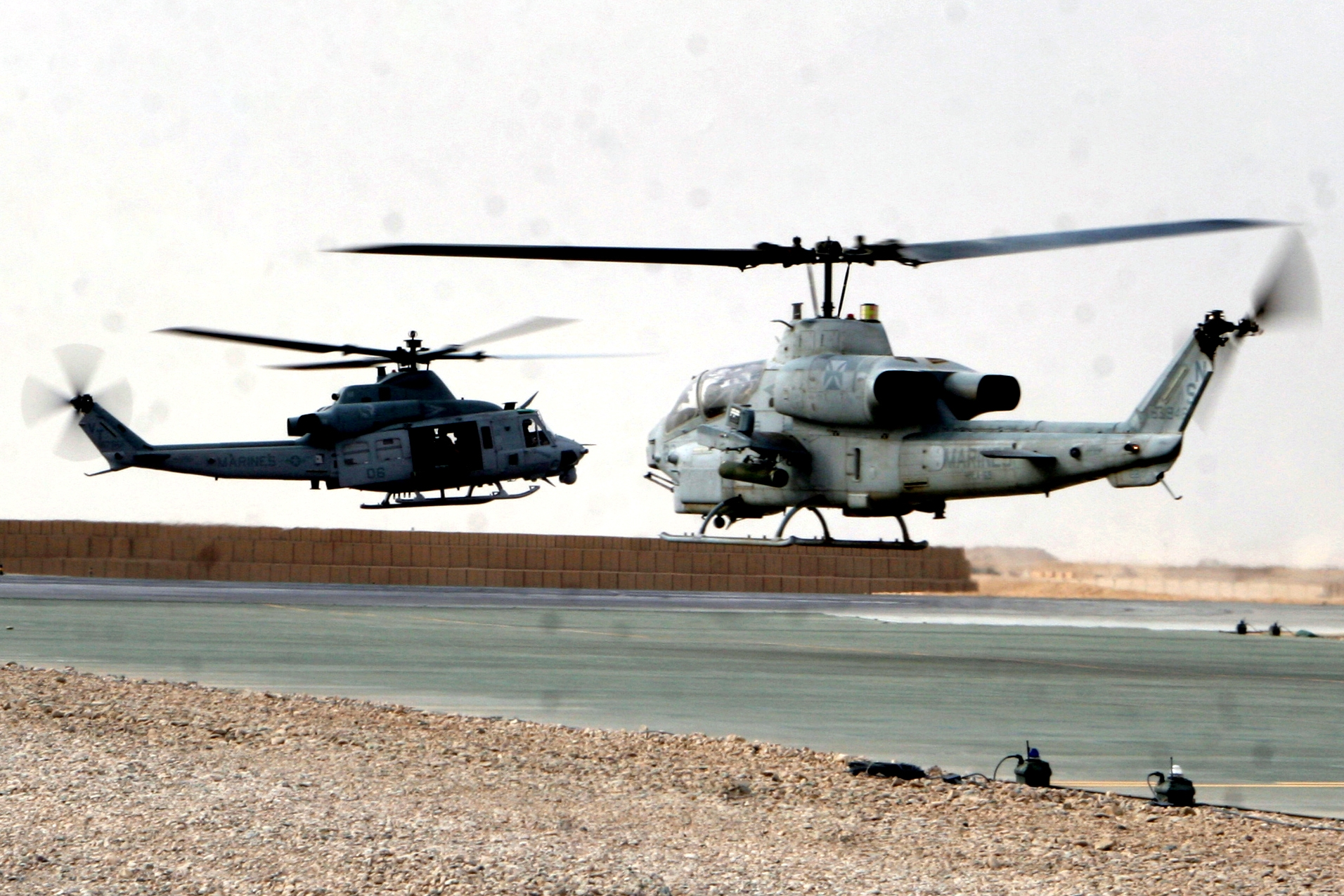
A UH-1Y from HMLA-367 and an AH-1W SuperCobra in Afghanistan, November 2009

The UH-1Y and AH-1Z completed their developmental testing in early 2006. During the first quarter of 2006 the UH-1Ys were transferred to the Operational Test Unit at NAS Patuxent River, where they began operational evaluation testing. In February 2008, the UH-1Y and AH-1Z began the second and final portion of testing.

In August 2008, the Marine Corps certified the UH-1Y as operationally capable. In January 2009, it was deployed for the first time as part of the aviation combat element of the 13th Marine Expeditionary Unit. In August 2014, the UH-1N Twin Huey was retired by the Marines, making the UH-1Y the Marine Corps' standard utility helicopter.

The first UH-1Ys arrived in Afghanistan in 2009. During the Taliban raid on Camp Bastion, USMC UH-1Ys and AH-1W SuperCobras provided air support while under fire from Taliban insurgents.

On 1 August, 2016, the 22nd Marine Expeditionary Unit used UH-1Ys and AH-1Ws in strikes against ISIL in Libya during the American intervention in Libya and the Battle of Sirte.

In October 2017, the Defense Security Cooperation Agency notified the United States Congress of the potential sale of 12 UH-1Ys and related systems and support to the Czech Republic for a cost of US$575 million. In December 2019, an order for eight UH-1Y helicopters was approved. The first Czech UH-1Y was delivered in 2023. On 23 July 2026, a Czech UH-1Y crashed with five occupants, with one dead and four injured.

In August and September 2026, UH-1Ys were used as overwatch in Marine boarding actions on suspected Los Choneros refueling vessels in the pacific.

== Operators ==
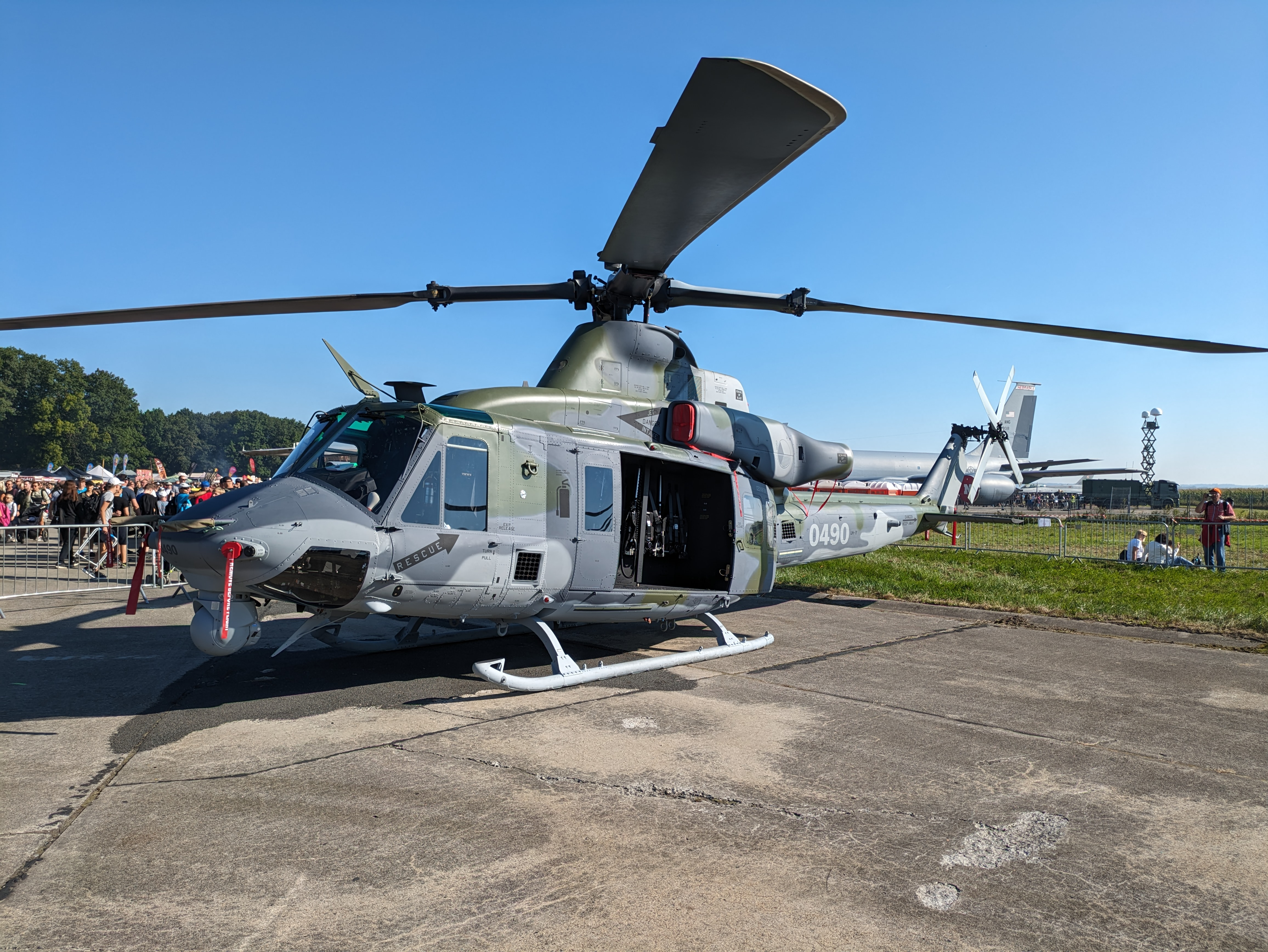
The first UH-1Y delivered to the Czech Air Force on public display, during NATO Days in Ostrava airshow in September 2023

Czech Republic

- Czech Air Force (8 delivered) Another two to be transferred at no cost via the Excess Defense Articles program.

United States

- United States Marine Corps
  - HMLA-167
  - HMLA-169
  - HMLA-267
  - HMLA-269
  - HMLA-367
  - HMLA-369
  - HMLA-469
  - HMLA-773
  - HMLAT-303

== Specifications ==
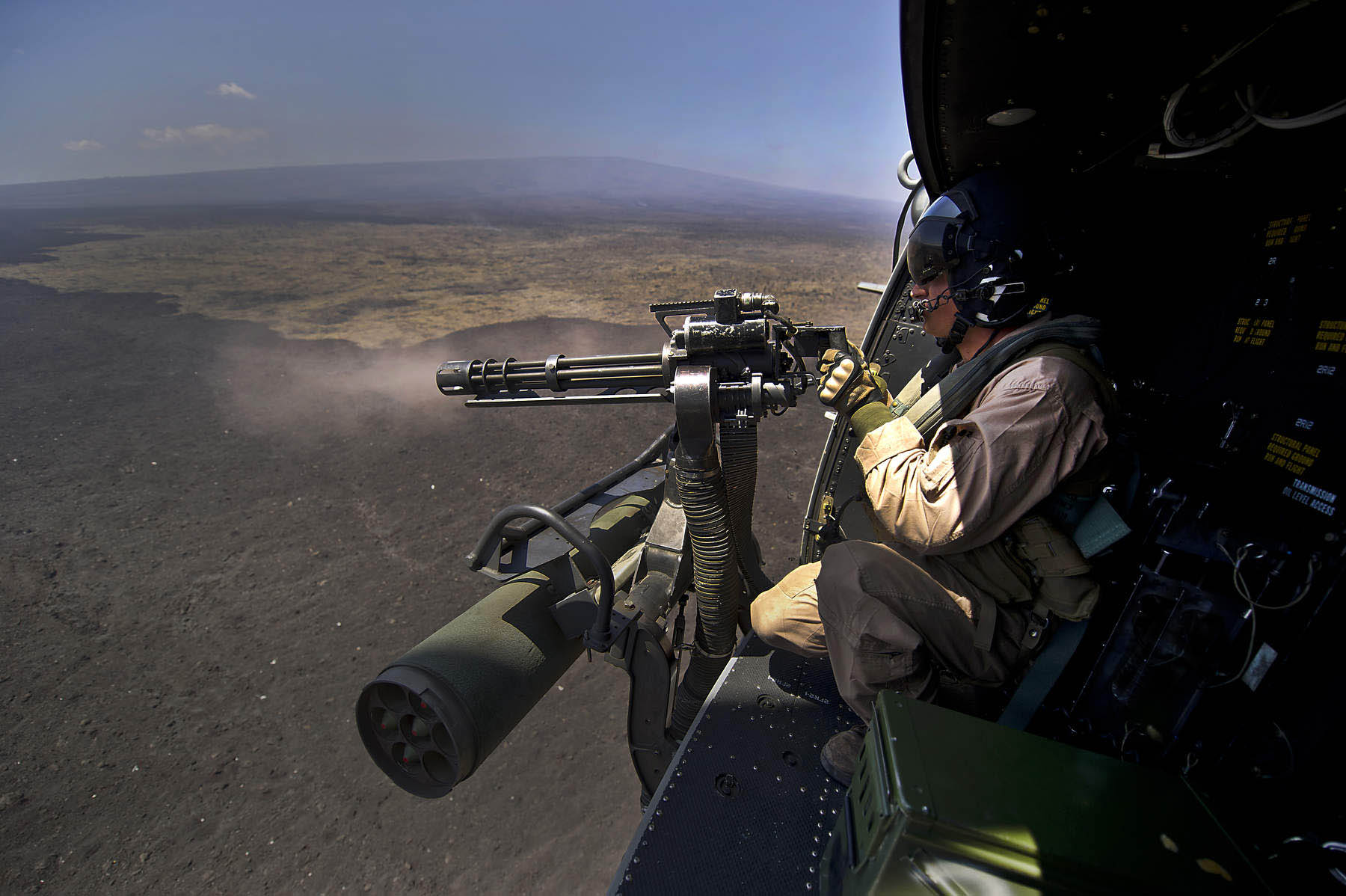
A minigun and Hydra rocket launcher on a UH-1Y

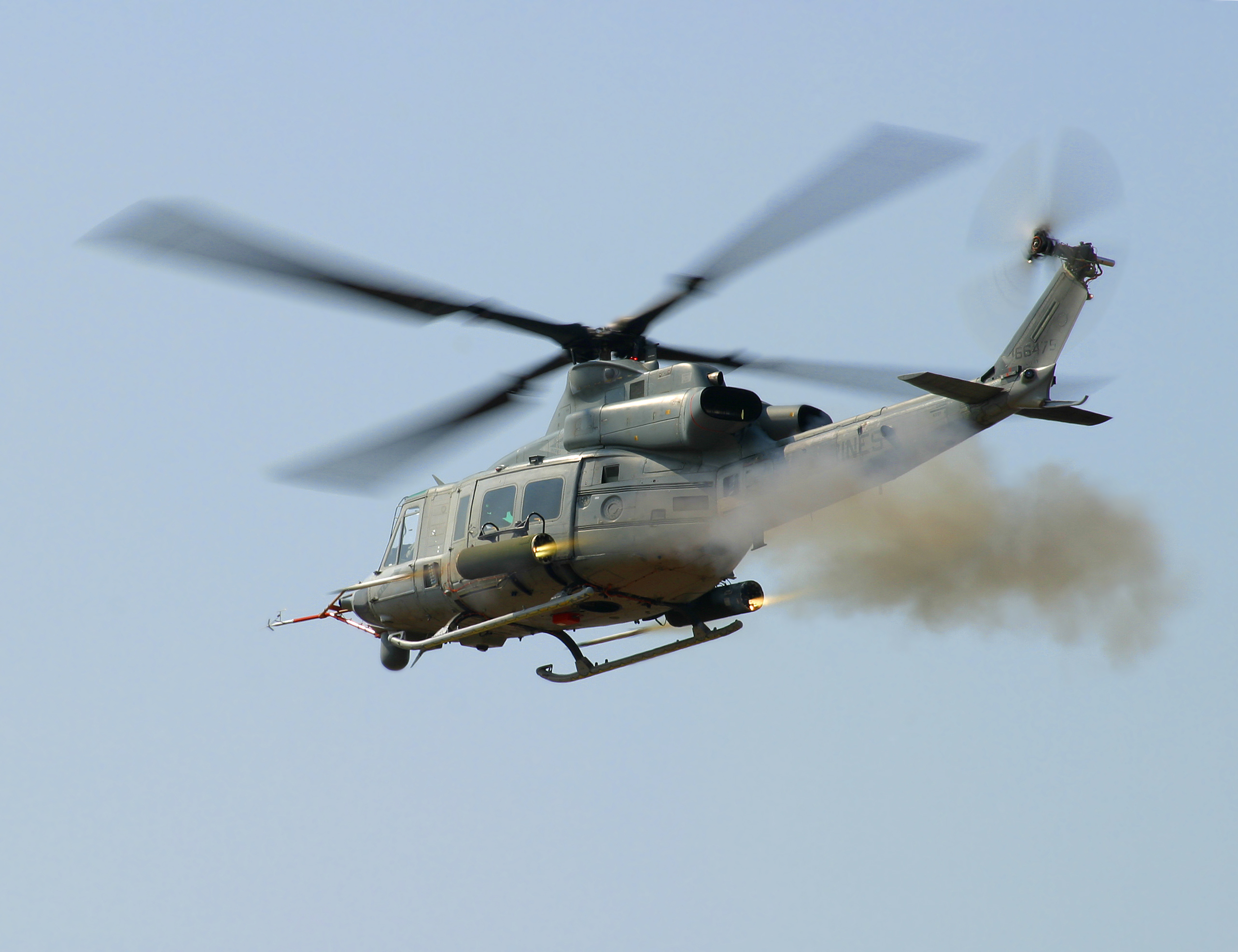
A UH-1Y firing rockets

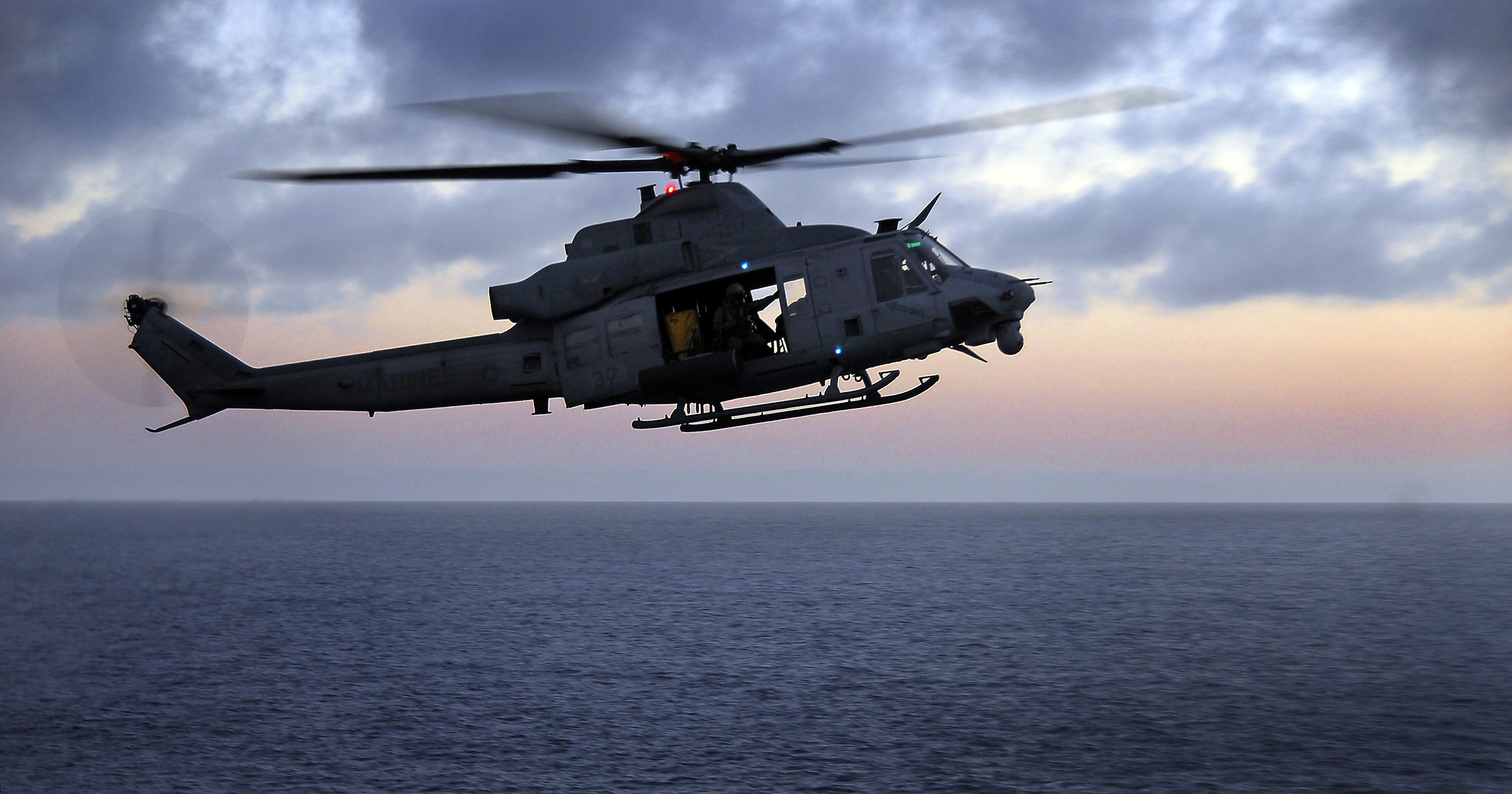
A UH-1Y

Data from Bell UH-1Y guide, International Directory of Civil Aircraft

General characteristics

- Crew: 2 (pilot and co-pilot)
- Capacity: 6,660 lb (3,021 kg) / up to ten crashworthy passenger seats / six litters / equivalent cargo
- Length: 58 ft 4 in (17.78 m)
- Height: 14 ft 7 in (4.45 m)
- Empty weight: 11,840 lb (5,371 kg)
- Max takeoff weight: 18,500 lb (8,391 kg)
- Powerplant: 2 × General Electric T700-GE-401C turboshaft, 1,828 shp (1,363 kW) each for 2 minutes 30 seconds

1,546 hp (1,153 kW) continuous

- Main rotor diameter: 48 ft 10 in (14.88 m)
- Main rotor area: 1,808 sq ft (168.0 m^{2})
- Blade section: Narramore

Performance

- Maximum speed: 164 kn (189 mph, 304 km/h)
- Cruise speed: 158 kn (182 mph, 293 km/h)
- Never exceed speed: 198 kn (228 mph, 367 km/h)
- Combat range: 130 nmi (150 mi, 240 km) with 2,182 lb (990 kg) payload
- Endurance: 3 hours 18 minutes
- Service ceiling: 20,000 ft (6,100 m) +
- Rate of climb: 2,520 ft/min (12.8 m/s)

Armament

- 2 external stations for 70 mm (2.75 in) Hydra 70 or APKWS II rockets
- 2 pintle mounts for 7.62×51 mm M240D machine guns, .50 in (12.7 mm) GAU-21 machine guns, or 7.62×51 mm NATO GAU-17/A Gatling guns

== See also ==
- U.S. helicopter armament subsystems
- List of active United States military aircraft
- United States Marine Corps Aviation

Related development

- Bell 212
- Bell 412
- Bell UH-1N Twin Huey
- Bell AH-1Z Viper
