= General Maxwell =

General Maxwell may refer to:

- Charles William Maxwell (1775–1848), British Army lieutenant general
- David W. Maxwell (fl. 1980s–2020s), U.S. Marine Corps major general
- Francis Aylmer Maxwell (1871–1917), British Army brigadier general
- John Maxwell (British Army officer) (1859–1929), British Army general
- Russell Maxwell (1890–1968), U.S. Army major general
- Thomas Maxwell (Jacobite) (d. 1693), Scottish-born French Army major general
- William Maxwell (Continental Army general) (1733–1796), Ulster-born Continental Army brigadier general

== See also ==
- Attorney General Maxwell (disambiguation)
