= Simone Wilkie =

Retired Australian Army officer

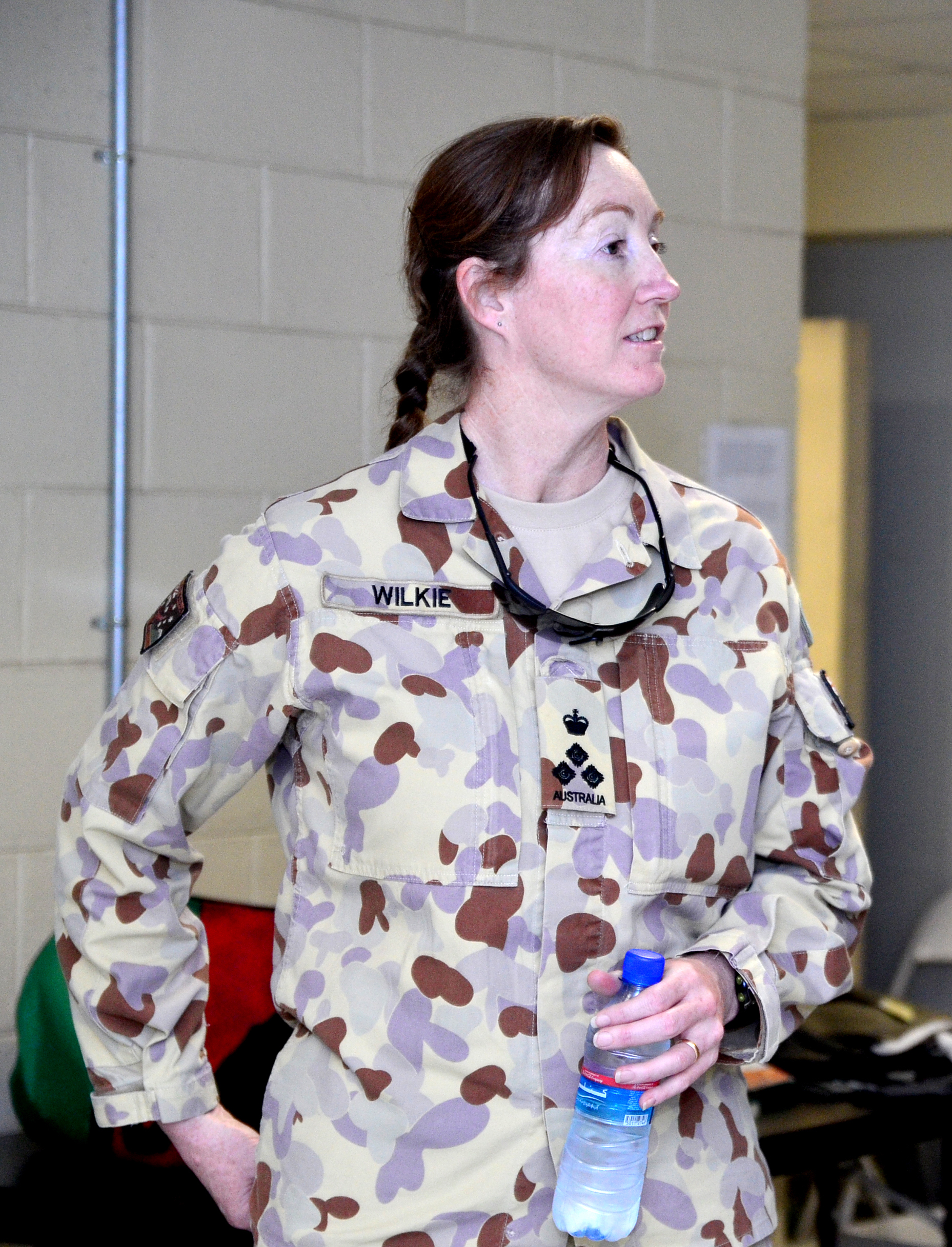
- Brigadier Wilkie in Afghanistan, August 2012
- Born: 1964 (age 61–62); Ballarat, Victoria
- Military career
- Allegiance: Australia
- Branch: Australian Army
- Service years: 1983–2018
- Rank: Major General
- Commands: Australian Defence College; Army Recruit Training Centre; Corps of Staff Cadets, Royal Military College, Duntroon; 136 Signal Squadron
- Conflicts: Cambodia (UNTAC); Iraq War; War in Afghanistan
- Awards: Officer of the Order of Australia; Commendation for Distinguished Service; Bronze Star Medal (United States)

Major General Simone Louise Wilkie, AO (née Burt, born 1964) is a retired Australian Army officer who was the Australian Deputy National Commander in the War in Afghanistan in 2011 and 2012. She was Assistant Chief of Staff to General David Petraeus during the Iraq War troop surge of 2007, and was the first female Commanding Officer of the Royal Military College, Duntroon and Commandant at the Army Recruit Training Centre at Kapooka. In March 2013 the Minister for Defence, Stephen Smith, announced her promotion to major general to take over as Commander of the Australian Defence College in July 2013.

== Early life and education ==
Simone Louise Burt, was educated at Ballarat Grammar School. She joined the Australian Army in 1983, and attended the Women's Royal Australian Army Corps (WRAAC) Officer Cadet School in Georges Heights, New South Wales. There were 32 women in her class. Opportunities for women in the Army were more restricted then, and on graduation she was commissioned and assigned to the Royal Australian Corps of Signals. She later recalled:

I didn’t actually pick signals. That’s what I was allocated. It wasn’t even one of my preferences. But in hindsight it was the best place for me to go and that’s where you know the captain who was my guidance officer said, "You know Simone, I think you should go here". And I’ve had lots of fantastic opportunities. Would I go there now? Possibly not, because I’m not a particularly technically orientated person. And now that there is other things open like Engineers I would have been interested in that… knowing that also has a technical bent to it!

Wilkie has a Bachelor of Social Science in Human Resource Management, a Graduate Diploma in Telecommunications Systems Management, a Graduate Diploma of Strategic Studies, and a Masters of Defence Studies.

== Military career ==
In Wilkie's early career she served as a platoon commander with the Army's Recruit Training Battalion, as an instructor at the Royal Military College, Duntroon, and as the ARA staff with the Army Reserve 140th Signal Squadron. In 1993, she served in Cambodia as Adjutant of the Australian Force Communication Unit with the United Nations Transitional Authority in Cambodia (UNTAC).

Wilkie commanded 136 Signal Squadron. She then became the first female commanding officer of the Royal Military College, Duntroon, and then the first female Commandant at the Army Recruit Training Centre at Kapooka. In 2007 she went to Iraq as Assistant Chief of staff of General David Petraeus's Multi-National Force during the Iraq War troop surge of 2007, working under the Chief of Staff, Major General John M. Paxton Jr. Petraeus's headquarters, which was made up of about 1,800 personnel, was split between the Embassy site in Baghdad and Camp Victory. Wilkie was in charge of many of the activities at the former, noting that:

if you haven’t worked with the American military, they have their own language. So I found it an incredibly steep take off to learn the American military language and the way they did their business inside an HQ, and then the idiosyncrasies of their Department of State and the culture between the two of them. I was sort of a go between in managing things. So the first month was a lot of different things coming at me but it was absolutely fascinating to see how a campaign actually is conducted at that level.

Wilkie was awarded the United States' Bronze Star Medal for her service in Iraq.

In 2008 Wilkie was appointed a Member of the Order of Australia in the Australia Day Honours "for exceptional performance of duty in command appointments within Training Command - Army". On promotion to brigadier in 2009 she became Director General of Training at Headquarters Forces Command at Victoria Barracks, Sydney, responsible for most of the Army's training.

In 2011 Wilkie became the Australian National Commander in Afghanistan. As such, she was responsible for the 1,500 Australian personnel serving with Australian and international forces in the combat zone. Her job also involved liaising with the commander of the International Security Assistance Force in Afghanistan, General John R. Allen. She was awarded the Commendation for Distinguished Service "for distinguished performance of duty in warlike operations as Assistant Commander - Afghanistan, Joint Task Force 633 on Operation Slipper from September 2011 to August 2012."

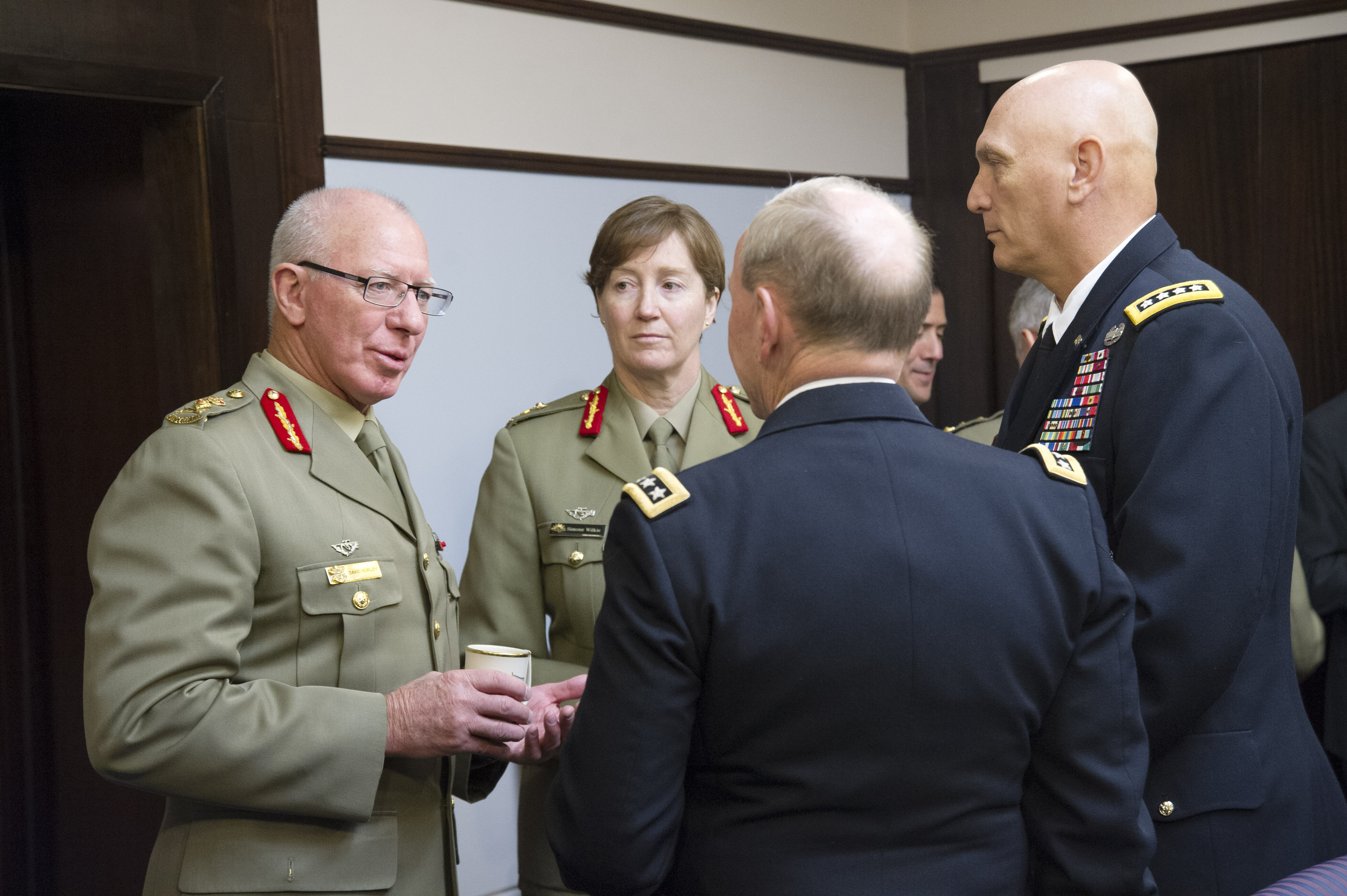
Major General Simone Wilkie, with General David Hurley on her right, speaking with General Martin E. Dempsey, and General Raymond T. Odierno; at National Defense University's Marshall Hall on Fort Lesley J. McNair in Washington D.C., Nov. 21, 2013

After returning from Afghanistan then Brigadier Wilkie was posted as the Chief of Staff to the Chief of Army (Lieutenant General David Morrison) at Army Headquarters in Canberra. In March 2013 the Minister for Defence, Stephen Smith, announced that she would be promoted to major general and will take over as the Commander of the Australian Defence College in Canberra, commanding the Australian Defence Force Academy, Australian Command and Staff College and the Centre for Defence and Strategic Studies. There had only been five women of two-star rank in the Australian Defence Force (ADF).

As a result of an Australian Government review into the structure of the Australian Department of Defence, Wilkie was appointed as the Head of Joint Enablers in July 2015. In this position she retained her previous role and added responsibility for ADF Joint Health, Joint Logistics and Cadet and Reserve Policy.

In late 2014 Wilkie was appointed to the Commission of the Australian Football League, the governing body of Australia's football code. She is also a patron of the ADF Women's Australian Rules Association and the ADF Hockey Association, and chairs the ADF Sports Council. Wilkie retired from the Australian Army in 2018.

== Personal life ==
Wilkie married Andrew Wilkie, a fellow army officer in 1991. They divorced in 2003. She is currently married and lists her leisure activities as home renovation, and playing field hockey and golf.

Asked if she had any advice for young women, Wilkie said: "If you want to serve your country, your gender is not an issue."

== Honours and awards ==
Ribbon	Description	Reference
	Officer of the Order of Australia (AO)	13 June 2016, "For distinguished service to Defence Education and Training as Director General Training-Army and Commander Australian Defence College."
	Member of the Order of Australia (AM)	26 January 2008
	Commendation for Distinguished Service	10 June 2013 "For distinguished performance of duty in warlike operations as Assistant Commander - Afghanistan, Joint Task Force 633 on Operation SLIPPER from September 2011 to August 2012"
	Australian Active Service Medal	
	Afghanistan Medal	
	Iraq Medal	
	Defence Force Service Medal with 3 clasps	(30-34 Years Service)
	Australian Defence Medal	
	United Nations Medal for UNTAC (United Nations)	with numeral device 2
	Bronze Star (United States)	
	NATO Medal for ISAF (Northern Atlantic Treaty Organisation)	

== Notes ==
Military offices
Preceded by Major General Craig Orme	Commander, Australian Defence College; 2013–2018	Succeeded by Major General Mick Ryan
