= Marine Corps Installations Command =

Major command of the U.S. Marine Corps

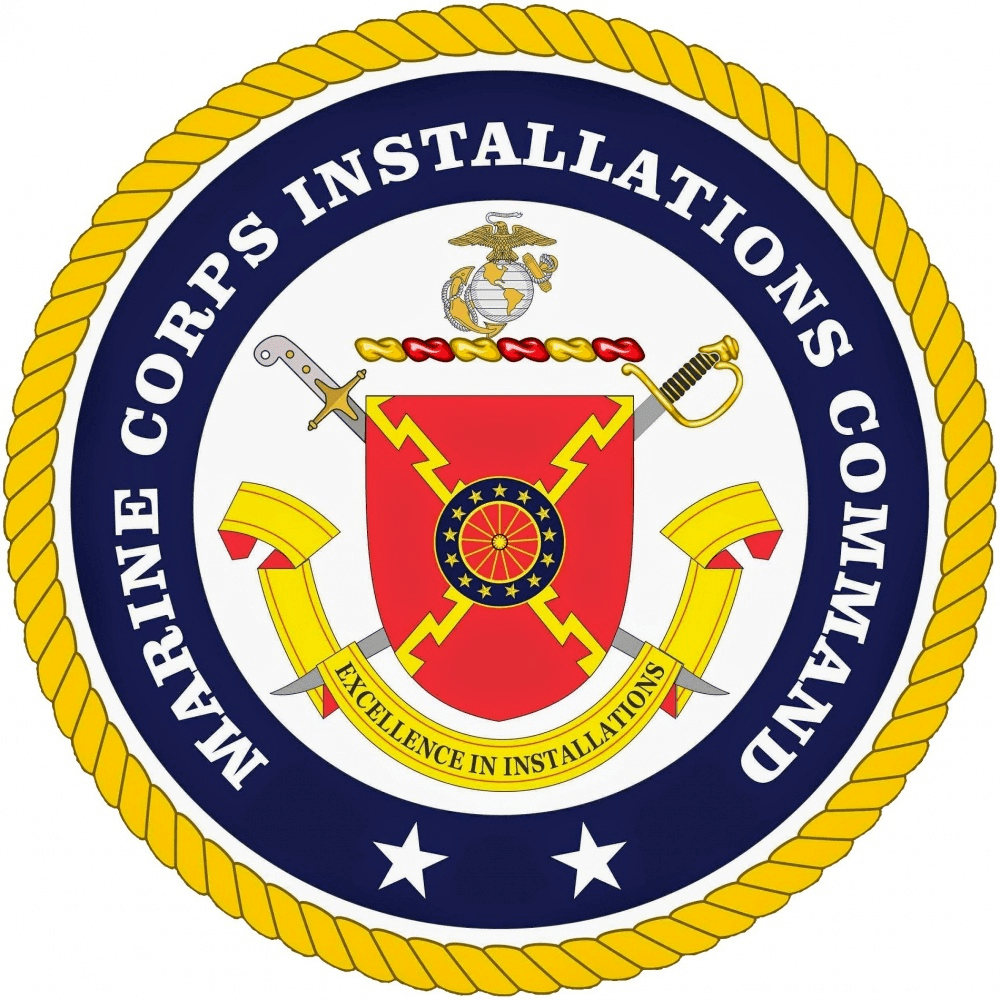
- Logo of the Marine Corps Installations Command, part of the U.S. Marine Corps.
- Country: United States
- Branch: United States Marine Corps
- Part of: Headquarters Marine Corps
- Website: www.mcicom.marines.mil

Commanders
- Commander: Maj. Gen. Jason G. Woodworth
- Deputy Commander: Vacant
- Sergeant Major: Sgt. Maj. Jason B. Hammock

The Marine Corps Installations Command (MCICOM) was created on October 1, 2011 to oversee U.S. Marine Corps installations (including the installations' regional commanders) through direct oversight, policy creation and coordination, and resource prioritization. MCICOM is currently commanded by Major General Jason G. Woodworth.

According to the Marine Corps, the Command was established to help "[exercise] command and control of Marine Corps installations via regional commanders in order to provide oversight, direction, and coordination of installation services and to optimize support to the Operating Forces, tenants, and activities. For installations under the command and control of the Commanding General of Marine Corps Training and Education Command (TECOM), MCICOM will only provide installation support.”

== Subordinate Commands ==
MCICOM's subordinate commands include:

- Marine Corps Installations East (MCIEAST) - Operates command and provides support for Marine Corps Installations on the East Coast of the U.S. to include: Marine Corps Air Facility (MCAF) Quantico, Marine Corps Air Station (MCAS) Beaufort, MCAS Cherry Point, MCAS New River, Marine Corps Base (MCB) Camp Lejeune, Marine Corps Logistics Base (MCLB) Albany, and Deployment Processing Command (DPC) East (in Camp LeJeune). The Commanding General of MCIEAST is Brigadier General Julian D. Alford.
- Marine Corps Installations West (MCIWEST) / Marine Corps Base (MCB) Camp Pendleton - Operates command over and provides support for five Marine Corps Bases in the Southwest of the U.S. to include: MCB Camp Pendleton, Marine Corps Air Station (MCAS) Camp Pendleton, MCAS Miramar, MCAS Yuma, and Marine Corps Logistics Base (MCLB) Barstow. The Commanding General for MCIWEST-MCB Camp Pendleton is Brigadier General Kevin J. Killea.
- Marine Corps Installations Pacific (MCIPAC) - Operates command over and provides support for Marine Corps Installations in Japan, Korea and Hawaii to include Marine Corps Base (MCB), Camp Smedley D. Butler (MCB Camp Butler); MCB Hawaii; Marine Corps Air Station (MCAS) Iwakuni; MCAS Futenma; Combined Arms Training Center(CATC) Camp Fuji; and Camp Mujuk. The Commanding General for MCIPAC is Brigadier General Paul J. Rock, Jr..
- Marine Corps Base Quantico (MCB Quantico) - The Commander of MCB Quantico is Colonel William C. Bentley III.

In addition, MCICOM provides installation support to those installations under the command and control of the Marine Corps Training and Education Command (TECOM) to include: Marine Corps Recruit Depot (MCRD) San Diego and MCRD Parris Island.

== List of commanders ==
- MajGen Vincent A. Coglianese, May 2017
- MajGen Edward D. Banta, July 9, 2019
- BGen Daniel B. Conley, July 8, 2021
- BGen Andrew M. Niebel, June 30, 2022 (acting)
- MajGen David W. Maxwell, July 15, 2022
- MajGen Jason G. Woodworth,
