= Juan G. Ayala =

United States Marine Corps general

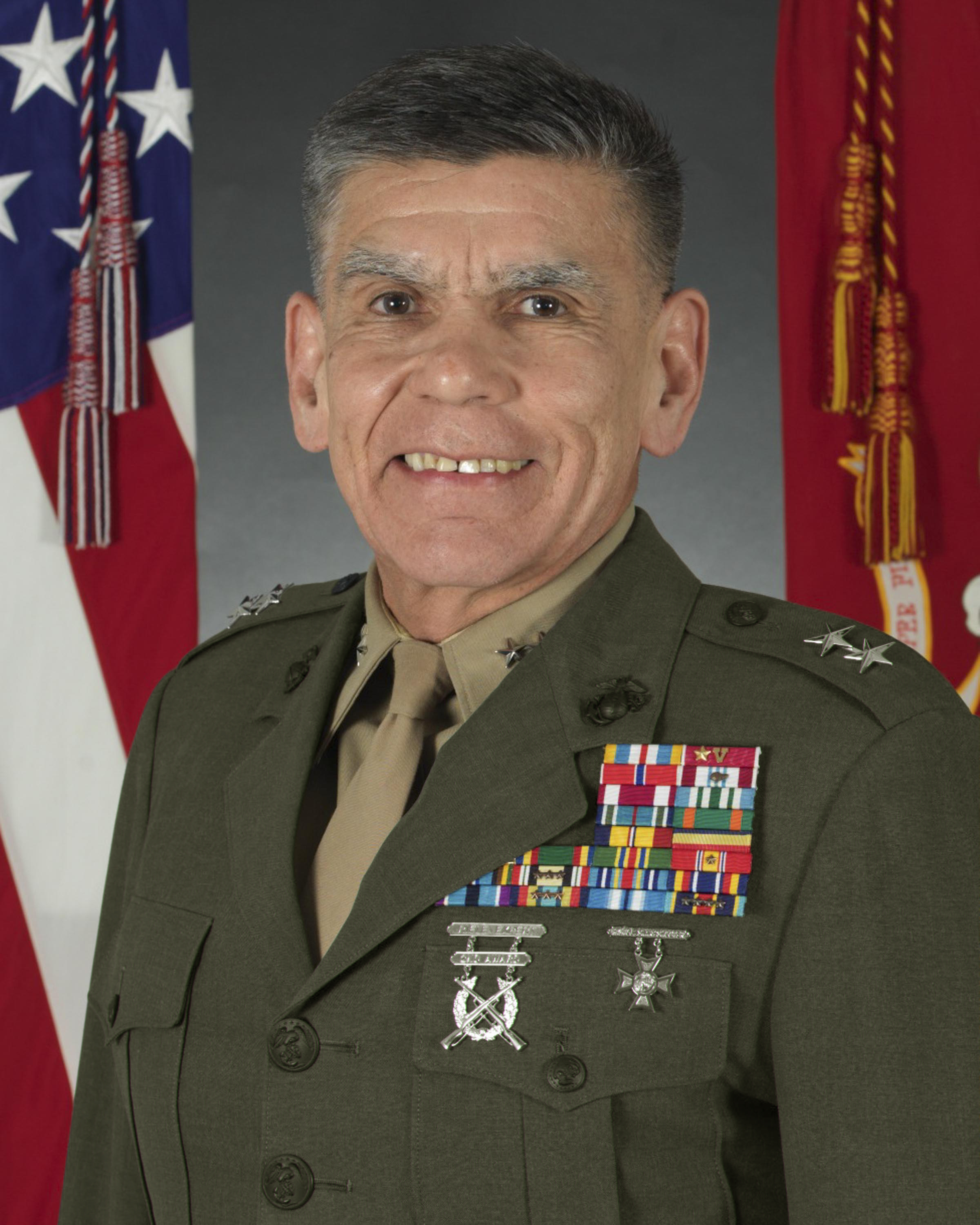
- Born: August 26, 1956 (age 70); El Paso County, Texas, U.S.
- Military career
- Allegiance: United States of America
- Branch: United States Marine Corps
- Service years: 1979–2015
- Rank: Major General
- Commands: Marine Corps Installations Command, ADC Installations & Logistics Facilities and Services Division; 2nd Marine Logistics Group; Marine Wing Support Group 37; Marine Wing Support Squadron 271
- Conflicts: Iraq War

Juan Guadalupe Ayala (born August 26, 1956) is a retired two-star general in the U.S. Marine Corps and the former commander of the Marine Corps Installations Command (MCICOM) and Assistant Deputy Commandant, Installations & Logistics (ADC, I&L). Prior to assuming command of MCICOM, Major General Ayala served as Inspector General of the Marine Corps (IGMC). During his time in the Marine Corps, he served four tours in Iraq in support of Operation Iraqi Freedom and in Kuwait as part of Operation Enduring Freedom.

== Early life and education ==
Ayala is a native of El Paso, Texas. During the 1950s, his father and mother emigrated from Mexico to Texas, where his father Victor Ayala worked at Fort Bliss in El Paso, Texas. His father later opened a restaurant called Victor's Café, which was famous for its menudo, a traditional Mexican soup.

After graduating from Coronado High School, Ayala attended the University of Texas at El Paso (UTEP), where he graduated with a bachelor's degree in business administration in 1979. Upon graduation, he joined the U.S. Marine Corps, with a commission as a second lieutenant. He soon married Diane Ayala, whom he met while they were attending UTEP.

Ayala later earned an MBA from Campbell University and an MA in national security and strategic studies from the Naval War College. He also attended the Amphibious Warfare School, and the Army Command and General Staff College.

== Career ==
Ayala spent the initial years of his Marine Corps career in Okinawa, Japan, first serving at Camp Butler, and later at Camp McTureous. In 1983, he was assigned to Camp Pendleton, California, serving three years with the 1st Marine Division and three years with the 1st Force Service Support Group.

In 1990, Ayala was stationed at Fort Bliss Texas, where he was assigned to the new Joint Task Force 6 for Counter Drug Operations. During his time there, the Task Force completed over 300 counterdrug interdictions and support missions along the southwest U.S. border. Ayala was then stationed in Cherry Point, North Carolina as part of the 2d Marine Aircraft Wing, where he held several positions, including commanding officer of Marine Wing Support Squadron 271, and the J4 Operations Officer supporting Operation Sea Signal (JTF-160) at Guantanamo Bay Cuba (refugee operations).

In 2001, he was assigned to Headquarters, United States European Command in Stuttgart, Germany as its humanitarian assistance branch chief. In this position, Ayala supported the U.S.’s Strategic Engagement policies through Humanitarian Assistance Program coordination for Eastern Europe, the Balkans, the Baltics, the Caucasus, Russia, and Africa.

One year later, Ayala became the 3d Marine Corps Aircraft Wing’s Assistant Chief of Staff G-4. In this role, he deployed in support of Operation Enduring Freedom (OEF) and Operation Iraqi Freedom (OIF). He then became the commanding officer of Marine Wing Support Group 37, which sent him back to Iraq. In 2005, Ayala returned to Camp Pendleton, California to serve as the chief of staff of the 1st Marine Logistics Group. From January 2006 to the beginning of 2007, he deployed to Iraq for a third tour, this time as an embedded advisor to the 1st Iraqi Army Division in Habbaniyah, Al Anbar province. There, he took part in counterinsurgency and combat operations in Habbaniyah, Fallujah, Nasser wa’ Salaam and Ar Ramadi.

In 2008, then Colonel Ayala was promoted to brigadier general and became the commanding general of 2d Marine Logistics Group at Camp Lejeune, North Carolina (May 2008 to June 2010). During this assignment he again deployed to Iraq with his Group. Ayala was the last MLG commanding general to serve in Iraq as the Marine Corps role in Iraq ended shortly thereafter.

In 2011, Ayala served as the chief of staff of United States Southern Command, during which time he was promoted to major general. Prior to his appointment as Commander of MCICOM and ADC I&L, Ayala served as inspector general (IG) of the Marine Corps.

General Ayala's retirement ceremony was held at Fort Bliss, in Texas, in October 2015. His retirement effective date was 1 November 2015. After leaving the Marine Corps, Ayala was hired by the City of San Antonio in Texas as director of their Office of Military & Veteran Affairs.

== Awards and decorations ==
=== Awards ===
According to his military biography, while Ayala was in Command “his units [...] received the following recognition: Marine Corps Aviation Association's Jim Hatch Award for the 1998 Marine Wing Support Squadron (MWSS) of the Year (MWSS 271) and, the 2005 James McGuire Award for Exceptional Achievement (Security Battalion, Marine Wing Support Group 37). [In addition], he received the 2007 Excellence in Military Service Award from The League of United Latin American Citizens.”
