= Thomas Weidley =

U.S. Marine Corps general

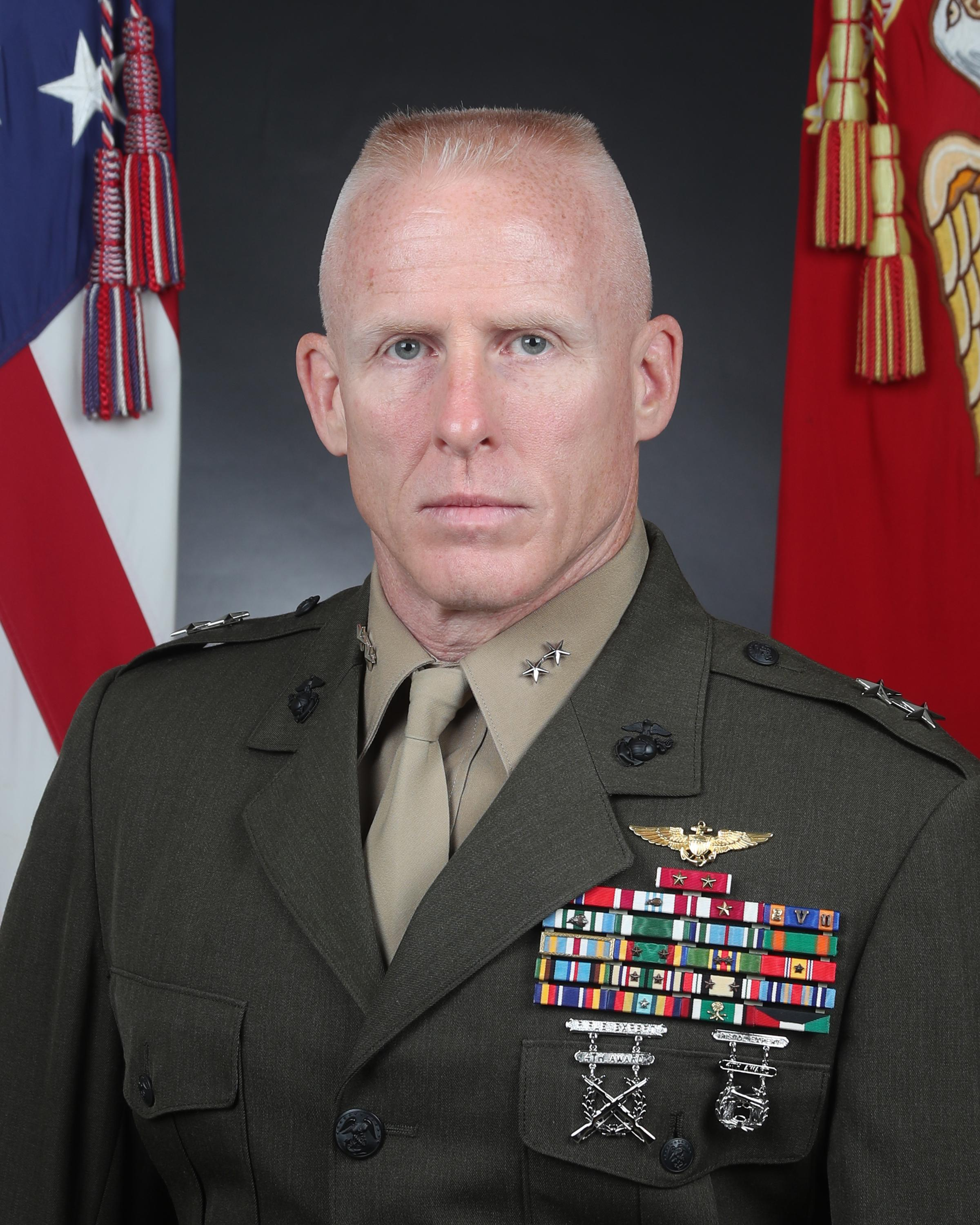
- Official portrait, 2019
- Born: Lima, Pennsylvania, U.S.
- Military career
- Allegiance: United States
- Branch: United States Marine Corps
- Service years: 1987-2021
- Rank: Major General
- Commands: 1st Marine Aircraft Wing; Marine Corps Installations East; Marine Corps University

Thomas D. Weidley is a United States Marine Corps major general who most recently served as the Assistant Chief of Staff for Strategic Planning and Policy of the United Nations Command, ROK/US Combined Forces Command, and United States Forces Korea. Previously, he served as the Commander of the 1st Marine Aircraft Wing.

Born in Lima, Pennsylvania, Weidley earned a B.S. degree in mechanical engineering from Ohio Northern University in 1987. After flight training, he was designated a naval aviator in July 1989. Weidley later received an M.A. degree in national security and strategic studies from the Naval War College in June 2004.

In November 2021, Weidley became the chief operating officer at the engineering aviation company Capewell.

Military offices
Preceded by ???	Chief of Staff of the Combined Joint Task Force – Operation Inherent Resolve; 2014–2015	Succeeded by ???
Preceded by Robert F. Castellvi	Commanding General of Marine Corps Installations East; 2015–2017	Succeeded by Michael L. Scalise
Preceded by Russell A. Sanborn	Commander of the 1st Marine Aircraft Wing; 2017–2019	Succeeded by Christopher A. McPhillips
Preceded by James W. Lukeman	Assistant Chief of Staff for Strategic Planning and Policy of the United Nations Command, ROK/US Combined Forces Command, and United States Forces Korea; 2019–2021	Succeeded by Robert Sofge
