= Electoral results for the Division of Clark =

Australian division election results

This is a list of electoral results for the Division of Clark in Australian federal elections from the division's creation in 2019 until the present.

== Members ==
| Member | Party | Term |
|---|---|---|
| Andrew Wilkie | Independent | 2019–present |

== Election results ==
=== Elections in the 2020s ===
==== 2025 ====
2025 Australian federal election: Clark
| Party | Candidate | Votes | % | ±% |
|---|---|---|---|---|
| Independent | Andrew Wilkie | | | |
| Greens | Janet Shelley | | | |
| Liberal | Marilena Di Florio | | | |
| Labor | Heidi Heck | | | |
| One Nation | Cathy Griggs | | | |
| Total formal votes | | | | |
| Informal votes | | | | |
| Turnout | | | | |

==== 2022 ====
2022 Australian federal election: Clark
| Party | Candidate | Votes | % | ±% |
|---|---|---|---|---|
| Independent | Andrew Wilkie | 30,005 | 45.54 | −4.51 |
| Labor | Simon Davis | 12,364 | 18.76 | −1.46 |
| Liberal | Will Coats | 10,441 | 15.85 | −1.52 |
| Greens | Janet Shelley | 8,861 | 13.45 | +3.88 |
| One Nation | Michelle Cameron | 1,715 | 2.60 | +2.60 |
| United Australia | Sandra Galloway | 941 | 1.43 | −1.36 |
| Animal Justice | Casey Davies | 828 | 1.26 | +1.26 |
| Liberal Democrats | Ian Ramsden | 739 | 1.12 | +1.12 |
| Total formal votes | | 65,894 | 95.75 | −1.81 |
| Informal votes | | 2,924 | 4.25 | +1.81 |
| Turnout | | 68,818 | 92.13 | −1.51 |
Notional two-party-preferred count
| Labor | Simon Davis | 44,309 | 67.24 | +1.07 |
| Liberal | Will Coats | 21,585 | 32.76 | −1.07 |
Two-candidate-preferred result
| Independent | Andrew Wilkie | 46,668 | 70.82 | −1.30 |
| Labor | Simon Davis | 19,226 | 29.18 | +1.30 |
| Independent hold | | Swing | −1.30 | |

Alluvial diagram for preference flows in the seat of Clark in the 2022 federal election. indicates at what stage the winning candidate had over 50% of the votes and was declared the winner.

=== Elections in the 2010s ===
==== 2019 ====
2019 Australian federal election: Clark
| Party | Candidate | Votes | % | ±% |
|---|---|---|---|---|
| Independent | Andrew Wilkie | 33,761 | 50.05 | +6.02 |
| Labor | Ben McGregor | 13,641 | 20.22 | −2.80 |
| Liberal | Amanda-Sue Markham | 11,719 | 17.37 | −2.55 |
| Greens | Juniper Shaw | 6,458 | 9.57 | −1.04 |
| United Australia | Jim Starkey | 1,882 | 2.79 | +2.79 |
| Total formal votes | | 67,461 | 97.56 | +0.48 |
| Informal votes | | 1,689 | 2.44 | −0.48 |
| Turnout | | 69,150 | 93.64 | +0.45 |
Notional two-party-preferred count
| Labor | Ben McGregor | 44,642 | 66.17 | +0.84 |
| Liberal | Amanda-Sue Markham | 22,819 | 33.83 | −0.84 |
Two-candidate-preferred result
| Independent | Andrew Wilkie | 48,653 | 72.12 | +4.35 |
| Labor | Ben McGregor | 18,808 | 27.88 | −4.35 |
| Independent hold | | Swing | +4.35 | |
