= Robert F. Castellvi =

US Marine Corps general

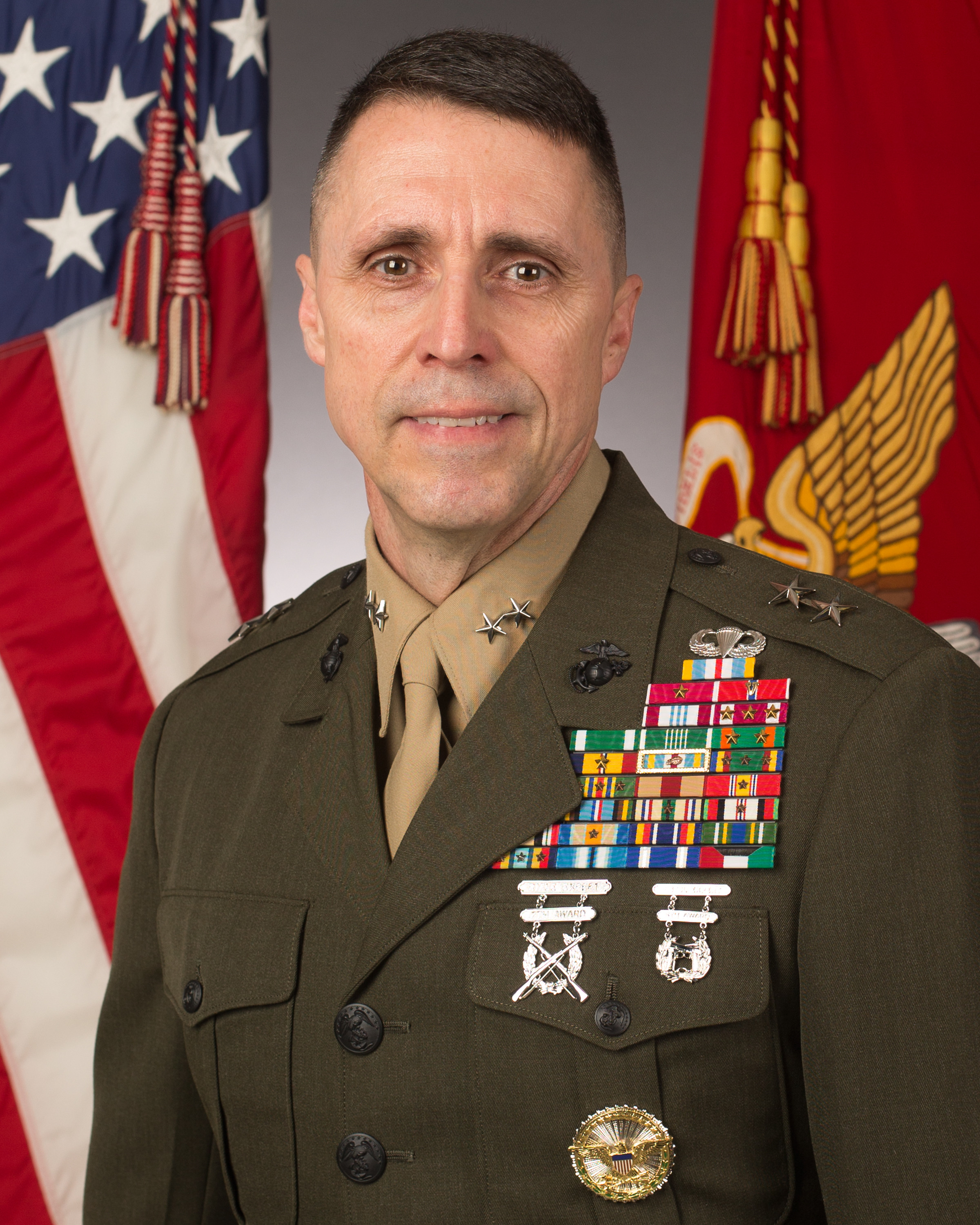
- Alma mater: University of Illinois; Capitol College (MS); National Defense University (MS); Marine Corps University (MS); Industrial College of the Armed Forces; School of Advanced Warfighting; Marine Command and General Staff College
- Military career
- Allegiance: United States of America
- Branch: United States Marine Corps
- Service years: 1984-2022
- Rank: Major general
- Units: Task Force Leatherneck; 15th Marine Expeditionary Unit; 24th Marine Expeditionary Unit
- Commands: Inspector General of the Marine Corps; 1st Marine Division; 2nd Marine Expeditionary Brigade; Marine Corps Installations East
- Conflicts: Operation Earnest Will; Operation Desert Storm; Operation Enduring Freedom; Operation Inherent Resolve
- Awards: 1993 recipient of the Leftwich Trophy for leadership Combat Action Ribbon; Defense Superior Service Medal; Legion of Merit with one Gold Star; Bronze Star Medal

Robert F. Castellvi is a retired United States Marine Corps major general who served for 38 years on active duty. In his last assignment on active duty, he served as Assistant Deputy Commandant for Plans, Policies, and Operations at Headquarters Marine Corps. Since his retirement from the Marine Corps in May 2022, he has served as a Defense Consultant / Senior Military Advisor in the Middle East.

== Early life and education ==
Castellvi was born in Miami, Florida, the youngest son of Cuban exiles, and was raised in Chicago, Illinois. He attended the University of Illinois on a Naval Reserve Officers Training Corps (NROTC) scholarship and earned his Marine Corps commission following his graduation, cum laude, with a Bachelor of Science degree in finance.

In addition to his Marine Corps entry-level training at The Basic School (Officer Basic Course and Infantry Officer Course), he is a graduate of the U.S. Army Infantry Officer Advanced Course, the U.S. Army Airborne School, the U.S. Army Air Assault School, the Marine Corps Command and Staff College, the School of Advanced Warfighting, and the Eisenhower School for National Security and Resource Strategy (formerly the Industrial College of the Armed Forces).

Castellvi also holds master's degrees from Marine Corps University, National Defense University, and Capitol College (now Capitol Technology University). He is a Level IV Joint Qualified Officer.

== Military career ==
Castellvi was commissioned into the Marine Corps via the NROTC program in May 1984. As an infantry officer, he served in the Fleet Marine Force in all three Marine Expeditionary Forces.

Castellvi has ten operational deployments overseas, including six combat tours in four conflicts: Panama (Operation Just Cause), Somalia (Operation Restore Hope), Iraq (Operations Desert Storm, Iraqi Freedom, and Inherent Resolve), and Afghanistan (Operation Enduring Freedom). His first deployment in a combat zone was as an Infantry Platoon Commander for Operation Earnest Will in the Arabian Gulf with the 24th Marine Expeditionary Unit in 1985, and his last deployment was in Iraq in 2014 for Operation Inherent Resolve as the deputy commanding general for operations for the Combined Joint Force Land Component Command - Iraq.

=== General Officer assignments ===
On 22 March 2017, then-Secretary of Defense Jim Mattis nominated Robert F. Castellvi to the rank of Major General while he was deputy commanding general of the II Marine Expeditionary Force (dual-hatted as 2 MEB commander). He was confirmed by the Senate on 1 May 2017. He was the commander of Marine Corps Installations East from 12 July 2013 to 31 July 2015, and was succeeded by Major General Thomas D. Weidley. He was also a director of the Manpower Management Division.

He was formerly the commanding officer of the 2nd Marine Expeditionary Brigade and then the 1st Marine Division, succeeding Eric M. Smith. He served as commanding general of the 1st Marines from 6 July 2018 to 22 September 2020, passing the baton to Major General Roger B. Turner Jr. While serving as the commanding general of the 1st Marine Division, Castellvi relieved Lt. Col. Francisco Zavala, the commanding officer of the 1st Reconnaissance Battalion. Castellvi relieved Zavala on 7 May 2019 for "loss of trust and confidence" in the commander's ability to lead the battalion.

=== 15th Marine Expeditionary Unit AAV mishap ===
On July 30, 2020, an assault amphibious vehicle (AAV) mishap off the coast of Southern California on July 30, 2020, resulted in the drowning deaths of 8 Marines and a Navy corpsman in a "preventable" accident. The Command Investigation by I Marine Expeditionary Force (I MEF) into the AAV mishap was completed in March 2021; it "revealed a confluence of human and mechanical failures caused the sinking of the mishap AAV, and contributed to a delayed rescue effort."

At the time of the mishap, Castellvi was the Commanding General of the 1st Marine Division and not in operational command of the AAV or the BLT. On 1 May 2021, on orders from David H. Berger, Commandant of the Marine Corps, an investigation determined that Castellvi "bears some responsibiity" for the lack of training that lead to the drownings.

As a result of the second investigation, on 1 June 2021, Castellvi was formally counseled by the Commandant of the Marine Corps, removing him from consideration for promotion to the rank of Lieutenant General. All Marines below him in the chain of command received some level of administrative discipline. He was reassigned from his duties as Inspector General of the Marine Corps to serve as Assistant Deputy Commandant for Plans, Policies, and Operations. In 2022, following the results of a third investigation, conducted by the Department of the Navy, the Secretary of the Navy Carlos Del Toro issued formal administrative censure to five additional senior Marine Corps and Navy officers for their roles in the AAV incident. The three investigations into the incident "revealed a 'chain of failure' at nearly every level of command."

=== Final post and retirement ===
After being relieved from his position as inspector general in June 2021, Castellvi became the Assistant Deputy Commandant for Plans, Policies, and Operations (ADC PP&O).

He retired from active duty in May 2022 after over 38 years of active duty. Castellvi has served in the private sector as a Defense Consultant / Senior Military Advisor in the Middle East.

== Awards and decorations ==
Major General Robert F. Castellvi is the recipient of the following awards:

Parachutist Badge
Rifle Expert Badge (7th award)

- 1993 recipient of the Leftwich Trophy for leadership
- Combat Action Ribbon with one Gold Star
- Defense Superior Service Medal
- Legion of Merit with one Gold Star
- Bronze Star Medal with V device
- Meritorious Service Medal with three Gold Stars
- Marine Corps Commendation Medal
- Army Commendation Medal
- US Marine Corps Achievement Medal with two Gold Stars

Military offices
Preceded by Thomas A. Gorry	Commanding General of Marine Corps Installations East; 2013–2015	Succeeded by Thomas D. Weidley
Preceded by Richard L. Simcock II	Commanding General of the 2nd Marine Expeditionary Brigade; 2015–2018	Succeeded by Stephen M. Neary
Preceded by Eric M. Smith	Commanding General of the 1st Marine Division; 2018–2020	Succeeded by Roger B. Turner Jr.
Preceded by James W. Lukeman	Inspector General of the Marine Corps; 2020–2021	Succeeded by Carl E. Shelton Jr. Acting
Preceded by David J. Furness	Assistant Deputy Commandant for Plans, Policies and Operations of the United States Marine Corps; 2021–2022	Succeeded by ???
