= School of Advanced Warfighting =

Military training institution in the United States of America

School of Advanced Warfighting (SAW)
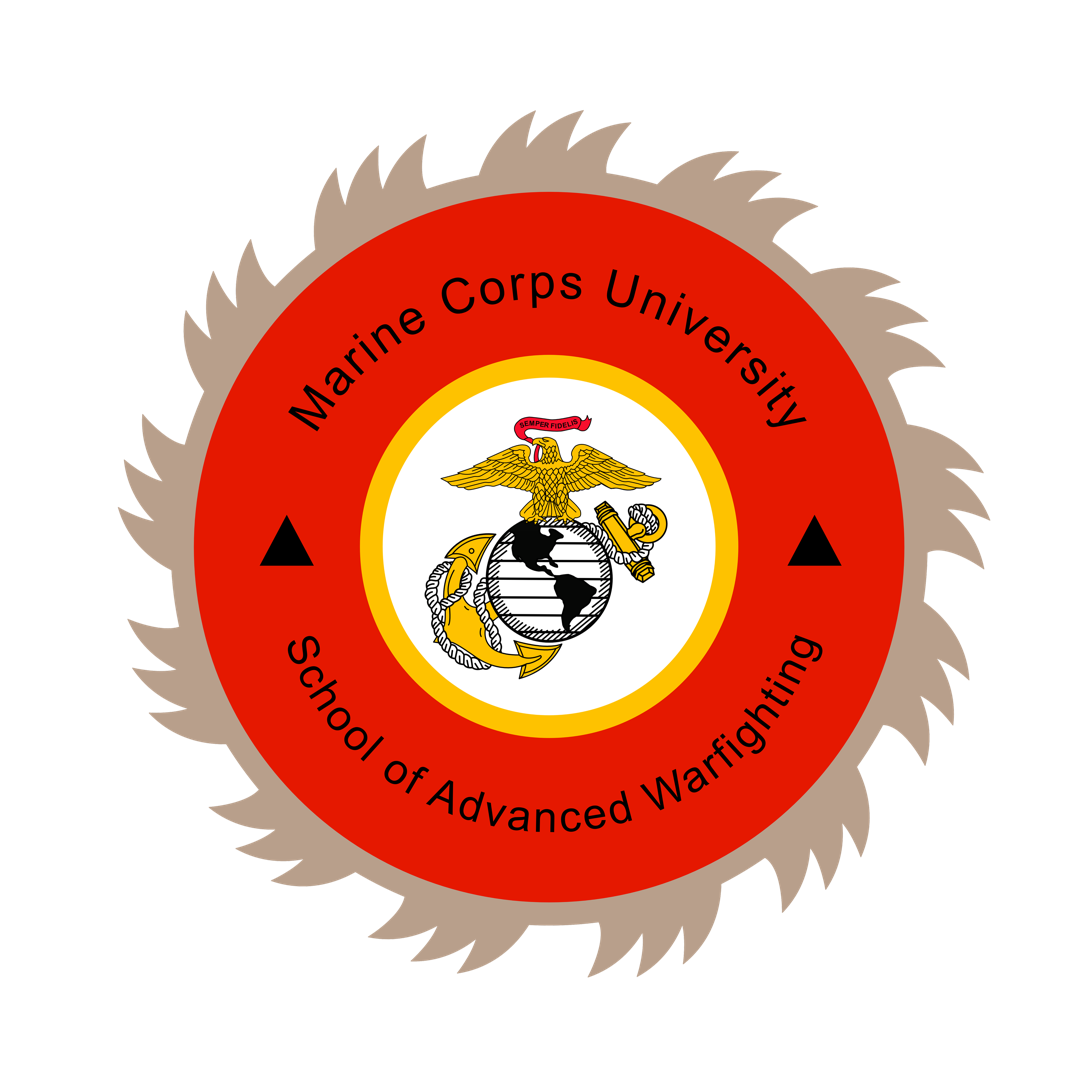
- Active: 1990–present
- Country: United States
- Allegiance: Federal
- Branch: United States Marine Corps
- Garrison/HQ: MCB Quantico, Virginia
- Motto: Sapere Aude

Commanders
- Current commander: Colonel Brian Donlon, Class of '17

The School of Advanced Warfighting (SAW) in the United States Marine Corps is an Advanced Intermediate Level School (A-ILS) that produces officers qualified to fill high-impact service and joint planning billets. The curriculum features numerous case studies, multiple planning exercises, extensive staff rides and a consideration of future war. Graduates earn the secondary Military Occupational Specialty (MOS) 0505 Marine Air Ground Task Force (MAGTF) planner and a master's degree in Operational Studies. SAW was designed to develop field grade officers for the Marine Corps most difficult operational and planning challenges.

SAW is located in Warner Hall aboard Marine Corps Base Quantico, Virginia. Warner Hall is named in honor of Senator John Warner.

== History ==
The School of Advanced Warfighting (SAW) can trace its roots back to the “maneuver warfare movement,” the period leading up to and including General Alfred M. Gray Jr.'s tenure as the 29th Commandant, which reached its zenith with the publishing of Fleet Marine Force Manual 1 Warfighting in 1989. General Gray's vision for a “world-class educational institution for the study of war and the profession of arms” within the Marine Corps Command and Staff College (CSC) would consist of the Art of War Studies program, which later became the Marine Corps War College, and a new second year of CSC which developed into SAW. During this same time, these courses, along with Amphibious Warfare School, the predecessor to the Expeditionary Warfare School, were organized into the Marine Corps University.

Aligned to the U.S. Army's School of Advanced Military Studies, the plan called for a new course to be offered as a follow-on year to the Marine Corps Command and Staff College (CSC). The goal was to enable selected students the opportunity to gain a greater appreciation of military art from an academic perspective. Gray, having recently read Stormtroop Tactics: Innovation in the German Army, 1914-1918, tapped its author, Bruce Gudmundsson, a Marine Corps Reserve captain who was working as a case study writer at the John F. Kennedy School of Government, to develop the initial course. The result was a graduate-level military education program designed to amplify and complement the warfighting foundations provided during the first year of the CSC curriculum while specifically focusing on the link between warfighting and combat development.

SAW formally began on July 10, 1990, with an initial class composed of twelve Marine Corps officers and two officers from the U.S. Army and the U.S. Air Force, respectively. These students, selected by the Director of CSC, volunteered for the additional year of school beyond their CSC graduation. Lieutenant Colonel James Eicher assumed the office of Dean of SAW under the CSC Director, and Dr Bradley J. Meyer, a German military historian, was brought on as the additional professor beside Dr Gudmundsson.

After thirty years, SAW separated from CSC to form an independent school, broadened the prerequisite requirement to attend to any intermediate-level resident or non-resident school, opened the application process to international military students and U.S. government agencies, and increased class size from sixteen to twenty-six students. The program has changed from a course to train combat developers into a course to develop staff planners for service in critical billets throughout the operating forces and supporting establishments.

== Mission ==
The School of Advanced Warfighting (SAW) develops lead planners and future commanders with the will and intellect to design and execute joint campaigns and naval expeditionary operations.

It educates officers who will serve as staff planners in key billets throughout the operating forces and supporting establishments with the following program goals.

- Formulate solutions to complex problems and apply operational art in an uncertain geostrategic security environment.
- Employ knowledge of the operational level of war, the art of command, and ethical behavior in war fighting.
- Quickly and critically assess a situation, determine the essence of a problem, fashion a suitable response, and concisely communicate the conclusion in oral and written forms.
- Demonstrate the competence, confidence, character, and creativity required to plan, lead, and command at high level service, joint, and combined headquarters.
- Design and plan adaptive concepts to meet current and future challenges.

It provides advanced intermediate-level school, and graduate-level professional military education for selected field grade officers who have completed the Marine Corps or sister service command and staff college course. The course develops complex problem-solving and decision-making skills that can be used to improve the warfighting capabilities of an organization at the operational level of war.

The curriculum is administered through a 48-week resident program, consisting of 42 credit hours in the following core courses:

- Operational Art
- Operational Planning
- Changing Character of Conflict

Graduates are awarded a Master of Operational Studies degree by the President of the Marine Corps University. The degree is accredited by the Southern Association of Colleges and Schools.

== Cates Award ==
The General Clifton B. Cates Award is presented in honor of the 19th Commandant of the Marine Corps by the Navy League to the two SAW students whose sustained demonstration of problem-solving capabilities far exceed their military experience and are considered most outstanding as exhibited by written assignments, participation in practical exercises, and in the exchange of ideas.

== Previous directors ==
- Lieutenant Colonel James Eicher, USMC, AY 1991, as "Dean of SAW"
- Colonel John Goodman, USMC, AY 1992–1993, as "Head of SAW"
- Colonel Joseph Crookston, USMC, AY 1994–1996
- Colonel Rex Estilow, USMC, AY 1997–1998
- Lieutenant Colonel John Bacon, USMC, AY 1999–2002, Class of 1992
- Colonel John Koenig, USMC, AY 2003–2004, Class of 1997
- Colonel Christopher Owens, USMC, AY 2005, Class of 1997
- Colonel Jerome Driscoll, USMC, AY 2006–2007, Class of 2001
- Colonel Christopher Woodbridge, USMC, AY 2008, Class of 2001
- Colonel James Vohr, USMC, AY 2009, Class of 2002
- Colonel Tracy King, USMC, AY 2010, Class of 2003
- Colonel David Casey, USMC, AY 2011, Class of 2002
- Colonel Michael Morris, USMC, AY 2012–2015, Class of 2001
- Colonel Wayne Sinclair, USMC, AY 2016–2018, Class of 2004
- Colonel James Fullwood Jr, USMC, AY 2019–2020, Class of 2007
- Colonel Gregory Poland, USMC, AY 2021–2024, Class of 2010
- Colonel Cornelius Hickey, USMC, AY 2025–2026, Class of 2014

== Notable graduates ==
- General John Kelly, USMC (Ret.), Class of 1992 and former White House Chief of Staff
- General Kenneth McKenzie Jr., USMC (Ret.), Class of 1993
- General David Berger, USMC (Ret.), Class of 1996 and 38th Commandant of the Marine Corps
- General Wayne Eyre, Canadian Army (Ret.), Class of 2003 and 19th Chief of the Defence Staff (Canada)
- Lieutenant General Steven Hummer, USMC (Ret.), Class of 1992
- Lieutenant General Mark Brilakis, USMC (Ret.), Class of 1996
- Lieutenant General Jon Davis, USMC (Ret.), Class of 1996
- Lieutenant General Robert Mood, Norwegian Army (Ret.), Class of 1996
- Lieutenant General Carl Mundy III, USMC (Ret.), Class of 1999
- Lieutenant General Rick Burr, Australian Army (Ret.), Class of 1999 and 40th Chief of Army (Australia)
- Lieutenant General George Smith Jr., USMC (Ret.), Class of 2000
- Lieutenant General Jocelyn Paul, Canadian Army (Ret.), Class of 2005 and 7th Commander of the Canadian Army
- Lieutenant General Rodolfo Sganga, Italian Army, Class of 2006 and current Chief of Staff of Allied Joint Force Command Naples
- Major General Charles Gurganus, USMC (Ret.), Class of 1992
- Major General Dave Gawn, Australian Army (Ret.), Class of 1997 and 5th Chief of Army (New Zealand)
- Major General Odd Pedersen, Norwegian Army (Ret.), Class of 1997 and 2nd Commander, Norwegian Cyber Defence Force
- Major General Robert Castellvi, USMC (Ret.), Class of 1999
- Major General Chris Field, Australian Army (Ret.), Class of 2002
- Major General William Mullen, USMC (Ret.), Class of 2002
- Major General Mick Ryan, Australian Army (Ret.), Class of 2003 and 11th Commander, Australian Defence College
- Major General Ash Collingburn, Australian Army, Class of 2011 and current Commander, 1st Division (Australia)
- Major General Frode Ommundsen, Norwegian Army, Class of 2012

== See also ==
- School of Advanced Military Studies
- School of Advanced Air and Space Studies
- Marine Corps War College
