= Richard Menhinick =

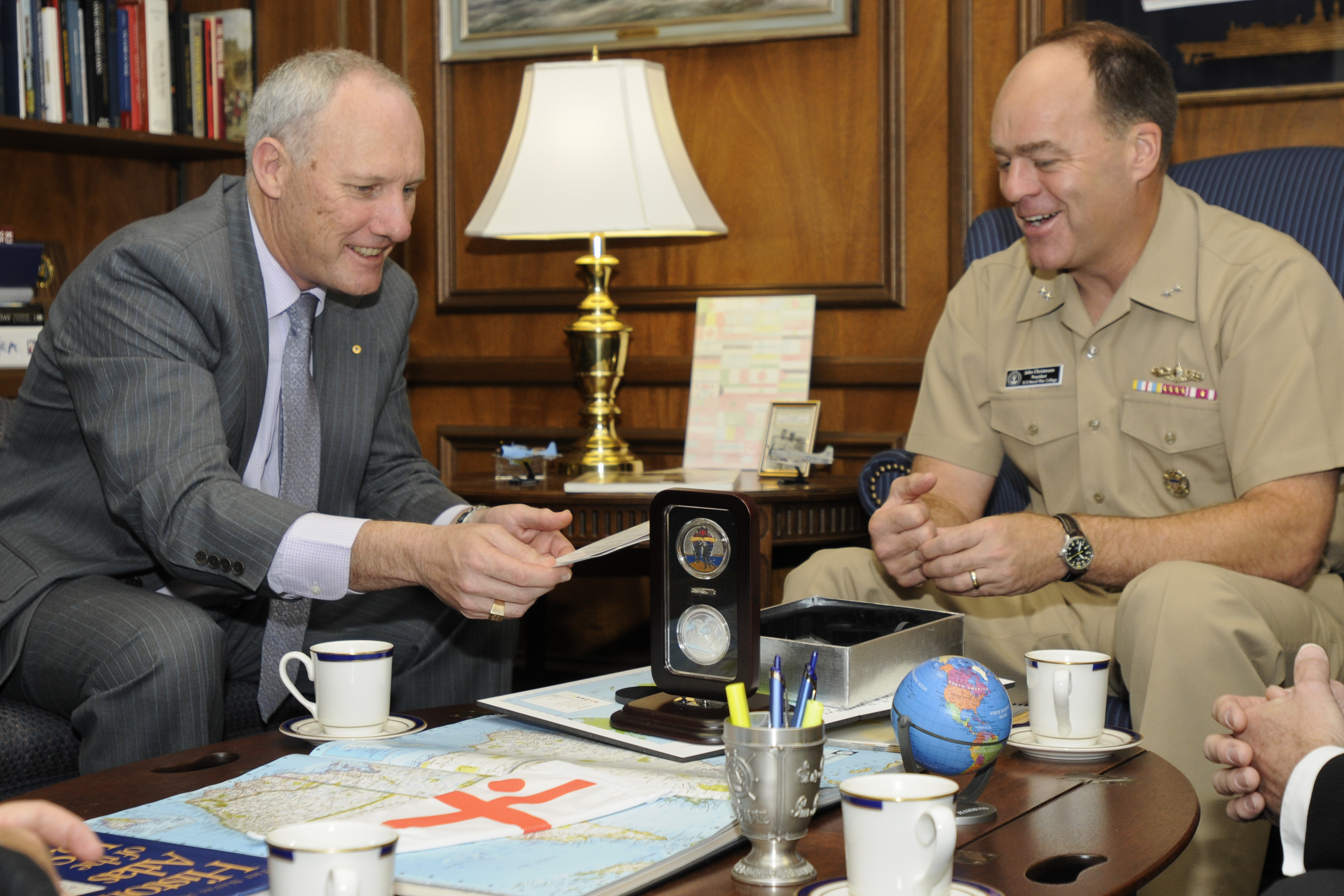
- Menhinick (left)
- Born: Belfast, England
- Military career
- Allegiance: Australia
- Branch: Royal Australian Navy
- Service years: 1976–2016
- Rank: Commodore
- Commands: Australian Command and Staff College; Task Force 150; Director General Navy Transformation & Innovation; HMAS Anzac; Sea Power Centre; HMAS Warramunga
- Conflicts: Gulf War; War in Afghanistan
- Awards: Member of the Order of Australia; Conspicuous Service Cross; Commendation for Distinguished Service

Commodore Richard Temple Menhinick AM, CSC is a retired senior officer of the Royal Australian Navy (RAN).

== Naval career ==
He joined the Royal Australian Navy in 1976, finishing his training in 1980 he underwent training as a Principal Warfare Officer and in 1983 was posted as the naval Aide-de-Camp to the Governor of Tasmania, Sir James Plimsoll. Menhinick went on to serve as exchange officer with the Royal Navy on board HMS Cardiff.

Menhinick served as the commanding officer of HMAS Anzac, HMAS Warramunga and served as the executive officer of HMAS Hobart.

He was serving as the Commandant of the Australian Command and Staff College until 2012 when he handed over to Brigadier Peter Gates.

== Honours and awards ==

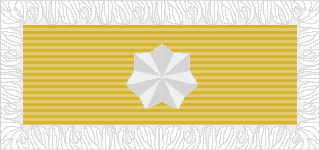

Member of the Order of Australia (AM)	26 January 2012
Conspicuous Service Cross (CSC)	26 January 2000
Commendation for Distinguished Service	
Australian Active Service Medal	
Afghanistan Medal	
Australian Service Medal	
Defence Force Service Medal with 4 Rosette's	for 35–39 years of service
Australian Defence Medal	
Kuwait Liberation Medal	(Saudi Arabia)
Meritorious Unit Citation with Federation Star	For HMAS Brisbane during the Gulf War
