= Attorney General Maxwell =

Attorney General Maxwell may refer to:

- Augustus Maxwell (1820–1903), Attorney General of Florida
- Edwin Maxwell (politician) (1825–1903), Attorney General of West Virginia
- Maxwell Hendry Maxwell-Anderson, Attorney General of Gibraltar

== See also ==
- General Maxwell (disambiguation)
