= Robert Sofge =

U.S. Marine Corps general

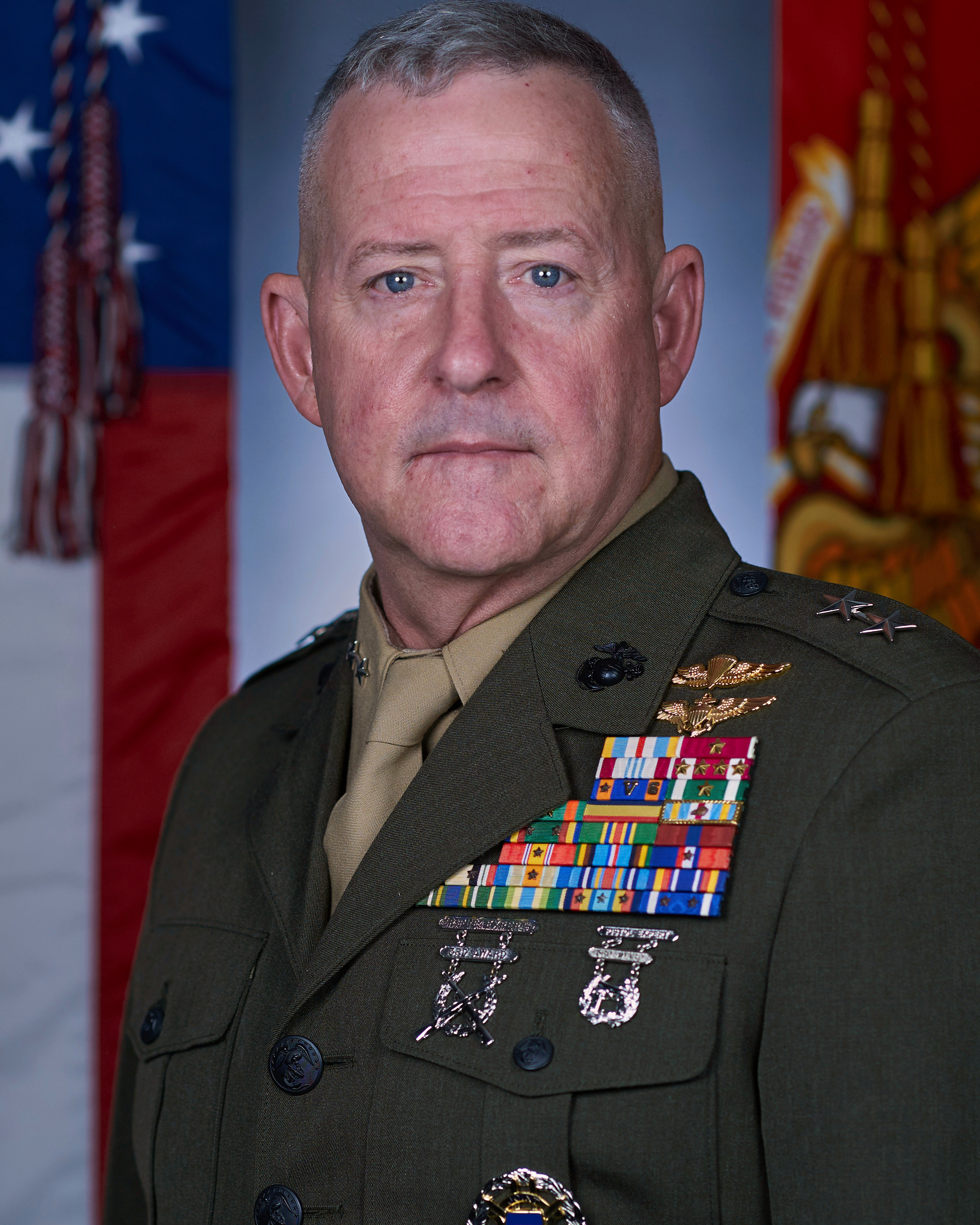
- Official portrait, 2023
- Born: New Orleans, Louisiana, U.S.
- Alma mater: United States Naval Academy (Bachelor of Political science); Touro University (MBA); United States Army War College (Master of Strategic Studies)
- Military career
- Allegiance: United States
- Branch: United States Marine Corps
- Service years: 1982–2025
- Rank: Major General
- Nickname: G-Man
- Commands: United States Marine Corps Forces Europe and Africa; Marine Aircraft Group 14; VMA-311
- Conflicts: Kosovo war Iraq war Operation Inherent Resolve

Robert B. Sofge Jr. is a United States Marine Corps major general who most recently served as the commanding general of United States Marine Corps Forces Europe and Africa from 2023 to 2025. He served as the assistant chief of staff for strategic planning and policy of the United Nations Command, ROK/US Combined Forces Command, and United States Forces Korea. He previously served as the deputy commander of United States Marine Corps Forces, Pacific.

== Awards and decorations ==
Sofges' decorations and medals include:

Navy and Marine Corps Parachutist Insignia
Naval Aviator Badge
Defense Superior Service Medal with one bronze oak leaf cluster		Legion of Merit	Defense Meritorious Service Medal
Meritorious Service Medal with four gold award stars	Air Medal with Combat "V", two gold award numerals and bronze Strike/Flight numeral 6	Navy Commendation Medal with Combat V and award star	Good Conduct Medal
Navy Achievement Medal with gold award star	Joint Meritorious Unit Award with oak leaf cluster	Navy Unit Commendation with two bronze service stars	Navy Meritorious Unit Commendation with three service stars
National Defense Service Medal with service star	Armed Forces Expeditionary Medal	Korea Defense Service Medal	Afghanistan Campaign Medal with two service stars
Inherent Resolve Campaign Medal with service star	Global War on Terrorism Service Medal	Kosovo Campaign Medal with service star	Armed Forces Service Medal
United States Navy Presidential Unit Citation ribbon	NATO Medal for service with Yugoslavia with two service stars	Sea Service Deployment Ribbon with seven service stars	Global War on Terrorism Expeditionary Medal
Rifle Expert Badge		Pistol Expert Badge	

Military offices
Preceded by Brian W. Cavanaugh	Deputy Commander of United States Marine Corps Forces, Pacific; 2018–2021	Succeeded by Joseph R. Clearfield
Preceded by Thomas Weidley	Assistant Chief of Staff for Strategic Planning and Policy of the United Nations Command, ROK/US Combined Forces Command, and United States Forces Korea; 2021–2023	Succeeded by Brian N. Wolford
Preceded by Tracy W. King	Commander of United States Marine Corps Forces Europe and Africa; 2023–2025	Succeeded by Daniel L. Shipley
