= Dion English =

U.S. Navy admiral

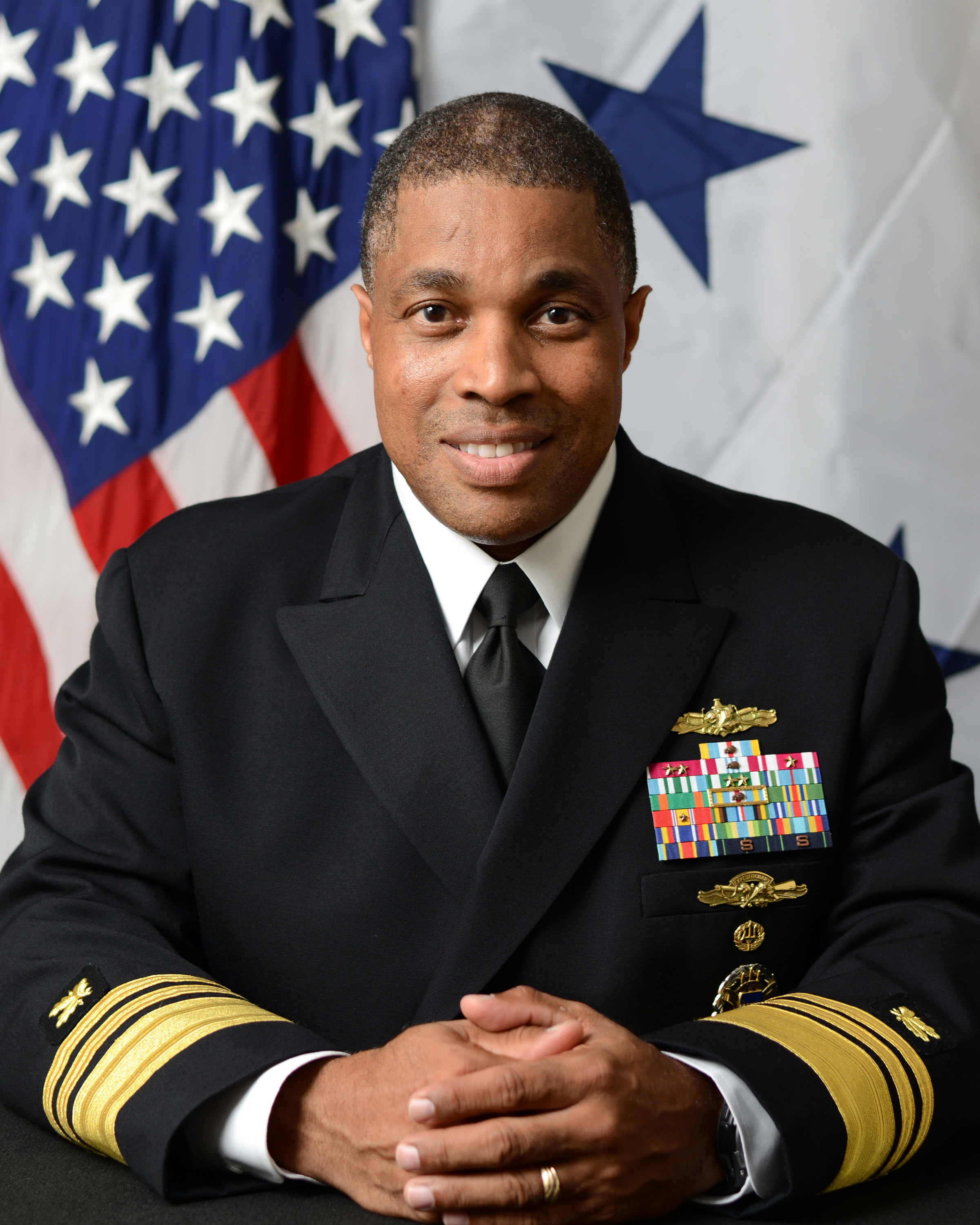
- Official portrait, 2024
- Born: c. 1971 (age 54–55)
- Military career
- Allegiance: United States
- Branch: United States Navy
- Service years: 1993–2026
- Rank: Vice Admiral
- Commands: NAVSUP Fleet Logistics Center Sigonella; Explosive Ordnance Disposal Expeditionary Support Unit One
- Awards: Defense Superior Service Medal (2); Legion of Merit (3)

Dion D. English (born c. 1971) is a retired United States Navy vice admiral who has served as the director for logistics of the Joint Staff from 2024 to 2026. He most recently served as the director of logistics of the U.S. Navy from 2023 to 2024. He previously served as the vice director for logistics of the Joint Staff.

In April 2024, English was nominated for promotion to vice admiral and assignment as director for logistics of the Joint Staff.

Military offices
Preceded by Kristen B. Fabry	Director of Logistics, Fleet Supply, and Ordnance of the United States Pacific Fleet; 2020–2022	Succeeded by Kristin Acquavella
Preceded by David W. Maxwell	Vice Director for Logistics of the Joint Staff; 2022–2023	Succeeded by Thomas J. Moreau
Preceded by Thomas J. Moreau	Director of Logistics of the United States Navy; 2023–2024	Succeeded by Timothy A. Brown
Preceded by Leonard Kosinski	Director for Logistics of the Joint Staff; 2024–2026	Succeeded by Keith D. Reventlow
