= Australian Defence College =

Division within the Australian Department of Defence

Agency overview
- Jurisdiction: Commonwealth of Australia
- Headquarters: Canberra, Australia; 35°19′11″S 149°03′29″E
- Minister responsible: Minister for Defence
- Parent agency: Department of Defence (Australia)
- Website: Australian Defence College

The Australian Defence College (ADC) comprises three joint education and training organisations operated by the Australian Defence Force in Canberra, Australian Capital Territory:

- the War College,
- the Australian Defence Force Training Centre (ADFTC), and
- the Australian Defence Force Academy (ADFA).

The ADC is commanded by a two-star officer. Each of the educational organisations is commanded by a one-star officer or Colonel (equivalent), titled Commandant of their organisation.

The Australian Defence Force Warfare Training Centre and Peace Operations Training Centre are sited at a campus at Weston, ACT.

== History ==
The current Australian Defence College has its origins in the report of the Defence Efficiency Review from May 1997. The report recommended sweeping changes to officer education in the Australian Defence Force.

The Australian Defence College (ADC) was officially opened on 18 January 1999 by the Hon Bruce Scott MP, Minister Assisting the Minister of Defence. The founding Commander of the ADC was Rear Admiral Raydon Gates CSM, RAN.

The first two courses that were run at the new ADC in 1999 were the Defence Staff Course (DSC) and the Defence and Strategic Studies Course (DSSC). In 2000 these two courses were merged to form one course, the Defence and Strategic Studies Course.

On 14 March 2001 the then Governor–General, Sir William Deane, officially opened the Australian Command and Staff College (ACSC). Prior to this date, middle management officer Command and Staff training was conducted at separate single Service staff colleges:

- the RAN Staff Course at HMAS Penguin in Sydney;
- the Army Command and Staff Course was conducted at Fort Queenscliff in Victoria; and
- the RAAF Staff Course at RAAF Fairbairn in the Australian Capital Territory.

On 1 October 2007 the Australian Defence Force Warfare Centre (ADFWC) came under command of the Commander ADC, as part of the Vice Chief of the Defence Force Group.

In July 2017, the Australian Defence College transferred to the new Joint Capabilities Group.

In 2019, under the command of General Ryan, the Australian Defence College implemented a major organisational reform after nearly two decades. The changes included the amalgamation of the Centre for Defence and Strategic Studies and the Australian Command and Staff College to form the Australian War College, to focus on Joint Professional Military Education. Individual training delivered by the Australian Defence Force Warfare Training Centre, Peace Operations Training Centre, Defence Force Chaplains College, Defence International Training Centre, and Defence Force School of Languages was centralised to the Australian Defence Force Training Centre.

=== Commanders ===
Commander, Australian Defence College
Commander	Term began	Term ended
Rear Admiral Raydon Gates CSM, RAN	January 1999	August 2002
Major General Jim Molan AO	August 2002	April 2004
Rear Admiral Mark Bonser AO, CSC, RAN	May 2004	January 2006
Major General David Morrison AM	January 2006	April 2007
Brigadier Brian Dawson AM, CSC (Acting)	April 2007	August 2007
Rear Admiral Davyd Thomas AO, CSC, RAN	August 2007	January 2008
Rear Admiral Davyd Thomas AO, CSC, RAN	January 2008	May 2008
Rear Admiral James Goldrick AO, CSC, RAN	May 2008	August 2011
Major General Craig Orme AM, CSC	August 2011	July 2013
Major General Simone Wilkie AO	July 2013	January 2018
Major General Mick Ryan AM	January 2018	February 2022
Air Vice-Marshal Stephen Edgeley AM	February 2022	July 2023
Rear Admiral James Lybrand CSC	July 2023	December 2025
Major General Martin White CSC	January 2026	

== Australian War College ==
Badge of the Australian War College

On 15 February 2019, the Hon Darren Chester MP, Minister for Defence Personnel, officially opened the new Australian War College.

The War College delivers the Australian Defence Force's core Joint Professional Military Education continuum through the War College's two principal courses: The Australian Command and Staff Course and The Defence Strategic Studies Course.

Both courses use distinguished guest lecturers to give the course a practical context. Visiting Fellows include prominent academics from overseas.

=== Commandants ===
The following is a list of the Commandants, Australian War College.

Commander	Term began	Term ended
Air Commodore Matt Hegarty CSC	January 2019	January 2020
Commodore Richard Boulton AM RAN	January 2020	Present

=== Defence and Strategic Studies Course (DSSC) ===
"Joint Services Staff College" is also the former name of the British Joint Service Defence College

In 2019, the Centre for Defence and Strategic Studies (CDSS) – formerly known as the Australian College of Defence and Strategic Studies, and the Joint Services Staff College - was amalgamated with the Australian Command and Staff College to form the Australian War College, which is now responsible for the delivery of CDSS' main course, the Defence and Strategic Studies Course (DSSC). The DSSC is intended for senior Service and civilian officers of mainly Colonel (equiv) rank.

The intensive Defence and Strategic Studies Course (DSSC) primarily uses study modules from Australian universities. The DSSC is intended to give officers of the Australian Defence Force, the Australian Public Service and overseas participants the knowledge and skills required by senior leaders and managers operating in the national security environment. The interconnected thematic core curriculum blocks that are:

- Development of Strategic Thought;
- Command, Strategic Leadership and Management;
- The Contemporary Strategic Setting;
- Future Strategic Settings;
- Australian Strategic policy – Past, Present and Future; and
- Higher Command and Staff Studies.

Successful completion of the DSSC is considered necessary for promotion to Brigadier (equivalent) rank in the Australian Defence Force.

Past Principals Centre for Defence and Strategic Studies (CDSS)

The following is a list of the Principals, Centre for Defence and Strategic Studies.

Principal	Term began	Term ended
Paul Varsanyi	18 January 2000	5 January 2005
Myra Rowling	6 January 2005	8 December 2005
Maurice Hermann	5 January 2006	3 December 2006
Dr Alan Ryan	4 December 2006	January 2012
Ian Errington	January 2012	February 2018
Colonel Charles Weller	February 2018	December 2018

=== Australian Command and Staff Course (ACSC) ===
The Australian Command and Staff Course intellectually prepares future leaders to fulfil command and staff appointments in single-Service, joint, multi-national and interagency environment.

Other courses conducted are:

- RAN Staff Acquaint Course; and
- Army Reserve Command and Staff Course

Other courses are preparations for these:

- Overseas Course Member Orientation Period (OCMOP)
- ACSC Course Member Orientation Week
- Defence International Training Centre
- Australian Defence Force Peace Operations Training Centre Course
- Directing Staff Development Course (DSDP)

The Australian Command and Staff College (ACSC) conducts courses intended to prepare field ranking officers (Major / Lieutenant Commander / Squadron Leader) and their Defence civilian equivalent for staff duties and subsequent promotion to command positions.

Past Commandants Australian Command and Staff College (ACSC)

The following is a list of the Commanders, Australian Command and Staff College.

Commander	Term began	Term ended
Air Commodore Peter McDermott AM, CSC	March 2001	December 2002
Commodore Campbell "Cam" Darby AM, RAN	December 2002	January 2005
Brigadier Michael Clifford CSC	January 2005	July 2005
Brigadier Wayne Bowen SC, AM	July 2005	September 2006
Brigadier Chris Appleton CSC	February 2007	December 2007
Captain Richard McMillan CSC, RAN (acting)	December 2007	March 2008
Brigadier Barry McManus CSC	March 2008	January 2009
Brigadier Wayne Goodman AM	January 2009	May 2010
Commodore Richard Menhinick AM, CSC, RAN	May 2010	2012
Brigadier Peter Gates AM, CSM	2012	2017
Air Commodore Matt Hegarty CSC	2017	2018

=== Roof collapse ===
At about 4.15pm on 30 January 2006, part of the roof collapsed into the staff offices on the second floor used by the ACSC at the Geddes building. Several staff had minor injuries. Classes were moved to the ADFA campus while restoration work was completed.

== Australian Defence Force Training Centre (ADFTC) ==
Badge of the Australian Defence Force Training Centre

The Australian Defence Force Training Centre was stood up in 2019 following the Australian Defence College organisational changes and centralised joint individual training for Defence, Government Agencies and selected foreign students.

The ADFTC is as follows:

- Australian Defence Force Warfare Training Centre, providing individual joint training for Defence, Government Agencies and selected foreign students, as well as assisting with training of joint headquarters staff for operations and job-specific training in the concepts of joint warfare.
- The Peace Operations Training Centre is a joint, inter-agency and multi-national training establishment and a recognised United Nations (UN) training provider. It prepares Australian military, foreign military and civilians from other government departments to deploy on operations. The Peace Operations Training Centre also delivers the Australian Defence Force Gender Advisor Course, training students to apply a Gender perspective into policy, and planning at all levels.
- Defence Force Chaplains College provides Initial, Intermediate and Senior level instruction to Australian Defence Force Chaplains.
- Defence Force School of Languages, which celebrates its 75th anniversary this year, teaches and assesses Australian Defence Force and civilian members in Languages Other Than English (LOTE). The courses are unique within Australian academic institutions due to the intensity of delivery and the focus on military and strategic contexts.
- Defence International Training Centre is the entry point for international military members on arrival in Australia, providing language training, teacher training and cultural familiarisation courses. Defence International Training Centre is a major contributor to Defence regional engagement especially in the South-East Asian and South Pacific regions.

=== Commandants ===
The following is a list of the Commandants, Australian Defence Force Training Centre.

Commander	Term began	Term ended
Captain Ray Leggatt AM, CSC, RAN	January 2019	November 2019
Captain David Luck RAN	November 2019	Present

== Australian Defence Force Academy (ADFA) ==
The Australian Defence Force Academy (ADFA) is the educational institution for trainee officers of the Australian Defence Force, offering three- and four-year primary degrees, and postgraduate degrees.

ADFA's academic services are provided by the University of New South Wales Canberra and academic and some support staff are employed by the university. Military staff conduct a separate Joint Military Education and Training program to prepare the trainee officers for their military careers.

The campus is in Campbell, ACT, and is located between Russell, Campbell Park and Duntroon.

Current Commandant: Brigadier Troy Francis

Rector: Professor Emma Sparks
