= Marine Corps Installations Pacific =

Marine Corps Installations Pacific (MCIPAC)
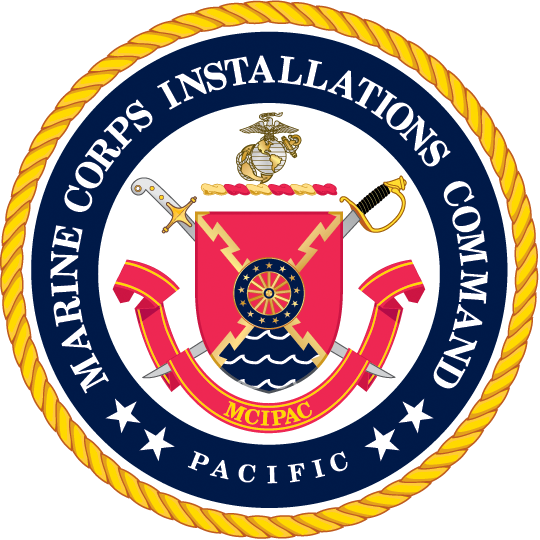
- Active: Sept. 1, 2011 - present
- Allegiance: United States of America
- Branch: United States Marine Corps
- Type: Regional installation management
- Role: Support to operating forces
- Size: ~7,300
- Headquarters: Camp Foster
- Nickname: MCIPAC
- Anniversaries: Sept. 1, 2011.

Commanders
- Current commander: MajGen Brian N. Wolford

Marine Corps Installations Pacific (MCIPAC) is the United States Marine Corps command responsible for managing Marine Corps installations in the Indo-Pacific region. Headquartered at Camp H. M. Smith in Hawaii, MCIPAC oversees installation support, infrastructure, and base services for Marine Corps facilities in Hawaii, Japan, and the Republic of Korea.

Established to provide regional oversight of installation management, MCIPAC coordinates policies, planning, resource allocation, and support services across Marine Corps installations within its area of responsibility.

MCIPAC oversees a workforce consisting of U.S. military personnel, civilian employees, and locally employed personnel in Japan and the Republic of Korea. The command provides installation support for Marine Corps units operating in the Indo-Pacific region and is responsible for managing military infrastructure, training areas, utilities, housing, and other base support services at Marine Corps installations under its jurisdiction.

In addition to its installation management responsibilities, MCIPAC coordinates with host-nation governments, local communities, and military partners throughout the Indo-Pacific region. The command supports bilateral planning and cooperation activities with regional allies, particularly in Japan and the Republic of Korea, on matters related to base operations, military training, infrastructure management, and readiness requirements.

== Mission ==
Marine Corps Installations Pacific is commanded by a major general and is headquartered at Camp Foster in Okinawa, Japan. The command provides installation support and administrative services for Marine Corps operating forces and tenant commands throughout its area of responsibility.

== Subordinate commands ==
- Marine Corps Base Camp Smedley D. Butler
- Marine Corps Base Hawaii
- Marine Corps Air Station Iwakuni
- Marine Corps Air Station Futenma
- Combined Arms Training Center Camp Fuji
- Camp Mujuk, South Korea

== Unit Awards ==
Streamer	Award	Year(s)
	Navy Unit Commendation Streamer with two Bronze Stars	2001-2003
	National Defense Service Streamer with one Bronze Star	
	Global War on Terrorism Service Streamer	2001–present

== See also ==
- Marine Corps Installations West
- Marine Corps Installations East
- Marine Corps Installations Command
