= Campbell Park, Canberra =

Coordinates: 35°16′55″S 149°10′18″E

Campbell Park
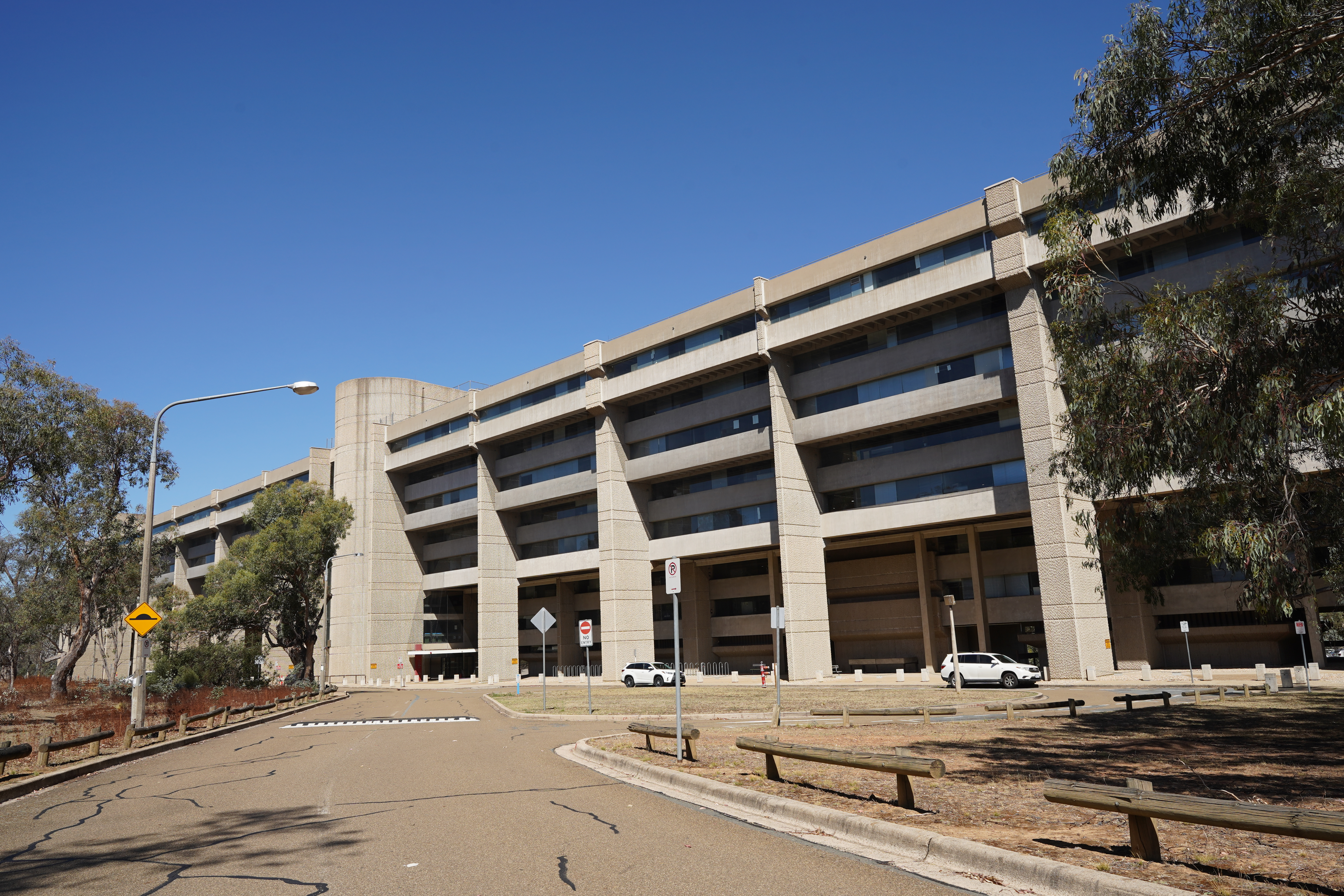
- Campbell Park Offices from Northcott Drive
- Interactive map of the Campbell Park area

General information
- Type: Headquarters (administration)
- Architectural style: Brutalist Structuralism
- Location: Canberra, Australia
- Owner: Australian Dept. of Defence

Technical details
- Material: Reinforced concrete
- Floor count: 7

Design and construction
- Architects: Theo Hirsch and James McCormick

The Campbell Park Offices, also known simply as Campbell Park, is a large 1970s brutalist-style office complex located in the Campbell Park Woodlands at the southeast base of Mount Ainslie, Canberra, the national capital of Australia. Together with the nearby Russell Offices, it forms the headquarters of the Department of Defence and Australian Defence Force (ADF).

== History ==
By the mid 1960s it was clear that the Department of Defence needed more space than was available at the Russell Offices site, and a search for a suitable location that could house thousands of personnel began. In 1968 the site in the wooded area at the south east foot on Mount Ainslie was decided on, which despite its relative isolation was felt to be able to provide good connection to the Russell offices site, along a new road, now known as Northcott Ave. Some Canberrans on the other hand feel that it has been somewhat hidden away on purpose. The site's location adjacent to the airport meant that Defence had to accept a long low building rather than the preferred high-rise option. The job was given to the ACT Branch of the Federal Department of Works (later the Department of Housing and Construction), their first such large scale project in Canberra. The Principal Architect in the Branch was James McCormick, who in turn appointed the young graduate Theo Hirsch as the principal designer of the project, along with Max Barham and Bill Adamson, beginning work in 1969.

After the adoption of the design concept of long wings separated by service towers, with a finish of off-form concrete, considerable effort was put into achieving a warm colour by choosing an aggregate from Cooma rather than the standard black aggregate from Mt Mugga.

The complex was built in three stages, with the first stage comprising the southern two wings completed in 1973, and the last wing completed in 1976.

Two more sections were planned at the northern end, bending back towards the hill, making an S shape. The north end of Node E features protruding reinforcing bars at the floor levels, and the corridor ends can clearly be seen. It is said that the discovery of instabilities in the earth caused the plans to be shelved, but it is likely that funding just ceased.

It was built during the second decade of the expansion of Canberra under the National Capital Development Commission, an authority that oversaw the construction of very large office complexes and other buildings in the 1970s that are amongst the most dramatic examples of the Brutalist style in Australia, buildings that displayed the bold sculptural and structural possibilities of concrete. These include John Andrew's Cameron Offices, 1970-76 (partly demolished), and his Callam Offices in Woden (1977–81), the Canberra School of Music by Daryl Jackson and Evan Walker (1970–76), the Edmund Barton Building by Harry Seidler (1970–74), and the High Court (1975-1980) and the National Gallery of Australia (1973-1982) both by Edwards Madigan Torzillo & Briggs. The Campbell Park Offices is the least known of this group due to its isolated location, and is one which is "more rugged and uncompromising".

In 1975 it won the Concrete Institute of Australia's Principal Award for Excellence in Concrete.

In 2002, along with many Defence properties, the Campbell Park Offices were sold and leased back from the private sector.

== Description ==
The building is accessed from Northcott Drive, which passes the Australian Defence Force Academy and the Royal Military College, Duntroon to the south then on to the Russell Offices. It crosses Fairbairn Avenue that runs between the airport (formerly the Royal Australian Air Force Fairbairn base) and the Australian War Memorial. Northcott Drive runs along part of the uphill side of the building, and there is a drive on the down-hill side which leads to the extensive car parking areas.

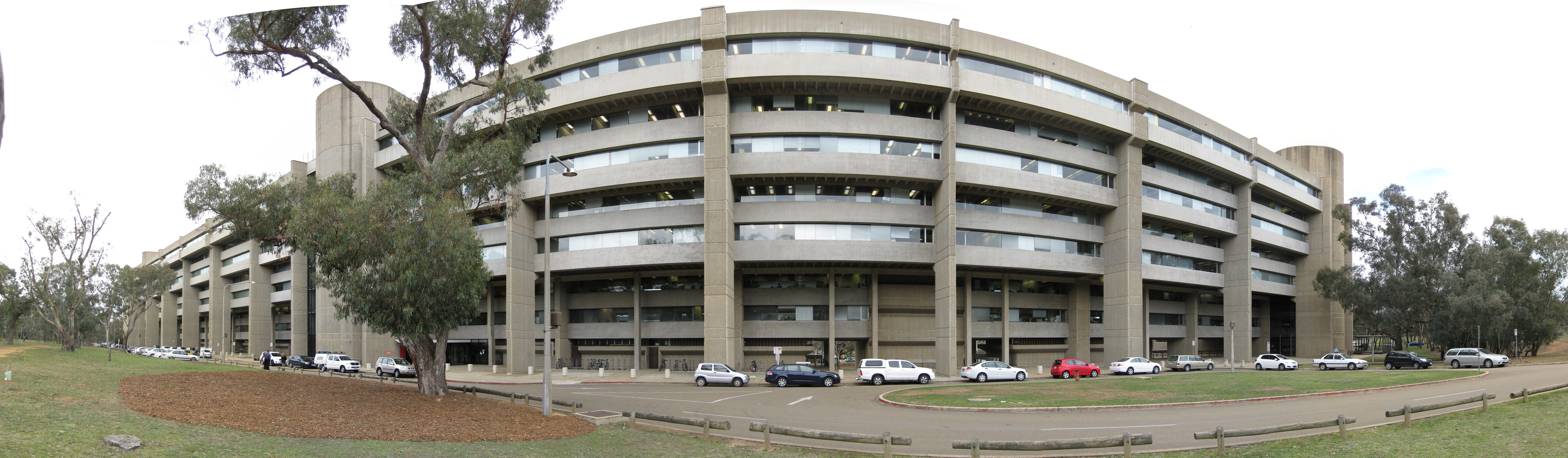
Campbell Park Offices from Northcott Drive

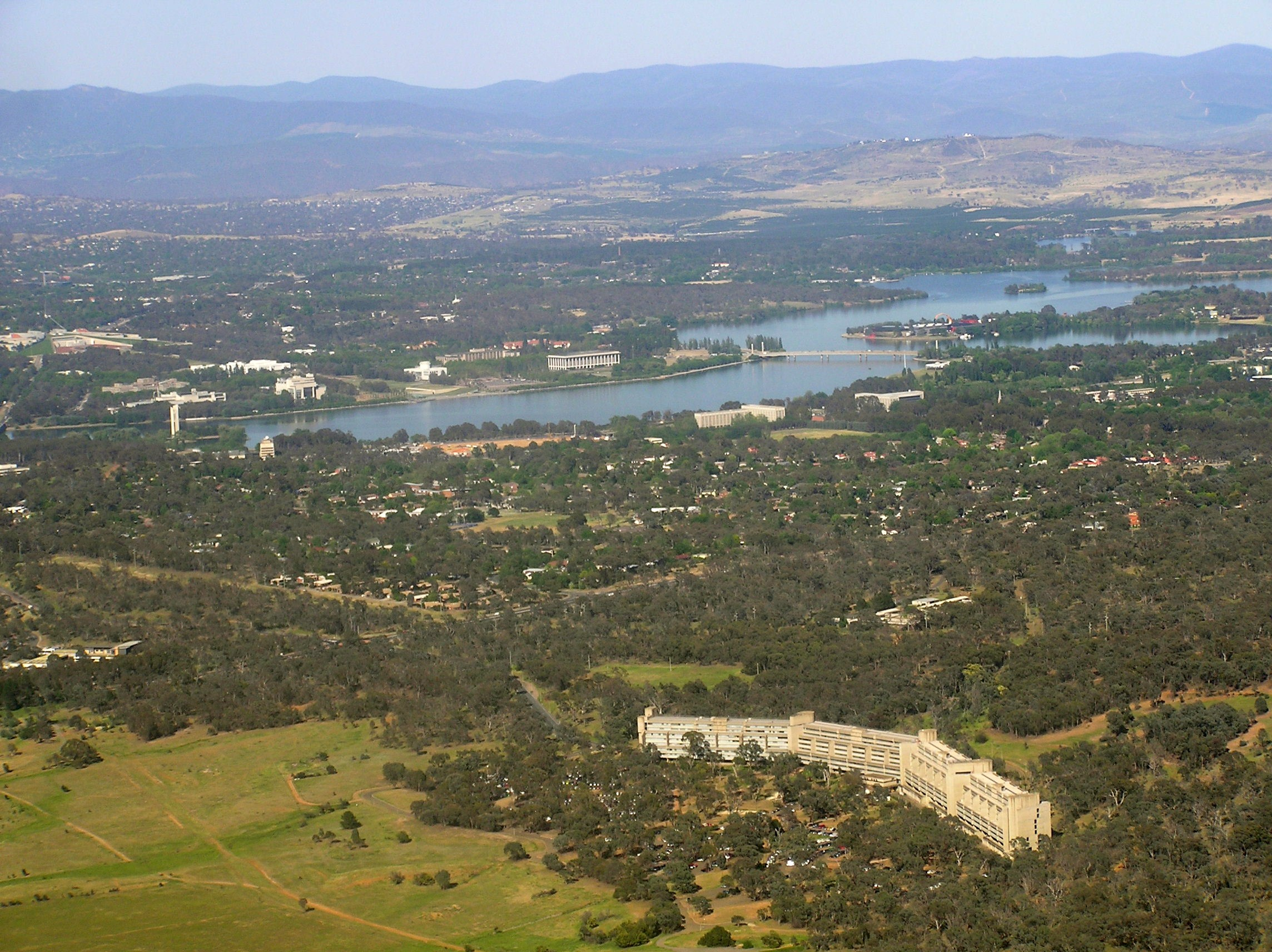
Aerial view from north east

The building houses 2200 personnel in four long sections running generally north–south, numbered CP1-CP4 from the south end, and the vertical nodes where they join are lettered A-E. Access is by main security entrances at B and D Nodes. A commercial cafeteria and banking facilities are at Node C, Ground level. Personnel must exit the building to use these. Underground document storage and a gym is below part of the building.

The building looks eastward across the Majura Valley and Canberra Airport and backs onto Mount Ainslie, with seven floors of varying width, staggered back to the west to blend with the profile of the hill, and shade most floors from the afternoon sun. The cross section is complex, with the office floors elevated above various service rooms, the cafeteria, entries and walkways, most floors being 13.3m wide, except levels 5 and 7 which are wider, creating 3 setbacks on the front, and four on the rear. All floors are accessed by central corridors, which also stagger back in, in a sequence matching the front setbacks.

The first three sections each bend slightly away from each other towards the east, with Nodes B and C being triangular in plan, while D is squarer, and the last, northernmost section runs in a straight line from the third section. The last Node is triangular in the opposite direction to the others, as part of the original concept that further sections would have bent back towards the hill, creating an S shape. The Nodes contain lifts, stairs and toilets, and all Nodes except A have striking open spiral stairs. The vertical structure consists of the Nodes, and evenly spaced supports formed as fin-like walls, which are expressed as tall piers on the rear, breaking up the space under the overhanging floors in a rhythm of thicker and thinner walls, while on the front the floors are partly cantilevered, thrusting forward on the first three floors to support only the spandrel beams, then as vertical walls for the next three floors, then as spandrel supports again for the final two floors.

All concrete surfaces are in off-form concrete, with the spandrels, some columns and the underside of the floors smooth finished, while all other surfaces are vertically ribbed and bush hammered. This finish was achieved by placing vertical timber rods in the formwork, resulting in smooth semi-circular grooves 50mm deep and protruding nibs, which were then hammered every 100mm vertically, resulting in a "random but consistent pattern [that] is a remarkably successful marriage of an ancient building material and patient handiwork". It was the largest example of the technique in Australia at the time.
