= Mick Ryan (general) =

Australian army officer

- Military career
- Allegiance: Australia
- Branch: Australian Army
- Service years: 1987–2022
- Rank: Major General
- Units: 1st Field Squadron, RAE, 1st Combat Engineer Regiment, 1st Brigade, Australian Defence College
- Commands: Australian Defence College (2018–22); 1st Brigade (2014–16); 1st Reconstruction Task Force (2006–07); 1st Combat Engineer Regiment (2006–07)
- Conflicts: United Nations Transitional Administration in East Timor; Iraq War; War in Afghanistan
- Awards: Member of the Order of Australia; Meritorious Service Medal (United States); Joint Service Commendation Medal (United States)
- Other work: Senior Fellow for Military Studies, Lowy Institute

Major General Michael Barry Ryan, AM is a retired senior officer of the Australian Army and a military strategist. Ryan served as Commander of the Australian Defence College 2018 to 2022, became a Senior Fellow for Military Studies at the Lowy Institute in 2024, and is a Adjunct Fellow of the Center for Strategic and International Studies. He is a commentator on contemporary military affairs, including the Russo-Ukrainian War, Asia/Pacific military strategy, and military matters in the Middle East.

== Military career ==
Ryan graduated from the Royal Military College, Duntroon, in 1989 and was commissioned into the Royal Australian Engineers. He spent over 35 years in the Australian Army and had the honour of commanding soldiers at troop, squadron, regiment, task force and brigade levels. Ryan served in East Timor, Iraq and Afghanistan as well as on the U.S. joint staff in Washington DC.

Mick is a distinguished graduate of the U.S. Marine Corps Command and Staff College (2002), the U.S. Marine Corps School of Advanced Warfighting (2003), and a distinguished graduate from the Johns Hopkins School of Advanced International Studies in Washington DC (2012). In May 2026, Mick completed his PhD at the University of Queensland.

He was appointed a Member of the Order of Australia in the 2008 Australia Day Honours. Ryan retired from the Australian Army as a major general in 2022, having served as Commander of the Australian Defence College from 2018.

== Books and publications ==
Ryan is the author of several books, as well as significant reports and reviews during his military career.

=== Nonfiction ===
- The Ryan Review (2016). A strategic review reform document used in Australian Army education and training.
- Thinking About Strategic Thinking (2021). Report on developing strategic thinking in military institutions.
- War Transformed: The Future of Twenty-First-Century Great Power Competition and Conflict. February 2022, Naval Institute Press.
- The War for Ukraine: Strategy and Adaptation Under Fire. August 2024, Naval Institute Press
- The Future of Deception in War: Lessons from Ukraine (with Peter Singer), New America, June 2025.
- Translating Ukraine Lessons for the Pacific Theatre, Australian Army Research Centre, August 2025.
- Modern war and the systemic learning deficit in Western military institutions, Lowy Institute, 2026.

=== Fiction ===
- White Sun War: The Campaign for Taiwan (2023), Casemate.
