= David W. Maxwell =

U.S. Marine Corps general

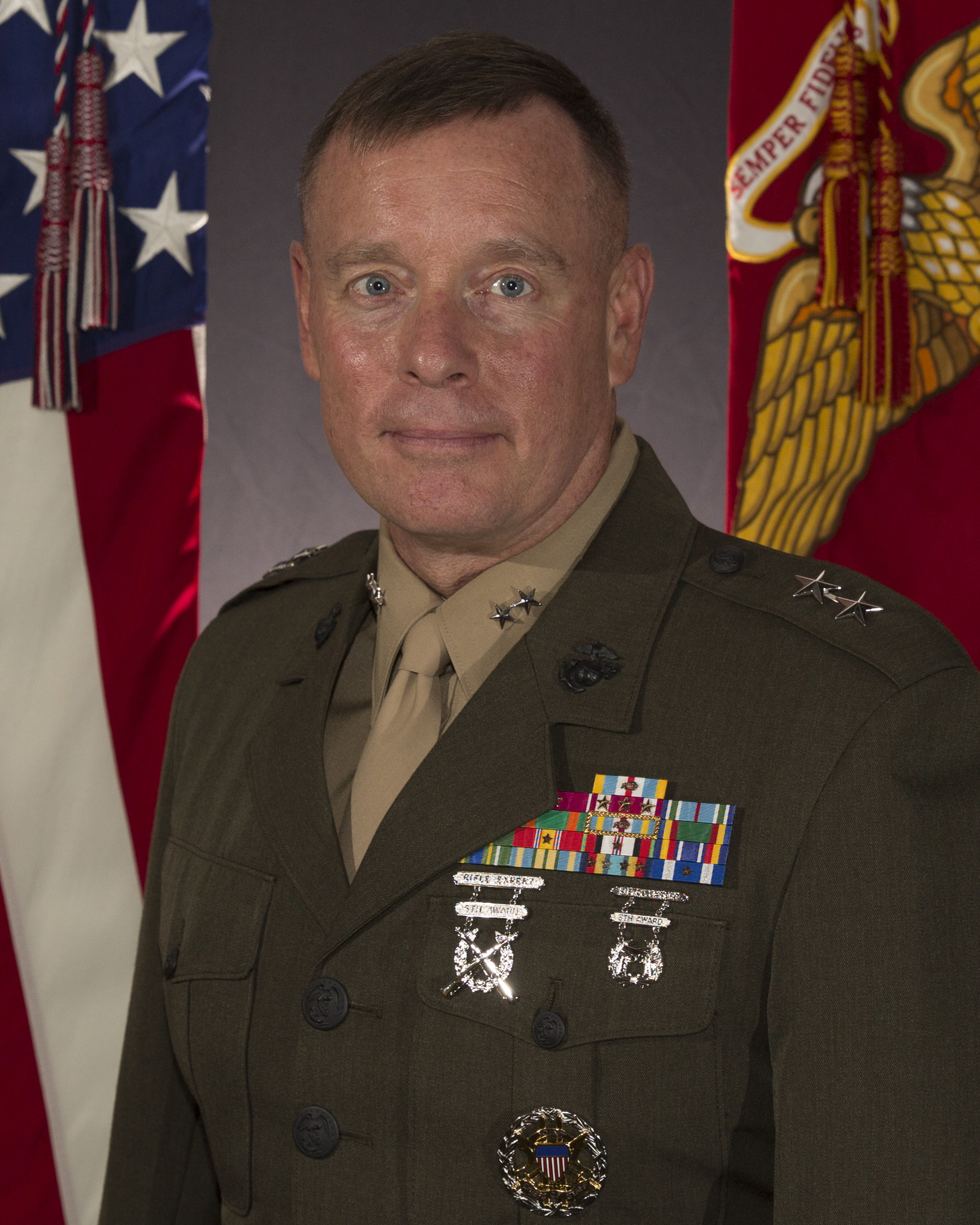
- Military career
- Allegiance: United States
- Branch: United States Marine Corps
- Service years: 1988–2024
- Rank: Major General
- Commands: Marine Corps Installations Command; 2nd Marine Logistics Group; Marine Corps Base Quantico

David Wayne Maxwell is a retired United States Marine Corps major general who served as the commander of Marine Corps Installations Command from 2022 to 2024. He most recently served as the Vice Director for Logistics of the Joint Staff from July 2020 to July 2021. Previously, he was the Assistant Deputy Commandant for Installations and Logistics (Plans, Policies and Strategic Mobility). Maxwell is a 1988 graduate of the United States Naval Academy.

Military offices
Preceded by ???	Director of Logistics of the Resolute Support Mission; 2015–2016	Succeeded by ???
Preceded by Daniel P. O'Hora	Commander of the 2nd Marine Logistics Group; 2016–2018	Succeeded by Kevin J. Stewart
Preceded by ???	Assistant Deputy Commandant for Installations and Logistics (Plans, Policies and Strategic Mobility) of the United States Marine Corps; 2018–2020	Succeeded by ???
Preceded by John Polowczyk	Vice Director for Logistics of the Joint Staff; 2020–2022	Succeeded by Dion D. English
Preceded by Andrew M. Niebel; Acting	Commander of the Marine Corps Installations Command; 2022–2024	Vacant
