= Andrew Wilkie =

Australian politician, soldier, and intelligence officer (born 1961)

Andrew Wilkie MP
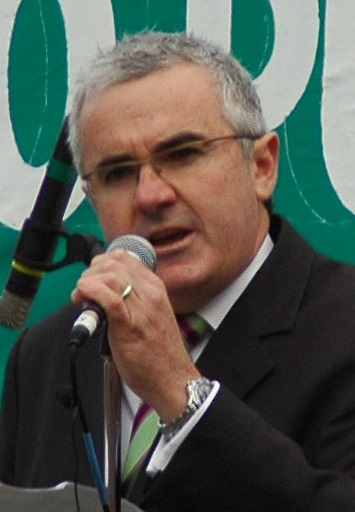
- Wilkie speaking at an anti-pulp mill rally in 2007

Member of the Australian Parliament for Clark
- Incumbent
- Assumed office 18 May 2019
- Preceded by: Electorate established

Member of the Australian Parliament for Denison
- In office 21 August 2010 – 18 May 2019
- Preceded by: Duncan Kerr
- Succeeded by: Electorate abolished

Personal details
- Born: Andrew Damien Wilkie; 8 November 1961 (age 65) Tamworth, New South Wales, Australia
- Party: Independent (since 2008)
- Other political affiliations: Greens (2003–2008); Liberal (1980–1986)
- Spouses: Simone Burt (m. 1991; div. 2003) Charlie Burton (m. 2004; div. 2013) Clare Ballingall (m. 2020)
- Children: 2
- Education: Royal Military College, Duntroon; University of New South Wales
- Occupation: Soldier; politician
- Website: www.andrewwilkie.org

Military service
- Allegiance: Australia
- Branch/service: Australian Army
- Years of service: 1980–2004
- Rank: Lieutenant Colonel
- Unit: Royal Australian Infantry Corps
- Commands: 6th Battalion, Royal Australian Regiment

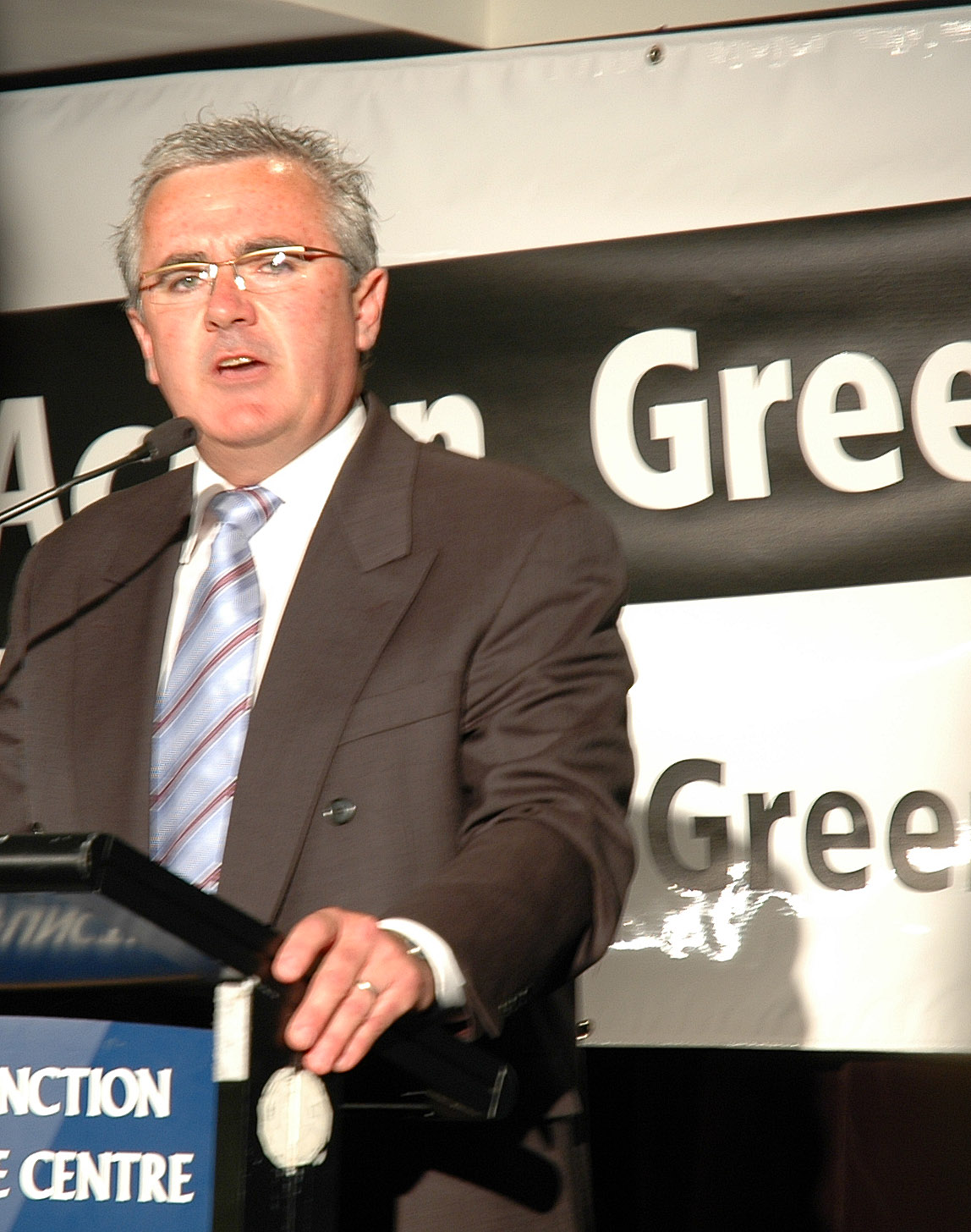
Andrew Wilkie ran for the Australian Greens in 2007

Andrew Damien Wilkie (born 8 November 1961) is an Australian politician and independent federal member for Clark (previously Denison). Before entering politics Wilkie was an infantry officer in the Australian Army.

Wilkie served with the Australian Army from 1980 to 2004. An officer with the Royal Australian Infantry Corps who had earlier commanded a company of the 6th Battalion, Royal Australian Regiment, at the time of his entry to public life Wilkie was posted to Australia's Office of National Assessments as an intelligence analyst. In 2003, in the lead-up to the Iraq War, he resigned from his position at the ONA in protest against the way in which the intelligence that he analysed was being misrepresented.

Following his resignation he said: Iraq's "weapons of mass destruction program is very disjointed and contained by the regime that's been in place since the last Gulf War. And there is no hard intelligence linking the Iraqi regime to al-Qaeda in any substantial or worrisome way." He opposed Australia's contribution to the 2003 invasion of Iraq under the Howard government. Wilkie later argued the Iraq War was based on a "lie".

Wilkie has been active in politics since 2003. He was a Greens candidate for the federal Division of Bennelong in the 2004 federal election against then-Prime Minister John Howard and for the Senate in Tasmania at the 2007 federal election. In 2010 he stood as an independent candidate for the state seat of Denison at the Tasmanian state election, narrowly missing out on the final vacancy. Later in the year, again as an independent candidate, he ran for the federal seat of Denison at the 2010 federal election and won, finishing third on the primary vote but winning the seat after the distribution of preferences. Wilkie finished first on the primary vote at both the 2013 federal election and 2016 federal election, increasing his margin each time.

In 2019, the Division of Denison was replaced by the Division of Clark, to which Wilkie transferred.

He retained the seat at the 2022 Australian federal election by a margin of 20.82%.

In the 2025 Australian federal election, Wilkie maintained his seat winning 70.38% of the two-candidate-preferred result.

== Early life and education ==
Wilkie attended St Gregory's College, Campbelltown and later trained at the Royal Military College, Duntroon and graduated in 1984. He joined the Young Liberals while a cadet. He also studied at the University of New South Wales, and holds a Bachelor of Arts degree, a Graduate Diploma of Management, and a Graduate Diploma of Defence Studies. After graduation and being stationed in Brisbane, he joined the Liberal Party before allowing his membership to lapse. His military career spanned 1980–2001 and he rose to the rank of lieutenant colonel. He was seconded to the ONA, an Australian intelligence agency, from 1999 until late 2000. After a stint with US defence company Raytheon, Wilkie returned to the ONA shortly after the September 11 attacks.

== Military career, 1980–2003 ==
Wilkie joined the Army in 1980, and was first stationed in Brisbane, Queensland. He served in the Royal Australian Infantry Corps and achieved the rank of lieutenant colonel. He was discharged in 2001.

=== Opposition to Iraq War ===
Iraq failed to comply with demands to allow unfettered arms inspections, and the Howard government elected to send forces to support the 2003 invasion of Iraq. While the Government was considering the case for war, Wilkie was asked to report on humanitarian considerations. According to a leaked report published in the Herald Sun, in December 2002 Wilkie submitted to the government an Office of National Assessments report on the humanitarian implications of war in Iraq. In the report he cautioned against unpredictable and potentially serious humanitarian consequences of war with Iraq, such as the use of weapons of mass destruction against civilians.

Wilkie gave evidence to official British and Australian inquiries into the government's case for involvement in the Iraq war. In 2004, Wilkie published Axis of Deceit, an account of the reasons for his decision and its results.

Following Britain's 2016 Chilcot Report which criticised the Blair Government's prosecution of the war, Wilkie said that Howard, Bush and Blair should be brought before an international court, and called for Australia to hold another inquiry into the war. Howard rejected Wilkie's proposition and called him "irrational", telling the media: "Andrew Wilkie said the Iraq invasion was responsible for the Bali attack of 2005. What about the Bali attack of 2002? And he blamed it [the Iraq War] on the Lindt Cafe siege. I mean, this is irrational."

=== Resignation from ONA (2003) ===
On 11 March 2003, Wilkie resigned from the ONA, stating that Iraq was not a security threat to the US, the UK, Australia or to any other country and that a war may provoke Saddam Hussein to use weapons of mass destruction or support terrorism. Wilkie told the ABC: "I think that invading Iraq at this time would be wrong. For a start, Iraq does not pose a security threat to any other country at this point in time. Its military is very weak, it's a fraction of the size of the military at the time of the invasion of Kuwait. Its weapons of mass destruction program is very disjointed and contained by the regime that's been in place since the last Gulf War. And there is no hard intelligence linking the Iraqi regime to al-Qaeda in any substantial or worrisome way." Wilkie later told the press that in the lead up to his resignation he had increasingly encountered ethical conflict between his duty as an intelligence officer and his "respect for the truth". In 2016, after appearing at the Chilcot enquiry, Wilkie said the notion that Iraq had weapons of mass destruction and co-operated with terrorists had been "a lie ... No wonder John Howard and Tony Blair and George W Bush do stand accused of war crimes". He linked the 2005 Bali bombings and the 2014 Lindt Cafe siege to Australia's participation in the invasion of Iraq.

== Political career, 2004–present ==
=== Candidacy for Australian Greens (2004–2008) ===
Wilkie became a member of the Australian Greens by 2004, and stood as their candidate for the seat of Bennelong in that year's federal election, running against sitting prime minister John Howard. He was a supporter of the 'Not happy, John!' campaign which ran during the election campaign. Polling 16.37% of the primary vote, Wilkie achieved the fifth-highest vote percentage for a Greens candidate across the nation at the time. This result was a considerable increase from the Greens' previous election result in Bennelong of 4.03%. Although Wilkie's vote was nowhere near enough to win the seat, there was an overall swing of 3.18% against Howard, who achieved a primary vote of only 49.89%, which resulted in the seat being decided on preferences.

Wilkie did not run again for Bennelong in the 2007 federal election, instead running as the Greens' second Tasmanian candidate for the Australian Senate, behind the party's federal leader, Bob Brown. He was not elected.

He resigned from the party in 2008, criticising it for a lack of professionalism.

=== Member of Parliament (2010–present) ===
Gillard–Rudd government

Wilkie stood as an independent candidate in the state Division of Denison, based around central Hobart, in the 2010 Tasmanian state election. He won 8.44 per cent of first preference votes, and was beaten by 315 votes by Liberal candidate Elise Archer after distribution of preferences.

Wilkie stood as an independent for the federal Division of Denison, which has the same boundaries as the state division, in the 2010 federal election and won more than 20 per cent of the primary vote. The Australian Broadcasting Corporation declared Wilkie the winner on election night, predicting that Wilkie would be vaulted into second place on Green preferences and ultimately take the seat on Liberal preferences. On the third count, he picked up enough Green preferences to put him in second place, ahead of the Liberal candidate. On the fourth count, more than 79 percent of the Liberal candidate's preferences flowed to Wilkie, allowing him to win the seat with just over 51 per cent of the two-candidate-preferred vote. Reportedly, Wilkie benefited from what was perceived to have been a lacklustre campaign by Labor's candidate, Jonathan Jackson, the son of former longtime state Labor minister Judy Jackson; Labor lost almost a quarter of its primary vote from 2007, and Labor theoretically tallied a two-party vote of more than 65 percent.

Following the election, he declared that he would back the Labor minority government, in return for Julia Gillard's administration committing $340 million to the Royal Hobart Hospital and a commitment to reduce problem gambling. In contrast the Coalition offered A$1 billion in funding for the same hospital in their offer to Wilkie, which was perceived by Wilkie as "almost reckless". Wilkie described this as being part of the evidence that Labor would better be able to offer a more stable, competent and ethical government than the Coalition. The agreement to support the government only extended to issues of supply and no confidence motions.

Wilkie was unexpectedly admitted to hospital on 12 November 2010 to have his gall bladder removed. This did not interfere with his ability to attend Parliamentary sittings and he was present at the debate on same-sex marriage on 15 November, where he seconded the motion raised by Greens member Adam Bandt.

In April 2011, during push for gambling reform initiated by Wilkie, News Limited media reported allegations by a former Duntroon army cadet that in 1983 Wilkie had forced junior cadets to salute to Adolf Hitler on the 50th anniversary of the latter's rise to power. In response, Wilkie said he had been "involved in bastardisation of teenage army cadets" at Duntroon during the 1980s, and apologised for this "inappropriate behaviour", but could not recall the specific incident alleged. With regard to the allegation and its publication, he accused pro-Pokies advocates of running a smear campaign against him.

On 21 January 2012, Wilkie announced that he was withdrawing his support for the Labor government after it broke the agreement he had signed with Julia Gillard to implement mandatory pre-commitment for all poker machines by 2014. He stated that he would support the government's alternative plan to trial pre-commitment in the ACT and require that pre-commitment technology be installed in all poker machines built from 2013, but that this fell short of what he had been promised in return for supporting the government. Gillard and Minister for Families, Housing, Community Services and Indigenous Affairs Jenny Macklin argued that there was not enough support in the House of Representatives for Wilkie's preferred option for it to be passed, and that they had been advised it was technically infeasible to implement mandatory commitment within the time frame he had specified. In making his announcement, Wilkie stated that he would only support motions of no confidence against the government "in the event of serious misconduct" and would "consider budget measures on their merits".

Abbott-Turnbull government

Wilkie was re-elected in the 2013 federal election, gaining a swing of 15 points to increase his majority to 65 percent.

In October 2014, Wilkie wrote to the International Criminal Court, seeking to prosecute Prime Minister Tony Abbott and the 19 members of his cabinet for crimes against humanity, with particular concerns relating to the treatment of asylum seekers.

Morrison government

In February 2020, Wilkie and fellow MP George Christensen travelled to the UK to meet Australian Wikileaks founder Julian Assange. Both MPs called for Assange to be released.

== Political views ==
In the 2010 Tasmanian state election, Wilkie made the removal of poker machines his primary campaign issue. He strongly opposed the Gunns pulp mill in the Tamar Valley. Wilkie is a supporter of voluntary euthanasia, provided that there are safeguards in place. He is also in favour of same-sex marriage and access to abortion. He supported a National Broadband Network, and also opposed the Howard government's WorkChoices industrial relations reforms.

During Wilkie's maiden speech to federal parliament on 30 September 2010, he called for withdrawal of Australian troops from Afghanistan. He said Australia should be more willing to say "no" more often to the United States, and that there could be no hope for peace in Afghanistan until foreign troops are withdrawn: "No-one should be fooled by the Australian Government's periodic efforts to tinker around the edges with Australia's commitment to Afghanistan" and that "The reality is that the best plan the Australian Government can come up with so far is simply to continue to support whatever the US Government comes up with and that alone is no plan—it's just reinforcing failure."

Wilkie's comments came amid opposition calls for more support for Australia's troops in Afghanistan. During his speech Wilkie also canvassed his push for legislation to protect whistleblowers, measures to tackle problem gambling and a more humane approach to asylum seekers.

In March 2011, he called Liberal MPs Cory Bernardi and Scott Morrison "a disgrace to high office", calling on party leader Tony Abbott to sack them both. In a speech to the House of Representatives, he spoke of the "racism that eats at the Liberal Party".

=== Pokies and pre-commitment ===
Wilkie campaigned heavily against poker machines (colloquially "pokies") at the 2010 federal election, and immediately began forging ties with independent anti-pokies Senator Nick Xenophon. Wilkie claimed that problem gamblers in Australia lose $5 billion each year on pokies. The Labor government gave two commitments regarding pokies in exchange for Wilkie's support. The first was mandatory "pre-commitment" technology, which required a better to commit how much they were willing to bet before starting. The second commitment was to introduce $1 maximum bet per spin machines that would not require pre-commitment. Wilkie argued these $1 maximum machines would be safer. The Abbott Coalition opposed the plans, with Abbott saying "it is not Liberal Party policy" and it will be "expensive and ineffective". According to polling, Wilkie's proposals were supported by a clear majority of voters across the spectrum. Wilkie and Xenophon argued that "$12 billion a year is lost on the pokies. 100,000 Australians are problem gamblers and an additional 200,000 are significantly at risk of developing a full-blown addiction", and that the legislation is necessary to "[help] those who sometimes lose up to $1200 an hour on the pokies." The Labor government withdrew their promised support for Wilkies's plan when their strength in parliament improved through a change of Speaker.

The plan came under sustained attack from clubs, hotels and other businesses which financially benefit from pokies. Xenophon responded by accusing them of misrepresenting plans and creating hype around the issue. Strategy papers erroneously placed on the Clubs Queensland public website seemed to indicate that clubs were deliberately and purposefully exaggerating the impact that the pre-commitment reforms will have on their services. The same papers outlined some strategies that the clubs could use to exploit loopholes in the proposed reform.

The National Rugby League (NRL) aligned themselves with the campaign in opposing the pre-commitment plans, as did some prominent Australian Football League (AFL) people. Commentators from the Nine Network gave planned political arguments without disclosure during commentary of a Semi-final NRL game, prompting the Australian Communications and Media Authority (ACMA) to investigate, stating "Channel Nine broadcast political material without adequately identifying it as such during the NRL first preliminary final". One of the accused commentators stated that the remarks were a "directive from up top that it be read by at least somebody". Investigations were predicted to take months. Andrew Demetriou, chief executive officer of the AFL, rejected suggestions that the AFL was joining Clubs Australia in their media campaign despite opposition to the plan by Collingwood president Eddie McGuire. Other high-profile club bosses including Jeff Kennett (Hawthorn) and David Smorgon (Bulldogs), and also stated "The fellow from Clubs Australia, I don't even know his name, but please, stop talking on our behalf, just shut up, that'd be a good help". Activist group GetUp! attempted to counter the anti-pre-commitment campaign by running political commercials during the NRL grand final but all three major commercial television stations refused to air more of them.

In November 2023, Wilkie introduced a bill targeting loot boxes in video games, stating they "[groom children] for future gambling". The bill would make all games targeting at children that include any form of in-game gambling be mandatorally rated R18+, restricting their purchase to exclusively adults.

== Personal life ==
Wilkie was married to a fellow army officer Simone Wilkie (née Burt) from 1991 to 2003.

He married Kate (now Charlie) Burton in 2004, with whom he has two daughters. However, they separated in 2012 and divorced the following year, with Wilkie citing stress from the 2010–2013 hung parliament as the main cause of the breakdown.

Wilkie became engaged to Clare Ballingall in late 2018, and the pair married in June 2020.

Parliament of Australia
Preceded by Duncan Kerr	Member for Denison; 2010–2019	Division abolished
Division created	Member for Clark; 2019–present	Incumbent
