= Marine Corps Installations West =

Support and oversight of seven United States Marine Corps installations on the West Coast

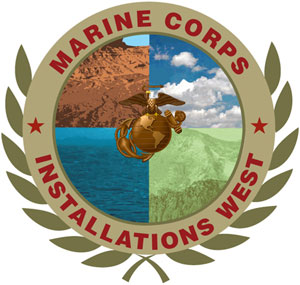
- MCI West Insignia
- Country: United States
- Allegiance: United States of America
- Branch: United States Marine Corps
- Type: Regional installation management
- Role: Installation Support
- Garrison/HQ: Marine Corps Base Camp Pendleton

Commanders
- Current commander: BGen Jason Woodworth

The Marine Corps Installations West (MCI WEST) is the regional authority tasked with providing support and oversight of seven United States Marine Corps installations on the West Coast.

== Function ==
Its functions are implementing policies, developing regional strategies and plans, and prioritizing resources. It also provides services, direction, and oversight through assigned U.S. Marine Corps Installations to support the Operating Forces, tenant commands, and activities—all to keep the Marine Corps ready to be deployed.

== Subordinate commands ==
Marine Corps Recruit Depot San Diego is also a member of the MCICOM West Command. It is also a TECOM base, similar to 29 Palms and Marine Corps Mountain Warfare Training Center Bridgeport also including:

- Marine Corps Base Camp Pendleton
- Marine Corps Air Station Miramar
- Marine Corps Air Station Yuma
- Marine Corps Air Station Camp Pendleton
- Marine Corps Air Ground Combat Center Twentynine Palms
- Marine Corps Logistics Base Barstow
- Mountain Warfare Training Center

== See also ==
- Marine Corps Installations East
- Marine Corps Installations Pacific
- Marine Corps Installations Command
