= Marine Corps Installations East =

Major subordinate command of the U.S. Marine Corps Installations Command

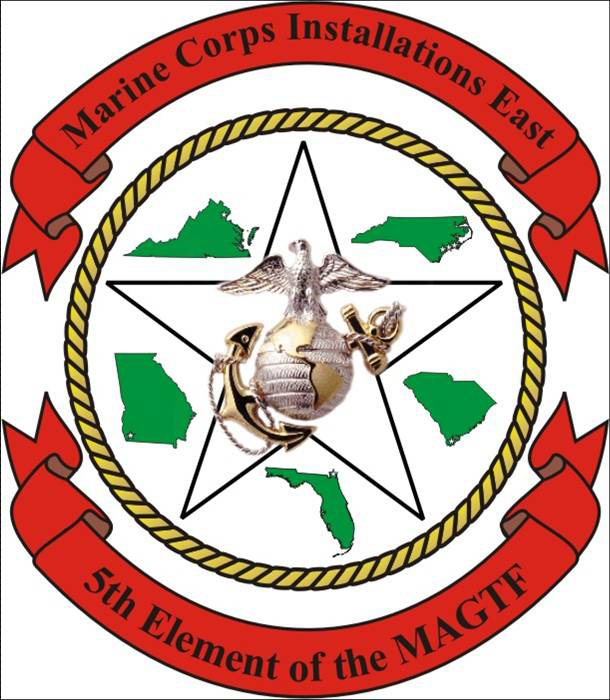
- MCI East Insignia
- Country: United States
- Allegiance: United States of America
- Branch: United States Marine Corps
- Type: Regional installation management
- Role: Installation Support
- Garrison/HQ: Marine Corps Base Camp Lejeune
- Nickname: 5th Element of the MAGTF

Commanders
- Current commander: Brigadier General Andrew M. Niebel

The Marine Corps Installations East (MCIEAST) is the regional authority tasked with providing support and oversight of seven United States Marine Corps installations on the East Coast.

== Mission ==
Implement policies, develop regional strategies and plans, prioritizes resources and provides services, direction, and oversight through assigned U.S. Marine Corps Installations in order to support the Operating Forces, tenant commands and activities.

== Subordinate commands ==
- Marine Corps Logistics Base Albany
- Marine Corps Air Station Beaufort
- Marine Corps Support Facility Blount Island Command
- Marine Corps Air Station Cherry Point
- Marine Corps Base Camp Lejeune
- Marine Corps Air Station New River

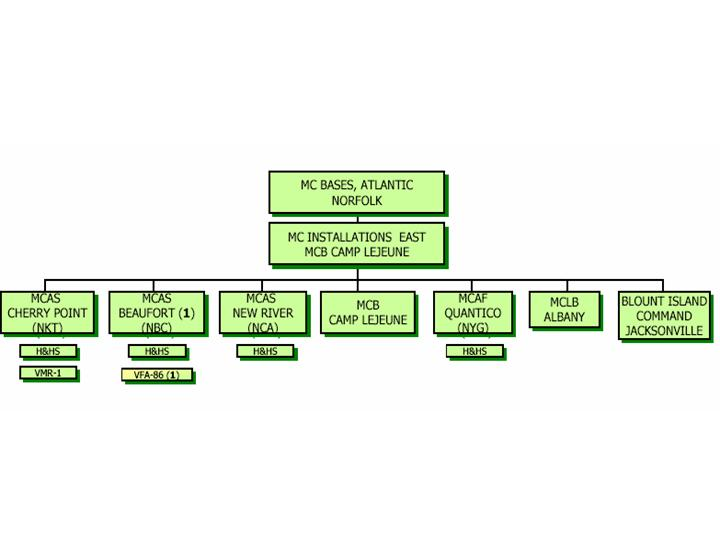
Chart showing the command structure of MCI East

== See also ==
- Marine Corps Installations West
- Marine Corps Installations Pacific
- Marine Corps Installations Command
