= Aviation Combat Element =

Aviation component of the U.S. Marine Corps' Marine Air-Ground Task Forces

In the United States Marine Corps, the Aviation Combat Element or Air Combat Element (ACE) is the aviation component of the Marine Air-Ground Task Force (MAGTF). The ACE is task organized to perform the six functions of Marine Corps aviation in support of MAGTF operations. The ACE is led by an aviation headquarters which employs rotary-wing, tiltrotor, and fixed-wing aircraft in conjunction with command and control, maintenance and engineering units.

== Role within the MAGTF ==
The majority of aircraft usage within the MAGTF is for close air support or transport for the Ground Combat Element (GCE) or Logistics Combat Element (LCE), however, other specialized missions are available. The six main functions include: assault support, anti-air warfare, offensive air support, electronic warfare, control of aircraft and missiles, and aerial reconnaissance.

The Aviation Combat Element (ACE), which contributes the air power to the MAGTF, includes all aircraft (fixed wing, helicopters, tiltrotor, and UAV) and aviation support units. The units are organized into detachments, squadrons, groups, and wings, except for low-altitude air defense units, which are organized into platoons, detachments, batteries, and battalions. These units include pilots, flight officers, enlisted aircrewmen, aviation logistics (aircraft maintenance, aviation electronics, aviation ordnance, and aviation supply) and Navy aviation medical and chaplain's corps personnel, as well as ground-based air defense units, and those units necessary for command and control (management and planning for manpower, intelligence, operations and training, and logistics functions), aviation command and control (tactical air command, air defense control, air support control, and air traffic control), communications, and aviation ground support (e.g., airfield services, bulk fuels/aircraft refueling, crash rescue, engineer construction and utilities support, EOD, motor transport, ground equipment supply and maintenance, local security/law enforcement, and the wing band).

== ACE Organization and size ==
The size of the ACE varies in proportion to the size of the MAGTF. A Marine Expeditionary Force has a Marine Aircraft Wing or MAW. A Marine Expeditionary Brigade holds a Marine Aircraft Group or MAG, reinforced with a variety of aircraft squadrons and support personnel. The various Marine Expeditionary Units command a reinforced squadron, with various types of aircraft mixed into a single unit (known as a composite squadron). Generally, MEF postings are permanent, while MEBs and MEUs rotate their ACE, GCE, and LCE twice annually. 1st and 3rd Marine Aircraft Wings are unique in that they are subordinate to III MEF and I MEF, respectively, while all other equivalent units numerical designators match the MEF to which attached.

== Hierarchy of Marine Aviation units ==
=== 1st Marine Aircraft Wing ===
ACE of III Marine Expeditionary Force

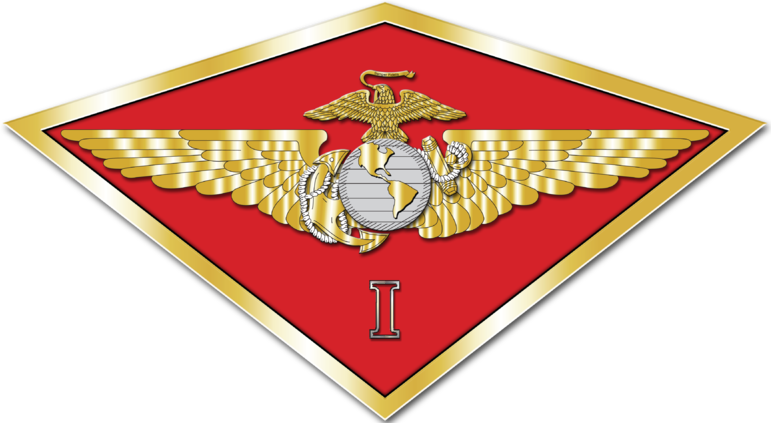

Squadron Name	Insignia	Nickname	Notes
Marine Wing Headquarters Squadron 1		America's Finest	

==== Marine Aircraft Group 12 ====
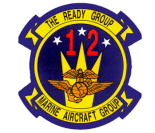

Squadron Name	Insignia	Nickname	Notes
Marine Aviation Logistics Squadron 12		Marauders	
Marine Fighter Attack Squadron 121		Green Knights	
Marine Fighter Attack Squadron 242		Bats	
Marine Aerial Refueler Transport Squadron 152		Sumos	
Marine Wing Support Squadron 171		The Sentinels	

==== Marine Aircraft Group 24 ====
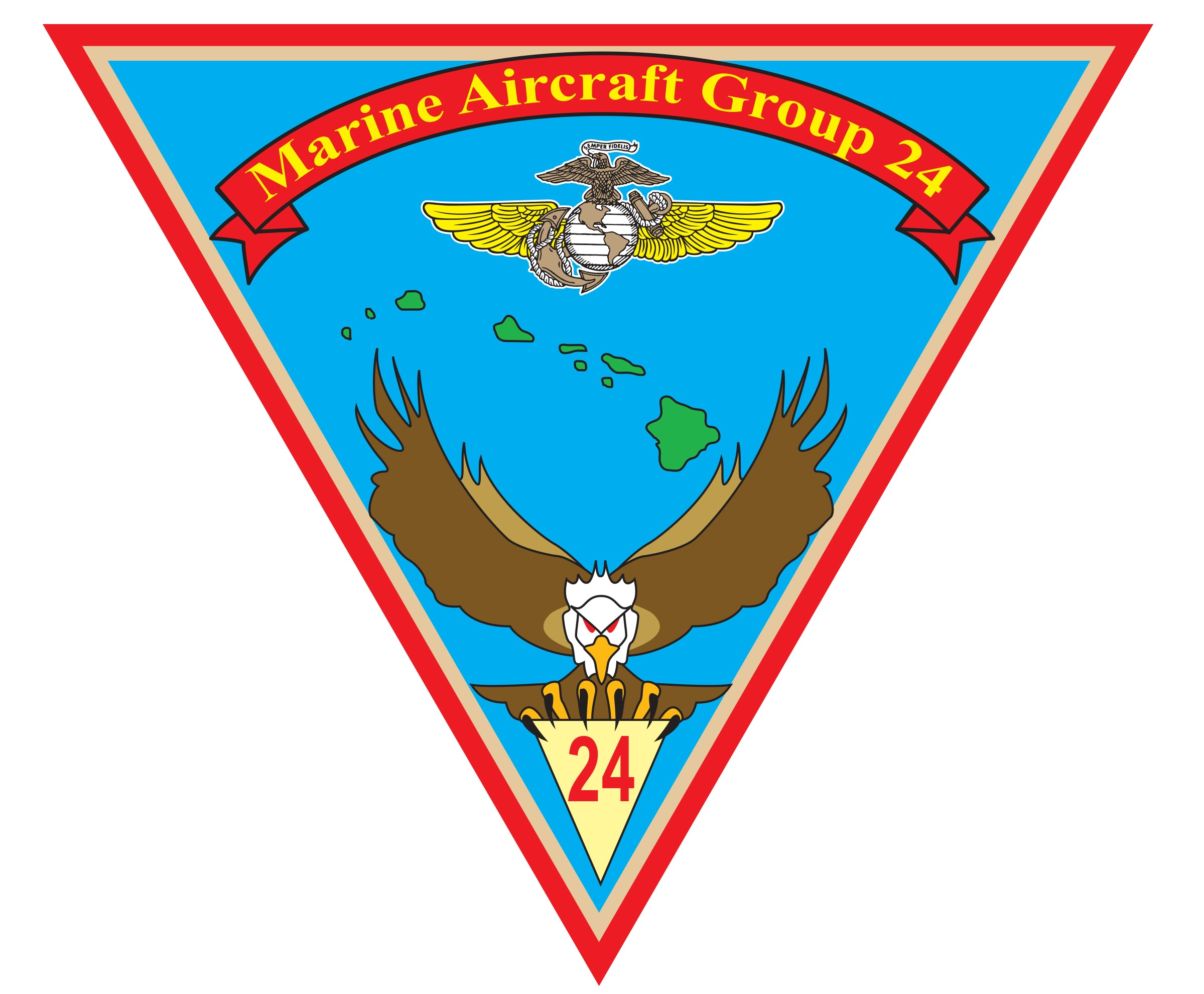

Squadron Name	Insignia	Nickname	Notes
Marine Aviation Logistics Squadron 24		Warriors	
Marine Medium Tiltrotor Squadron 268		Red Dragons	
Marine Medium Tiltrotor Squadron 363		Lucky Red Lions	
Marine Aerial Refueler Transport Squadron 153		Hercules	
Marine Unmanned Aerial Vehicle Squadron 3		Phantoms	
Marine Wing Support Squadron 174		Gryphons	

==== Marine Aircraft Group 36 ====
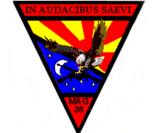

Squadron Name	Insignia	Nickname	Notes
Marine Aviation Logistics Squadron 36		Bladerunner	
Marine Medium Tiltrotor Squadron 262		Flying Tigers	
Marine Medium Tiltrotor Squadron 265		Dragons	
UDP squadrons from II and III MEFs
Marine Wing Support Squadron 172		Firebirds	

==== Marine Air Control Group 18 ====
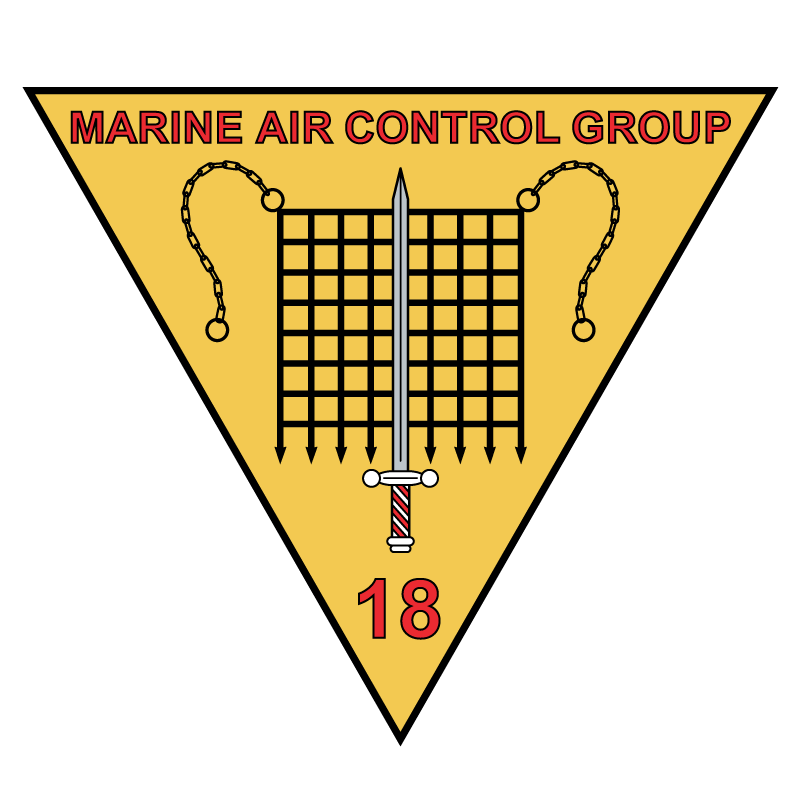

Squadron Name	Insignia	Nickname	Notes
1st LAAD Battalion		Death from Below	
Marine Air Control Squadron 4		Vice Squad	
Marine Air Support Squadron 2		Pacific Vagabonds	
Marine Wing Communications Squadron 18		Warriors	

=== 2nd Marine Aircraft Wing ===
ACE of II Marine Expeditionary Force

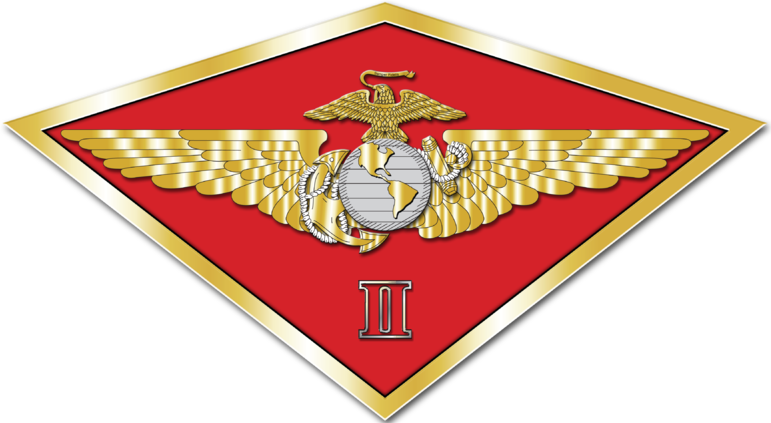

Squadron Name	Insignia	Nickname	Notes
Marine Wing Headquarters Squadron 2		Snake Eyes; The Deuce	

==== Marine Aircraft Group 14 ====
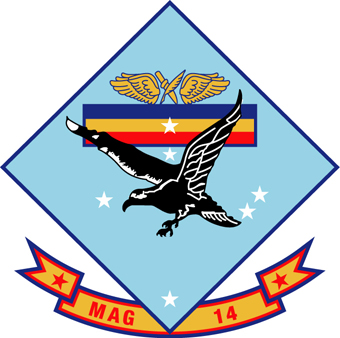

Squadron Name	Insignia	Nickname	Notes
Marine Aviation Logistics Squadron 14		Dragons	
Marine Attack Squadron 223		Bulldogs	
Marine Attack Squadron 231		Ace of Spades	
Marine Aerial Refueler Transport Squadron 252		Otis	
Marine Fighter Attack Squadron 542		Tigers	
Marine Unmanned Aerial Vehicle Training Squadron 2		Night Owls	

==== Marine Aircraft Group 26 ====
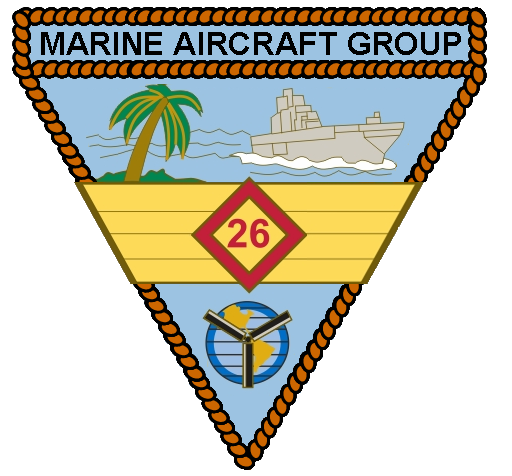

Squadron Name	Insignia	Nickname	Notes
Marine Aviation Logistics Squadron 26		Patriots	
Marine Medium Tiltrotor Squadron 162		Golden Eagles	
Marine Medium Tiltrotor Training Squadron 204		Raptors	
Marine Medium Tiltrotor Squadron 261		Raging Bulls	
Marine Medium Tiltrotor Squadron 263		Thunder Chickens	
Marine Medium Tiltrotor Squadron 266		Fighting Griffins	
Marine Medium Tiltrotor Squadron 365		Blue Knights	

==== Marine Aircraft Group 29 ====
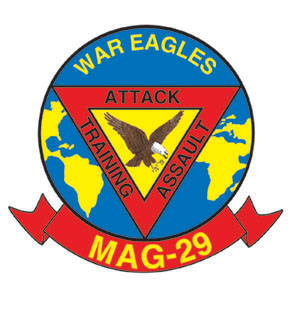

Squadron Name	Insignia	Nickname	Notes
Marine Aviation Logistics Squadron 29		Wolverines	
Marine Light Attack Helicopter Squadron 167		Warriors	
Marine Light Attack Helicopter Squadron 269		Gunrunners	
Marine Helicopter Training Squadron 302		Phoenix	
Marine Heavy Helicopter Squadron 461		Ironhorse	
Marine Heavy Helicopter Squadron 464		Condors	

==== Marine Aircraft Group 31 ====
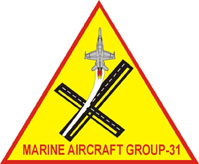

Squadron Name	Insignia	Nickname	Notes
Marine Aviation Logistics Squadron 31		Stingers	
Marine All Weather Fighter Attack Squadron 224		Bengals	
Marine Fighter Attack Squadron 312		Checkerboards	
Marine Fighter Attack Training Squadron 501		Warlords	
Marine Fighter Attack Squadron 533		Hawks	

==== Marine Air Control Group 28 ====
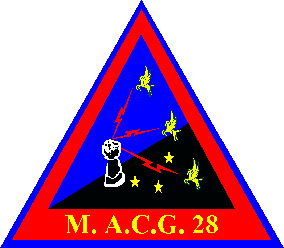

Squadron Name	Insignia	Nickname	Notes
Marine Air Control Squadron 2		Eyes of the MAGTF	
Marine Air Support Squadron 1		Atlantic Nomads	
Marine Wing Communications Squadron 28		Spartans	
2nd Low Altitude Air Defense Battalion		Death from Below	
Marine Wing Support Squadron 271		Workhorse of the Wing	
Marine Wing Support Squadron 272		Untouchables	
Marine Wing Support Squadron 273		Sweathogs	

=== 3rd Marine Aircraft Wing ===
ACE of I Marine Expeditionary Force

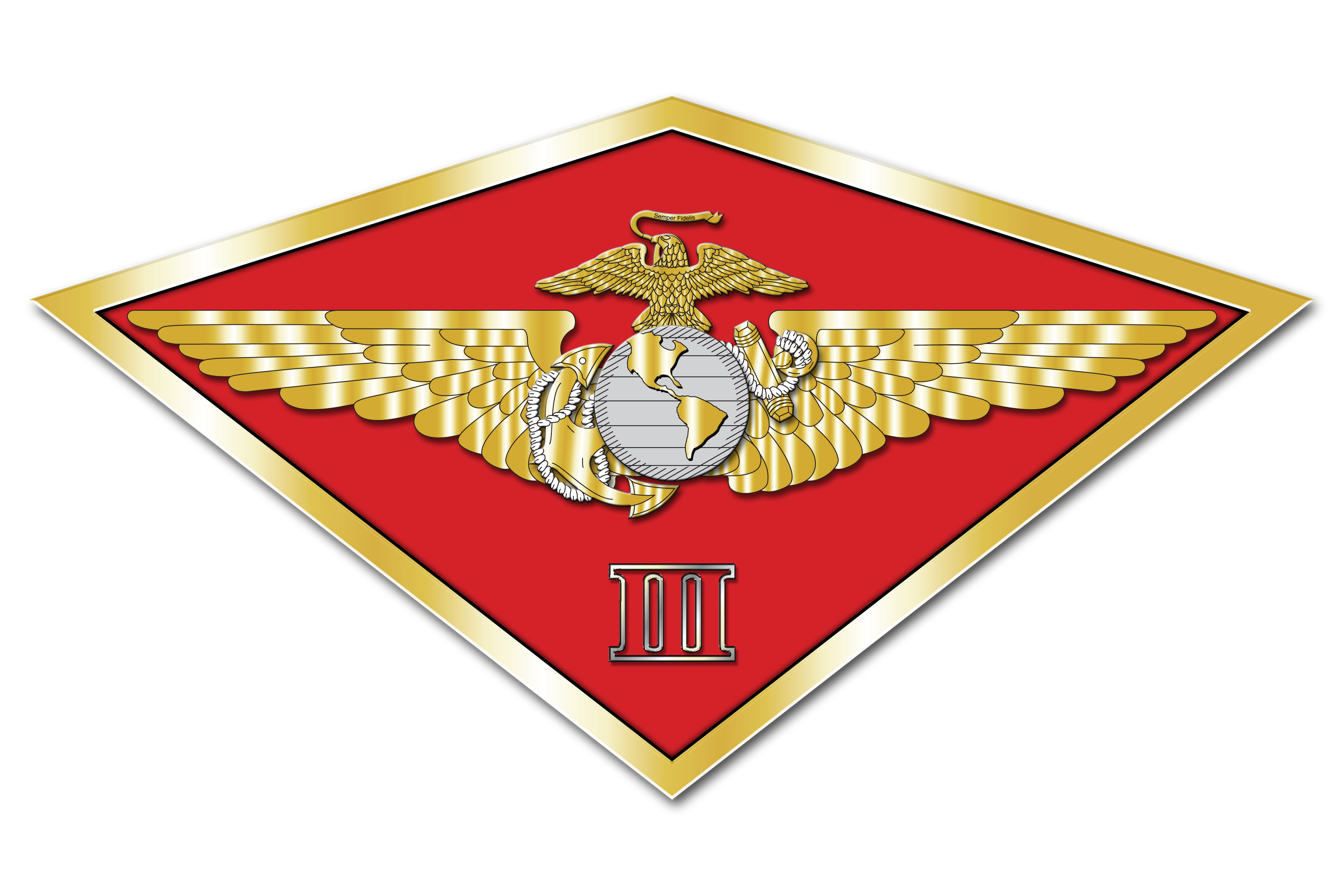

Squadron Name	Insignia	Nickname
Marine Wing Headquarters Squadron 3		

==== Marine Aircraft Group 11 ====
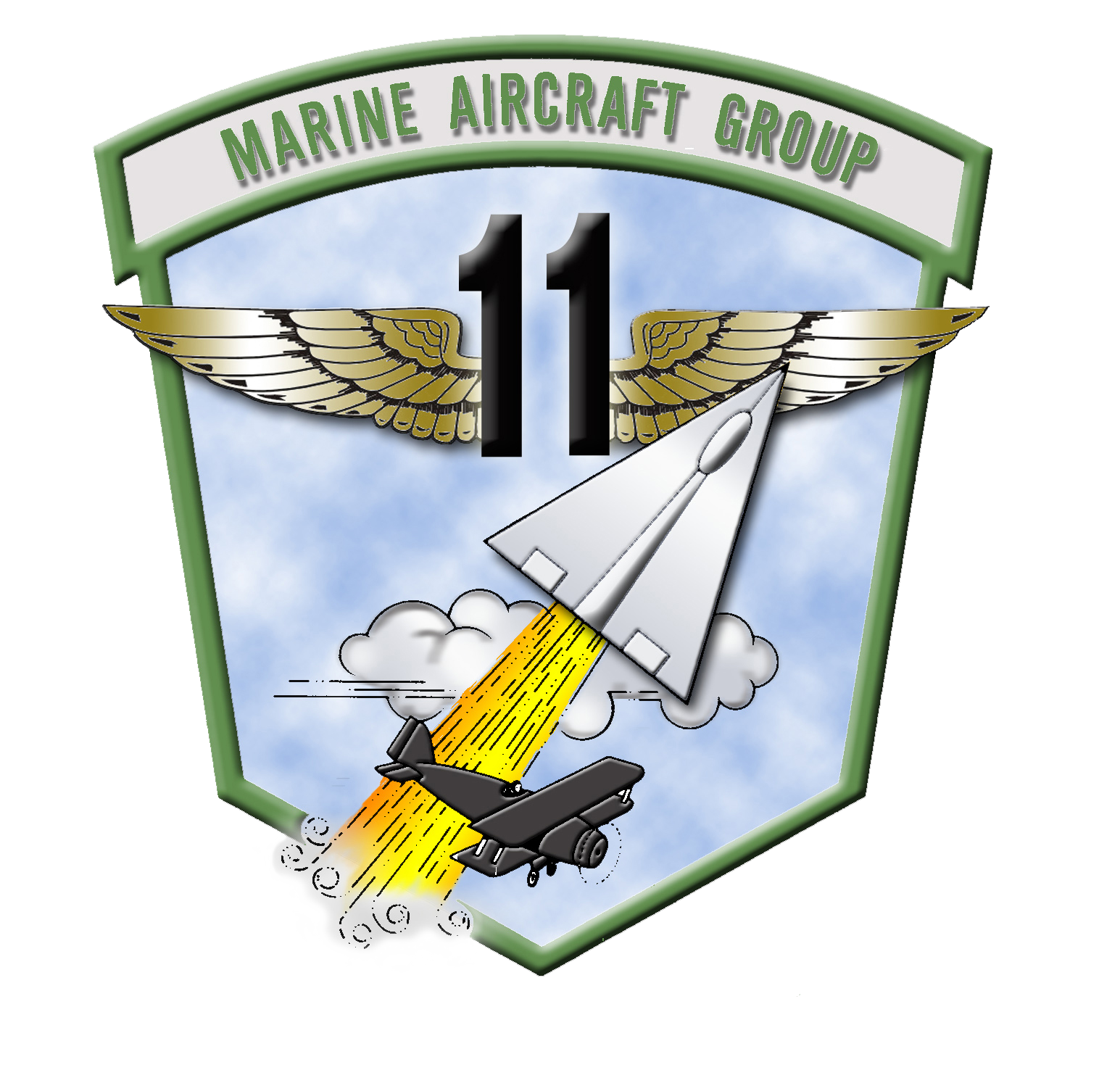

Squadron Name	Insignia	Nickname
Marine Aviation Logistics Squadron 11		Devilfish
Marine Fighter Attack Squadron 232		Red Devils
Marine Fighter Attack Squadron 311		Tomcats
Marine Fighter Attack Squadron 314		Black Knights
Marine Fighter Attack Squadron 323		Death Rattlers
Marine Aerial Refueler Transport Squadron 352		Raiders
Marine Fighter Attack Training Squadron 502		Flying Nightmares

==== Marine Aircraft Group 13 ====
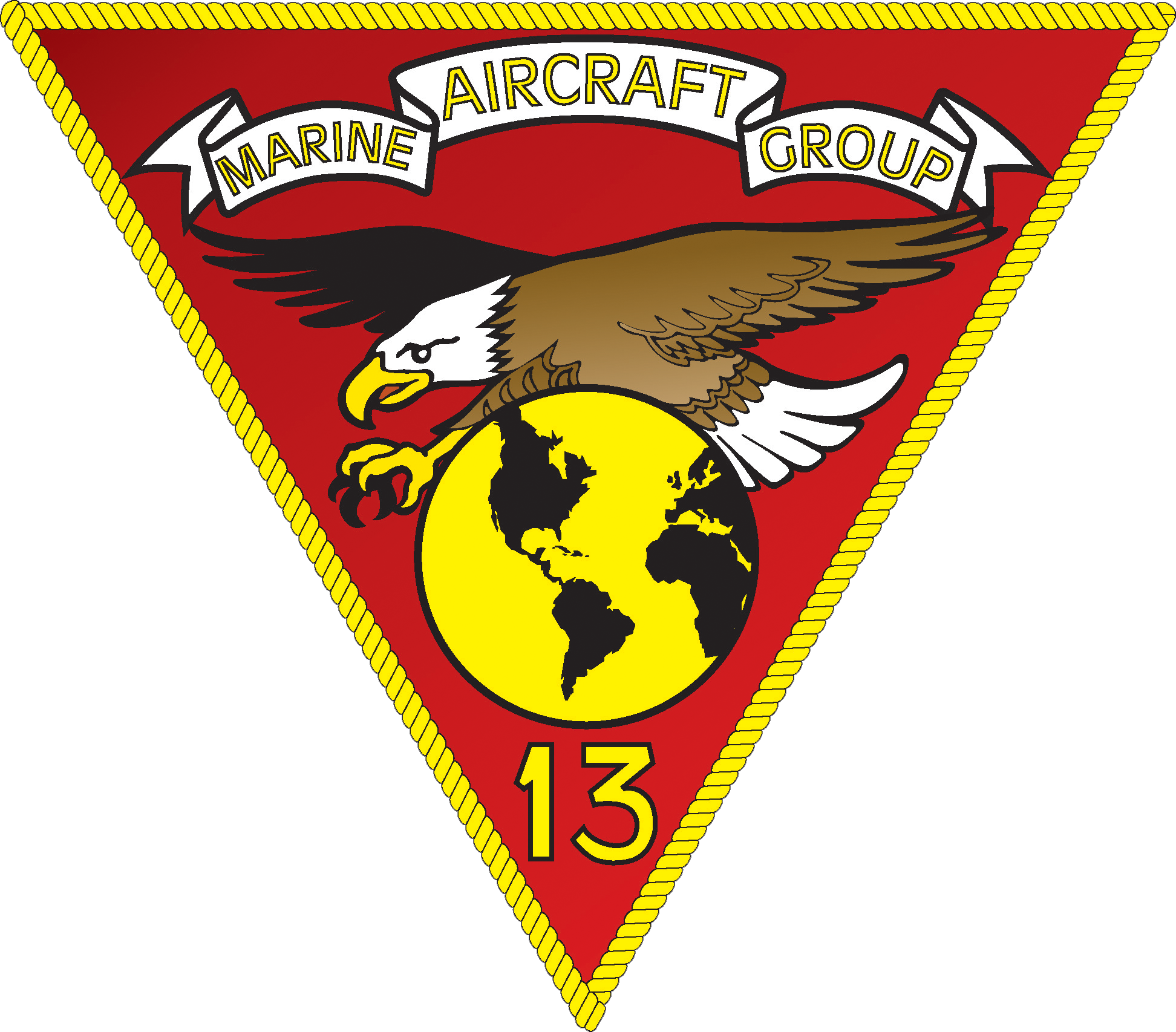

Squadron Name	Insignia	Nickname
Marine Aviation Logistics Squadron 13		Black Widows
Marine Fighter Attack Squadron 122		Werewolves
Marine Fighter Attack Squadron 211		Wake Island Avengers
Marine Fighter Attack Squadron 214		Black Sheep
Marine Fighter Attack Squadron 225		Vikings
Marine Unmanned Aerial Vehicle Squadron 1		Watchdogs

==== Marine Aircraft Group 16 ====
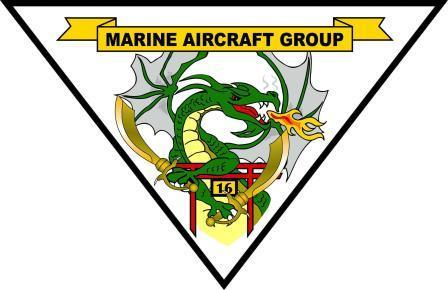

Squadron Name	Insignia	Nickname
Marine Aviation Logistics Squadron 16		Forerunners
Marine Medium Tiltrotor Squadron 161		Greyhawks
Marine Medium Tiltrotor Squadron 163		Ridge Runners
Marine Medium Tiltrotor Squadron 165		White Knights
Marine Heavy Helicopter Squadron 361		Flying Tigers
Marine Medium Tiltrotor Squadron 362		Ugly Angels
Marine Heavy Helicopter Squadron 462		Heavy Haulers
Marine Heavy Helicopter Squadron 465		Warhorse
Marine Heavy Helicopter Squadron 466		Wolfpack

==== Marine Aircraft Group 39 ====
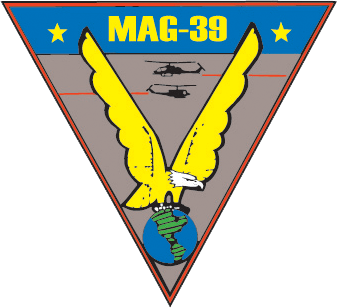

Squadron Name	Insignia	Nickname
Marine Aviation Logistics Squadron 39		Hellhounds
Marine Medium Tiltrotor Squadron 164		Knightriders
Marine Light Attack Helicopter Squadron 169		Vipers
Marine Light Attack Helicopter Squadron 267		Stingers
Marine Light Attack Training Squadron 303		Atlas
Marine Medium Tiltrotor Squadron 364		Purple Foxes
Marine Light Attack Helicopter Squadron 369		Gunfighters

==== Marine Air Control Group 38 ====
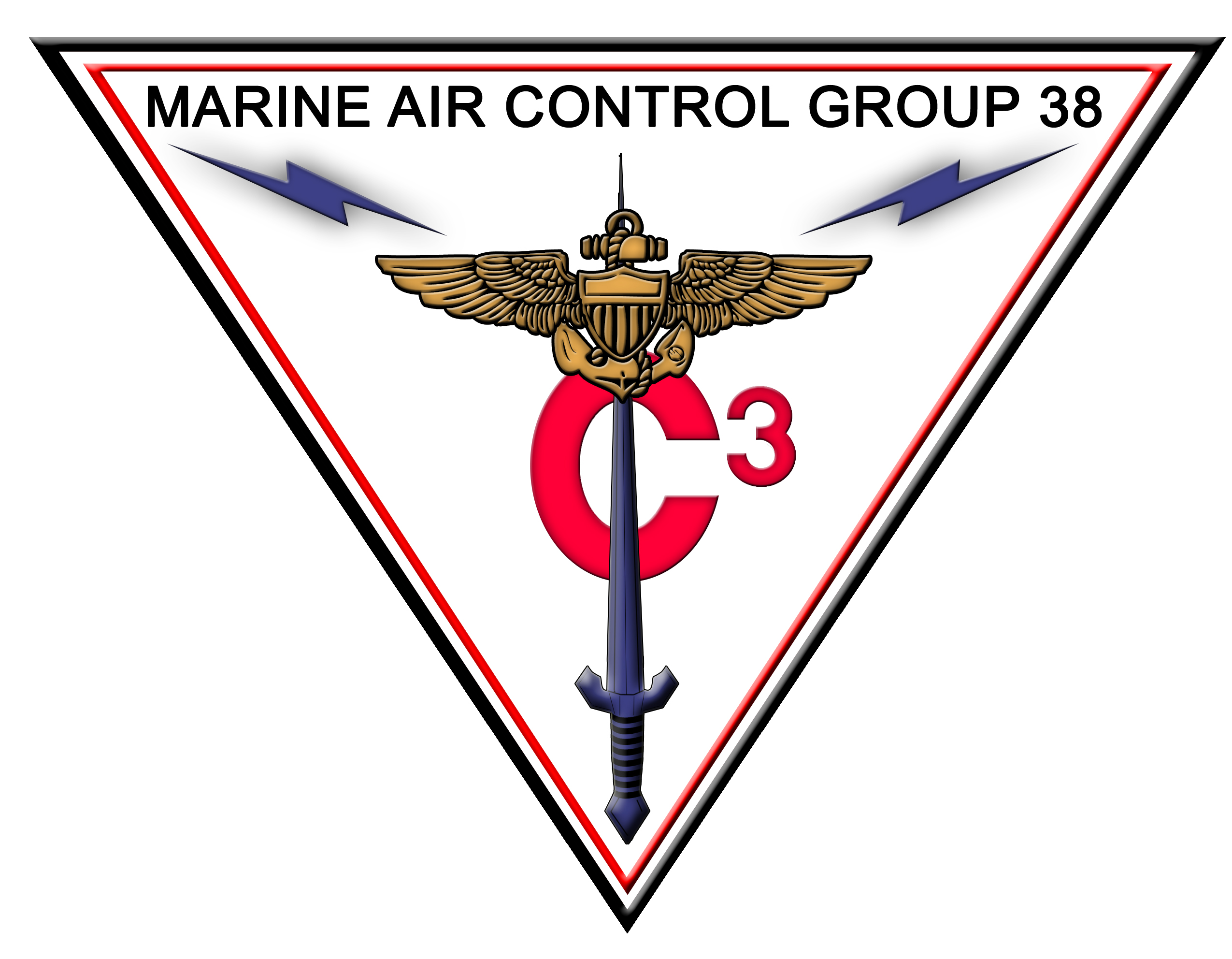

Squadron Name	Insignia	Nickname
3rd Low Altitude Air Defense Battalion		Stingers
Marine Air Control Squadron 1		Falconers
Marine Air Support Squadron 3		Blacklist
Marine Wing Communications Squadron 38		Red Lightning
Marine Wing Support Squadron 371		Sand Sharks
Marine Wing Support Squadron 372		Diamondbacks
Marine Wing Support Squadron 373		Ace Support
Marine Wing Support Squadron 374		Rhinos

=== 4th Marine Aircraft Wing ===
ACE of Marine Forces Reserve

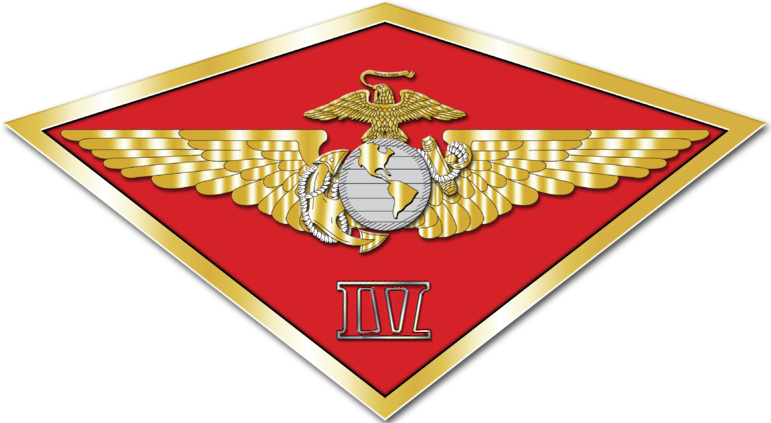

Squadron Name	Insignia	Nickname
4th Marine Aircraft Wing Training Support Group		

==== Marine Aircraft Group 41 ====

Squadron Name	Insignia	Nickname
Marine Aviation Logistics Squadron 41		Desperados
Marine Fighter Attack Squadron 112		Cowboys
Marine Aerial Refueler Transport Squadron 234		Rangers
Marine Fighter Training Squadron 401		Snipers
Marine Fighter Training Squadron 402		Grim Reapers
Marine Medium Helicopter Squadron 764		Moonlight
Marine Light Attack Helicopter Squadron 775		Coyote
Marine Unmanned Aerial Vehicle Squadron 4		Evil Eyes
Marine Wing Support Squadron 471		
Marine Wing Support Squadron 473		

==== Marine Aircraft Group 49 ====
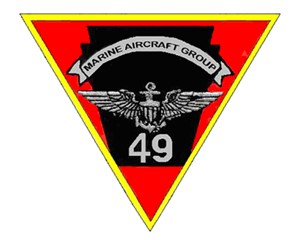

Squadron Name	Insignia	Nickname
Marine Aviation Logistics Squadron 49		Magicians
Marine Aerial Refueler Transport Squadron 452		Yankees
Marine Heavy Helicopter Squadron 772		Hustler
Marine Light Attack Helicopter Squadron 773		Red Dogs
Marine Medium Tiltrotor Squadron 774		Wild Goose
Marine Wing Support Squadron 472		Dragons

==== Marine Air Control Group 48 ====
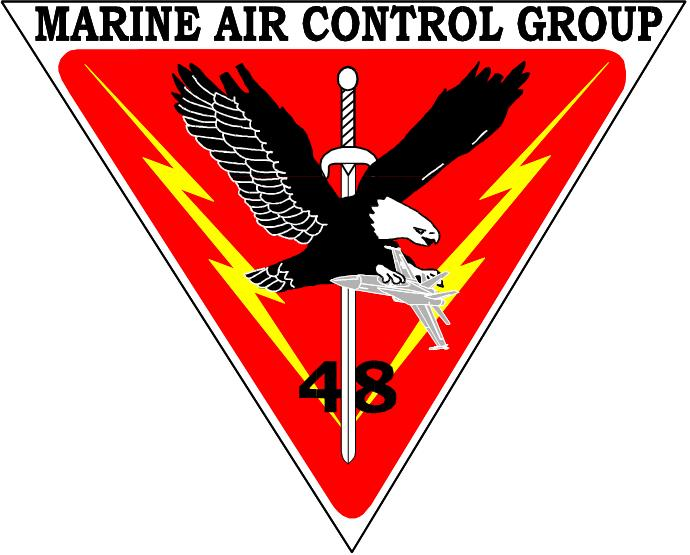

Squadron Name	Insignia	Nickname
Marine Tactical Air Command Squadron 48		
Marine Air Control Squadron 24		Earthquake
Marine Air Support Squadron 6		Lighthouse
Marine Wing Communications Squadron 48		Roar

== See also ==
- Marine Air-Ground Task Force
- United States Marine Corps Aviation
- List of United States Marine Corps aircraft wings
- List of United States Marine Corps aircraft groups
- List of active United States Marine Corps aircraft squadrons
- List of inactive United States Marine Corps aircraft squadrons
- List of United States Marine Corps aviation support units
