= Marine Aviation Logistics Squadron 41 =

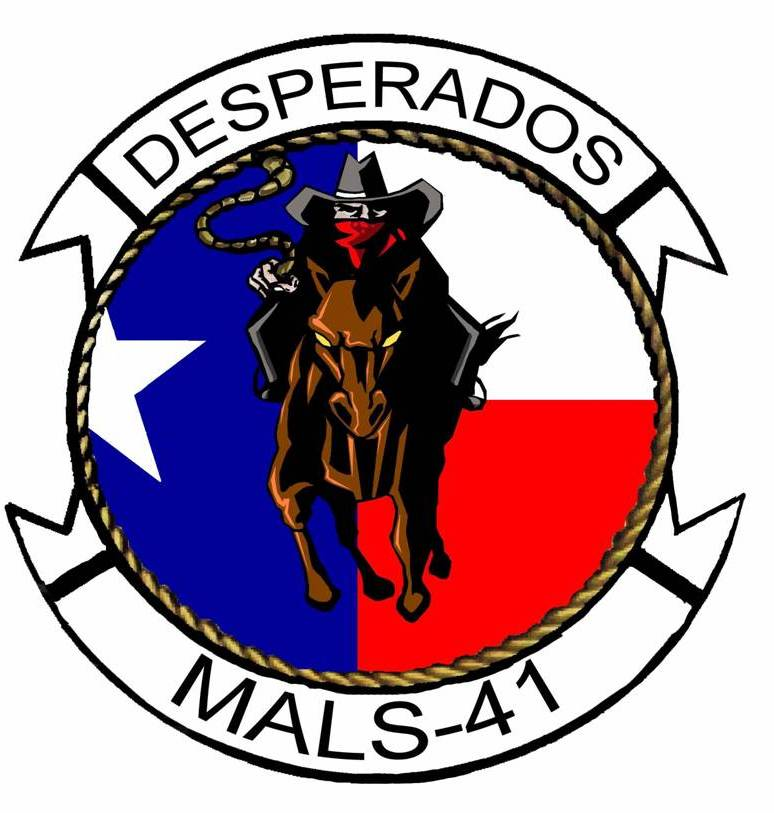
- MALS-41 Insignia
- Active: 1 January 1943 – 31 October 1945; 1 July 1962 – present
- Country: United States
- Allegiance: United States of America
- Branch: United States Marine Corps
- Type: Logistics
- Role: Aviation logistics support
- Part of: Marine Aircraft Group 41; 4th Marine Aircraft Wing
- Garrison/HQ: Naval Air Station Joint Reserve Base Fort Worth
- Nickname: Desperados
- Motto: "Let's Go!"
- Engagements: Operation Desert Storm; Operation Enduring Freedom; Operation Iraqi Freedom

Commanders
- Current commander: LtCol Ashley M. Noreuil
- Sergeant_Major: John E. Brodie

Marine Aviation Logistics Squadron 41 (MALS-41) is a reserve aviation logistics support unit of the United States Marine Corps. They fall under the command of Marine Aircraft Group 41 and 4th Marine Aircraft Wing and are currently based at Naval Air Station Joint Reserve Base Fort Worth. MALS-41 provides intermediate level maintenance support to VMFA-112 and VMGR-234 with an additional detachment (Det A) in MCAS Miramar supporting VMM-764.

== Mission ==
Be a combat multiplier by safely training, organizing, and deploying Marines to provide logistical support to F/A-18, KC-130, C-40 and MV-22 squadrons assigned to Fourth Marine Aircraft Wing and Commander, Naval Air Reserve Force. Augment Active Duty forces with personnel and equipment as directed.

== History ==
=== World War II ===
Marine Aviation Logistics Squadron 41 (MALS-41) was originally designated as ‘’'Headquarters and Maintenance Squadron 41'’’ (H&MS-41) and was activated as an administrative and aircraft maintenance squadron for Marine Base Defense Aircraft Group 41, Marine Fleet Air, West Coast, at Marine Corps Air Station El Toro, California on 1 January 1943. In November 1943, The squadron was reassigned to Marine Aircraft Group 41 and served honorably through the end of World War II when it was deactivated on 31 October 1945.

=== Reactivation through the 1990s ===
H&MS-41 was reactivated on 1 July 1962 at Naval Air Station Dallas, Texas, and assigned to Marine Aircraft Group 41, Marine Forces Reserve. In February 1965 the squadron was reassigned to the 4th Marine Aircraft Wing.

During the Vietnam War, H&MS-41 served in direct support of the flying squadrons, VMF-111 and VMF-112. By August 1963, they made the transition into supersonic flight with the F-8 Crusader. VMF-111 and her sister squadron VMF-112, were the first Marine Reserve squadrons to acquire the F-8A, due in large measure to their proximity to the Vought plant in Grand Prairie, Texas, where the Crusader was manufactured. In 1976, H&MS-41 assisted in the VMF(AW)-112 squadron upgrade to the McDonnell Douglas F-4N Phantom II, which re-designated them as Marine Fighter Attack Squadron 112 (VMFA-112).

In January 1989, H&MS-41 was redesignated as Marine Aviation Logistics Squadron 41. The squadron's mission was to provide maintenance and logistical support for VMFA-112. From August 1990 to October 1991, MALS-41 participated in Operation Desert Shield and Operation Desert Storm, in Saudi Arabia and Kuwait in Southwest Asia. MALS-41 Marines deployed as augments in support of combat operations in the theater of operations. In October 1996, MALS-41 moved to Naval Air Station Joint Reserve Base Fort Worth, Texas, and has successfully integrated with the United States Navy by working side by side with Aircraft Intermediate Maintenance Department (AIMD) Fort Worth.

=== Global war on terror ===
Following the events of 11 September 2001, MALS-41 began participating in worldwide operations in support of the Global War on Terrorism (GWOT), Operation Enduring Freedom (OEF), Operation Iraqi Freedom (OIF), and Combined Joint Task Force - Horn of Africa (CJTF-HOA). Many of the reserve Marines volunteered for activation in order to deploy or to augment the active duty in garrison for on-site support.

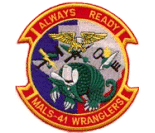
Old squadron logo

In late 2001, MALS-41 supported VMGR-234 as the reserve KC-130T squadron was activated and sustained combat flight operations in Afghanistan. They continued direct flight operations for OEF based from Kuwait and operations for OIF out of Iraq. The squadron and the MALS-41 augments returned from deployment in October 2003 and remained activated until late 2004. Additionally, MALS-41 led and managed a KC-130 engine and propeller build shop from Sigonella, Italy, significantly reducing engine and prop turnaround time.

In 2004, MALS-41 augmented VMFA-112 with 55 Marines when they were the first Reserve F/A-18 Hornet squadron to deploy on a Western Pacific exercise since the Korean War. They supported Operation Jungle Shield and Exercise Southern Frontier while operating out of Japan, Guam, and Australia.

In 2005, the Wranglers again augmented VMFA-112 in support of Battle Griffin in Norway for multi-national exercises and NATO training in the United Kingdom. Also, in 2005 Marines from MALS-41 were deployed with the reserve Hornet squadron from Atlanta, Georgia, for combat flight operations out of Al Asad, Iraq. VMFA-142 was the first reserve Hornet Squadron activated for combat operations and MALS-41 answered the call to augment and deploy.

== Awards ==
- World War II Victory Streamer
- American Campaign Streamer
- Navy Unit Commendation Streamer
- Meritorious Unit Commendation Streamer with three bronze stars
- Southwest Asia Service Streamer
- National Defense Service Streamer one bronze star
- Global War on Terrorism Service Streamer

== See also ==
- United States Marine Corps Aviation
- Organization of the United States Marine Corps
- List of United States Marine Corps aviation support units
