= Marine Wing Support Squadron 473 =

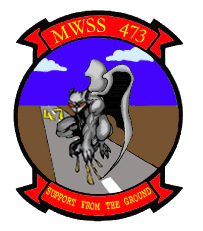
- MWSS-473's insignia
- Country: United States
- Allegiance: United States of America
- Branch: United States Marine Corps
- Type: Aviation ground support squadron
- Part of: Marine Aircraft Group 41; 4th Marine Aircraft Wing
- Garrison/HQ: Marine Corps Air Station Miramar
- Nickname: The Gargoyles
- Motto: Support From the Ground
- Engagements: Operation Iraqi Freedom Operation Enduring Freedom

Commanders
- Current commander: LtCol Christopher Chase

Marine Wing Support Squadron 473 (MWSS-473) is a reserve aviation ground support unit of the United States Marine Corps. They are headquartered at Marine Corps Air Station Miramar, California with Detachment A at Naval Air Station Lemoore, California and Detachment B at Naval Air Station Fort Worth, Texas. The squadron is part of Marine Aircraft Group 41 and the 4th Marine Aircraft Wing.

== Mission ==
Provide all essential Aviation Ground Support requirements to a designated fixed-wing and rotor-wing components of an Aviation Combat Element (ACE) and all supporting or attached elements of the Marine Air Control Group.

== History ==
=== 1980s & 1990s ===
During Desert Shield, the unit which was then based partly at Naval Air Station South Weymouth, Massachusetts, deployed to Marine Corps Air Station El Toro, California (in place of summer training) to replace deploying active-duty Marines. The unit later spent several months at Marine Corps Air Station Cherry Point, North Carolina.

=== Operations in Iraq and Afghanistan ===
MWSS-473 completed an eight-month deployment in Afghanistan in 2004–2005. The unit was composed of selected personnel from all three of the squadron's detachments. During their deployment unit, they fueled and loaded helicopters at various bases on the eastern end of Afghanistan. The unit also participated in humanitarian aid missions around Afghanistan. Notably, the squadrons fuel section was in charge of securing, filtering, and refueling helicopters and vehicles, heavy equipment was tasked with loading helicopters with ammunition and supplies. The unit experienced various rocket and mortar fire and did not sustain any casualties during the deployment.

The squadron was re-activated in May 2007 and spent June at Marine Corps Air Station Yuma, Arizona and the rest of the summer at Marine Corps Base Camp Pendleton, California completing pre-deployment training.

They deployed in September 2007 to Al Asad Airbase in western Iraq. They sent detachments at Al Qa'im, Rawah, and Mudyasis. They returned in April 2008 after a seven-month deployment.

== See also ==
- United States Marine Corps Aviation
- Organization of the United States Marine Corps
- List of United States Marine Corps aviation support units
