= VMR-1 =

US Marine Corps squadron

Marine Transport Squadron 1
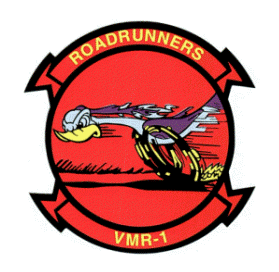
- VMR-1 Insignia
- Active: 16 July 1941 - Present
- Country: United States
- Branch: USMC
- Type: Medium Transport
- Role: Fleet Logistical Support
- Nickname: Roadrunners
- Engagements: Operation Desert Storm

Commanders
- Commanding Officer: LtCol Travis P. Geletzke

Marine Transport Squadron 1 is a medium transport aircraft squadron of the United States Marine Corps. Also known as the "Roadrunners", the squadron is based at Naval Air Station Joint Reserve Base Fort Worth, Texas and falls under the command of Marine Aircraft Group 41 and the 4th Marine Aircraft Wing.

== Mission ==
Provide assault support in the form of air logistics. Specifically, VMR-1 provides time, place, or mission sensitive, long range, multipurpose air transport and critical logistical support of key personnel and cargo between and within combatant commands and theaters of war, as well as to various other Department of Defense units.

== History ==
Station Operations and Engineering Squadron (SOES), Marine Corps Air Station Cherry Point, North Carolina was conceived on 16 July 1941, when the United States Congress approved the purchase of a tract of land in the vicinity of the Neuse River in Craven County, North Carolina. On 18 March 1942, Colonel T. J. Cushman initiated flight operations at Cherry Point when he made the first aircraft landing at Cunningham Field. This was the real beginning of MCAS Cherry Point's flight operations and a very important moment in the development of SOES.

Aircraft Engineering Squadron 46 (AES-46) was commissioned on 6 January 1943 at Marine Corps Air Station Cherry Point. With over 1000 Marines, AES-46 was the largest aviation squadron in the Marine Corps and performed myriad airfield support operations. Among its assigned missions, AES-46 was responsible for transportation of personnel and equipment on the air station, Air Traffic Control, towing of targets for anti-aircraft gunnery practice, maintenance of station and visiting aircraft, station communications, ordnance related activities, and care of the base magazine areas. Other support divisions manned by AES-46 Marines included airfield operations; crash, fire, and recovery; and station photo lab.

On 1 October 1951, the various responsibilities of AES-46 were redistributed between Station Operations Squadron (SOS-2) and Station Airfield Engineering Squadron (SAES-2). SOS-2 assumed the responsibilities for station operations, communications, crash crew, and photo lab; while SAES-2 Marines manned the engineering, rifle range, and ordnance sections. On 24 February 1954, Station Operations and Engineering Squadron was activated and assumed most of the special and technical activities originally performed by AES-46.

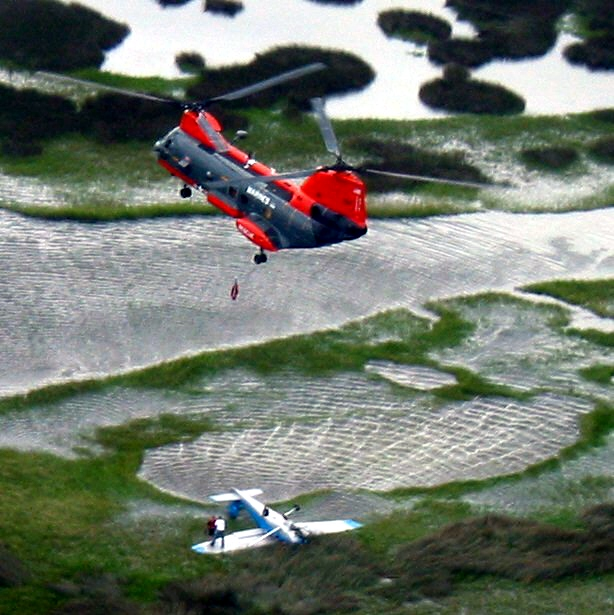
VMR-1's SAR crew assist a downed aircraft.

During 1979, SOES relinquished many of the duties previously assigned to itself and the former AES-46 to become responsible primarily for the operation and maintenance of its assigned aircraft. SOES was redesignated as Marine Transport Squadron One (VMR-1) in 1997 and remains a unique Marine Corps asset that operates two C-9B Skytrains, two UC-35D Cessna Encores, and three HH-46D Seaknight helicopters. The squadron operates its C-9B and UC-35 aircraft in myriad missions dealing with cargo and troop movement, in addition to the transportation of military and civilian dignitaries. Affectionately referred to operationally as "Pedro", the HH-46D is primarily used for Search and Rescue (SAR) missions by MCAS Cherry Point and the United States Coast Guard when extended searches in eastern North Carolina are required. This helicopter will be replaced in late 2007 by an updated HH-46E version that incorporates enhanced capabilities and performance characteristics.

In February 1990, VMR-1 became the first Marine aviation unit to fly to the former Soviet Union when the squadron transported the United States Marine Corps Band to Moscow. From August 1990 through 1991, the squadron flew nearly 2000 hours moving troops and cargo in and out of the Middle East in direct support of Operations Desert Shield and Desert Storm. After Hurricane Floyd in September 1999, "Pedro" rescued 399 people directly threatened by the floods that followed and provided logistical support with emergency delivery of water and food supplies to volunteer workers and isolated communities throughout Eastern North Carolina.

In December 2017, VMR-1 moved from Cherry Point, NC to NAS JRB Fort Worth, TX. The Roadrunners have transitioned to the C-40A aircraft and currently have two in their inventory. VMR-1 is expected to reach Full Operational Capability in 2025.

== Unit awards ==
- Meritorious Unit Commendation Streamer with four bronze stars
- Coast Guard Meritorious Unit Commendation Streamer with operational device
- National Defense Service Streamer with two bronze stars.
- Chief of Naval Operations Aviation Safety Award in 1990, 1991, 1993, 1995, 1996, 1997, 1998, 1999, 2000, 2001, 2002, 2003, 2004, 2005 and 2006
- Marine Corps Commandant's Aviation Efficiency Trophy - 1994
- Commandant of the Marine Corps Certificate of Commendation - 2000
- Joint Operational Support Airlift Center (JOSAC) Unit of the Year (Large Jet Category) - 2000, 2002

== Aircraft ==
VMR-1 has the following aircraft:

- 2 Boeing C-40A Clipper

== See also ==
- List of active United States Marine Corps aircraft squadrons
- United States Marine Corps Aviation
