= Clyde Vermilyea =

United States Marine Corps general

- Born: February 19, 1937 (age 89); Wheatland, Wyoming, U.S.
- Military career
- Allegiance: United States
- Branch: United States Marine Corps
- Service years: 1955–1993
- Rank: Major general
- Nickname: Jake
- Commands: 4th Marine Aircraft Wing; Marine Corps Air Station Cherry Point

Clyde L. Vermilyea (born February 19, 1937) was a major general in the United States Marine Corps who served as commanding general of 4th Marine Aircraft Wing and Marine Corps Air Station Cherry Point.
