= Marine Aircraft Group 41 =

- MAG-41 Insignia
- Active: 1 January 1943 - present
- Country: United States
- Allegiance: United States of America
- Branch: United States Marine Corps
- Type: Fixed Wing Aircraft Group
- Role: Offensive Air Support; Antiair Warfare; Aerial Reconnaissance; Assault Support
- Size: 2,000+ Marines
- Part of: 4th Marine Aircraft Wing; Marine Forces Reserve
- Garrison/HQ: Naval Air Station Joint Reserve Base Fort Worth
- Engagements: World War II; Operation Enduring Freedom; Operation Iraqi Freedom

Commanders
- Current commander: Col. Thomas B. Lee
- Notable commanders: Col John F. Goodman

Marine Aircraft Group 41 (MAG-41) is a United States Marine Corps reserve aviation unit based at Naval Air Station Joint Reserve Base Fort Worth, Texas that is currently composed of one F/A-18C squadron, one KC-130J squadron, one C-40 squadron, two Northrop F-5 aggressor squadron based at Marine Corps Air Station Yuma, Arizona and Marine Corps Air Station Beaufort, South Carolina, one Marine Light Attack Helicopter Squadron at MCAS Camp Pendleton, one MV-22B squadron based at MCAS Miramar, one aviation logistics squadron and two wing support squadrons with multiple detachments throughout the United States.

== Mission ==
Train, man, equip, and sustain an expeditionary aviation combat element (ACE), Combined Forces Air Component Commander (CFACC) element, an aviation logistics squadron, a fighter-attack squadron, a fighter adversary squadron and an aerial refueler/assault support squadron in order to deploy/employ as a MAG/ACE, a special purpose Marine Air-Ground Task Force (MAGTF), or any combination of capabilities in support of MAGTF or Joint/Combined Warfare.

== Subordinate units ==
Fixed Wing Squadrons

- VMFA-112
- VMGR-234
- VMFT-401
- VMFT-402
- VMR-1

Tiltrotor Squadron

- VMM-764

Helicopter Squadron

- HMLA-775

Aviation Support Squadrons

- Marine Aviation Logistics Squadron 41
- Marine Wing Support Squadron 471
- Marine Wing Support Squadron 473

Site Supports

- Site Support Pendleton (MAG-41 Det A)
- Site Support Miramar (MAG-41 Det B)
- Site Support Fort Worth
- Site Support Minneapolis
- Site Support Lemoore
- Site Support Selfridge
- Site Support Johnstown

== History ==
=== World War II ===
Marine Base Defense Group 41 was first organized in the Fleet Marine Force on 1 January 1943, at MCAS El Toro, California. With need for support in the growing war in the Pacific, on 10 November 1944, it received the designation Marine Aircraft Group 41, with the mission "…to administer and supervise training and activities of attached squadrons for combat in the Pacific." Originally, there was only a headquarters, service and single fighter squadron in the group, but as the scope of Marine aviation in World War II grew, MAG-41 simultaneously expanded to include six tactical squadrons and a maintenance squadron, now Marine Aviation Logistics Squadron 41.

Because of the shortage of aircraft carriers early in the war, land-based Marine air was used to neutralize by-passed enemy bases in the Central Pacific. As an ever-increasing number of escort carriers became available, it was decided Marine planes would be placed on board. In 1944, MAG-41 training to subordinate squadrons included carrier duty and the further development of close air support for the Marines on the ground. MAG-41 was the first Marine aviation unit to receive and train with the Curtiss SB2C Helldiver. By the end of the war, the group had trained nearly twenty fighter, dive bomber and torpedo squadrons for combat and held the distinction of having the largest squadron in Marine aviation history.

With the war over, MAG-41 officially deactivated in October 1945, but with the new doctrine of carrier-based aircraft being set, Marine aviation would go on to become an integral part of future amphibious operations.

=== 1960s ===
On 1 July 1962, the group was reactivated as part of 4th Marine Aircraft Wing at Naval Air Station Dallas, and designated a Marine Air Reserve Training Detachment (MARTD). At that time MAG-41 consisted of three fighter squadrons, (VMF-111, VMF-112, VMF-413,) and two medium helicopter squadrons, (HMM-777, HMM-762). The fighter squadrons flew the FJ-4B and AF-1E Fury, while the helicopter squadrons flew the UH-34 Seahorse. The following year, VMF-413 and HMM-762 were deactivated. By August 1963, VMF-111 and VMF-112 made the leap into supersonic flight with the F-8A Crusader. Vought, the manufacturer of the Crusader, had a plant adjacent to the runway of NAS Dallas, making the transition more than convenient for squadron pilots and support personnel.

On 22 October 1965, VMF-111 was deactivated with personnel and aircraft to be absorbed by VMF-112. In July 1967, the unit formally known as the "Wolf Pack," from its glory days of World War II with 140 kills in the Pacific, changed its name to the "Cowboys," and redesigned the squadron insignia to reflect the local Dallas Cowboys NFL team.

=== 1970s ===
In 1970, another Crusader squadron, VMJ-4, flying the photoreconnaissance version of the fighter, the RF-8G, joined the unit. The unit eventually received reworked models of the Crusader, the F-8K, and later, the F-8H in 1971. With the added allweather capability of the F-8H, VMF-112 was redesignated VMF(AW)-112 on 1 November 1971. The squadron continued to operate various models of the F-8 until the McDonnell F-4 Phantom II replaced the aircraft. When the squadron began to acquire the F-4, it was re-designated as Marine Fighter Attack Squadron 112 (VMFA-112) in 1983.

In 1972, the "Flying Armadillos" of HMM-777 traded their aging UH-34Ds for the CH-53A Sea Stallion and was redesignated as a heavy Marine helicopter squadron (HMH). HMH-777 was deactivated due to massive budget cuts in 1980, however, on 1 October 1980, the squadron's personnel and aircraft were reformed as the Bravo Detachment of HMH-772, which was based at NAS JRB Willow Grove, Pennsylvania. For the next thirteen years, the Dallas detachment supported 4th MAW, including a deployment to Okinawa in support of Desert Storm, yet in 1993 the Reserve heavy-lift squadrons were realigned, and both HMH-772 detachments were deactivated. Det Alpha was reactivated as HMH-769, but HMH-777 was not so lucky. On 1 April 1993, HMH-772, Det Bravo, retired the squadron colors in a brief ceremony to close the final chapter on the "Flying Armadillos" and what has, so far, been the final chapter of rotary aircraft in MAG-41.

=== 1990s ===
Although MAG-41 was proud to have the last Phantom II squadron in the Marine Corps, a change was needed to propel the group into the twenty-first century. On 28 February 1992, VMFA-112 retired the last F-4S to Carswell AFB, and in July received their first McDonnell Douglas F/A-18A Hornet. MAG-41 hosted a "Phinal Phantom Pharewell" celebration to bid a last farewell to their F-4S aircraft, and invited Marine Phantom enthusiasts from all over the Corps to participate in the tribute. In the coming months more Hornets began to appear on the "Cowboy" flightline until the squadron received their entire complement of 11 "A" models and one two-seating "B" model. On 8 October 1992, Capt Joe "Crop" Riley flew the first Hornet sortie for the "Cowboys".

VMFA-112 has since reconfigured its aircraft to the F/A-18A+ platform. The aircraft have undergone improvements in radar, navigation, and night vision systems. VMFA-112 has also worked alongside Naval Air Weapons Station China Lake, California, testing the AIM-9X Sidewinder as well as the Joint Direct Attack Munition (JDAM). In August 1994, MAG-41 gained a squadron of 14 KC-130T Hercules, when Marine Aerial Refueler Transport Squadron 234 was reassigned from the former NAS Glenview, Illinois when that installation was closed due to Base Realignment and Closure action. After the move the group quickly gained the title of the "Rangers" from the Major League Baseball team located minutes away in Arlington, Texas. Within months of their arrival to Dallas, VMGR-234 surpassed 73,000 accident-free flight hours.

=== 2000s ===
Many of MAG-41's units deployed for the War in Afghanistan (2001-2021) and the War in Iraq (2003–2011). In 2009 helicopters returned to MAG-41 when they took over responsibility for HMM-764 Moonlight after MAG-46 cased its colors. HMM-764 transitioned from the CH-46E Sea Knights (Phrogs Phoever) to MV-22B Ospreys in January 2013 bringing tiltrotors to the Marine Reserve Aviation for the first time.

== See also ==
- List of United States Marine Corps aircraft groups
- List of United States Marine Corps aircraft squadrons
