= VMFA-112 =

Marine Fighter Attack Squadron 112
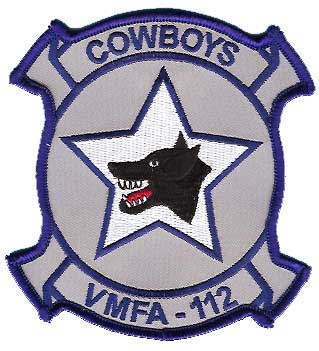
- VMFA-112 Insignia
- Active: 1 March 1942 - 10 September 1945; 1 July 1946 - present
- Country: United States
- Branch: United States Marine Corps
- Type: Fighter/Attack
- Role: Close air support Armed Reconnaissance; Active Air Defense
- Part of: Marine Aircraft Group 41; 4th Marine Aircraft Wing
- Nickname: Cowboys
- Tail Code: MA
- Mascot: Wolf
- Engagements: World War II; Battle of Guadalcanal; Korean War; Operation Iraqi Freedom

Commanders
- Commanding Officer: LtCol Robert J. Lundgren
- Executive Officer: LtCol Christopher W. Paulin

Aircraft flown
- Fighter: Grumman F4F Wildcat; Vought F4U-1 Corsair; Grumman F9F Panther; Vought F8U-1 Crusader; McDonnell-Douglas F-4 Phantom II; McDonnell-Douglas F/A-18A++, F/A-18C+ Hornet

Marine Fighter Attack Squadron 112 (VMFA-112) is a reserve United States Marine Corps McDonnell-Douglas F/A-18 Hornet squadron. The squadron is based at NASJRB Fort Worth, Texas and falls under the command of Marine Aircraft Group 41 (MAG-41), 4th Marine Aircraft Wing (4th MAW). Their tail code is MA. During World War II the squadron saw extensive action throughout the Pacific Theater of Operations especially at the Battle of Guadalcanal as part of the Cactus Air Force. By the end of the war, its 140 air-to-air kills ranked it third among Marine Corps squadrons.

== Mission ==
Conduct of Air-to-Air and Air-to-Ground operations in support of the Marine rifleman.

== History ==
=== World War II ===
Marine Fighter Attack Squadron 112, was originally activated as VMF-112, at San Diego, California on 1 March 1942.

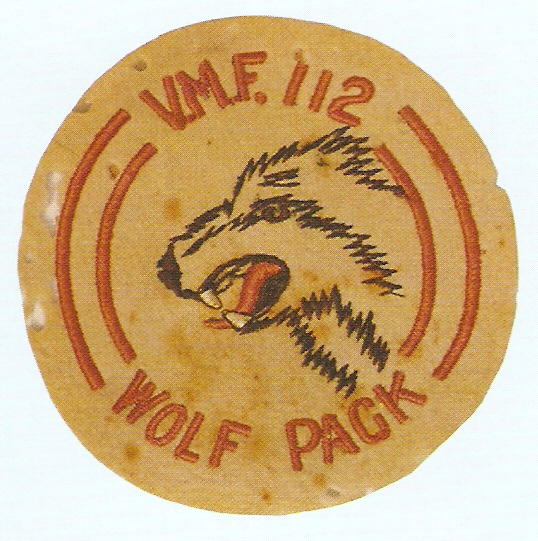
Original VMF-112 Squadron Patch

Deploying shortly after to Henderson Field on Guadalcanal in the Solomon Islands in their Grumman F4F Wildcats, the Wolfpack joined the Cactus Air Force with Marine Aircraft Group 11. On 31 January 1943 Jefferson J. DeBlanc downed five enemy aircraft in a single mission, and was awarded the Medal of Honor for this action. In recognition of its valor and its contributions to victory during its service on Guadalcanal, VMF-112 was awarded the Presidential Unit Citation (US) for 7 August – 9 December 1942.

VMF-112 was withdrawn from Guadalcanal to Espiritu Santo for a respite. There it began to switch to the Vought F4U-1 Corsair, the aircraft that it would fly for the rest of World War II. VMF-112 returned to the United States on 5 September 1943 and took up duty at MCAS Miramar, outside of San Diego. It was there that VMF-112 was redesignated VMF(CVS)-112, denoting that the squadron was carrier qualified.

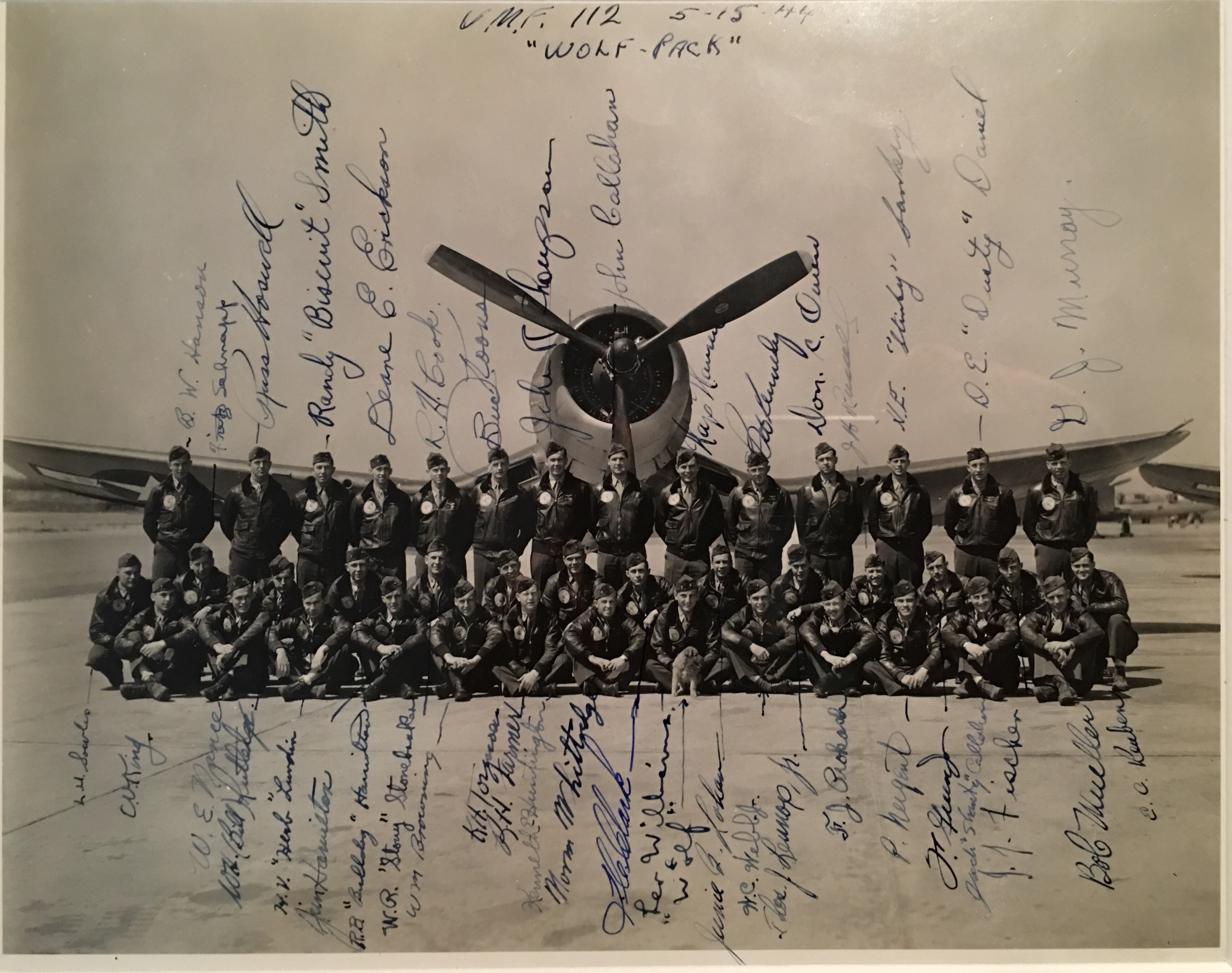

In December 1944, VMF-112 was assigned to Air Group 82 aboard USS Bennington for its second combat tour. In mid-May 1945, Lieutenant Robert Cook scored the only downing of a barrage balloon by a Marine squadron during the war when he shot one down over Kyūshū. By the completion of World War II, the Wolfpack was credited with the destruction of 140 Japanese aircraft in aerial combat, ranking it third among Marine Corps squadrons in terms of enemy aircraft destroyed. Following the surrender of Japan VMF-112 returned to the United States where it was deactivated on 10 September 1945.

=== Post World War II ===
The squadron was reactivated on 1 July 1946 as the Marine Air Detachment, Marine Air Reserve Training Command, Naval Air Station Dallas Dallas, Texas. VMF-112 was reactivated with the Corsair, but eventually flew the Grumman F9F Panther, the North American AF-1E Fury, and Vought F8U-1 Crusader.

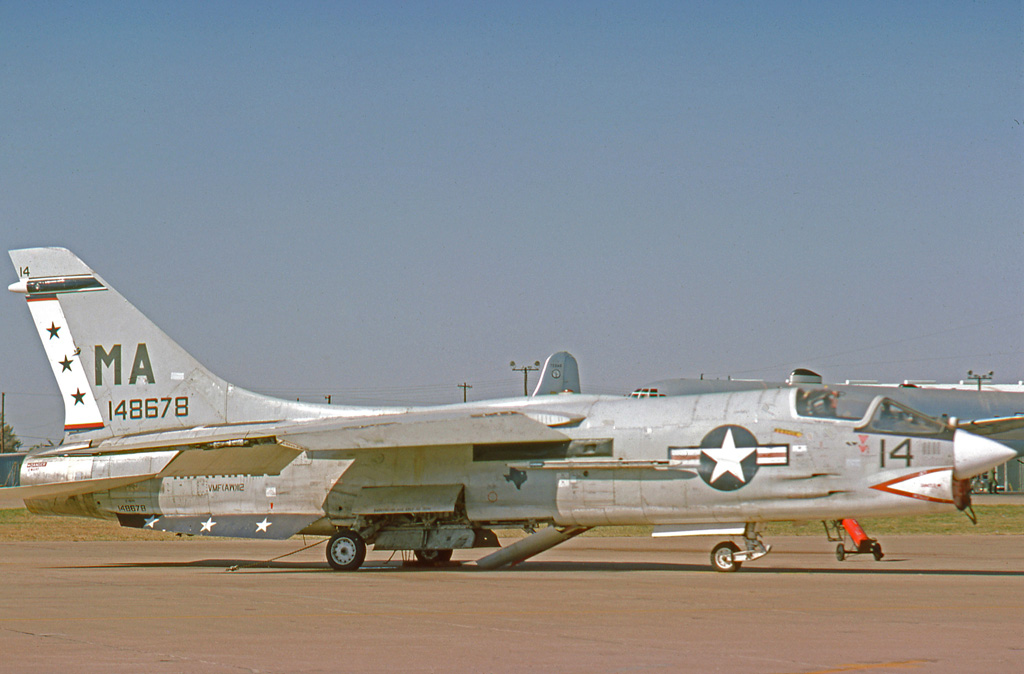
VMF(AW)-112 F-8H Crusader II at Dallas NAS in 1975

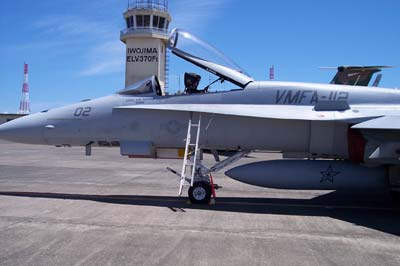
F/A-18 Hornet from VMFA-112 at Iwo Jima

When VMF-111 was deactivated, its aircraft passed to VMF-112, which became the Marines' largest reserve squadron. Upon receipt of the all-weather D/E model of the Crusader, the squadron was redesignated VMF(AW)-112 and flew several more versions of the F-8 until late 1975, when it switched to the McDonnell-Douglas F-4 Phantom II and was redesignated VMFA-112. On 18 January 1992, VMFA-112 retired the last active F-4S squadron in naval service (though some F-4 Phantom IIs remained in naval testing facilities after this). VMFA-112 flew the McDonnell-Douglas F/A-18A Hornet on their first official flight 8 October 1992. VMFA-112 moved to NAS Fort Worth Joint Reserve Base (JRB) in September 1996 and continues to operate there.

=== 2000 & beyond ===
In 2002, VMFA-112’s aircraft were reconfigured to the F/A-18A+ aircraft. The Cowboys were the first Reserve squadron to deploy on a Western-Pacific exercise since the Korean War. In the summer of 2004, the squadron supported Operation Jungle Shield and Exercise Southern Frontier while operating out of Japan, Guam and Australia. In 2005, VMFA-112 deployed to Oerland Main Air Station, Norway, for the multinational exercise: Battle Griffin. The exercise was conducted to enhance cohesive operations between multinational forces and hone air-to-ground combat skills. The Marines experienced cold weather and harsh conditions during the exercise.

Currently, VMFA-112 has been working closely with sister squadron VMGR-234 on what has been called the "Herc/Hornet Expeditionary Package." The conceptual program would allow an F/A-18A+ to land on a hastily constructed runway and refuel and rearm quickly without having to return to base, as is the current operating procedure. The program would be in keeping with the Marine Corps nature of self-sufficiency.

The squadron was deployed to Al Asad Air Base, Al Anbar Province, Iraq in late 2009. During their deployment, the Cowboys supported the ground withdrawal from the major cities in Iraq, supported special forces during numerous missions, and provided key aerial surveillance for intelligence. The squadron was the last fighter/attack squadron to leave Iraq closing that chapter on the Iraq War.

By Fiscal Year 2029, VMFA-112 is scheduled under the USMC Force Design 2030 Aviation Plan to begin conversion from their F/A-18's to F-35C aircraft.

== Squadron aces ==
- Archie Donahue – 14 kills
- Jefferson J. DeBlanc – 9 kills
- Robert B. Fraser – 6 kills
- James G. Percy – 6 kills
- Joseph B. Lynch – 5.5 kills
- John B. Maas – 5.5 kills
- Wallace E. Sigler – 5.33 kills
- Paul J. Fontana – 5 kills
- Wayne W. Laird – 5 kills
- Donald C. Owen – 5 kills
- Stanley T. Synar – 5 kills

== See also ==
- United States Marine Corps Aviation
- List of active United States Marine Corps aircraft squadrons
- List of inactive United States Marine Corps aircraft squadrons
