= Marine Wing Support Squadron 471 =

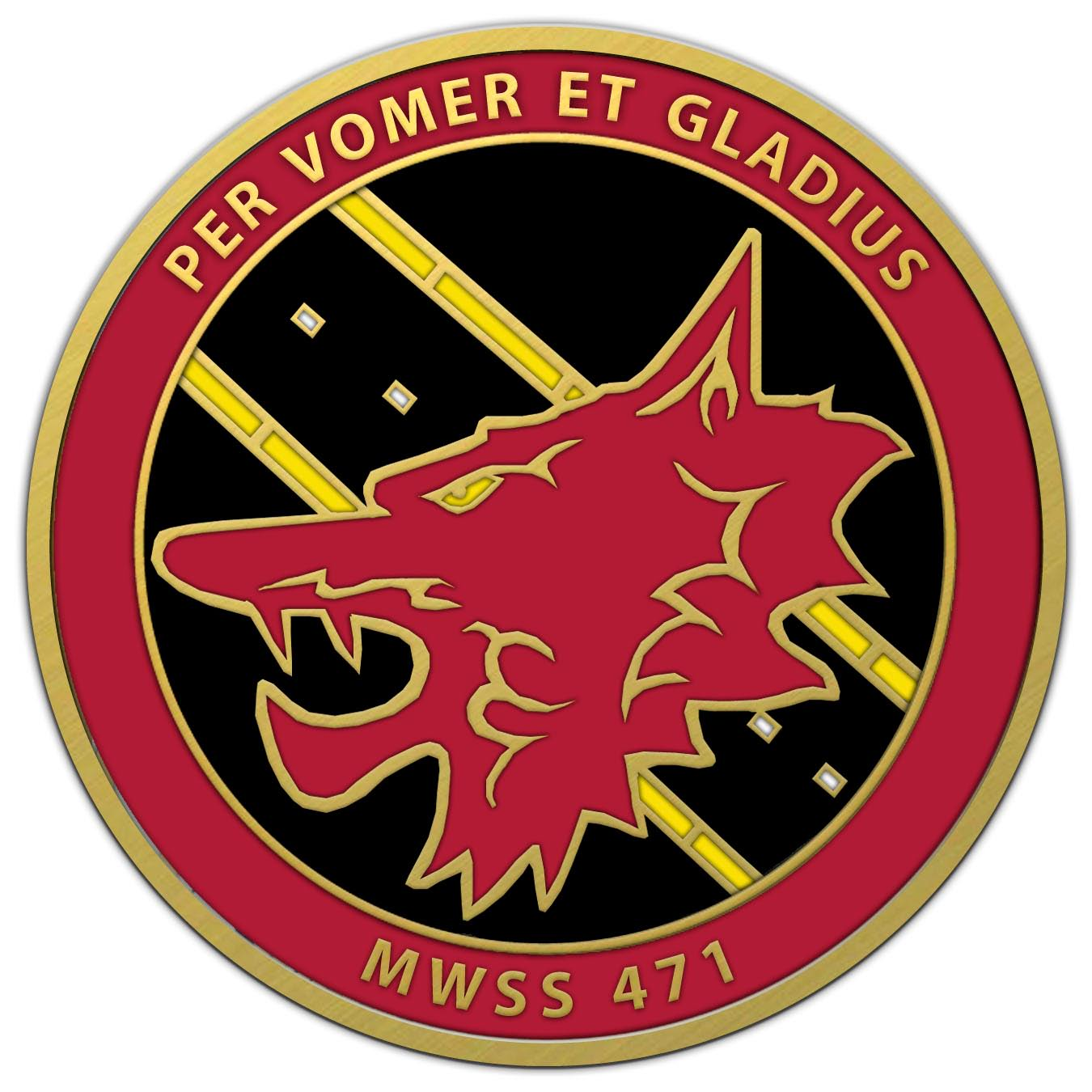
- MWSS-471's insignia
- Country: United States
- Allegiance: United States of America
- Branch: United States Marine Corps
- Type: Aviation ground support battalion
- Part of: Marine Aircraft Group 41; 4th Marine Aircraft Wing
- Garrison/HQ: Minneapolis, Minnesota
- Nickname(s): Red Wolves
- Motto(s): "Per Vomer Et Gladius" "By means of plow (share) and sword"
- Engagements: Operation Desert Storm; Operation Iraqi Freedom; Operation Enduring Freedom

Commanders
- Current commander: LtCol Curtis J. Rash

Marine Wing Support Squadron 471 (MWSS-471) is a United States Marine Corps Reserve aviation ground support unit. Nicknamed the "Red Wolves," the squadron headquarters is in Minneapolis, Minnesota with outlying detachments in Johnstown, Pennsylvania (Det A) and Selfridge Air National Guard Base, Michigan (Det B Engineer Company). The squadron falls under the command of Marine Aircraft Group 41 and the 4th Marine Aircraft Wing.

== Mission ==
Provide all essential Aviation Ground Support requirements to designated fixed-wing and rotary-wing components of an Aviation Combat Element (ACE) and all supporting or attached elements of the Marine Air Group.

== Gallery ==
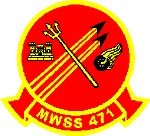
Old squadron insignia

== See also ==
- United States Marine Corps Aviation
- Organization of the United States Marine Corps
- List of United States Marine Corps aviation support units
