= HMLA-775 =

Marine Light Attack Helicopter Squadron 775
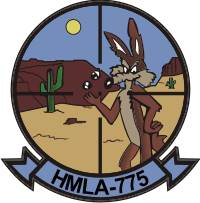
- HMLA-775 insignia
- Active: 2 September 1958 - 30 September 1962 7 January 1989 - 6 September 2008 1 October 2016 - Present
- Country: United States
- Allegiance: United States of America
- Branch: United States Marine Corps
- Type: Light/Attack squadron
- Role: Close air support Assault support Air interdiction Aerial reconnaissance
- Part of: Marine Aircraft Group 41; 4th Marine Aircraft Wing
- Garrison/HQ: Marine Corps Air Station Camp Pendleton
- Nickname: Coyotes
- Tail Code: WR
- Mascot: Coyote
- Engagements: Operation Desert Storm; Operation Iraqi Freedom * Operation Vigilant Resolve

Commanders
- 2025-Present: LtCol Jack "Chili" Guevara

Marine Light Attack Helicopter Squadron 775 (HMLA-775) is a reserve United States Marine Corps helicopter squadron consisting of Bell AH-1Z Viper attack helicopters and Bell UH-1Y Venom utility helicopters. The squadron was reactivated from cadre status on 1 Oct 2016 and is based at Marine Corps Base Camp Pendleton in California and falls under the command of Marine Aircraft Group 41 (MAG-41) and the 4th Marine Aircraft Wing (4th MAW).

The detachment/squadron team functioned in the same manner as that of its active duty counterparts minus the regular overseas deployments. To enhance the squadron's readiness and demonstrate its versatility, HMLA-775 also participated in anti-drug operations in conjunction with federal agencies in locations such as Key West, Florida; Puerto Rico; the Bahamas; California; Klamath, Oregon; and Jamaica.

== History ==
=== Early years ===
Marine Helicopter Transport Squadron 775 (HMR-775) was activated 2 September 1958 at Naval Air Station Niagara Falls, New York, and assigned to Marine Air Reserve Training Command. Initial strength at activation was 2 officers. HMR-775 relocated to NAS Willow Grove, effective 28 February 1959. During this period HMR-775 operated the Piasecki HUP-2 "Retriever".

HMR-775 was redesignated Marine Medium Helicopter Squadron 775 (HMM-775) on 1 April 1962, and assigned to Marine Aircraft Group 46, 4th Marine Aircraft Wing. HMM-775 was deactivated 30 September 1962.

In March 1988, the first personnel and aircraft of what would eventually become Marine Aircraft Group 46 Detachment E, Marine Attack Helicopter Squadron 775 began arriving at Marine Corps Base Camp Pendleton in California.

On 7 January 1989, the unit was commissioned as MAG-46 Det E, HMA-775, MALS-46 Det E became a complement of eight 1968 model AH-1J's. This was the standup of the first Reserve Cobra Squadron on the west coast. The squadron became complete with 12 vintage AH-IJ SeaCobra helicopters.

On 1 December 1990, HMA-775 and its 12 AH-1J Cobras, was activated for deployment to Southwest Asia. The unit deployed to Southwest Asia on 5 January 1991, to Jubail, Saudi Arabia, in support of Operation Desert Shield and Desert Storm. The "Coyotes" participated in every major battle from Khafji to the final assault on Kuwait City, flying over 970 combat hours and accumulating 641 combat sorties. The squadron then remained in-country, in support of Operation Desert Comfort. By 15 May 1991, the final personnel and aircraft arrived back at MCB Camp Pendleton.

In May 1992 the squadron received the first eight of what would eventually total 12 AH-1W Super Cobras. A flash flood struck the Marine Corps Air Station Camp Pendleton in January 1993. The aircraft and building spaces suffered severe damage. The first aircraft flew again on 25 February. By mid-April, the squadron had moved into new temporary spaces and all aircraft were flying. During the July change of command, the "Coyotes" were awarded the Ensign Pierce Award for being the Marine Air Reserve Helicopter Squadron of the year in 1992.

HMLA-775 was attached to its active counterpart Mag-46 Det A (Detachment Alpha) who flew, maintained and operated the squadron on a daily basis. This small active component was responsible for the training and support of HMLA-775 during their drill weekends, active periods and unit activations for wartime deployment.

On 10 May 1994, the Squadron moved into a new hangar - their first permanent home at Camp Pendleton. On 18 June, six UH-1N Huey utility helicopters were added to inventory and on 6 August, the squadron was officially redesignated Marine Light Attack Helicopter Squadron 775 (HMLA-775), thus becoming the first HMLA in the 4th Marine Aircraft Wing.

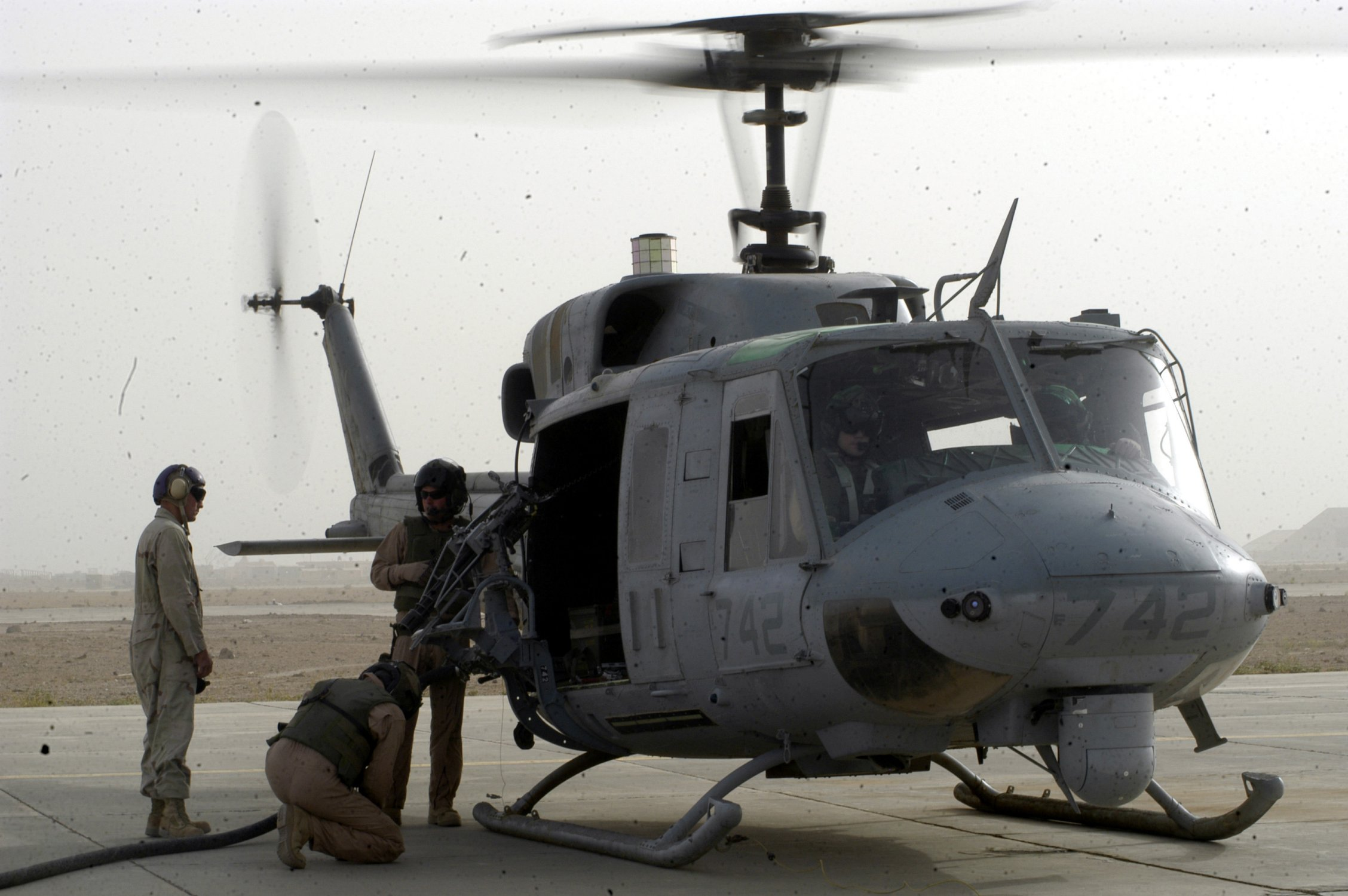
A UH-1N Huey from HMLA-775 at Al Taqaddum on April 30, 2004.

The Squadron functioned in the same manner as that of its active duty counterparts minus deploying overseas on the Marine Expeditionary Unit or regularly rotated stations. To enhance the squadron's readiness and demonstrate its versatility, HMLA-775 also participated in anti-drug and Border Patrol operations in support of Federal Agencies in locations such as Key West, Florida; Puerto Rico; the Bahamas; California; Klamath, Oregon; Idaho; Arizona; New Mexico; Texas; Nevada; and Jamaica.

=== Global War on Terror ===
HMLA-775 deployed with its sister squadron HMLA-775 Det A ( out of Johnstown, Pa), in support of Operation Iraqi Freedom two times. The first time was early 2004 when they flew in support of the I Marine Expeditionary Force. The bulk of their flying during this time was providing close air support in and around the city of Fallujah during Operation Vigilant Resolve and follow-on operations. HMLA-775 redeployed to Iraq in early 2005 to provide close air support for the II Marine Expeditionary Force.

=== Decommissioning ===
On 6 September 2008, HMLA-775 was decommissioned after 20 years of service.

=== Reactivation ===
On 1 October 2016, HMLA-775 was reactivated and currently resides at MCAS Camp Pendleton.

The first Bell AH-1Z Viper arrived on 18 November 2019.

== See also ==
- United States Marine Corps Aviation
- List of inactive United States Marine Corps aircraft squadrons
