= VMGR-234 =

Marine Aerial Refueler Transport Squadron 234
- VMGR-234 Insignia
- Active: 1 May 1942 – 20 March 1946; 1 June 1947 – present
- Country: United States
- Allegiance: United States of America
- Branch: United States Marine Corps
- Type: Cargo Transport / Aerial refueling Aircraft Lockheed Martin KC-130J
- Role: Assault support
- Part of: Marine Aircraft Group 41; 4th Marine Aircraft Wing
- Garrison/HQ: Naval Air Station Joint Reserve Base Fort Worth
- Nicknames: "Rangers" "Bears" (Vietnam Era)
- Tail Code: QH
- Engagements: World War II; Operation Desert Storm; Operation Enduring Freedom; Operation Iraqi Freedom

Commanders
- Current commander: Lieutenant Colonel Christian Mallamo

Marine Aerial Refueler Transport Squadron 234 (VMGR-234) is a reserve United States Marine Corps KC-130J squadron. They are a part of Marine Aircraft Group 41 (MAG-41), 4th Marine Aircraft Wing (4th MAW) and provide both fixed-wing and rotary-wing aerial refueling capabilities to support Marine Forces Reserve air operations in addition to assault air transport of personnel, equipment, and supplies. The squadron, known as the "Rangers" is stationed at Naval Air Station Joint Reserve Base Fort Worth, Texas.

== History ==
=== World War II ===
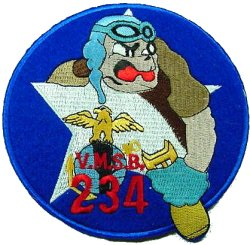
Squadron logo during WWII when they were VMSB-234

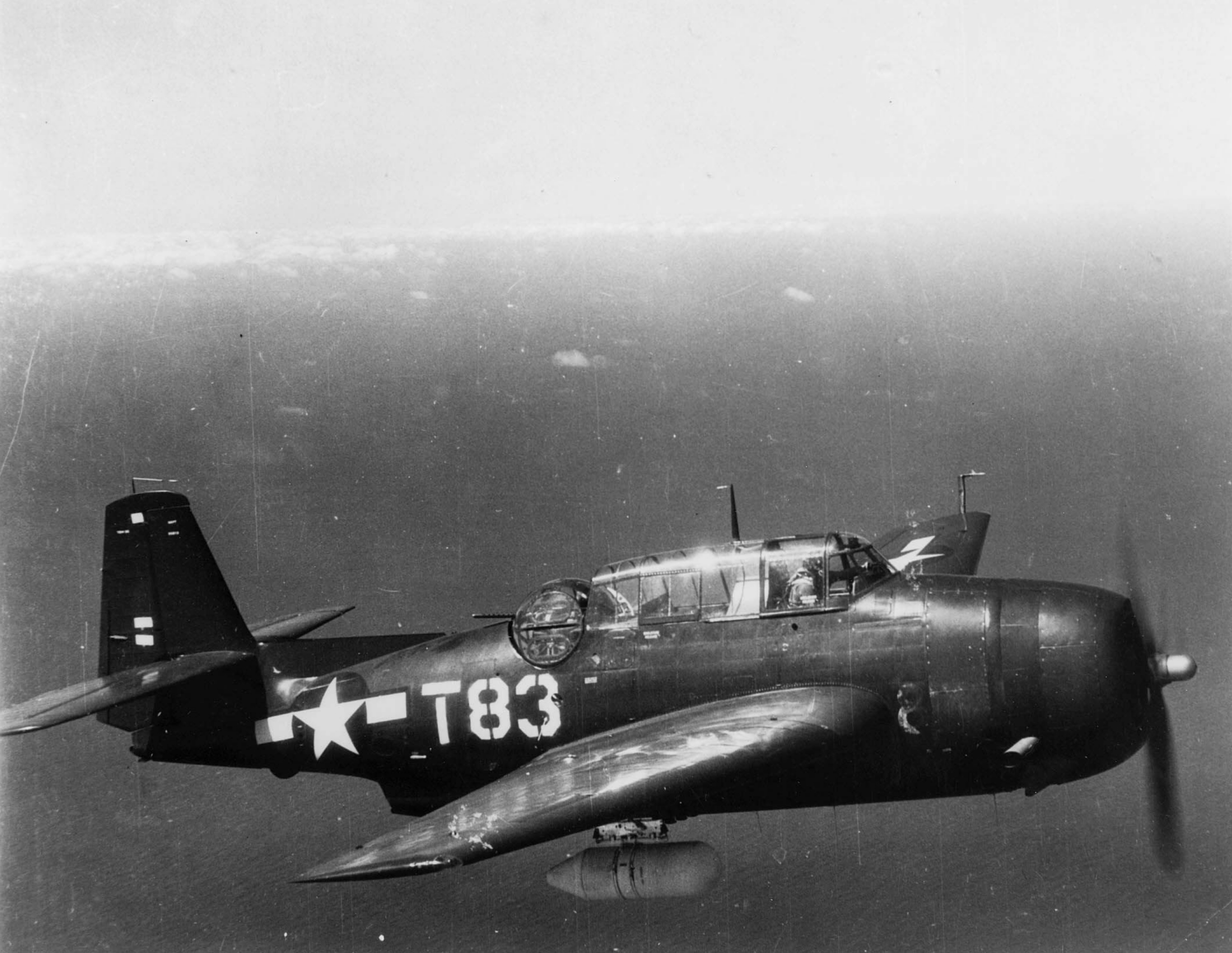
A VMTB-234 TBM-3E from the USS Vella Gulf (CVE-111), in 1945.

Marine Scout Bomber Squadron 234 (VMSB-234) was activated at Marine Corps Air Station Ewa on 1 May 1942. The squadron departed for Espiritu Santo in December 1942 and began their first combat tour as part of the Cactus Air Force on Guadalcanal on 28 January 1943. Their second stint on Guadalcanal began on 15 April 1943. During this time they did patrol duties in the Fiji Islands and also provided close air support in New Georgia. They moved to Munda and began operating from there in October 1943 concentrating their attacks in the vicinity of Bougainville. In November 1943 the squadron had moved to Efate and from there they returned to the United States.

They relocated to Marine Corps Air Station Miramar, California in November 1943 and were redesignated Marine Torpedo Bombing Squadron 234 (VMTB-234) on 14 October 1944. Their name was again changed this time to VMTB(CVS)-234 after which they deployed as part of Marine Carrier Group 3 on board the USS Vella Gulf (CVE-111). They were paired with VMF-513 during their deployment but never saw combat as the war ended. The squadron returned to California in November 1945 and was deactivated at Marine Corps Air Station El Toro on 20 March 1946.

=== Late 1940s through the 1960s ===
In January 1946, VMTB-234 was reassigned to Marine Aircraft Group 46 of the 4th Marine Aircraft Wing at MCAS El Toro, California. The squadron was deactivated on 20 March 1946. On 1 July 1947, the unit was reactivated as VMF-234, at Naval Air Station San Diego, California, and later moved to NAS Twin Cities in Minneapolis. During the Korean War, many of squadron's personnel were recalled to active duty and assigned to other squadrons, leaving VMF-234 as a paper squadron in Minneapolis.

The 1950s were a decade of constant change for the squadron, as it was transformed into an attack squadron (VMA-234) with the transition to the F9F Panther in February 1955; then the Douglas AD-5 Skyraider in May 1958; and the Fairchild C-119F Flying Boxcar in December 1961. After trading the Skyraider for Flying Boxcars, the unit was re-designated as Marine Transport Squadron 234 (VMR-234) on 1 January 1962.

=== 1970s through the 1980s ===
In 1970, the unit moved to NAS Glenview, Illinois. Five years later, they traded the C-119F Packets for the KC-130F Hercules. The "Thundering Herd" received its current squadron designation, Marine Aerial Refueler Transport Squadron 234 (VMGR-234), on 23 October 1983.

In December 1986, VMGR-234 became the first Marine squadron to land an aircraft on an ice runway, transporting supplies to McMurdo Station, Antarctica. In April 1988, a submarine, the USS Bonefish required assistance off the Florida coast. With the new nickname "Bears," from the local Chicago major league football team, VMGR-234 flew flotation equipment to NAS Norfolk, Virginia and NAS Newport, Florida, getting off the ground in less than an hour.

=== 1990s ===
In January 1991, the squadron was activated in support of the Gulf War, but remained at Naval Air Station Glenview. Aircraft from VMGR-234 deployed to the Persian Gulf for Operation Desert Storm, and the squadron remained on active duty until May 1991. In August 1994, the squadron was reassigned to Marine Aircraft Group 41 at Naval Air Station Joint Reserve Base Fort Worth, Texas. On 22 October 1995, the unit surpassed 73,000 accident free flight hours.

During a ceremony in 1997 the BEARS callsign and patch was retired. The RANGER(s) callsign and patch was adopted.

In 2000, VMGR-234 flew a variety support missions on six different continents for both active and reserve components. The Rangers were deployed for a total of 717 days. In one calendar year alone the squadron flew a total of 1,691 sorties.

=== Global War on Terror ===
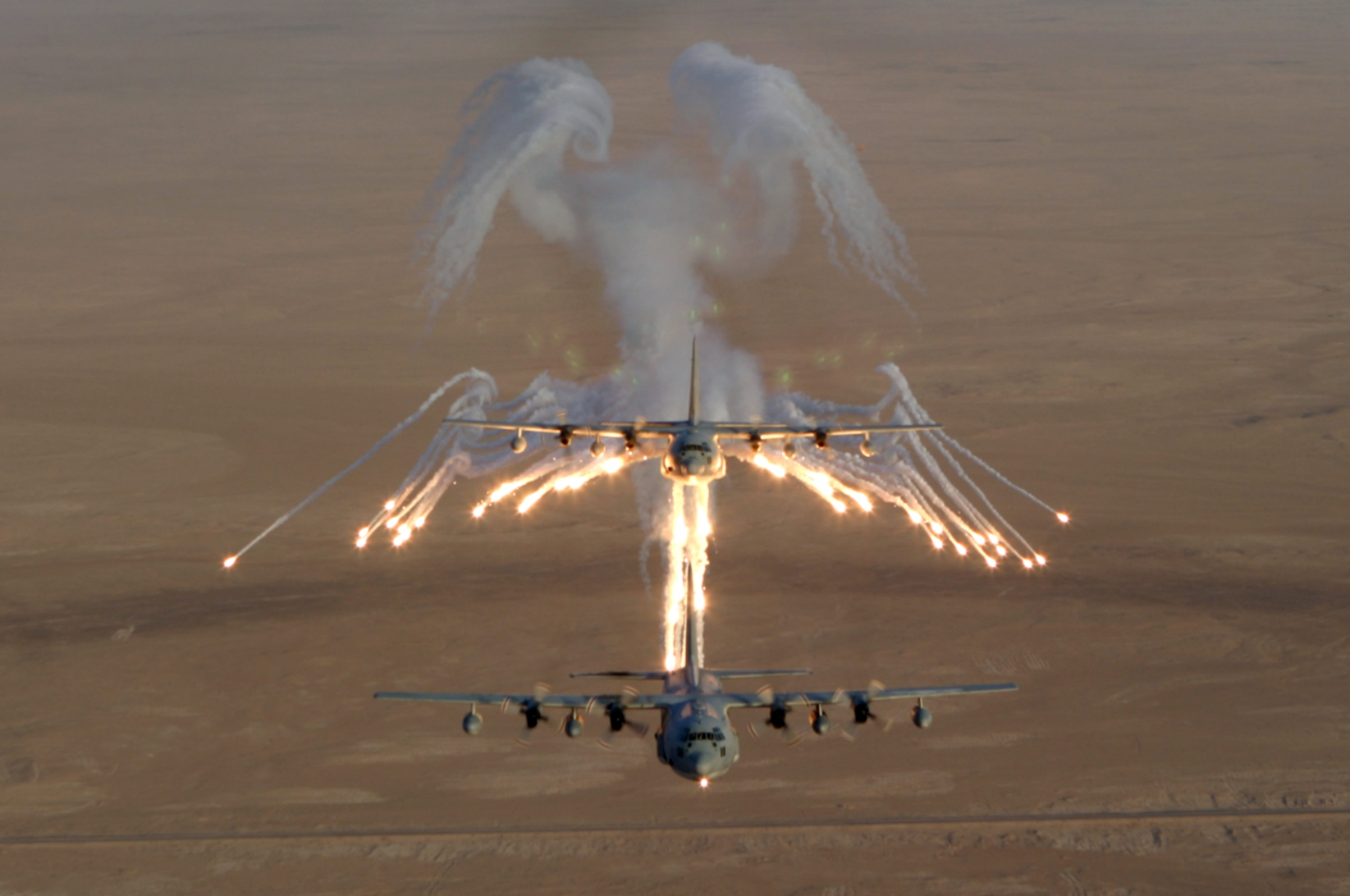
VMGR-234 KC-130s dropping flares over Iraq, 2003.

In 2003, VMGR-234 deployed to Bahrain and Kuwait to support Operation Iraqi Freedom. During the initial weeks of the invasion, the Rangers averaged roughly 25 combat sorties and 60 hours of flight time per day. The Rangers began their retrograde back to NAS-JRB Fort Worth, Texas, in September of that year. The squadron flew a total of 3,435 combat flight hours and 2,059 combat sorties in 2003.

In 2004 the squadron was deployed to Al Asad, Iraq as part of a co-operative cycle of Marine VMGR squadrons constantly in support of the war in Iraq. 234 was deployed from March to October 2004 with VMGR-352 and VMGR-452.

=== Current Operations ===
In 2005, VMGR-234 flew critical supplies to the gulf coast as part of Joint Task Force Katrina which provided support in the wake of Hurricane Katrina. From 2007 to 2011, the Rangers participated in numerous exercises in Morocco, Thailand, Romania, Norway, and the Philippines while supporting JIATF-S, 160th SOAR, 4th MAW and numerous other agencies. From 2011 to present, VMGR-234 has deployed in support of Operation Unified Protectorate, SPMAGTF-AF, SPMAGTF-BSRF, SPMAGTF-CR and ISO RFF-1200.

In 2021, VMGR-234 deployed aircraft to Camp Lemonnier in Djibouti, Africa as part of the North African Response Force and Combined Joint Task Force – Horn of Africa. VMGR-234 personnel conducted 11 airlifts, evacuating 838 personnel and 102 tons of cargo from Afghanistan during the 2021 Kabul airlift.

== See also ==
- United States Marine Corps Aviation
- List of active United States Marine Corps aircraft squadrons
- List of inactive United States Marine Corps aircraft squadrons
