= VMM-764 =

Marine Medium Tiltrotor Squadron 764
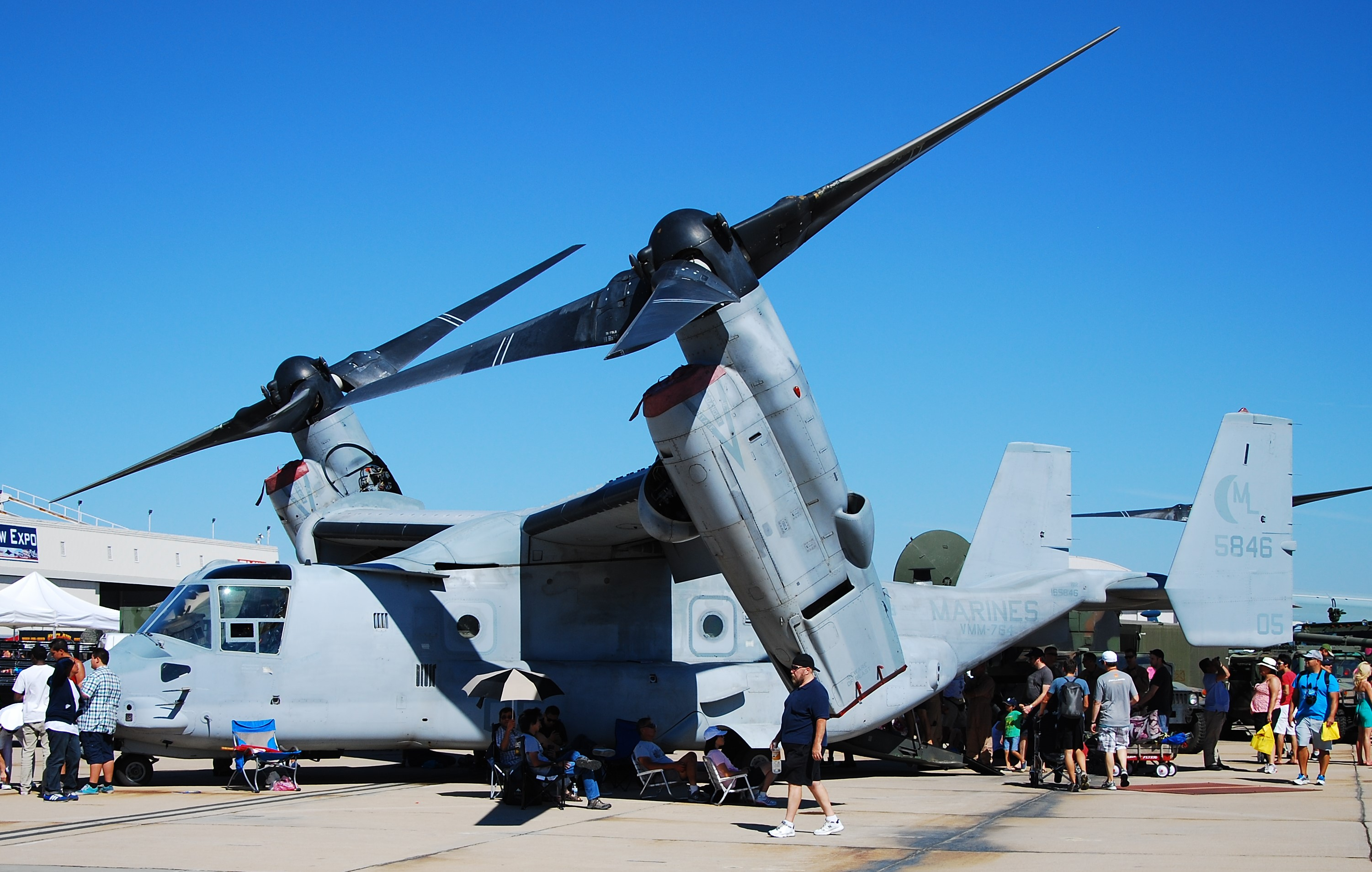
- VMM-764 MV-22B
- Active: 15 April 1958
- Country: United States
- Branch: USMCR
- Type: Medium Lift Tiltrotor Squadron
- Role: Support the MAGTF Commander by providing assault support transport of combat troops, supplies and equipment, day or night, under all weather conditions during expeditionary, joint, or combined operations.
- Part of: Marine Aircraft Group 41; 4th Marine Aircraft Wing
- Garrison/HQ: Marine Corps Air Station Miramar
- Nickname(s): Moonlight
- Motto(s): "Putting grunts in their place since 1958"
- Tail Code: ML
- Engagements: Operation Iraqi Freedom

Marine Medium Tiltrotor Squadron 764 (VMM-764) is a United States Marine Corps Reserve squadron consisting of MV-22B Ospreys. The squadron, known as "Moonlight," is based at Marine Corps Air Station Miramar in San Diego, CA and falls under the command of Marine Aircraft Group 41 (MAG-41) and the 4th Marine Aircraft Wing (4th MAW).

== History ==
- Activated 15 April 1958 as Marine Helicopter Transport Squadron 764, Organized Marine Corps Reserve (Aviation), Naval Air Station, Los Alamitos, California
- Redesignated 1 April 1962 as Marine Medium Helicopter Squadron 764, Organized Marine Corps Reserve (Aviation), Marine Air Reserve Training Detachment, Marine Air Reserve Training Command, Naval Air Station, Los Alamitos, California
- Reassigned during November 1965 to Marine Aircraft Group 46, 4th Marine Aircraft Wing, USMCR, Marine Air Reserve Training Detachment, Marine Air Reserve Training Command
- Relocated during May 1971 to Marine Corps Air Station El Toro, California.
- Relocated during June 1975 to Marine Corps Air Station (Helicopter) Tustin, California.
- Redesignated 1 October 1979 as Marine Medium Helicopter Squadron 764, Marine Aircraft Group 46, 4th Marine Aircraft Wing.
- Activated to support the active duty forces during the Persian Gulf War from November 1990 to April 1991.
- Relocated during 1999 to Edwards Air Force Base, California.
- Deployed from February - September 2004 and March - October 2005 to Al Asad, Iraq in support of Operation Iraqi Freedom
- From 25 April - 25 June 2008, the squadron was part of Special Purpose Marine Air Ground Task Force 24 (SPMAGTF 24) on board the USS Boxer (LHD-4). During this deployment the squadron brought essential air-lift capability to operations in Guatemala, El Salvador and Peru which allowed the various medical and engineering work site professionals the ability to get ashore. They flew 43 missions, 83 flight hours and transported 877 passengers. The mission is part of the Partnership of the Americas (POA) 2008. POA is a United States Southern Command sponsored annual maritime engagement operation to enhance multinational cooperation and strengthen partnership among navies and allied nations throughout the Americas. On 13 January 2013, HMM-764 became the first Marine Corps Reserve squadron to transition to the MV-22B Osprey. The squadron officially redesignated to Marine Medium Tiltrotor Squadron 764 (VMM-764) and relocated to Marine Corps Air Station Miramar in San Diego, CA.
- In November 2015, the squadron participated in the UNITAS amphibious exercise in Rio de Janeiro. This resulted in an MV-22 movement of 6,165 miles. The longest MV-22 flight in Marine Corps history to date.
- Deployed to Moron, Spain in support of Special Purpose Marine Air Ground Task Force Crisis Response Africa 17.1 (SPMAGTF-CR-AF 17.1) from January 2017 through July 2017.
- Supported Humanitarian efforts for exercise Kodiak Arctic Care 2021. Delivering medical personnel and medical items to remote villages on Kodiak Island, Alaska.

== See also ==
- List of active United States Marine Corps aircraft squadrons
- United States Marine Corps Aviation
