= Marine Corps Air Station El Toro =

Former airport in Orange County, California (1942–1999)

MCAS El Toro
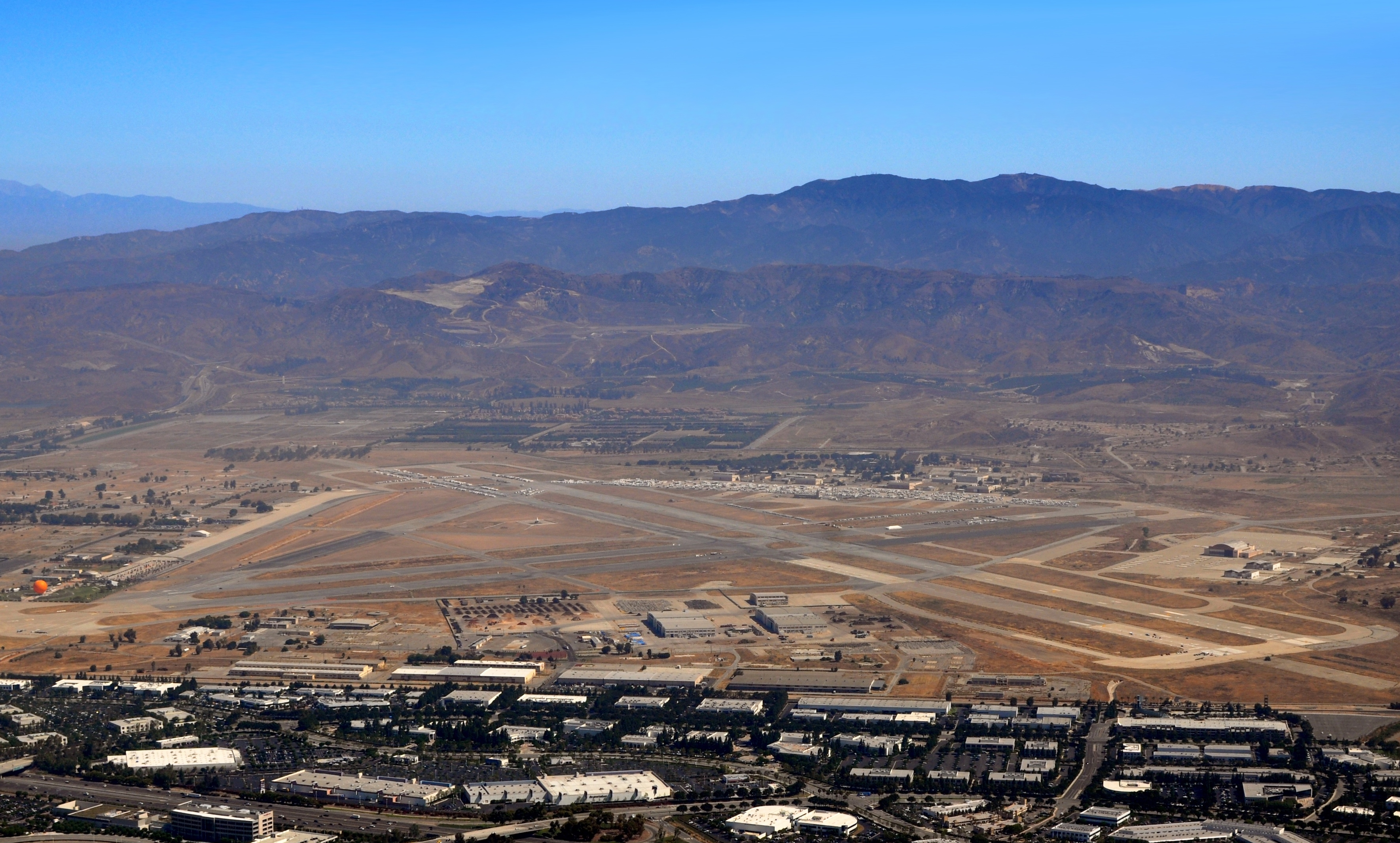
- Aerial view from southwest in 2010, eleven years after its closure.
- IATA: none; ICAO: KNZJ; FAA LID: NZJ

Summary
- Airport type: Defunct
- Operator: United States Marine Corps
- Location: Orange County, California
- Opened: November 4, 1942
- Closed: July 2, 1999
- Occupants: 3rd Marine Aircraft Wing
- Elevation AMSL: 383 ft (117 m)
- Coordinates: 33°40′34″N 117°43′52″W

Maps
- Location in the Los Angeles metropolitan area Location in California Location in the United States

Runways
Direction	Length		Surface
Direction	ft	m	Surface
03/21	3,900	1,189	Asphalt
07L/25R	8,000	2,438	Asphalt
07R/25L	8,000	2,438	Asphalt
16L/34R	10,000	3,048	Concrete
16R/34L	10,000	3,048	Concrete
- Source: Federal Aviation Administration

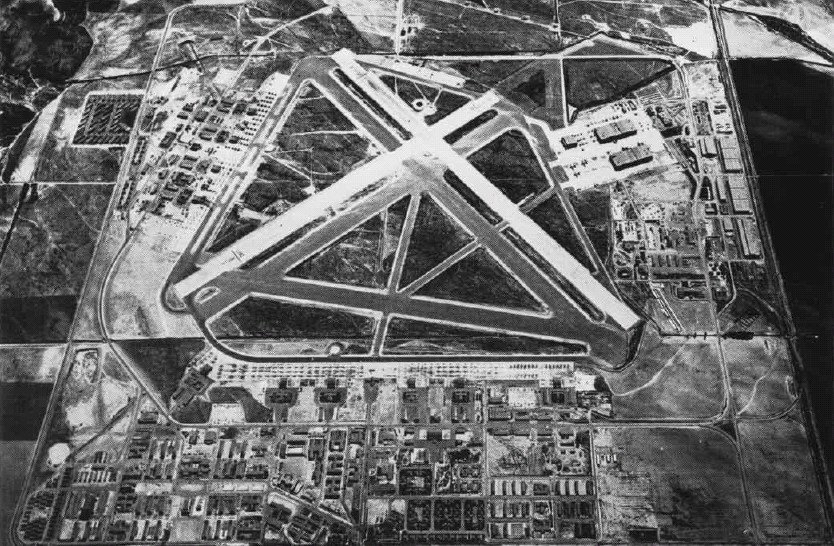
Aerial view from northwest in 1947

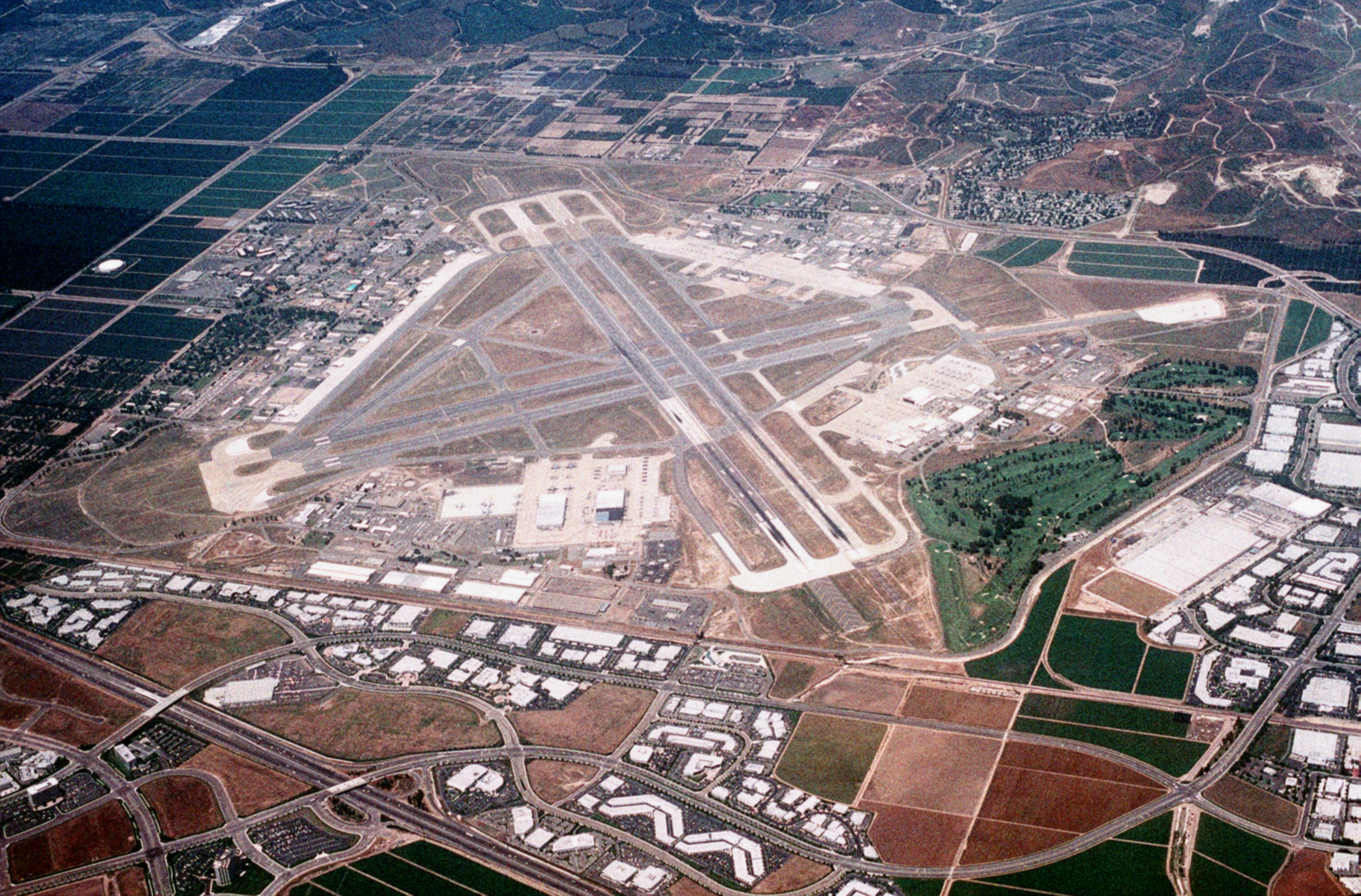
Aerial view from south in 1993

Marine Corps Air Station El Toro (ICAO: KNZJ, FAA LID: NZJ) was a United States Marine Corps Air Station located next to the community of El Toro and was then adjacent to the city of Irvine.

Before it was decommissioned in 1999, it was the 4,682-acre (19 km^{2}) home of Marine Corps Aviation on the West Coast. Designated as a Master Jet Base, its four runways (two of 8,000 feet (2,400 m) and two of 10,000 feet (3,000 m)) could handle the largest aircraft in the U.S. military inventory. While it was active, all U.S. presidents in the post-World War II era landed in Air Force One at this airfield. The El Toro "Flying Bull" patch was designed by Walt Disney Studios in 1944. It survived virtually unchanged until the close of the Air Station.

Following its decommissioning the site was used as a filming location, including the test track for the United States version of the BBC's Top Gear franchise. About 1,300 acres (530 ha) of land originally taken by the air station was converted into a large recreational center, the Orange County Great Park, while the rest was re-zoned for residential and commercial development.

== History ==
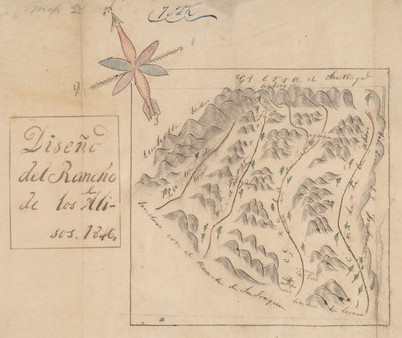
Air Station El Toro stood on land originally part of Rancho Cañada de los Alisos, granted in 1842 to José Antonio Serrano.

In May 1942, Lieutenant Colonel William Fox was directed to select the sites for all of the Marine Corps' West Coast air stations. Fox sought the most expeditious and low cost option and thus chose the already existing airports of El Centro, Mojave and Santa Barbara. For the fourth station, he chose land that had previously been looked at by the U.S. Navy for a blimp base. The Marine Corps gave the owner of the land, a farmer named James Irvine Sr., $100,000 for 4,000 acres (20 km^{2}) including 1,600 acres (6.5 km^{2}) designated for a blimp base. Construction of MCAS El Toro began on 3 August 1942 on land previously owned by the Irvine Company. The company greatly resisted the station's construction at this site, which at the time contained the largest lima bean field in North America, which was the company's prime source of revenue. The name "El Toro" came from the nearby small community of El Toro, now incorporated as Lake Forest, which in 1940 only had a population of 130 people.

The base headquarters was established on 4 November 1942, and the first landing occurred in late November when Major Michael Carmichael, flying from Camp Kearny, was forced to make an emergency landing among the construction equipment. The runways and taxiways were completed by 1 December 1942, and all squadron hangars were complete by 15 January 1943. Barracks and officer's quarters were ready by 20 January. January 1943 also saw the first operational units arriving at MCAS El Toro. First aboard were Marine Aircraft Group 41 and VMF-113. They were followed later in the month by VMSB-142, VMF-224, VMSB-231 and VMSB-232, who were returning from fighting during the Battle of Guadalcanal in order to re-organize, re-equip and train. The station was formally commissioned on 17 March 1943, with Colonel Theodore B. Millard as the first commanding officer. Soon after its opening, MCAS El Toro was handling the largest tactical aerodrome traffic on the Pacific Coast.

Already the largest Marine Corps air station on the West Coast, in 1944, funds were approved to double its size and operations including the activation of Marine Air Group-46. By the end of 1944, the base was home to 1,248 officers and 6,831 enlisted personnel.

In 1950, El Toro was selected as a permanent Master Jet Base for the Fleet Marine Force, Pacific. To support this new role, the aviation infrastructure at El Toro was expanded significantly. For most of the ensuing years, El Toro served as the primary base for Marine Corps west coast fighter squadrons. During the 1960s, many US Marines left for and returned from the Vietnam War at El Toro MCAS. In 1958, Marine Corps Air Station Miami was closed which brought the 3rd Marine Aircraft Wing to El Toro.

During the presidency of Richard Nixon, MCAS El Toro was used for flights to and from his "Western White House" at San Clemente, California. On 9 August 1974, after resigning the Presidency in the wake of the Watergate scandal, Richard and Pat Nixon flew from Andrews Air Force Base, Maryland to El Toro aboard VC-137C SAM 27000.

The land originally surrounding the base was mostly used for agricultural purposes when it first opened, but in the late 1980s and early 1990s, residential development began in the area; most of it was directly in the path of the base's runways, which proved to be a major problem as the constant loud noise produced by jets and helicopters passing overhead was very irritating to those living in the area. Few desired to move there because of this, causing the new neighborhoods to struggle.

In 1993, MCAS El Toro was designated for closing by the Base Realignment and Closure Commission and all of its activities were to be transferred to Marine Corps Air Station Miramar. The station officially closed on 2 July 1999.

May 1988 F/A-18 crash at MCAS El Toro
A non-fatal F/A-18 plane crash at an airshow held at MCAS El Toro in May 1988

Welcome video (1994)
Welcome video aimed at incoming marines assigned to MCAS El Toro in 1994

MCAS El Toro closure ceremony (July 1999) (1:09:46)
MCAS El Toro's closure ceremony in July 1999

== Environmental remediation ==
Before the site could be developed for civilian use, the Department of the Navy (which oversees the Marine Corps) was required to perform environmental remediation to clean up contaminated soil on the site. The contamination was caused by volatile organic compounds (VOCs), primarily industrial solvents that had been used over the years for purposes such as degreasing, paint stripping, and the cleaning of aircraft.

Over the years, the VOCs had seeped into the groundwater, resulting in a plume of contaminated groundwater extending for three miles (5 km) to the west of the station. In July 2005, the Department of the Navy's Base Realignment and Closure (BRAC) Program Management Office (PMO) issued a public notice stating that the cleanup of the contaminated soil was complete. The cleanup of the groundwater is being handled by the Irvine Desalter Project, a project of two local water authorities that has financial backing from the Navy and the State of California.

== Conversion proposals ==
The closing of MCAS El Toro ignited a political firestorm over the eventual fate of the facility. With the existing infrastructure, some favored converting the base into an international airport. Those favoring the new airport tended to come from northern Orange County (desiring the convenience of a closer airport), and from areas in Newport Beach that are within the arrival and departure noise zones surrounding John Wayne Airport (hoping to close that airport in favor of the new one at El Toro).

Those against the airport proposal were largely residents of the cities in the immediate vicinity of El Toro, such as Irvine, Lake Forest, Laguna Niguel, Laguna Woods, Dana Point, and Mission Viejo, where residents were alarmed at the idea of the aircraft noise. The cities opposed to the airport created a joint powers authority, the El Toro Reuse Planning Authority (ETRPA), to oppose the project. They were joined in the effort by grassroots organizations that collected record numbers of signatures on petitions to place anti-airport initiatives on the ballot and raised funds for the election campaigns. This faction lobbied strongly in favor of other uses for the property. The city of Irvine sought to annex the property for park and related uses.

In November 1994, voters passed Measure A, designating the property's land use to commercial aviation in the Orange County General Plan. A March 1996 ballot measure attempted to overturn Measure A, but failed. Since that time, the county released reports recommending conversion of El Toro into a commercial airport.

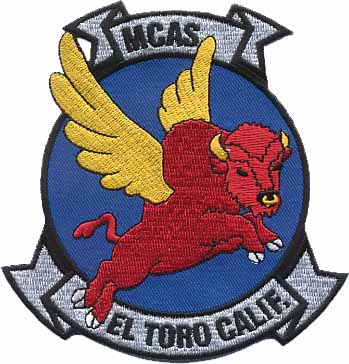
Air station insignia. An earlier cartoon version was designed by Walt Disney Studios.

The battle between pro-airport and anti-airport groups dominated Orange County politics for much of the late 1990s and early 2000s. From 1994 to 2001, $80 million in county and city funds was spent on campaigning for both sides. Airport proposals were defeated in two hotly contested ballot initiatives, and further challenges took place in the courts. A series of demonstration commercial flights from the airport in June 1999 generated less noise than the former military flights, but resulted in much public outcry due to the use of different flight paths from the military, and incessant circling over nearby cities to line up for another approach. Eventually the airport opponents prevailed, and in March 2002, the Department of Defense announced that it would sell the land to private interests to be developed into Orange County Great Park.

While many county residents were not persuaded of the need for a larger airport, regional transportation planners insisted that the county must share in handling a greater portion of the millions of passengers traveling by air in Southern California.

== Sale ==
The Department of the Navy hired the General Services Administration and Los Angeles-based Colliers International to assist in the sale of MCAS El Toro. Colliers branded the project as Heritage Fields combining the long-standing history of the base and what the future of the base will be to the community and the generations to come. An online auction was conducted and in February 2005, the final bid of $650 million was accepted for the four parcels of land comprising the former MCAS El Toro. The auction winner was Heritage Fields LLC, a joint venture between Lennar and several other firms. Development plans for the 3,724 acres (15 km^{2}) site include residential, golf, commercial, R&D, and schools. 1,375 acres (5.6 km^{2}) of the site will be dedicated to the Great Park. A ceremony to formally transfer ownership of the property to Heritage Fields LLC was held on 29 August 2005.

== Accidents and incidents ==
- On 19 November 1958, an F4D Skyray fighter jet overshot the runway and was struck by a southbound passenger train, the San Diegan. Train No. 74 hit the F4D at 75 miles (121 km)-per-hour. All three locomotive units and cars #3430, #3165, #3144, #1399, #3100, #3094, #3082 derailed after hitting the F4D. No fatalities and only a few injuries resulted.
- On 25 June 1965, a U.S. Air Force Boeing C-135A bound for Okinawa crashed just after takeoff at MCAS El Toro, killing all eighty-four on board.
- On 23 January 1967, two Douglas A-4 Skyhawk jets were wing-tipping on approach. Pilot Frank Gambelli had lost his radio in a rainstorm, and he was wing-tipping with Pilot James Powell over Leisure World on approach. Visibility was practically zero. The two jets collided and both pilots ejected. Pilot Powell ejected safely, but was thrown into the side of a building when his parachute caught on the top of the building and was slammed into it and died. Pilot Gambelli landed next to St. Nicholas Catholic Church just at the end of service. GSgt H.W. Oviatt raced out of the church and took pilot Gambelli back to the base. The wreckage of the jets crashed onto two buildings in Leisure World, killing four people on the ground.
- On 30 July 1970, a Lockheed Martin KC-130F of VMGR-352 crashed and burned during a maximum effort landing, killing 4 of 5 crewmen on board.
- On 6 June 1971, a midair collision occurred between Hughes Airwest Flight 706, a Douglas DC-9 jetliner, and a Marine Corps F-4B Phantom being flown to MCAS El Toro, claiming 50 lives. The DC-9, with 44 passengers and 5 crew members aboard, impacted into a remote canyon approximately three miles north of Duarte, California along with one of the crew members of the fighter whose wreckage was found in another canyon approximately .75 miles southeast of the DC-9's crash site. One of the Marines in the fighter survived the accident.
- On 4 July 1986, 21-year-old Marine Lance Corporal, Howard Foote Jr., an aviation mechanic at El Toro, took an A-4 Skyhawk on an unauthorized 90-minute joyride over southern California. Foote, an accomplished glider pilot, was despondent after learning that due to a medical condition, he would never be able to fly in the Marines. He landed the aircraft safely and was subsequently discharged under less than honorable conditions after serving 4 1/2 months in confinement.
- On 12 Feb 1987, a CH-46E helicopter from HMM-764, MAG-46 crashed, shortly after takeoff, into a steep, brush-covered ridge between Bell and Trabuco canyons. All three crewmembers on board, Major Dudley Urban, Major William Anderson, and Staff Sergeant Bradley Baird, died in the crash.
- On 24 April 1988, Marine Corps Colonel Jerry Cadick, then commanding officer of MAG-11, was performing a tactical aerial demonstration at the MCAS El Toro Air Show before a crowd of 300,000 when he crashed his F/A-18 Hornet at the bottom of a loop that was too close to the ground. The aircraft was in a nose-high attitude, but still carrying too much energy toward the ground when it impacted at more than 300 mph (480 km/h). Col. Cadick was subjected to extremely high G-forces that resulted in his face making contact with the control stick and sustaining serious injury. He broke his arm, elbow and ribs, exploded a vertebra and collapsed a lung. Col. Cadick survived and retired from the Marine Corps. The crashed F/A-18 remained largely intact but was beyond repair.
- On 22 January 1991, Marine Corps Colonel James Sabow apparently committed suicide amid allegations of base corruption, specifically using military aircraft for personal use. His family and friends denied he committed suicide and pointed out that Col. Sabow had pledged to fight the charges against him just minutes before his death in phone conversations with other officers. According to a 1996 lawsuit by his family, Sabow was murdered because he threatened to expose an authorized covert operation at El Toro involving some of his fellow officers, CIA-sponsored airlifts to Central and South America, running arms and drugs.
- On 2 May 1993, during the 1993 MCAS El Toro airshow, an F-86 Sabre crashed on the runway after failing to pull out of a vertical loop. The F-86 pilot, James A. Gregory, died on impact. No one was hurt on the ground. The airshow continued. Normally the F-86 performed with a MiG-15, but the pilot of the MiG-15 was ill that day and the F-86 was doing a solo run.

== Notable events ==
- The MCAS El Toro Air Show took place annually from the 1950s until 1997. It featured the U.S. Navy Blue Angels, as well as the USAF Thunderbirds. The Air Show also featured new aircraft that were coming into active service, such as the B-2 stealth bomber. Other displays featured military vehicles. The show also had a large gathering of vendors of military items and memorabilia. The final Air Show in 1997 drew an estimated two million visitors.
- MCAS El Toro was regularly used for flight operations by Special Air Missions during President Richard Nixon's term in office, in support of the "Western White House," Nixon's home at San Clemente. The final Nixon flights were, first, when he landed there upon resigning the White House in 1974, and again, after his death in 1994, when his body was flown to California for burial. He flew both times in his Air Force One, SAM 27000.
- In 2006, an abandoned F/A-18 hangar in Irvine was sealed to create, in effect, a giant pinhole camera, and a panoramic print of the El Toro Air Station was formed on a light-sensitive muslin cloth measuring 111 feet wide, 32 feet high. Under the direction of Laguna Beach photographer Jacques Garnier, the image, known as "The Great Picture," was originally produced as part of the Legacy Project - a photographic and historical record of the base before being transformed into what is now the Orange County Great Park. This is believed to be the largest photographic image ever taken by a camera.
- From 2005 to 2012, depending on the year, there were small air shows, fireworks, family New Year's Eve (the balloon dropped at 9 pm) and other events related to Growing the Park, at the Great Park, the new name for the site.

== Demographics ==
Historical population
Census	Pop.	Note	%±
1970	6,970		—
1980	7,632		9.5%
1990	6,869		−10.0%
U.S. Decennial Census; 1860–1870 1880-1890; 1900 1910 1920; 1930 1940 1950; 1960 1970 1980; 1990 2000 2010

The area was listed as an unincorporated community in the 1970 U.S. census under the name El Toro Station; and as a census designated place in the 1980 United States census. The CDP was deleted prior to the 2000 U.S. census after the airbase was closed and is now part of the city of Irvine.

== See also ==
- List of United States Marine Corps air stations
- Naval Air Station Los Alamitos Naval Outlying Landing Fields also used by Marine Corps Air Station El Toro in World War 2
