= 4th Marine Aircraft Wing =

Aviation combat element of the U.S. Marine Corps Forces Reserve

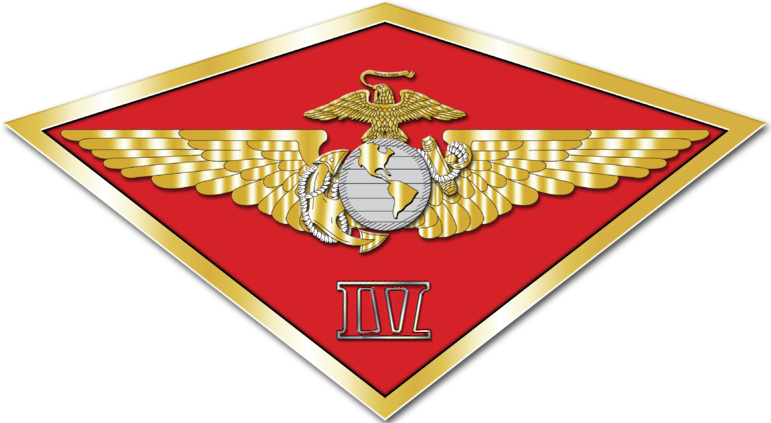
- 4th Marine Aircraft Wing Insignia
- Active: 22 August 1942 - 26 March 1946; 1 July 1962 - present
- Country: United States
- Branch: United States Marine Corps
- Type: Marine Aircraft Wing
- Role: Conduct air operations in support of the Fleet Marine Forces
- Part of: Marine Forces Reserve
- Garrison/HQ: New Orleans, Louisiana
- Engagements: World War II

Commanders
- Current commander: BrigGen Patrick F. Tiernan
- Notable commanders: Lawson H. M. Sanderson; Robert P. Keller; Hugh M. Elwood; Jack Bergman

Insignia
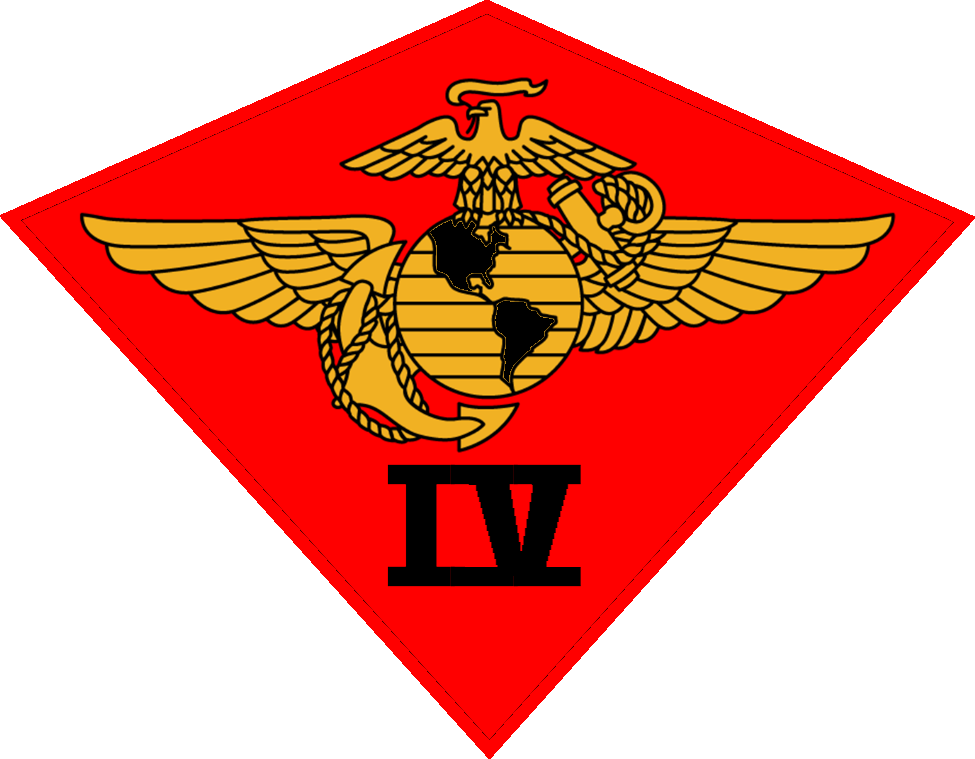
- WWII Era 4th MAW Insignia

The 4th Marine Aircraft Wing is the reserve airwing of the United States Marine Corps. It is headquartered in New Orleans, Louisiana but its subordinate units are scattered throughout the United States.

== Mission ==
Conduct air operations in support of the Fleet Marine Forces to include anti-air warfare, offensive air support, assault support, electronic warfare, aerial reconnaissance, control of aircraft and missiles, and as a collateral function, to participate as an integral component of Naval Aviation in the execution of such other Navy functions as directed.

== Organization ==
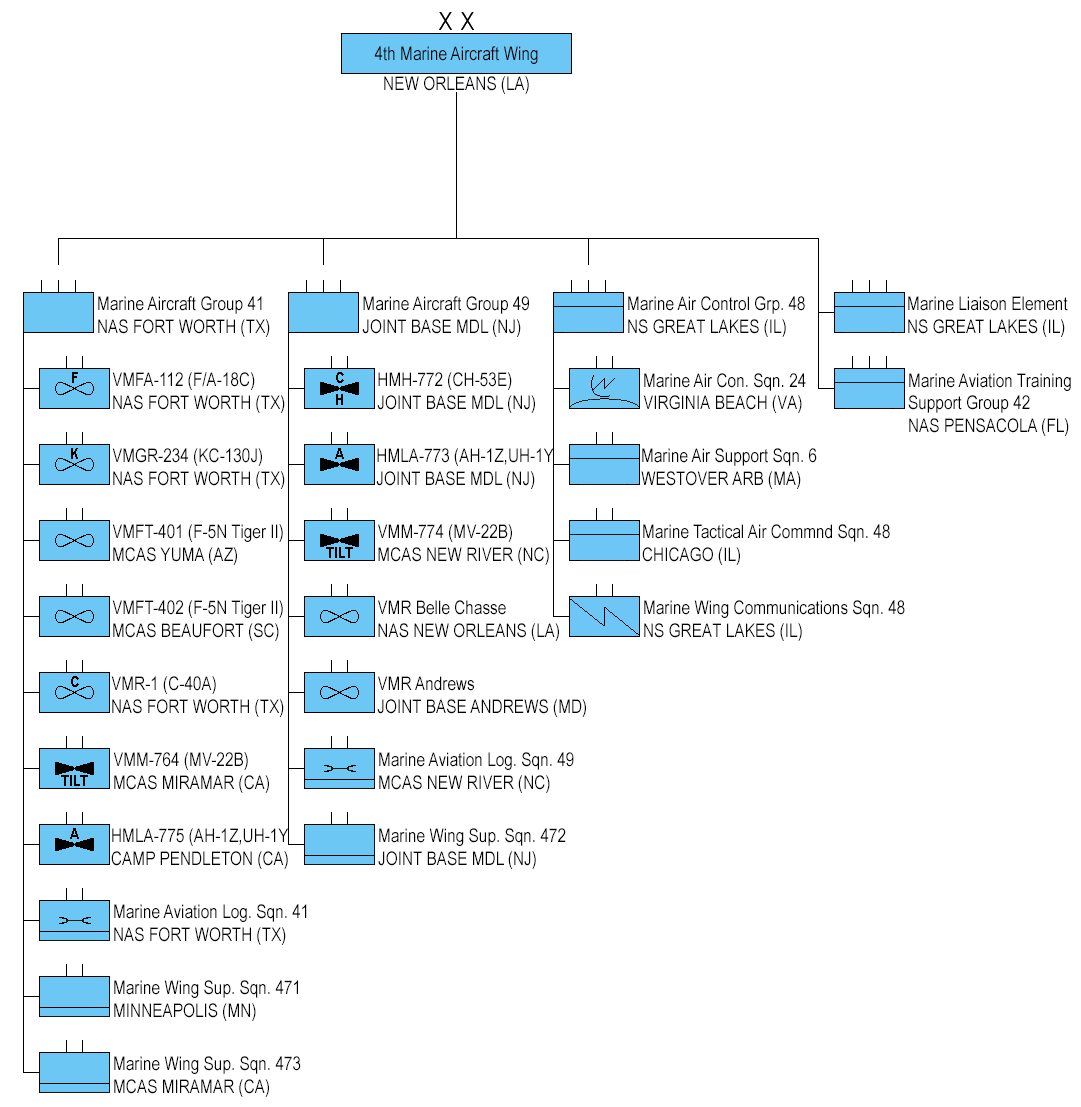
4th Marine Aircraft Wing organization as of May 2026 (click to enlarge)

As of May 2026, the 4th Marine Aircraft Wing consists of the following units:

- 4th Marine Aircraft Wing Headquarters (MAW HQ)
- Marine Aircraft Group 41, at Naval Air Station Joint Reserve Base Fort Worth (Texas)
- Marine Air Control Group 48, at Naval Station Great Lakes (Illinois)
- Marine Aircraft Group 49, at Joint Base McGuire–Dix–Lakehurst (New Jersey)
- Marine Aviation Training Support Group 42, at Naval Air Station Pensacola (Florida)
- Marine Liaison Element (MARLE), at Naval Station Great Lakes (Illinois)
- Site Support Miramar, at Marine Corps Air Station Miramar (California)

== History ==
Prior to World War II, Marine Reserve aviation consisted of a few personnel operating obsolete aircraft under severe budgetary limitations. With the threat of war in Europe, a few reservists were activated, and by October 1940, many had been called to active duty. This handful of dedicated men helped build the Marine aviation force which cleared the skies and supported ground operations during World War II.

=== World War II ===
The 4th Marine Base Defense Aircraft Wing was commissioned 22 August 1942, at Marine Corps Air Station Ewa (MCAS Ewa), Hawaii. The Wing's three squadrons were located at Midway, Ewa and Samoa with the headquarters at MCAS Ewa. On November 10, 1944, the 4th Marine Base Defense Aircraft Wing became the 4th Marine Aircraft Wing (4th MAW). In August 1944, 4th MAW squadrons flying from airfields in the Marshall Islands flew 3,217 sorties during 205 missions and dropped 1,197 tons of ordnance against Japanese bases in on bypassed islands in the Central Pacific. As the war progressed across the Pacific, 4th MAW pilots refined fighter bombing and low-altitude flying techniques that helped pave the way for today's MAGTF concept.

=== Post-WW II and Korea ===
4th MAW was deactivated shortly after the war. On 25 February 1946, the Marine Air Reserve Training Command (MARTC) was established to preserve the skill of those Marines returning to civilian life. Headquarters for MARTC was located at Naval Air Station Glenview, Illinois. Post World War II foresight paid off in 1950 when the Korean War broke out. Having grown to a force of 6,035 men who trained at 25 Marine Air Detachments from coast to coast, the Marine Air Reserve was prepared for mobilization.

Less than two weeks after mobilization day, 23 July 1950, three reserve fighter squadrons were on duty in Korea. Within the first seven weeks, the Marine Air Reserve furnished enough men to increase Marine fighter squadron strength in the Far East from two to six squadrons. Seven months later, more than 50 percent of the officers and 36 percent of the enlisted Marines in the 1st MAW were Reservists.

The lessons and experiences of Korea helped expand and improve the entire reserve aviation program. In September 1953, Marine Air Detachments were redesignated as Marine Air Reserve Training Detachments (MARTDS). Most MARTDS were located aboard Naval Air Stations across the nation.

=== 1960s - 1980s ===
The MARTC was reorganized in 1962 to include a Marine Aircraft Wing. This reorganization coincided with similar moves in the ground reserve, resulting in the division-wing concept for the entire Marine Corps reserve Program. The 4th MAW was brought back into being and the MARTC-4th MAW became a dual command.

As turmoil developed in the Dominican Republic and U.S. involvement in Southeast Asia increased during the mid-1960s, the necessity of having a ready force in reserve became more apparent. Emphasis was shifted to the 4th MAW and in July 1966, a reorganization was undertaken to ensure that all units were prepared to execute the same missions and tasks as assigned in the regular Fleet Marine Force.

In June 1974, 4th MAW/MARTC headquarters relocated to New Orleans. In October 1979, the MARTC was disbanded to organize the 4th MAW along the same lines as its active duty counterparts.

=== The Gulf War & the 1990s ===
During Operation Desert Shield and Operation Desert Storm, numerous units from 4th MAW were mobilized and deployed to the Persian Gulf region. Starting on 6 August 1990, KC-130s of VMGR-234 and VMGR-452 began supporting the staging of Marine units. As well, HMM-774, HMM-764, HML-767, and HMA-775 were called up to reinforce Marine Aircraft Group 26. These units provided air support and reinforcement to deployed Marine units, contributing to the victory of allied forces.

== Current aircraft in use ==
=== Fixed-wing aircraft ===
- F/A-18 Hornet
- F-5 Tiger II
- KC-130J Super Hurcules
- UC-35D Citation
- UC-12F/W Huron
- C-40A Clipper

=== Rotary wing aircraft ===
- AH-1Z Viper
- Bell UH-1Y Venom
- CH-53E Super Stallion
- MV-22 Osprey

== See also ==
- United States Marine Corps Aviation
- Organization of the United States Marine Corps
- List of United States Marine Corps aircraft groups
- List of United States Marine Corps aircraft squadrons
