= VMFA-312 =

United States Marine Corps aircraft unit

Marine Fighter Attack Squadron 312
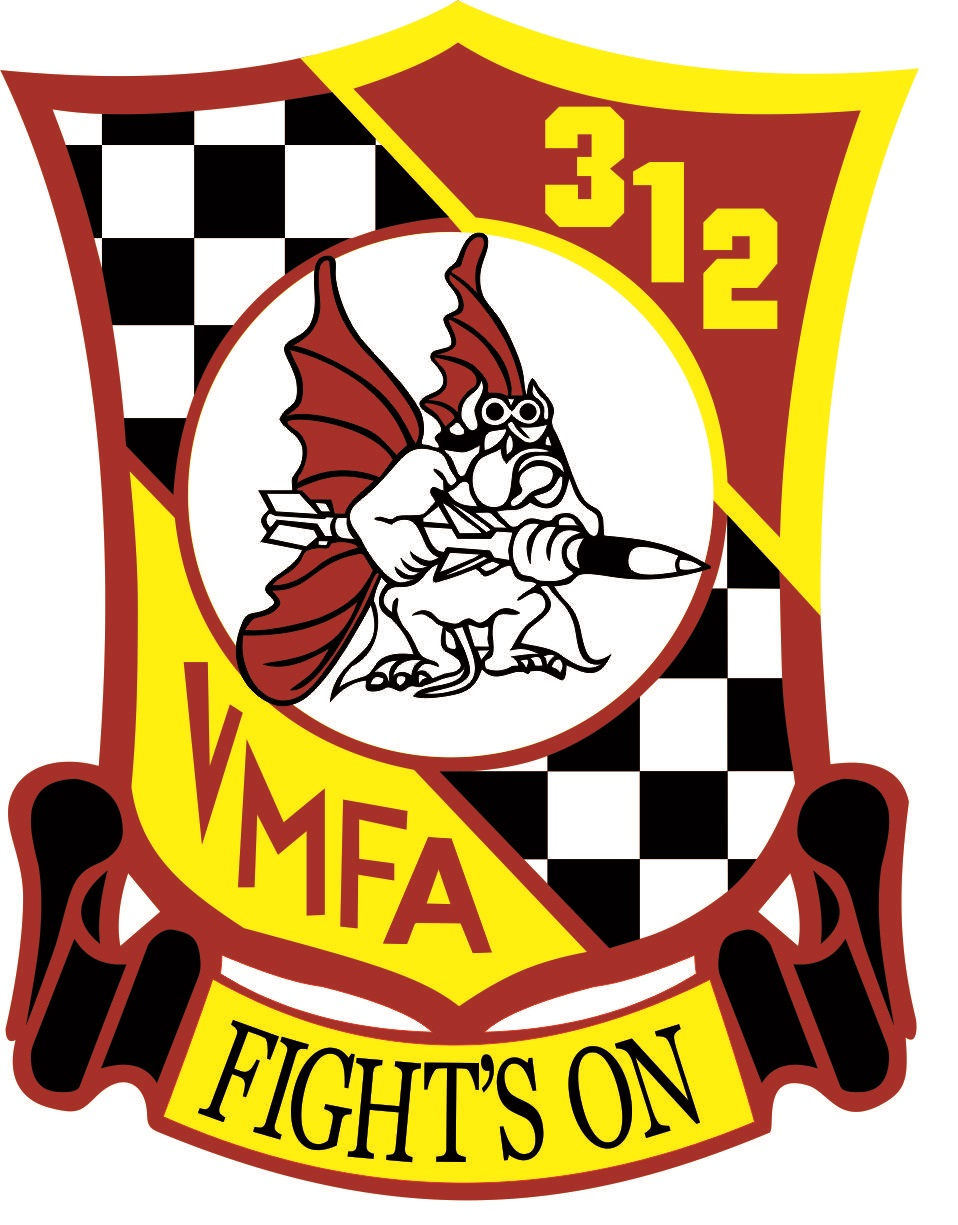
- VMFA-312 Official Squadron Logo
- Active: 1 June 1943 - present
- Country: United States of America
- Branch: United States Marine Corps
- Type: Fighter/Attack
- Role: Close air support Air interdiction Aerial reconnaissance
- Part of: Marine Aircraft Group 31; 2nd Marine Aircraft Wing
- Garrison/HQ: Marine Corps Air Station Beaufort
- Nicknames: Checkerboards; Day's Knights (World War II)
- Motto: "Fight's On!"
- Tail Code: DR / AC / NA
- Mascot: Bulldog
- Engagements: World War II; Battle of Okinawa; Korean War; Vietnam War; Operation Sharp Guard; Operation Deny Flight; Operation Deliberate Force; Operation Southern Watch; Operation Desert Fox; Operation Iraqi Freedom; Operation Enduring Freedom
- Website: https://www.2ndmaw.marines.mil/Units/MAG-31/VMFA-312/

Commanders
- Commanding Officer: LtCol. Adam T. Young
- Executive Officer: Maj. Robert M. Sawyer
- Notable commanders: Gen. James F. Amos

Aircraft flown
- Fighter: Goodyear FG-1 Corsair; Vought F4U Corsair; F7F-3 Tigercat; F9F Panther; FJ Fury; F-8 Crusader; F-4 Phantom II; F/A-18A/C/D Hornet

Marine Fighter Attack Squadron 312 (VMFA-312) is a United States Marine Corps F/A-18C Hornet squadron. Also known as the Checkerboards, the squadron is based at Marine Corps Air Station Beaufort, South Carolina and falls under the command of Marine Aircraft Group 31 (MAG-31) and the 2nd Marine Aircraft Wing (2nd MAW). The radio callsign is "Check / Carlos."

== History ==
=== World War II ===
Marine Fighter Squadron 312 (VMF-312) was commissioned on 1 June 1943, at Page Field, Parris Island, South Carolina. Originally it was part of Marine Aircraft Group 31, (MAG-31) 1st Marine Aircraft Wing. The first aircraft the squadron received were ten SNJ-4 Texans and one F4U-1A Corsair. As their unit crest the squadron members choose a satan-like bulldog wearing a flying helmet and carrying at that time six .50 caliber machineguns (the armament of the Corsair) drawn by Technical Sergeant James R. Wroble. In honor of their commanding officer, Major Richard M. Day, the men nicknamed their squadron "Day's Knights." Also at this time, the Checkerboards emblem began to appear on both the cowling and rudder of the aircraft.

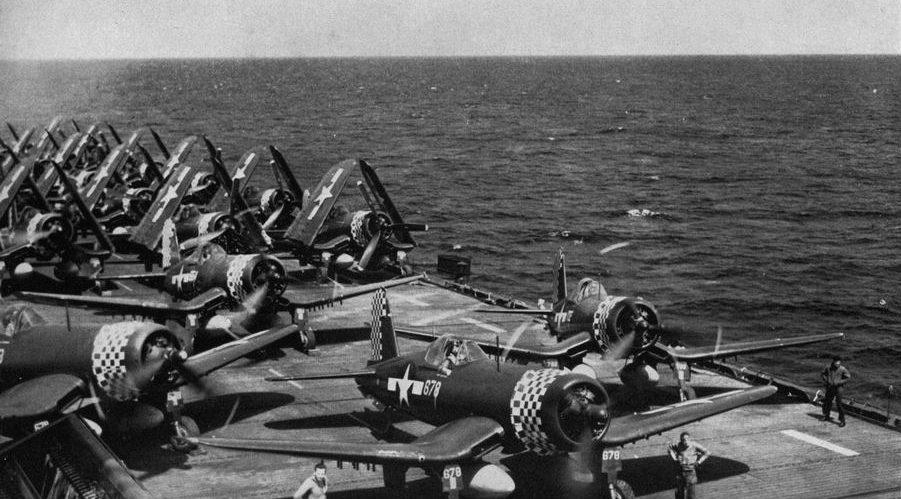
VMF-312 launches from USS Hollandia off Okinawa, in April 1945.

In August 1943 the squadron was transferred to Marine Aircraft Group 32, 3rd Marine Aircraft Wing at the newly constructed Marine Corps Air Station Cherry Point, North Carolina. On 16 December 1943 the squadron received orders to prepare to move to the west coast of the United States beginning the first week of January 1944. VMF-312 began movement to San Diego, California on 2 January 1944, eventually arriving at Miramar. The squadron departed MCAS Miramar on 28 February 1944 bound for Marine Corps Air Station Ewa, Hawaii. VMF-312 trained at MCAS Ewa for three months and then headed out for Espiritu Santo, New Hebrides to become part of Marine Aircraft Group 11 (MAG-11), 2nd Marine Aircraft Wing (2nd MAW).

Assigned to Marine Aircraft Group 11 on 25 June 1944, the squadron was transported to Espiritu Santo, New Hebrides, where they received 24 new F4U-1D Corsairs. VMF-312's first combat action came on 12 April 1945 during the Battle of Okinawa as part of Marine Aircraft Group 33 (MAG-33), when four squadron aircraft intercepted 20 Japanese Zeros and scored eight kills without a loss. VMF-312 continued to operate from Kadena Air Base on Okinawa until the cessation of hostilities. By war's end, the squadron had accounted for 59.5 air combat kills in the Pacific Theater.

Between September 1945 and February 1946 VMF-312 participated in the occupation force stationed on Okinawa, Japan.

=== 1946-1950 ===
Returning to the United States in February 1946, the squadron began operations at Marine Corps Air Station El Toro still as part of MAG-33, where the squadron completed a transition to F7F-3 Tigercats, a single seat day fighter variant of the two seat Tigercat night fighter. Although the night fighters continued in service for several years, the day fighter version proved unsuitable, and VMF-312 transitioned back to Corsairs, this time F4U-4s, a higher performance model.

=== The Korean War, 1950-1955 ===
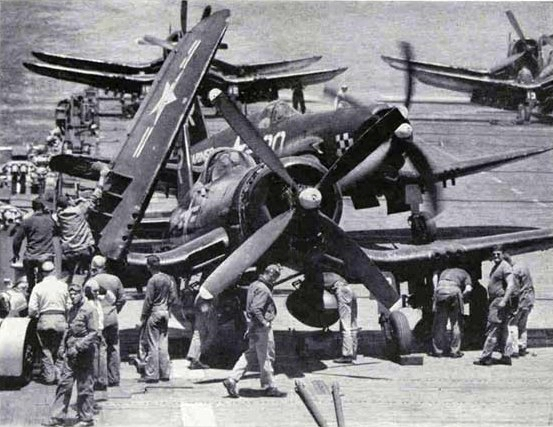
F4U-4s of VMF-312 on the USS Bataan in 1952.

The squadron transferred to Marine Aircraft Group 12, MCAS El Toro in July 1950 and was alerted for deployment and service in the Korean War. The first VMF-312 aircraft flew in Korea on 19 September 1950. Flying out of Wonson Air Base, the Checkerboards flew missions in support of the 1st Marine Division during the Battle of Chosin Reservoir. Redeployed in March 1951 aboard the light carrier USS Bataan (CVL-29), the Checkerboards were assigned escort and blockade missions. Leaving the ship in June 1951, the squadron amassed 4,945 accident-free hours of carrier operations while logging 1,920 carrier landings. After a short period of ground-based close air support operations, the squadron returned to sea, first with Bairoko, then with Bataan, and later with Sicily. On 1 March 1952, the squadron was redesignated as Marine Attack Squadron 312 (VMA-312).

While aboard Bataan, the Checkerboards became the first piston engine squadron to shoot down a jet aircraft, when Captain Jesse Folmar shot down a MiG-15 jet fighter with 20 mm cannon fire. On June 8, 1953, the Checkerboards were relieved by VMF-332, and returned to the United States in anticipation of transitioning to F9F Panthers at Marine Corps Air Station Miami, Florida. On January 5, 1954 the departed MCAS Miami and joined Marine Aircraft Group 32 (MAG-32) at MCAS Cherry Point. In November 1954, the squadron took possession of its new aircraft, the North American FJ-2 Fury. Another move came in November 1954 when the squadron arrived at the recently established MCAS Beaufort, SC. From October through December 1958, VMF-312 deployed to Guantanamo Bay Naval Base during the height of the Cuban Revolution. During this time the squadron flew more than 1300 flight hours and shot more than 110,000 round of ammunition.

=== The 1960s through the 1990s ===
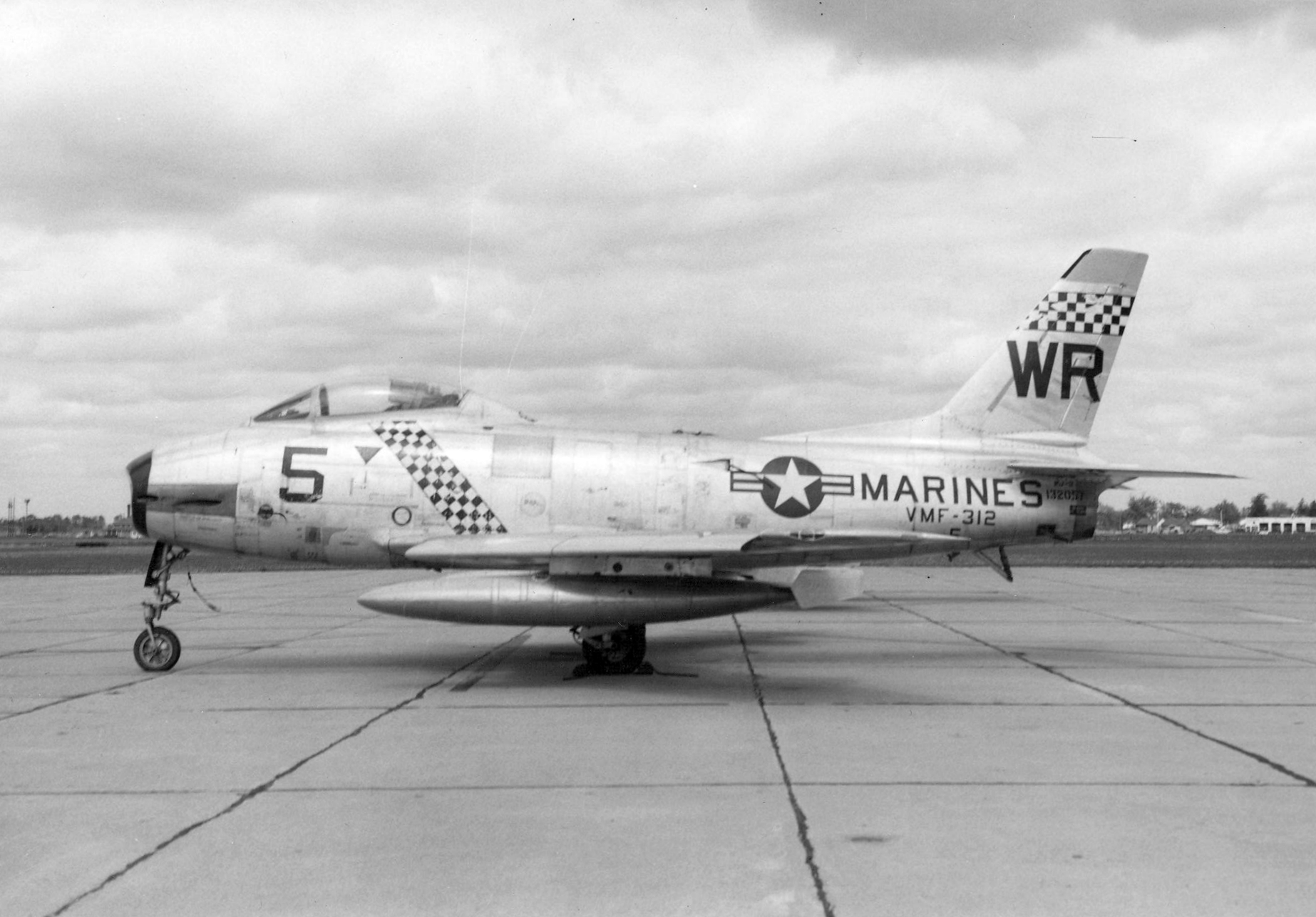
An FJ-2 of VMF-312, ca. in 1955.

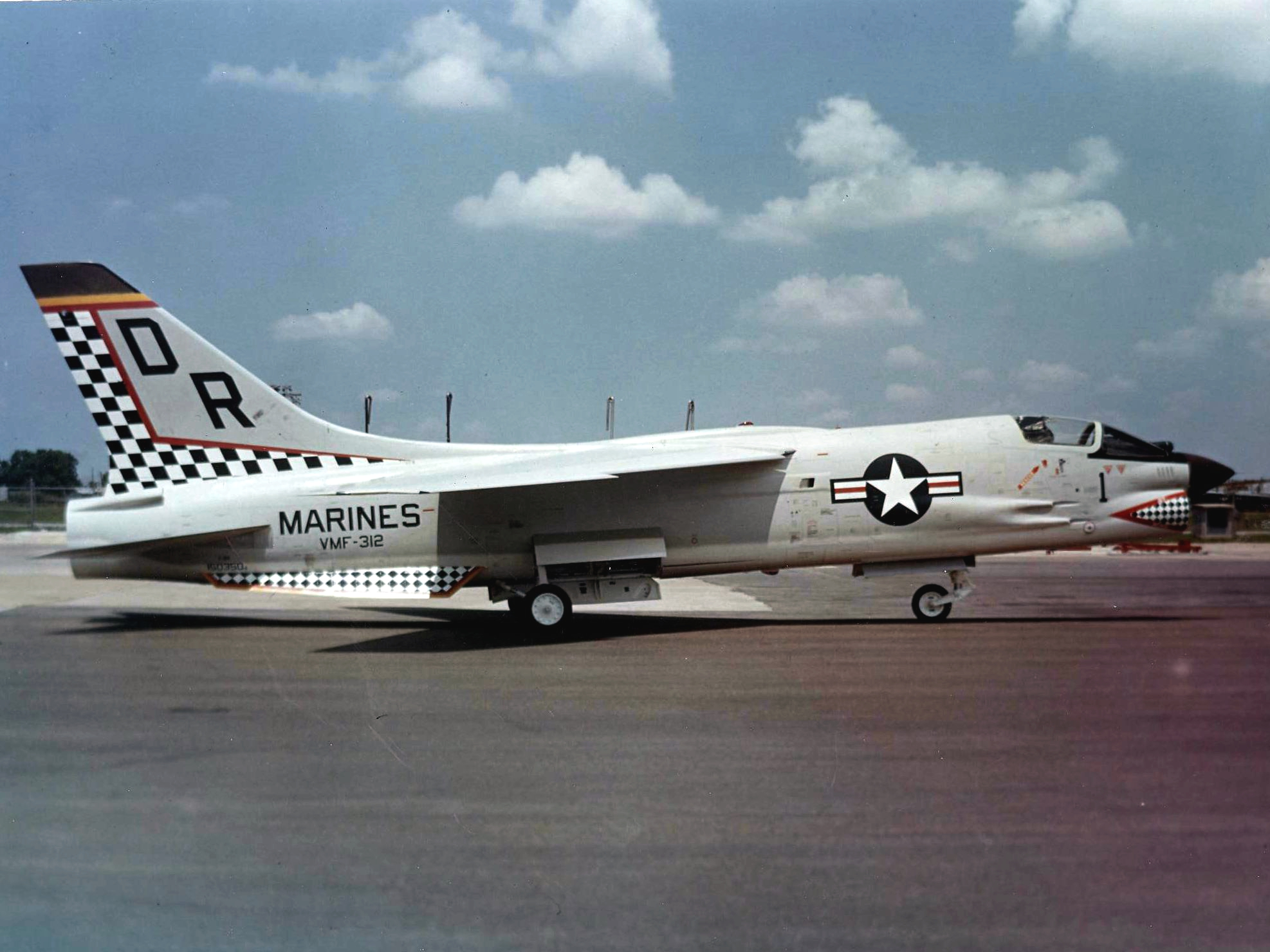
An F-8E Crusader of VMF-312, ca. 1964.

The Panthers were replaced with FJ-2 Furies and later FJ-3 Furies, while they in their turn were being replaced in mid-1959 by F8U-1 Crusaders. Concurrent with the reassignment in February 1966 to MCAS Beaufort was the transition to yet another aircraft, the F-4B Phantom II, and redesignation as Marine Fighter Attack Squadron (VMFA-312). Crewed with a pilot and Radar Intercept Officer, and capable of speeds of up to mach 2, the Phantom served with VMFA-312 for over 20 years.

During the Vietnam War, the "Checkerboards" performed the vital mission of training combat aircrews prior to their deployment to Southeast Asia. In 1973, the squadron received the newer F-4J aircraft, with its much improved radar and avionics, as well as improved aerodynamic design.

In 1979, the Checkerboards became the first 2nd Marine Aircraft Wing fighter squadron to deploy to the Western Pacific under the Unit Deployment Program (UDP). Since joining the UDP cycle, VMFA-312 has made five six-month deployments to the Western Pacific as well as participated in numerous training deployments around the United States. Upon completion of the first six-month UDP rotation, the Checkerboards became the first squadron to receive the F-4S variant of the Phantom, which incorporated leading edge slats as well as advanced radar. In July 1987, VMFA-312 retired its F-4 aircraft and transitioned to the F/A-18A Hornet.

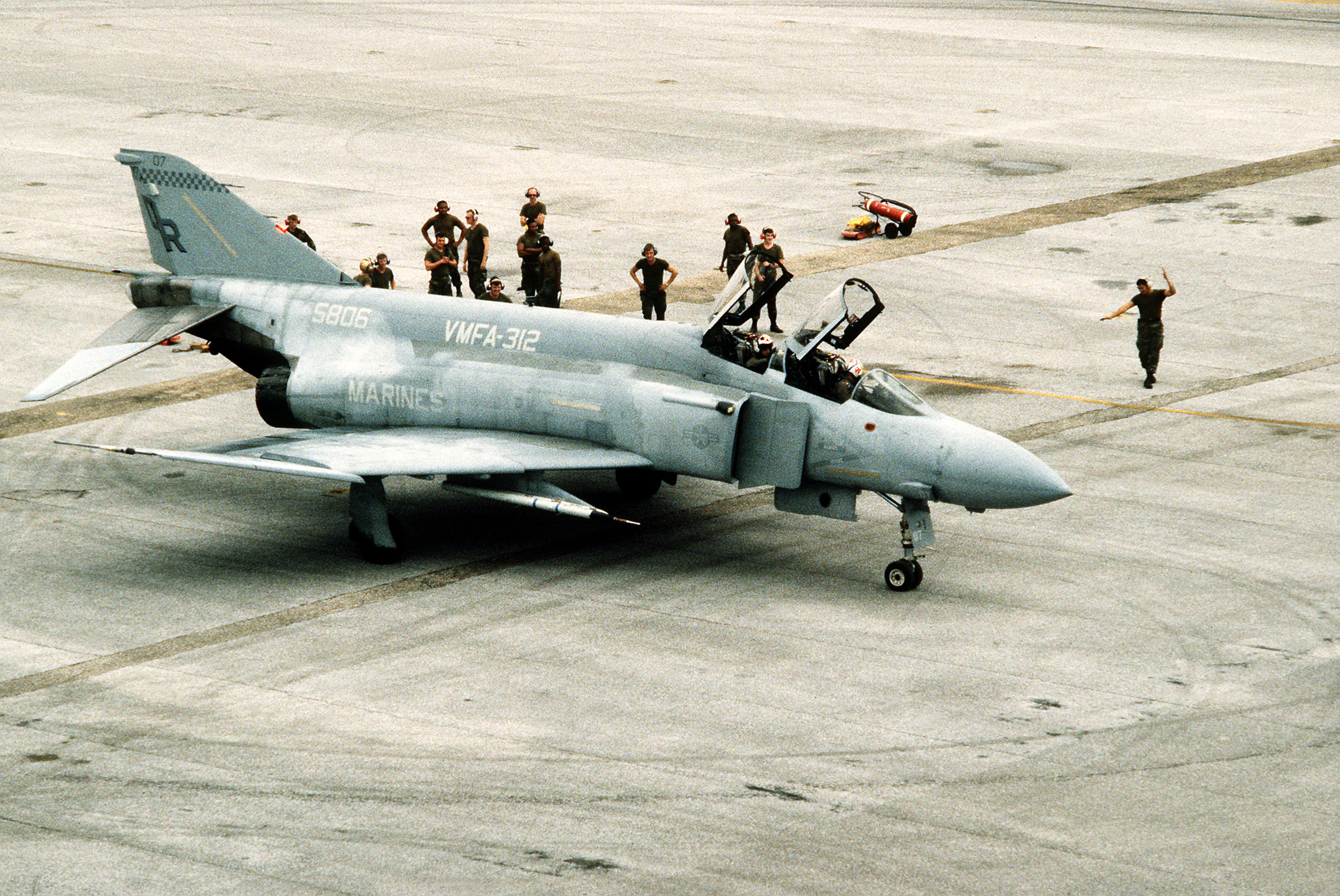
VMFA-312 F-4S in 1986.

In 1993, VMFA-312 participated in Operation Provide Promise and Operation Deny Flight over Yugoslavia. They also flew missions over Iraq in support of Operation Southern Watch while operating from the Red Sea.

In March 1995, the squadron deployed once again with Carrier Air Wing 8 aboard Theodore Roosevelt for its second consecutive Mediterranean deployment. During the cruise, VMFA-312 participated in Operations Southern Watch from the Red Sea and Persian Gulf, then Operation Sharp Guard and Operation Deny Flight from the Adriatic Sea.

In late August and September 1995, the "Checkerboards" conducted their first direct combat sorties since Vietnam in support of the United Nations resolutions in Operation Deliberate Force. NATO's decision to conduct immediate air strikes against Bosnian-Serb ammunition bunkers, communication and control facilities, and logistical storage buildings heavily tasked both the air wing and the Checkerboards.

The Checkerboards along with CVW-3 began missions in support of Operation Southern Watch, on 27 November 1998. The mission would change as the order came down to commence Operation Desert Fox, 16 December 1998. The air campaign lasted four nights and would end with the following: (1) 100% sortie completion rate, (2) 44 combat night sorties, (3) 120.2 combat hours, (4) 74% of assigned targets destroyed, (5) 27 HARM fired, 53 LGBs dropped, the first combat deployment of the AGM-154 JSOW and (6) over 95,500 lb of ordnance loaded. In the four nights of operations, the "Checkerboards" had zero injuries or casualties.

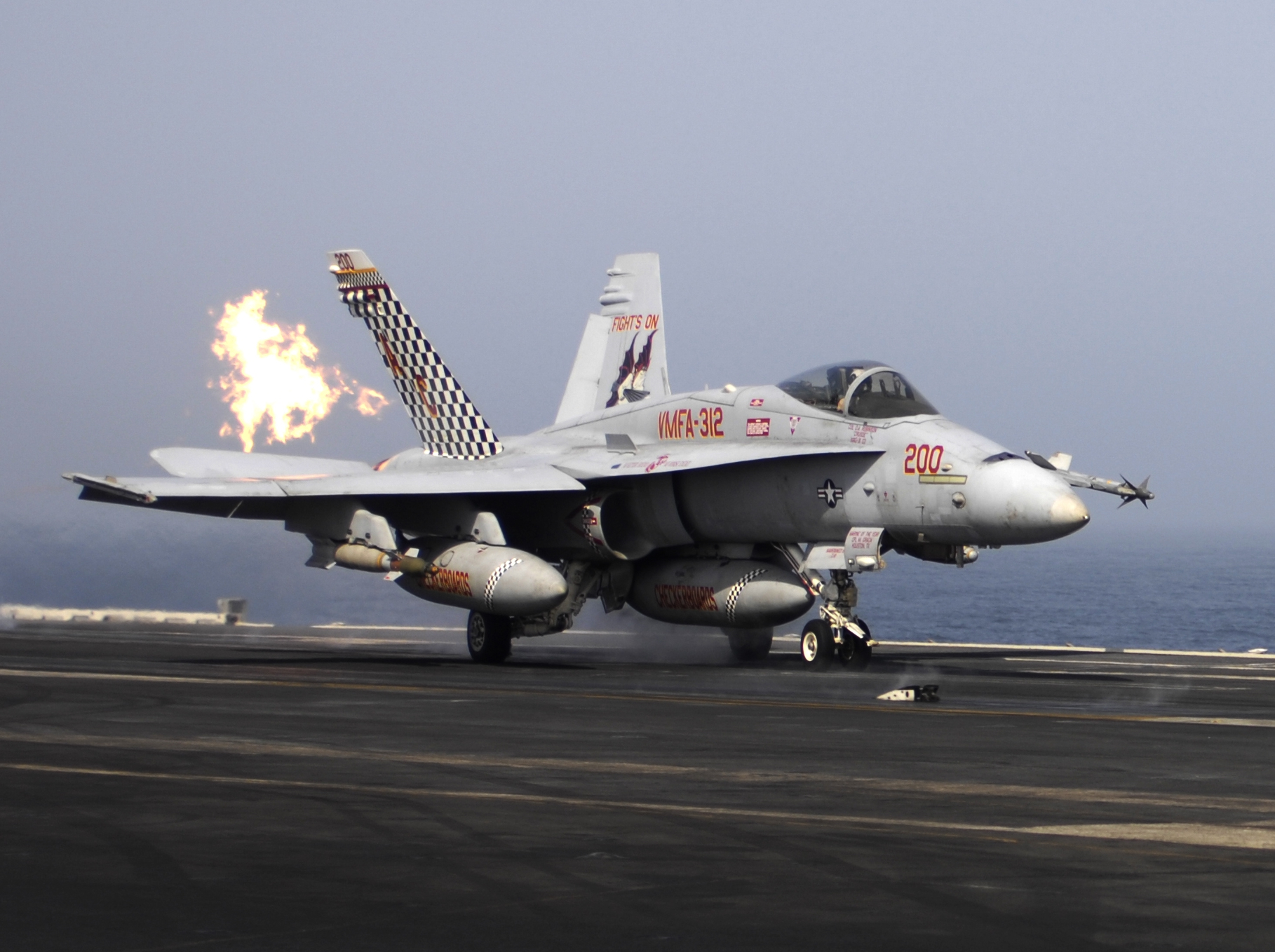
An F/A-18C of VMFA-312 launches from USS Harry S. Truman (CVN-75), in 2010.

Carrier Air Wing Three entered the North Persian Gulf and began Operation Southern Watch missions on 3 January 2001. On 20 January, a VMFA-312 jet destroyed an anti-aircraft artillery site, which was threatening coalition aircraft in Southern Iraq. On 16 February, five VMFA-312 aircraft participated in a large force strike against numerous targets in the vicinity of Baghdad.

=== Global war on terror ===
The Checkerboards Joined Carrier Air Wing One (CVW-1) in February 2003 deploying aboard Enterprise in August 2003. The squadron arrived in the Persian Gulf in October and began supporting Operation Iraqi Freedom (OIF). In November, VMFA-312 became the first squadron in the carrier air-wing to release ordnance in support of OIF. The Checkerboards remained in their area of operations until the end of January before transiting towards home.

The Checkerboards deployed several more times in support of Operation Iraqi Freedom and Operation Enduring Freedom throughout the Global War on Terror. They deployed in 2010 aboard the Harry S. Truman and aboard the Theodore Roosevelt in 2017-2018.

In accordance with the Aviation Plan, the Checkerboards will begin transitioning to the F-35B Lightning II in fiscal year 2028 and complete the transition no later than FY2029.

== Notable former members ==
- Herbert J. Valentine – 6 kills
- William Farrell – 5 kills
- Phillip C. DeLong – 2 kills in Korea
- Robert R. Klingman - pilot with VMF-312 who was famous for destroying a Japanese reconnaissance plane using the propeller of his F4U Corsair during the Battle of Okinawa.
- Kenneth L. Reusser

== See also ==
- United States Marine Corps Aviation
- List of active United States Marine Corps aircraft squadrons
- List of inactive United States Marine Corps aircraft squadrons
