= VMFAT-501 =

Marine Fighter Attack Training Squadron 501
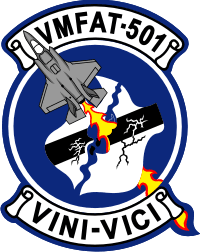
- VMFAT-501 insignia
- Active: 15 February 1944 – 10 September 1945; 1 July 1946 - 31 January 1997; 1 April 2010 - present
- Country: United States
- Branch: United States Marine Corps
- Type: Attack
- Role: Close air support Air interdiction Aerial reconnaissance
- Part of: Marine Aircraft Group 31; 2nd Marine Aircraft Wing
- Nicknames: "Warlords" "Blue Devils" "Fightin Phillies"
- Motto: "Vini Vici"
- Tail Code: BM / VM
- Engagements: World War II; Operation Desert Storm

Commanders
- Commanding Officer: LtCol Thomas K. Whitesel
- Executive Officer: Maj Ryan M. Zsido

Aircraft flown
- Fighter: F4U-1D Corsair; F6F-5 Hellcat; F9F-2 Panther; FJ-2/4 Fury; F-8 Crusader; F-4J Phantom II; F/A-18A Hornet; F-35B Lightning II

Marine Fighter Attack Training Squadron 501 (VMFAT-501) is a training squadron in the United States Marine Corps, consisting of 27 F-35B Lightning II aircraft and serves as the Fleet Replacement Squadron. Known as the "Warlords," the squadron is based at Marine Corps Air Station Beaufort, South Carolina and falls administratively under Marine Aircraft Group 31 and the 2nd Marine Aircraft Wing. The squadron has assumed the lineage of VMFA-451 which was originally known as the "Blue Devils" and saw action during World War II and Operation Desert Storm. They were decommissioned on 31 January 1997.

== History ==
=== World War II ===
Marine Fighting Squadron 451 (VMF-451) was activated on 15 February 1944 at Marine Corps Air Station Mojave, California. The "Blue Devils" were one of 32 squadrons that trained at the base, and were collectively known as the "Mojave Marines". Equipped with the Chance-Vought F4U-1D Corsair, they spent nearly a year training for carrier-based operations under the command of Major Henry A. Ellis Jr., who remained the Commanding Officer for 17 months.

The squadron moved on board USS Bunker Hill (CV-17) on 24 January 1945, along with VF-84 and VMF-221. This was the first fast-carrier deployment with three Corsair squadrons. As a new member of CVG-84, collectively known as the "Wolf Gang", CV-17 sailed westward across the Pacific. They flew their first combat sorties on 16 February, against targets near Tokyo. The "Blue Devils" scored their first kill during the initial combat mission, but also suffered their first casualty. Lieutenant Forrest P. Brown was shot down by anti-aircraft fire, and was last seen floating in the water. On 18 March, they focused their fury on Kyushu, destroying the Myazaki and Omura air fields and bagging another kill. On 3 April, the "Blue Devils" had a field day in knocking down 11 Japanese planes, and on 12 April, they brought down 16 kamikazes. Major Archie Donahue, the XO, shot down three Vals and two Zekes, thus becoming the first carrier-based Marine "ace-in-a-day" and adding to the nine previous kills that he scored with VMF-112 in 1943. 11 May was pivotal for VMF-451 and the other "Wolf Gang" members of Bunker Hill. It started on a positive note, as First Lieutenant J.S. Norris Jr. shot down a Zeke near Amami, bringing VMF-451's score to 34 confirmed kills. At 1005 hours, Bunker Hill was struck by two kamikazes, each carrying a bomb that was released prior to impact. Bunker Hill immediately began to burn and the smoke attracted more kamikazes. However, none of the suicide planes were able to penetrate the flak, and Bunker Hill was spared any more hits. The flames were eventually extinguished and CV-17 limped back to Ulithi, then Pearl Harbor, and finally arrived for battle-damage repair at Puget Sound, Washington, on 3 June 1945. VMF-451 rejoined the ground echelon at Marine Corps Air Station El Toro to remain until the end of the war. They earned a Presidential Unit Citation for their efforts in the Japan, Bonins and Ryukyus campaigns, and were deactivated on 10 September 1945.

=== 1950s ===
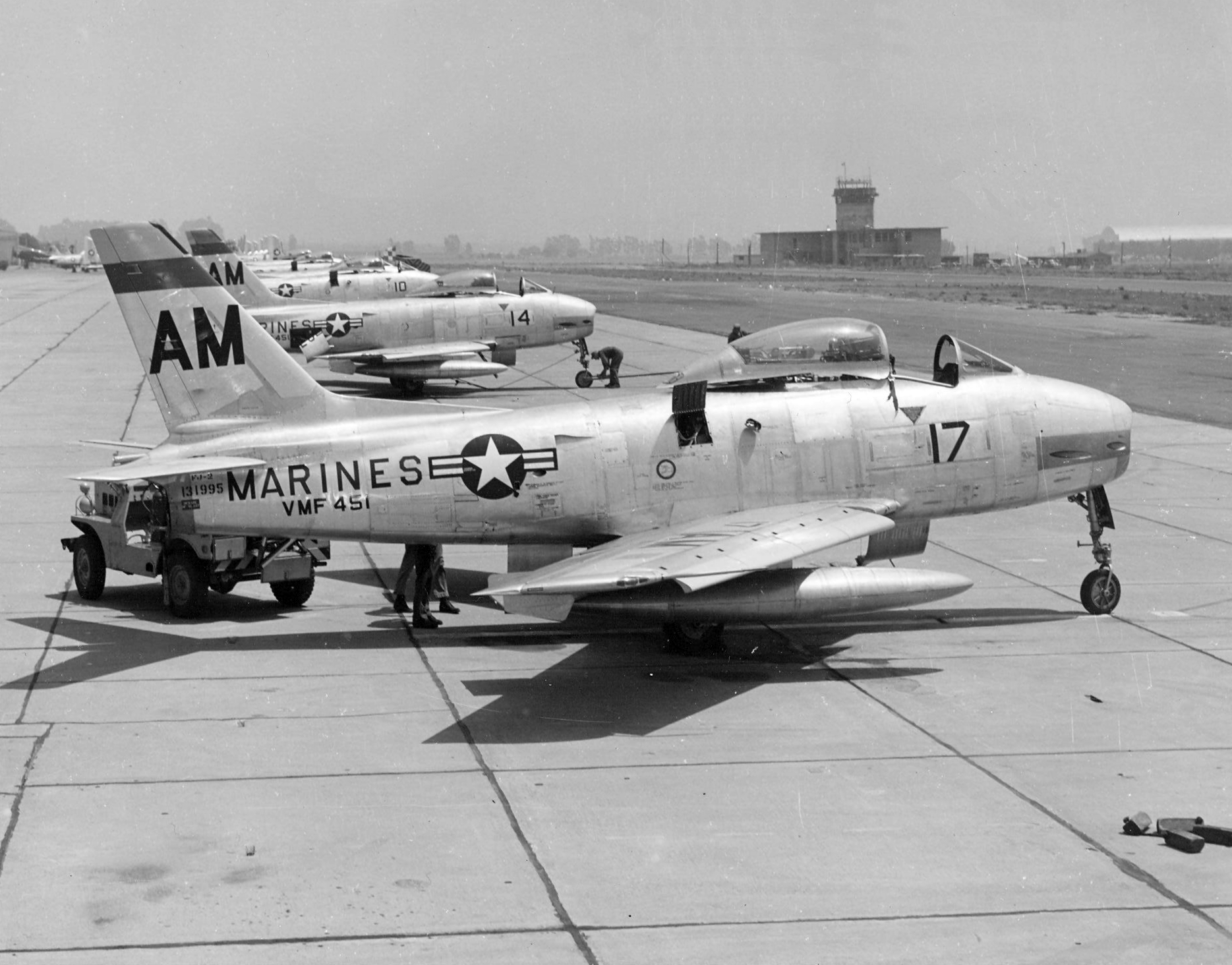
VMF-451 FJ-2 Furies, in 1954.

On 1 July 1946, the "Fightin’ Phillies" were reactivated as a reserve unit at Naval Air Station Willow Grove, Pennsylvania, equipped with the Grumman F6F-5 Hellcat. They remained as a reserve squadron until hostilities broke out in Korea. On 1 March 1951, the unit was recalled to active duty and equipped with the Grumman F9F-2 Panther. VMF-451 was relocated to MCAS El Toro, and periodically deployed to Marine Corps Air Station Kaneohe Bay, Hawaii.

In October 1954, VMF-451 upgraded to the North American FJ-2 Fury, and adopted the name "Warlords", redesigning their unit insignia to feature a jet punching through a Carling beer label and sporting the motif, "Vini, Vici" meaning "we conquered some wine" as opposed to "Veni, Vici" which means "I came, I conquered". On 20 October, the "Warlords" craned their Furys on board USS Corregidor (CVE-58), along with the "Death Angels" of VMF-235, to deploy to NAF Atsugi, Japan. In 1956, VMF-451 became the first Marine squadron to receive the upgraded FJ-4 Fury. The following year, the tailcode AM was changed to VM. In June 1957, the "Death Rattlers" of VMF-323 relieved them at Atsugi, and took possession of their airplanes. The "Warlords" then returned to MCAS El Toro and claimed VMF-323's aircraft, remaining there until 15 September 1958, when they relieved VMF-323 at Ping Tung, Southern Taiwan, and reclaimed their Furys. The "Warlords" were on station at the end of the Taiwan Straits crisis and returned with their FJ-4s to MCAS El Toro in November 1959 after brief carrier qualifications on board USS Lexington (CVA-16).

=== 1960s & 1970s ===
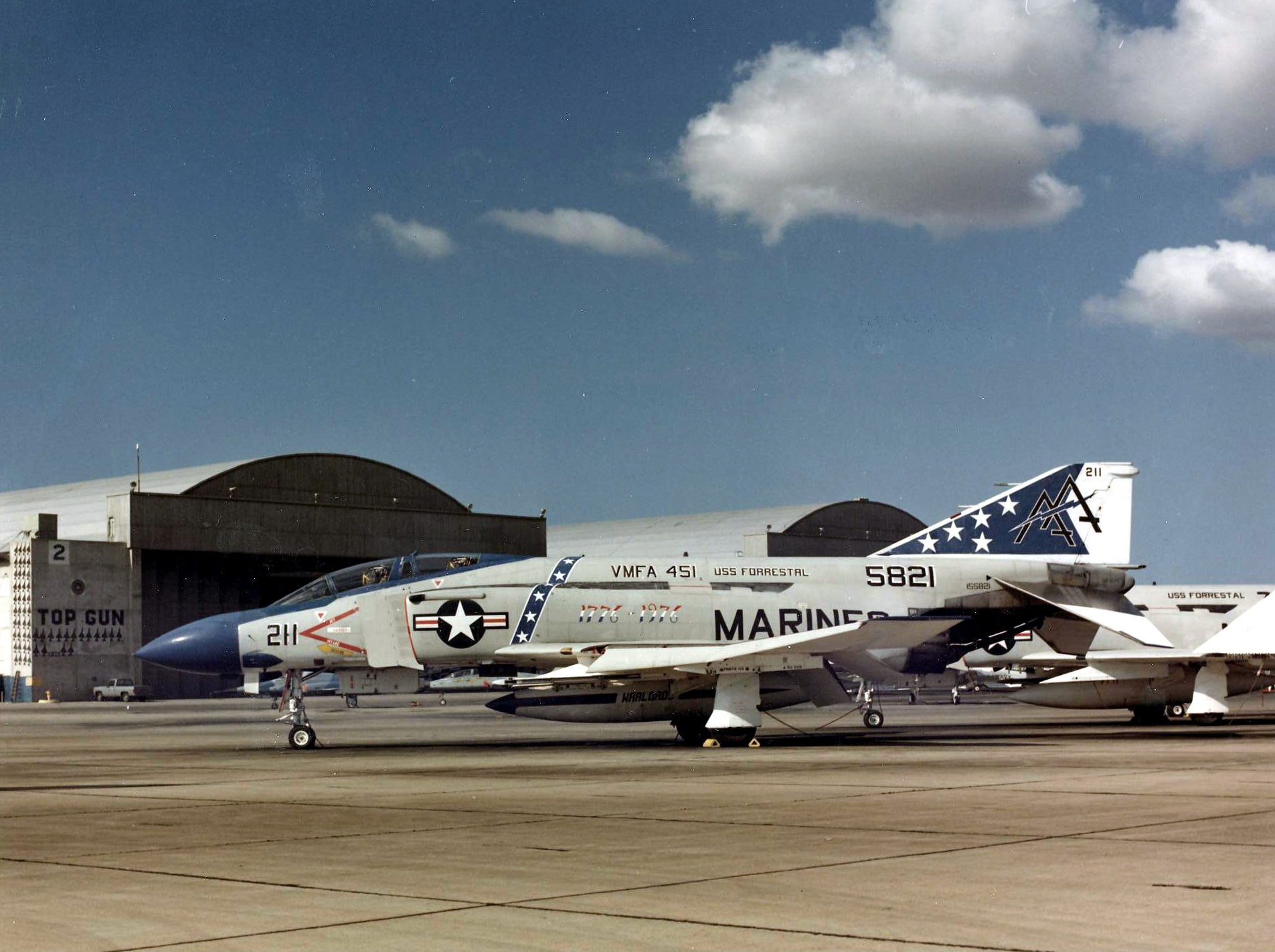
An F-4J of VMFA-451 at Naval Air Station Miramar, in 1976.

While at MCAS El Toro, VMF-451 upgraded from the FJ-4 Fury to the supersonic Vought F8U-2 Crusader, flying the day fighter for 18 months before upgrading once again to the F8U-2N all-weather variant, and were redesignated Marine Fighter Squadron (All Weather) 451 (VMF(AW)-451). On 4 January 1962, the squadron deployed to Naval Air Station Atsugi, but instead of being packed aboard a carrier for a 45-day journey, the "Warlords" became the first squadron to make use of the new KC-130 Hercules for air-to-air refuelling as they flew their aircraft to Japan, arriving seven days later. The "Warlords" remained in the Far East until 1 February 1963, when they were ordered to Marine Corps Air Station Beaufort, South Carolina.

On 24 August 1965, VMF(AW)-451, with the AJ tailcode, deployed aboard USS Forrestal (CVA-59) for a Mediterranean cruise, before returning to MCAS Beaufort on 7 April 1966. On 1 February 1968, the "Warlords" turned in their Crusaders in favor of the McDonnell Douglas F-4J Phantom II. With the new aircraft came the new designation, Marine Fighter Attack Squadron 451 (VMFA-451). In July 1976, the squadron was slated to return to their former home, USS Forrestal (CV-59), with their Phantoms painted in bicentennial markings and sporting Carrier Air Wing 17's AA tailcode. However, the Med cruise was cancelled and the unit returned to MCAS Beaufort.

=== 1980s & 1990s ===
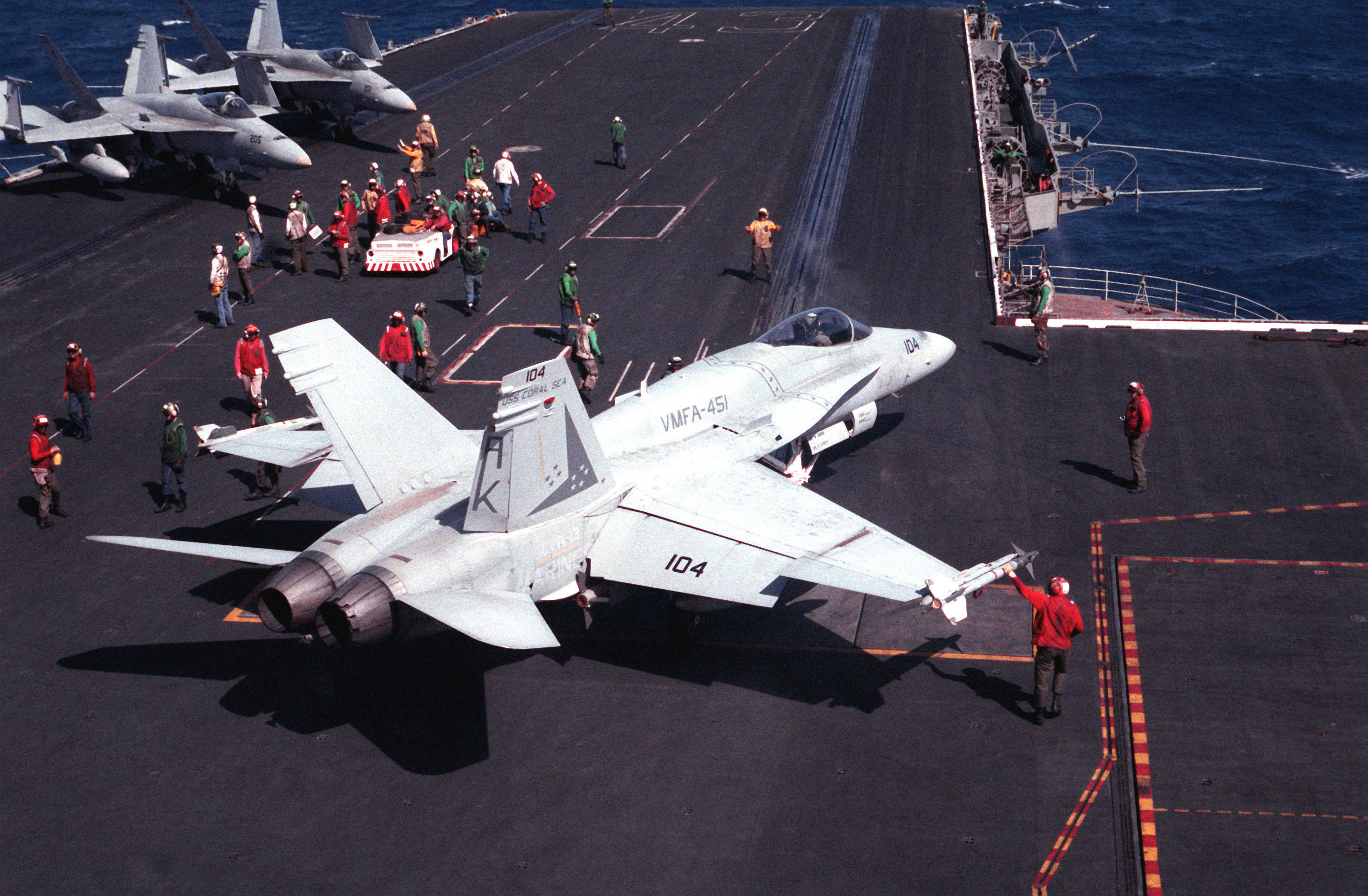
An F/A-18A of VMFA-451 on the USS Coral Sea in 1989.

In 1984, VMFA-451 set a safety record of 29,000 accident-free hours in the Phantom. After 21 years in the venerable "Rhino", and led by Alfred Cunningham award winner Lieutenant Colonel T.D. Seder, the "Warlords" exchanged their McDonnell Douglas F-4S Phantom II for the F/A-18 Hornet in September 1987. In May 1989, the squadron again sailed with the USS Coral Sea (CV-43) for a Med Cruise to end an eight-year absence of Beaufort-based Marine units on carriers. During the cruise, VMFA-451 learned it was the recipient of the 1988 Hanson award as the outstanding Marine fighter-attack squadron, as they surpassed 40,000 accident-free hours. The squadron returned to Beaufort in September 1989.

On 23 August 1990, VMFA-451 deployed to Bahrain in support of Operation Desert Shield. At 0300 on 17 January 1991, the "Warlords" became the first Marine unit to attack Iraqi forces in Operation Desert Storm. The commanding officer, Lieutenant Colonel A.S. "Scotty" Dudley, led a four-plane strike as part of a larger 50-aircraft strike force under Marine Aircraft Group 11. The "Warlords" ended the operation with 770 combat sorties and 1,400 combat hours. They returned to MCAS Beaufort with all aircraft and personnel.

VMFA-451 spent the remaining six years leading up to deactivation on the East Coast, making periodic deployments that included exercises in Norway. They returned from the Western Pacific in late July 1996, and from there, wound down a 57-year history. The "Warlords" of VMFA-451 were deactivated on 31 January 1997.

=== Reactivation as a training squadron ===
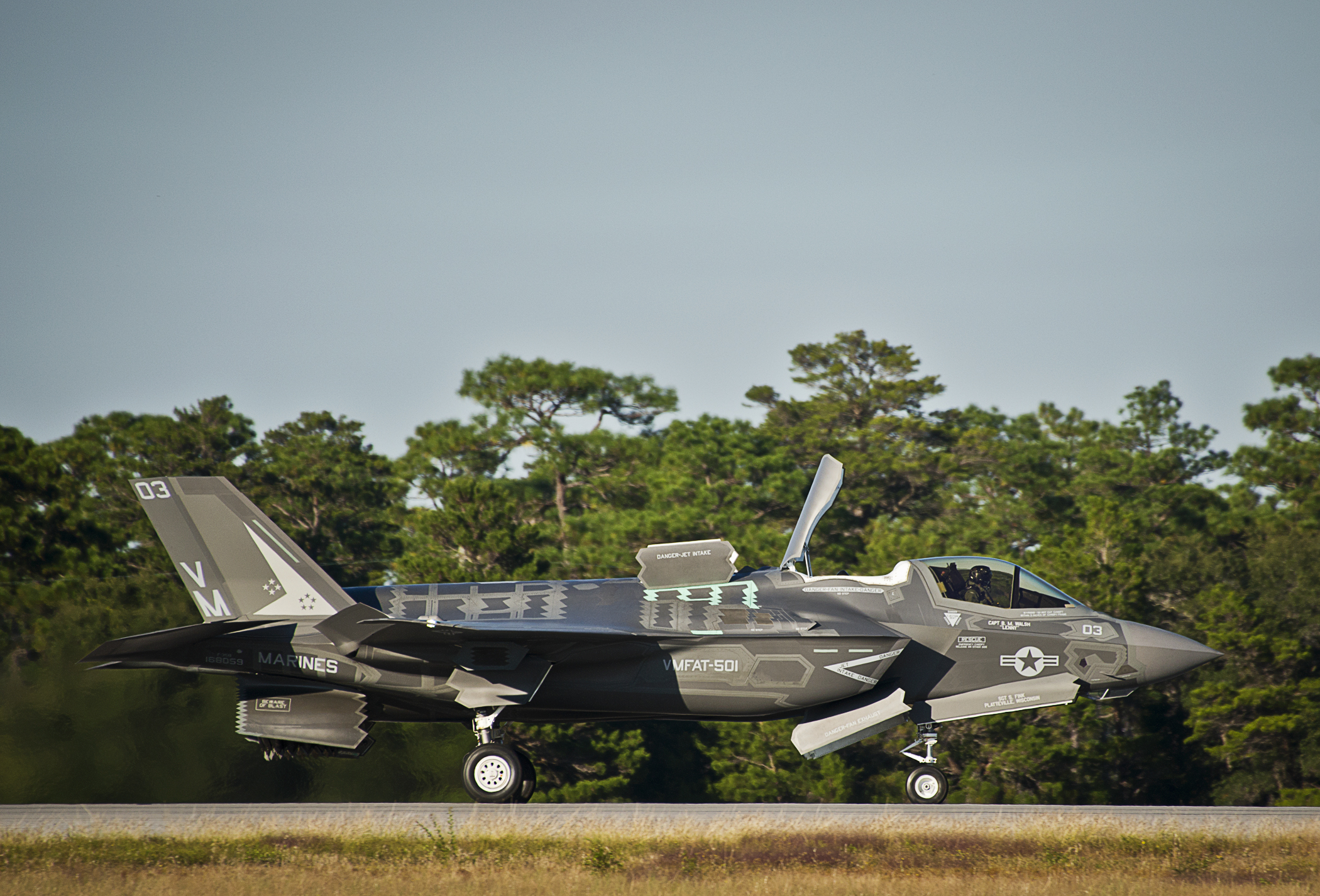
A VMFAT-501 F-35B in 2013.

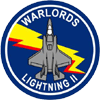
VMFAT-501 shoulder patch

On 1 April 2010, the squadron was reactivated and redesignated as VMFAT-501 at a ceremony at the National Museum of Naval Aviation at Naval Air Station Pensacola, Florida. The squadron serves as the F-35B Lightning II Fleet Replacement Squadron.

Initially stationed at Eglin Air Force Base in Florida, it previously fell administratively under Marine Aircraft Group 31 (MAG-31), but operationally under the U.S. Air Force's 33d Fighter Wing, which controls all F-35A training for the Air Force and previously controlled all F-35B and F-35C training for the Department of the Navy.

VMFAT-501 moved back to its permanent home of MCAS Beaufort in July 2014 and now falls under MAG-31 both administratively and operationally.

=== September 2018 crash ===
On 28 September 2018, A F-35B crashed near MCAS Beaufort in which the pilot safely ejected. The entire F-35 fleet was grounded to inspect all F135-PW-600 engines. An investigation found the cause was a manufacturing defect in an engine fuel tube which would rupture and cause loss of power. This was the first crash of a F-35.

== See also ==
- United States Marine Corps Aviation
- List of inactive United States Marine Corps aircraft squadrons
- List of active United States Marine Corps aircraft squadrons
