= James F. Amos =

35th commandant of the Marine Corps (born 1946)

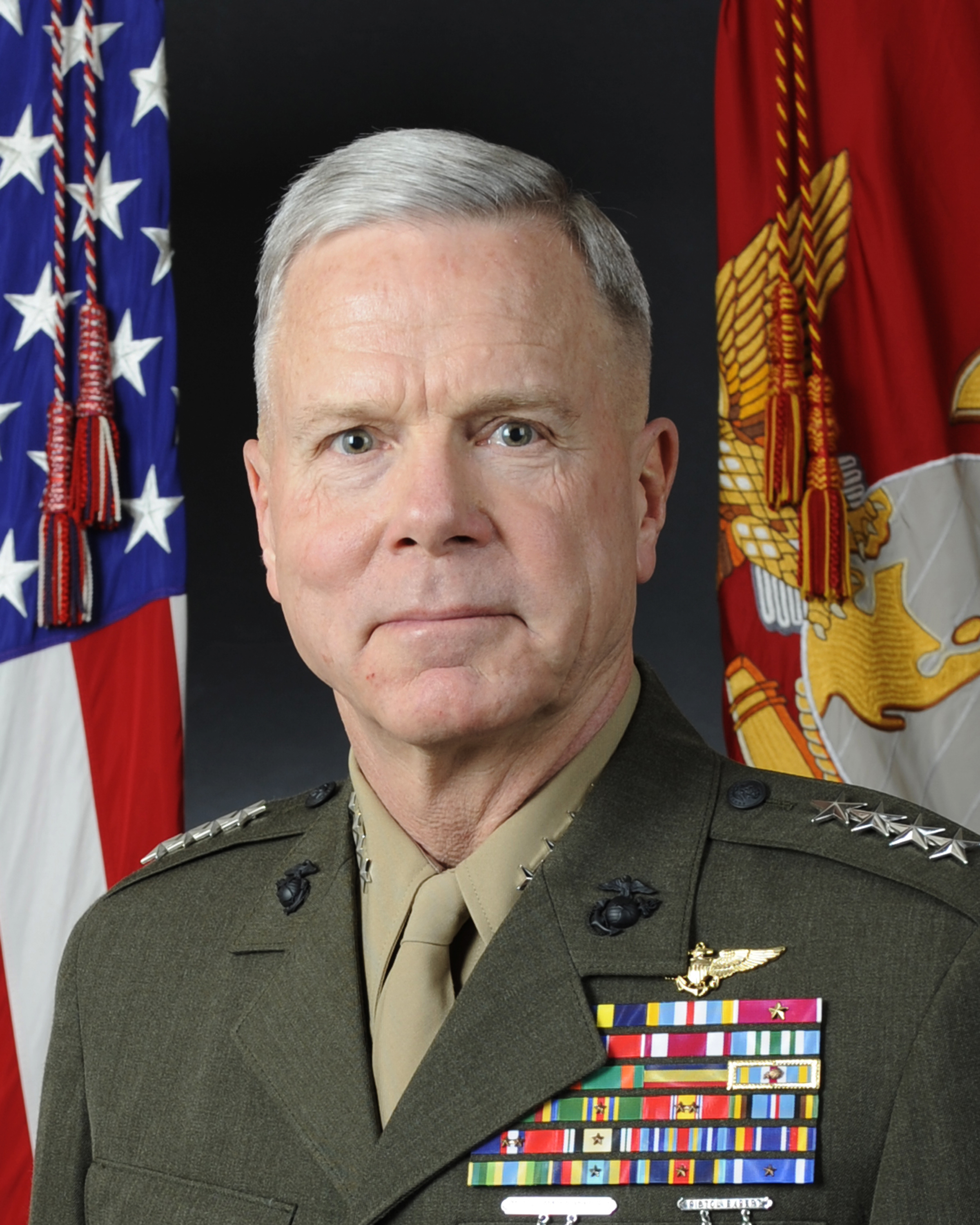
- Official portrait, 2010
- Born: November 12, 1946 (age 80); Wendell, Idaho, U.S.
- Military career
- Allegiance: United States
- Branch: United States Navy (1970–1972); United States Marine Corps (1972–1978, 1981–2014)
- Service years: 1970–1978; 1981–2014
- Rank: General
- Nicknames: "Jim", "Tamer"
- Commands: Commandant of the Marine Corps; Assistant Commandant of the Marine Corps; Marine Corps Combat Development Command; II Marine Expeditionary Force; 3rd Marine Aircraft Wing; Marine Aircraft Group 31; VMFA-312
- Conflicts: Kosovo War; Iraq War
- Awards: Defense Distinguished Service Medal; Navy Distinguished Service Medal (2); Defense Superior Service Medal; Legion of Merit (2); Bronze Star Medal

James F. "Jim" Amos (born November 12, 1946) is a retired United States Marine Corps four-star general who served as the 35th commandant of the Marine Corps. As a naval aviator, Amos commanded the 3rd Marine Aircraft Wing during the Iraq War in 2003 and 2006. He served as the 31st assistant commandant of the Marine Corps from 2008 to 2010, and was the first Marine Corps aviator to serve as commandant. He retired from the Marine Corps in December 2014.

== Early life and education ==
The son of a career navy pilot, Amos was born on November 12, 1946, in Wendell, Idaho. He graduated from the University of Idaho in 1970 with a Bachelor of Science degree in finance and economics, and was commissioned as an ensign in the United States Navy through Naval Reserve Officers Training Corps on January 23, 1970. He attended pilot training in Pensacola, Florida, and was designated a Naval Aviator on November 23, 1971. He was promoted to lieutenant junior grade in December 1971, and was subsequently granted an inter-service transfer to the United States Marine Corps in 1972. Following his transfer, Amos did not attend The Basic School.

== Marine career ==
Joining Marine Fighter Attack Squadron 212 (VMFA-212) in the spring of 1972, Amos's ensuing operational assignments included tours with VMFA-235, VMFA-232, and VMFA-122, where he flew the F-4 Phantom II. In the fall of 1978, Amos left the active Marine Corps to become a commercial pilot for Braniff International Airways. He was employed with Braniff for 25 months, returning to the Marine Corps in January 1981.

After a three-year posting as a flight instructor in advanced jet training, attendance at the Armed Forces Staff College in Norfolk, Virginia, as a major, and a 13-month overseas staff assignment to the III Marine Amphibious Force, Okinawa, Japan, Amos was transferred to Marine Aircraft Group 24, Kaneohe Bay, Hawaii. Promoted to lieutenant colonel, he assumed command of Marine Air Base Squadron 24, later re-designated as Marine Wing Support Squadron 173. Joining VMFA-212, in 1987, Lieutenant Colonel Amos deployed to the Western Pacific as the squadron's executive officer for what would be called "Operation Last Dance," the last overseas deployment of the Marine F-4 Phantom before it was phased out and retired.

Transitioning to the F/A-18 Hornet in the spring of 1990, Amos assumed command of the Marine Fighter Attack Squadron 312 VMFA-312, and took delivery of 12 new F/A-18C aircraft, becoming the Marine Corps’ first single-seat Night Attack Hornet squadron. In the summer of 1992, he and his squadron joined Carrier Air Wing Eight on board the USS Theodore Roosevelt (CVN-71). The squadron's strong performance was recognized in 1993 with the awarding of the Marine Corps Aviation Association's Hanson Trophy, recognizing 312 as the Marine Corps' top fighter/attack squadron. Following a two-year staff instructor assignment at Quantico, Virginia, where he was promoted to colonel, Amos took command of Marine Aircraft Group 31, Beaufort, South Carolina in May 1996.

Promoted to brigadier general in 1998, Amos was assigned to NATO as the deputy commander, Naval Striking Forces, Southern Europe in Naples, Italy. During this tour, he commanded NATO's Kosovo Verification and Coordination Center in Skopje, North Macedonia, and later served as the Chief of Staff, U.S. Joint Task Force Noble Anvil during the air campaign over Yugoslavia and Kosovo. Transferred to the Pentagon in the summer of 2000, Amos's other one-star assignments included posting as the Assistant Deputy Commandant for Aviation in 2000, and the Assistant Deputy Commandant for Plans, Policies and Operations in 2001.

In August 2002, Amos was promoted to major general and assumed command of the 15,000 Marines of the 3rd Marine Aircraft Wing based out of Miramar, California, leading them in combat twice between 2003 and 2004 during Operations Iraqi Freedom I and II. Receiving his third star in 2004, Lieutenant General Amos assumed command of the 45,000+ Marines and sailors of the II Marine Expeditionary Force at Camp Lejeune, North Carolina. In 2006, he was reassigned as the commanding general, Marine Corps' Combat Development Command, and as the deputy commandant for combat development and integration, at Quantico, Virginia, where he was responsible for the training of all Marines, their combat units, their continuing education, and for the identification of all Marine equipment requirements.

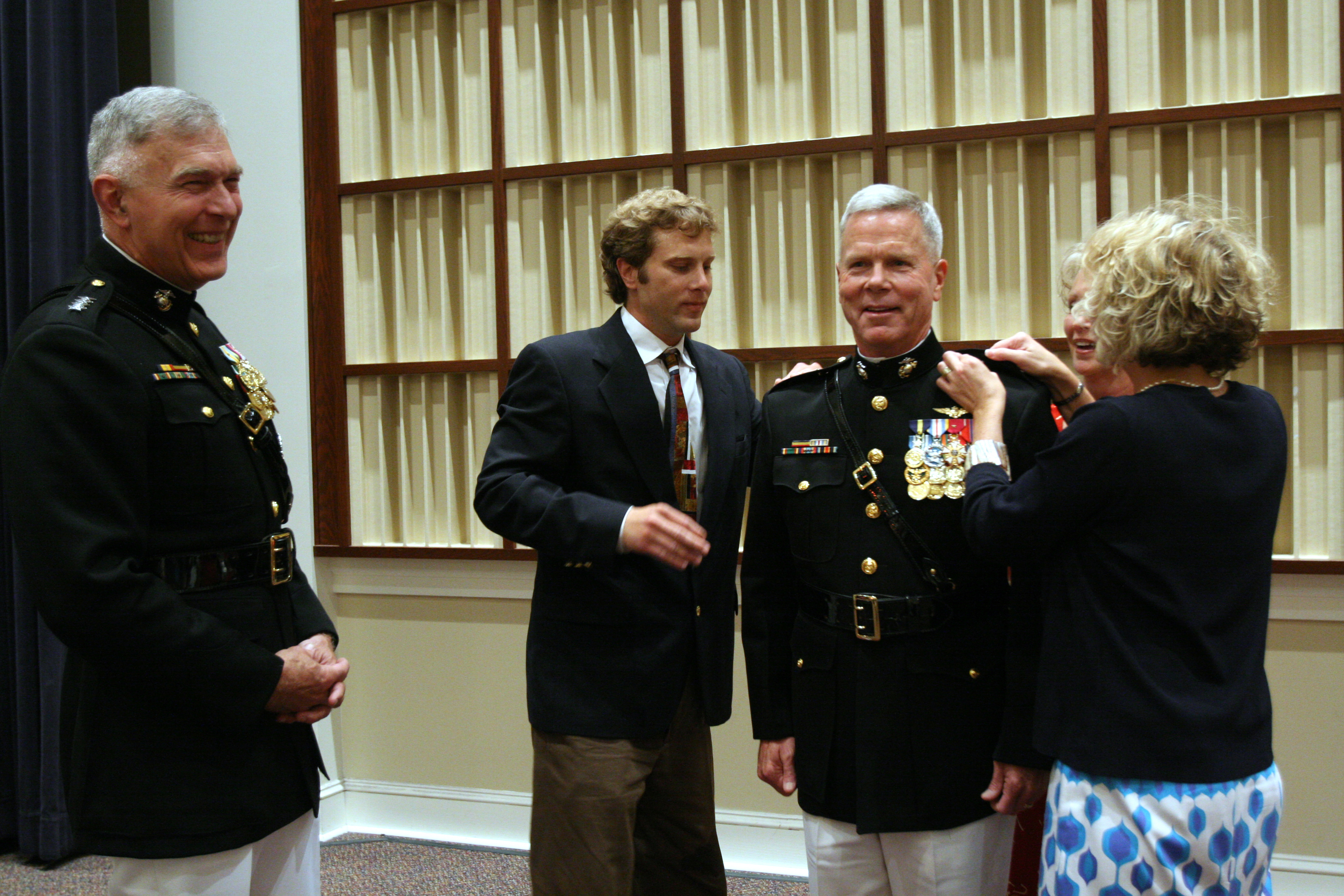
Lt. Gen. Amos enjoys a laugh with Gen. James T. Conway as he is pinned a four-star general by his wife, Bonnie, daughter, Jaymie and son, Joshua, during a promotion ceremony at Marine Barracks Washington July 2, 2008.

Receiving his fourth star in July 2008, Amos assumed duties as the 31st Assistant Commandant of the Marine Corps, based at the Pentagon in Arlington, Virginia. In June 2010, Amos was recommended Secretary of Defense Robert Gates for nomination as the 35th Commandant of the Marine Corps. Amos was nominated by President Barack Obama on July 20, who interviewed him for the job on June 17. and confirmed by the Senate Armed Services Committee on September 21, and confirmed shortly thereafter. On October 22, 2010, in a ceremony at Marine Barracks, Washington, D.C., Amos assumed the position as commandant. This marked the first time a Marine aviator had held the position of commandant, and the first time since 1983 that a sitting assistant commandant had moved up to become commandant.

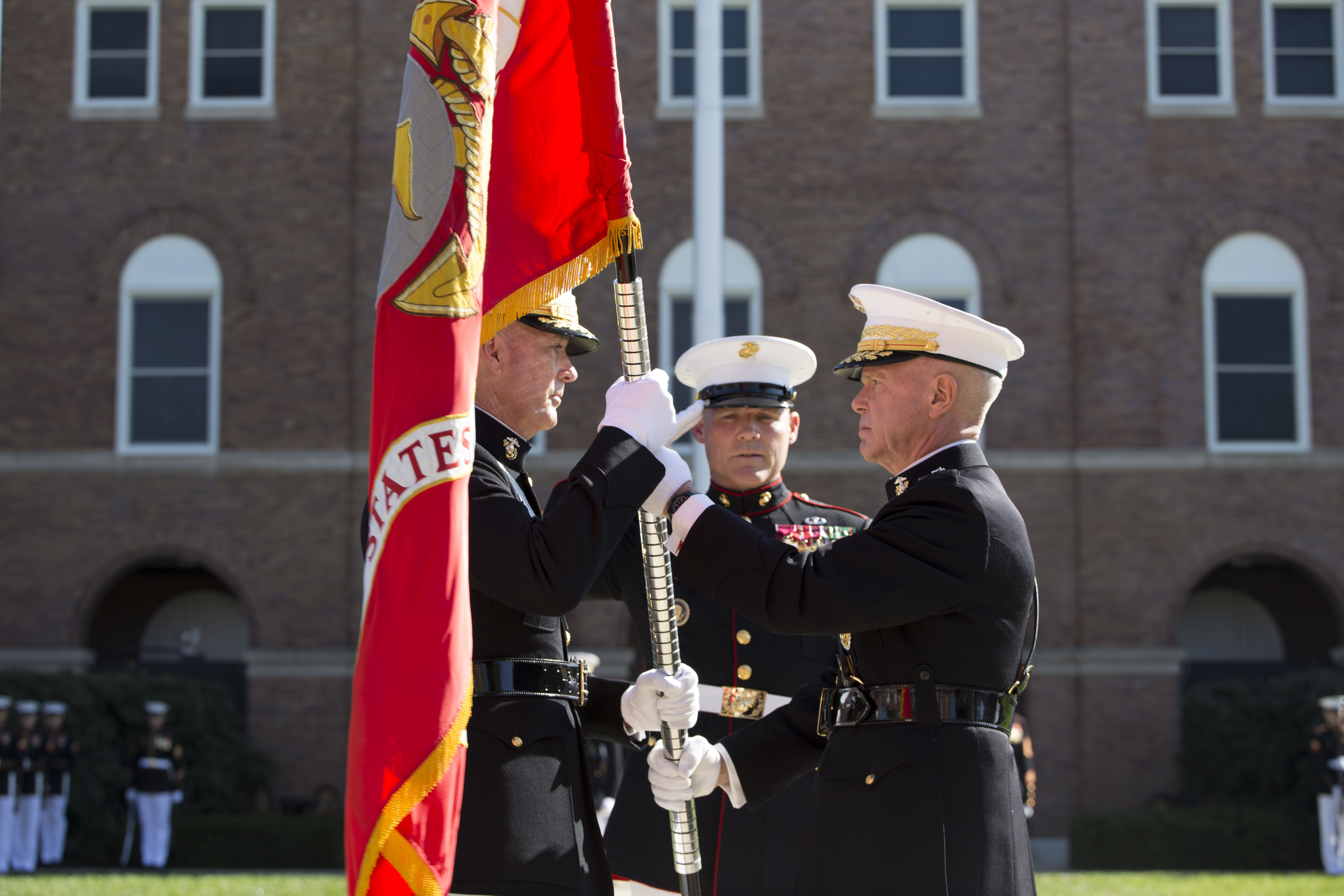
Amos exchanges the Battle Colors of the Marine Corps with incoming Commandant General Joseph Dunford on October 17, 2014

During his tenure as Commandant of the Marine Corps, Amos oversaw the conclusion of the Marine Corps’ combat mission in Afghanistan. Amid the implementation of spending reductions under the Budget Control Act, he worked to reorganize the Corps during a period of fiscal constraint while maintaining its readiness for expeditionary and crisis response operations. He also established Special Purpose Marine Air-Ground Task Force–Crisis Response units in Africa and the Middle East and increased the number of Marine Security Guards assigned to protect U.S. embassies worldwide by approximately 1,000 personnel Additionally, during his final two years as commandant, he led the corps' efforts to address many challenges in recruiting and maintain diverse and talented candidates for the marines. Lastly, he raised the requirements and capacity within the Marine Corps University for all marines to attend resident Professional Military Education.

On October 17, 2014, at Marine Corps Barracks Washington, Amos relinquished command to General Joseph Dunford, who became the 36th Commandant of the Marine Corps. Secretary of the Navy Ray Mabus awarded Amos the Navy Distinguished Service Medal for his service as commandant and Secretary of Defense Chuck Hagel awarded him with the Defense Distinguished Service Medal for over 42 1/2 years of distinguished service. Amos retired from active duty on 1 December 2014.

== Tenure as commandant ==
=== F-35B, Joint Strike Fighter (JSF) ===
In November 2010, shortly after becoming commandant, Amos, along with the Chief of Naval Operations and the Chief of Staff of the United States Air Force, were notified of an over $4 billion shortfall in the JSF Program. Reacting to this and the steadily rising costs and delays in the program, Secretary of Defense Robert Gates called a meeting with Secretary of the Navy Ray Mabus and Amos, ostensibly to cancel the Marine variant, the F-35B. Amos was successful in convincing Gates of the corps' need for the aircraft and placing the F-35B on a two-year probation to allow the program to mature and right itself. Amos's detailed and hands-on actions over the next 18 months ensured positive progress on the Marine variant in most areas of concern, resulting in Secretary Leon Panetta removing the F-35B from probation six months early. As a result, the Marine Corps was the first service to be able to stand up and operationally certify a Joint Strike Fighter squadron within the DoD.

=== Shipbuilding and amphibious ships ===
After a decade plus of declining amphibious ship numbers in the U.S. Navy inventory, and increasing operational requirements for marines around the world, Amos partnered with the Chief of Naval Operations, the Navy Secretariat, and industry to reconfirm amphibious ship requirements, acceptable readiness levels, and total hull numbers. Working closely with the United States Congress, in the Senate and the House over two years of budgetary efforts, Congress authorized and appropriated monies to buy a, not-programmed, 12th San Antonio Class LPD amphibious war ship. Additionally, a memorandum of understanding was signed by the Chief of Naval Operations, the Secretary of the Navy, and Amos agreeing to recapitalizing the Navy's more than 40-year-old LSD amphibious ships with the new, and proven, San Antonio Class hull design. This single agreement alone will result in millions of dollars saved over the lifetime of the LSD replacement effort, and will accelerate the completion and delivery of the ships years ahead of schedule.

=== Revising Marine Corps ethics ===
Sensing that 10 years of sustained combat may have begun fraying the edges of the corps' moral fabric, Amos initiated an effort to morally and ethically "reground the corps." The effort, named the "Reawakening", targeted the corps' central leadership cadre, the Non-Commissioned Officer (NCO). Amos and Sergeant Major Micheal Barrett, the Sergeant Major of the Marine Corps, spent the better part of 2013 traveling to most every Marine base to personally challenge the corps' NCO leadership with getting back to the basics. The sole focus of the Reawakening was simply to remind marines of their higher calling. Amos reinforced "who they were" as marines, "what they did for the nation", and "who they were not".

=== Unlawful Command Influence ===
Allegations of unlawful command influence in the matter of a Marine Corps scout sniper unit accused of urinating on the bodies of dead Taliban dogged Amos during and after his tenure. LtGen Thomas Waldhauser was removed as the investigating officer after objecting to being told by Amos at the outset of the investigation that "Those guys need to be crushed." Amos removed Waldhauser from the investigation the next day. Although several Marines were punished, primarily through non-judicial punishment, a military court overturned the punishment of one Marine who appealed due to Amos's unlawful command influence.

Amos was also chastised for retribution against Marine Corps defense attorney Maj. James Weirick, and Amos was grilled over his conduct during a House Armed Services Committee hearing by Rep. Walter Jones. Amos's conduct included filing a restraining order against Weirick, confiscating his personal firearms, and requiring a "voluntary" psychiatric evaluation.

=== Repeal of don't ask, don't tell ===
As commandant, Amos opposed the repeal of the "don't ask, don't tell" policy regarding homosexuals openly serving in the U.S. military. After President Obama signed the legislation setting the conditions for repeal, Amos led the Department of Defense in carrying out the will of the nation's civilian leadership. In late November 2011, Amos stated that his opposition to gays openly serving in the military has proven unfounded and said that Marines have embraced the change, describing the repeal as a "non-event."

== Personal life ==
Since retiring from the Marine Corps, Amos has joined the board of directors of the Lord Corporation, a defense contractor. He currently serves as chairman of the board of the Semper Fi Fund. He sits on the Veterans Bridge Home Advisory Board and also sits on the Board of Advisors for Operation Mend.

== Awards and decorations ==
Amos holds the rifle sharpshooter and several awards of the pistol expert marksmanship badges.

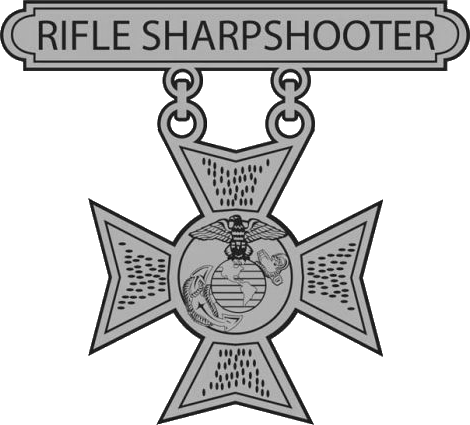

Badge	Naval Aviator insignia			
1st row	Defense Distinguished Service Medal		Navy Distinguished Service Medal w/ 1 award star	Defense Superior Service Medal
2nd row	Legion of Merit w/ 1 award star	Bronze Star Medal	Meritorious Service Medal	Joint Service Commendation Medal
3rd row	Navy and Marine Corps Achievement Medal	Navy Presidential Unit Citation	Joint Meritorious Unit Award w/ 1 oak leaf cluster	Navy Meritorious Unit Commendation w/ 1 service star
4th row	National Defense Service Medal w/ 2 service stars	Armed Forces Expeditionary Medal	Kosovo Campaign Medal w/ 2 service stars	Iraq Campaign Medal w/ 1 service star
5th row	Global War on Terrorism Expeditionary Medal	Global War on Terrorism Service Medal	Armed Forces Service Medal	Navy Sea Service Deployment Ribbon w/ 1 silver service star
6th row	Navy and Marine Corps Overseas Service Ribbon w/ 1 service star	1st Class Order of the Rising Sun, Grand Cordon	Order of the Golden Fleece (Country of Georgia)	NATO Medal for Yugoslavia w/ 1 service star
Badge	Office of the Joint Chiefs of Staff Identification Badge			

== See also ==
- List of United States Marine Corps four-star generals

== Notes ==
Military offices
Preceded by Charles Bolden	Commanding General of the 3rd Marine Aircraft Wing; 2002–2004	Succeeded by Keith J. Stalder
Preceded by Henry P. Osman	Commanding General of the II Marine Expeditionary Force; 2004–2006	Succeeded by Keith J. Stalder
Preceded by Jim Mattis	Deputy Commandant for Combat Development and Integration of the United States Marine Corps; 2006–2008	Succeeded by George J. Flynn
Preceded by Jim Mattis	Commanding General of the Marine Corps Combat Development Command; 2006–2008	Succeeded by George J. Flynn
Preceded by Robert Magnus	Assistant Commandant of the Marine Corps; 2008-2010	Succeeded by Joseph Dunford
Preceded by James T. Conway	Commandant of the Marine Corps; 2010–2014	Succeeded by Joseph Dunford
