= KNBC (disambiguation) =

KNBC can refer to:

- KNBC, a TV station in Los Angeles
- KNBR (AM), a San Francisco radio station formerly called KNBC
- the ICAO code for Marine Corps Air Station Beaufort, in Beaufort, South Carolina, United States
