= Kenneth L. Reusser =

US Marine Corps aviator (1920–2009)

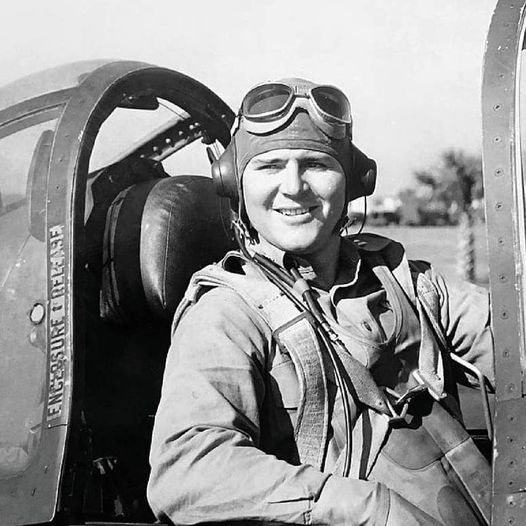
- Born: January 27, 1920; Cloverdale, Oregon, US
- Died: June 20, 2009 (aged 89); Clackamas, Oregon, US
- Burial place: Willamette National Cemetery, Happy Valley, Oregon, US
- Military career
- Allegiance: United States of America
- Branch: United States Marine Corps
- Service years: 1941–1968
- Rank: Colonel
- Units: VMA 214 "Black Sheep" Squadron; VMFA 312 "Checkerboards" Squadron
- Commands: Marine Aircraft Group 16
- Conflicts: World War II; Battle of Okinawa; Korean War; Vietnam War
- Awards: Navy Cross (2); Legion of Merit (2); Distinguished Flying Cross (2); Bronze Star (V Device); Purple Heart (5); Air Medal (18)
- Other work: Lockheed Aircraft; Piasecki Helicopter Corp

Kenneth Lyle Reusser (January 27, 1920 – June 20, 2009) was a United States Marine Corps aviator who was considered the most decorated Marine Aviator, having flown 253 combat missions, earning 59 medals, including two Navy Crosses while flying in World War II, the Korean War, and the Vietnam War. He is the only aviator to survive being shot down in all three wars.

== Early years ==
Reusser was born in 1920, the son of a minister. He enjoyed racing motorcycles, the winnings from which helped him to pay for college and eventually earn a pilot's license just prior to World War II.

== World War II ==
Reusser first saw combat as part of VMF-122, assigned to Guadalcanal flying the F4F Wildcat. While assigned to the squadron, he was forced to ditch his aircraft in the Pacific after an encounter with the enemy. Injured severely, he was rescued by local islanders who nursed him until word could be passed and a recovery made.

Reusser served as a captain in Marine Fighting Squadron 312 (VMF-312), where he earned his first Navy Cross:

- The President of the United States of America takes pleasure in presenting the Navy Cross to Captain Kenneth L. Reusser (MCSN: 0-11066), United States Marine Corps Reserve, for extraordinary heroism and distinguished service in the line of his profession as Division Leader and Pilot of a Fighter Plane in Marine Fighting Squadron THREE HUNDRED TWELVE (VMF-312), Marine Air Group THIRTY-THREE (MAG-33), FOURTH Marine Aircraft Wing, in aerial combat against enemy Japanese forces on Okinawa, Ryukyu Islands, on 10 May 1945. After expending his ammunition on an enemy reconnaissance plane while flying on combat air patrol, Captain Reusser skillfully maneuvered his plane to enable a friendly aircraft to make a close-range attack. When the guns of his wingman failed, he flew with his wingtip obstructing the Japanese pilot's evasionary tactics and, by allowing the wingman the opportunity of running his propeller over the tail surface of the hostile ship, contributed in large measure to the eventual crash of the enemy craft. His superb airmanship, perseverance and courageous devotion to duty were in keeping with the highest traditions of the United States Naval Service.

== Korean War ==
On August 5, 1950, Major Kenneth L. Reusser became the first Marine to be decorated for gallantry during the Korean War when he was awarded a Gold Star in lieu of a second award of the Navy Cross for while serving as Pilot of a Fighter Plane in Marine Fighter Squadron TWO HUNDRED FOURTEEN (VMF-214), attached to the U.S.S. SICILY (CVE-118), during an aerial attack on enemy targets in the Inch'on:

- As Flight Leader of a Combat Air Patrol assigned the mission of seeking targets of opportunity, Major Reusser led his flight in a strafing attack against a hostile factory, destroying several vehicles and 30 of the enemy in a truck despite intense and accurate hostile anti-aircraft fire. Suspecting that the strong defenses protected vehicles of war, he ordered his flight to orbit the target at 3000 feet while he investigated the factory at window-level and, on his second pass made in the face of automatic fire coming from the windows, discovered that the factory was a vehicle and tank assembly plant. With both wings of his plane damaged by anti-aircraft fire, he flew back to the U.S.S. SICILY and returned to the target with napalm and rockets, destroying the plant with napalm and blasting six completed enemy tanks and four trucks in the factory courtyard in spite of accurate anti-aircraft fire. This mission completed, he led his flight into the heavily fortified Inch'on Harbor and destroyed a large oil storage tank. Determined to inflict the greatest possible damage on the enemy even though his heavy ordinance was expended, he dived to within ten feet of a camouflaged oil tanker and raked the hull with his 20-mm guns, causing an explosion which not only destroyed the enemy ship, but also damaged his own craft and blew it out of control. Successful in returning his crippled plane to carrier base, Major Reusser, by his gallant fighting spirit, courage and devotion to duty, upheld the highest traditions of the United States Naval Service.

== Vietnam ==
During the war Reusser served as commanding officer of Marine Aircraft Group 16. While leading a rescue mission, his Huey was shot down. He needed skin grafts over 35 percent of his body.

== Retirement ==
After retiring as a colonel from the Marine Corps, Reusser resided in Milwaukie, Oregon. He worked for Lockheed Aircraft and the Piasecki Helicopter Corp. and was active in veterans' groups. Reusser died on June 20, 2009. He was survived by his first wife, Patricia, and his second wife, Gertrude; and sons, Richard C. and Kenneth L. Jr., and was preceded in death by his daughter Patty Jo.

== Military decorations and awards ==
Reusser received the Navy Cross, the Navy and Marine Corps second highest military award, Twice.

He also received five purple hearts, having been shot down at least once in each of the three wars he flew combat missions in.

Badge	Naval Aviator insignia			
1st row	Navy Cross w/ one gold 5/16 inch star		Legion of Merit w/ Combat "V" and one gold 5/16 inch star	Distinguished Flying Cross and one gold 5/16 inch star
2nd row	Bronze Star Medal w/ Combat "V"	Purple Heart Medal w/ 4 gold 5/16 inch stars	Air Medal w/ 3 silver 5/16 inch stars and two gold 5/16 inch stars	Navy and Marine Corps Commendation Medal w/ one gold 5/16 inch stars
3rd row	Marine Corps Expeditionary Medal	American Defense Service Medal	American Campaign Medal	Asiatic-Pacific Campaign Medal
4th row	World War II Victory Medal	Navy Occupation Service Medal	National Defense Service Medal w/ one bronze service star	Korean Service Medal
5th row	Armed Forces Expeditionary Medal	Vietnam Service Medal	United Nations Korea Medal	Vietnam Campaign Medal
