= Marine Aviation Logistics Squadron 31 =

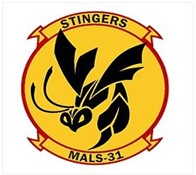
- MALS-31 Insignia
- Active: 1 February 1943 – present
- Country: United States
- Branch: United States Marine Corps
- Type: Logistics
- Role: Aviation logistics support
- Part of: Marine Aircraft Group 31; 2nd Marine Aircraft Wing
- Garrison/HQ: Marine Corps Air Station Beaufort
- Nickname(s): Stingers
- Engagements: World War II; Battle of Okinawa; Operation Desert Storm; Operation Enduring Freedom; Operation Iraqi Freedom

Commanders
- Current commander: LtCol Jon D. Stiebner

Marine Aviation Logistics Squadron 31 (MALS-31) is an aviation logistics support unit of the United States Marine Corps. Known as the "Stingers", they fall under the command of Marine Aircraft Group 31 (MAG-31) and 2nd Marine Aircraft Wing (2nd MAW) and are currently based at Marine Corps Air Station Beaufort.

== Mission ==
Provide aviation logistics support, guidance, planning, and direction to Marine Aircraft Group squadrons on behalf of the commanding officer, as well as logistics support for Navy funded equipment in the supporting Marine Wing Support Squadron (MWSS), Marine Air Control Group (MACG), and Marine Aircraft Wing/Mobile Calibration Complex (MAW/MCC).

== History ==
=== World War II ===
Headquarters Squadron 31 (HQSQ-31) was activated on 1 February 1943 at Marine Corps Air Station Cherry Point, North Carolina, as an element of the 3rd Marine Aircraft Wing, Fleet Marine Force. Six month later, Headquarters Squadron 31 as part of MAG-31, was en route to Miramar, California, finally departing the United States from San Diego, California, embarked on board the USS Nassau and USAT Puebla.

On 10 November 1944, the 4th Marine Bases Defense Air Wing, was redesignated to the 4th Marine Aircraft Wing. On 11 March 1945, MAG-31, became part of the 2nd MAW. Headquarters Squadron 31 and other MAG-31 elements began moving from Roi-Namur Island, sailing for the most active front at that time-the Battle of Okinawa. Ground personnel of MAG-31 went ashore on Okinawa on 3 April 1945 to prepare to support MAG-31, which landed from the USS Sitkoh Bay and began operations four days later. En route from the carrier to shore, two MAG-31 pilots shot down a Japanese bomber making a suicide run on their CVE, and gave MAG-31 the distinction of having the first land based aircraft to make a kill in the Okinawa campaign.

=== 1950s ===
In the midst of the Korean War, MAG-31 was reactivated on 17 March 1952, with its subordinate elements, at Marine Corps Air Station, Cherry Point, NC, but its location was shortly changed when it moved to Marine Corps Air Station Miami, Florida. A major redesignation occurred on 15 February 1954, as the squadron became Headquarters and Maintenance Squadron 31 (H&MS-31). Marine Aircraft Maintenance Squadron 31 was disbanded and its personnel transferred to Headquarters and Maintenance Squadron 31. Headquarters and Maintenance Squadron 31 was redesignated on 22 August 1958 to become part of the 2nd Marine Aircraft Wing. The squadron along with the group was reduced to a paper organization as it moved to Cherry Point with a small complement of personnel. On 31 January 1959, MAG-31 and its squadron were deactivated at Cherry Point.

=== 1960s – present ===
In October 1988, Headquarters and Maintenance Squadron 31 was redesignated Marine Aviation Logistics Squadron 31 (MALS-31) and transferred its A-4 Skyhawk aircraft to Davis Monthan Air Force Base, Arizona. MALS-31 successfully completed the transformation of its aviation logistics support mission from F-4 Phantom IIs to the F/A-18 Hornet in 1990. Since then, Marine Aviation Logistics Squadron 31 has participated in numerous unit deployments, carrier detachments, as well as: Operation Desert Storm, Operation Deny Flight, Operation Noble Anvil. MALS-31 participated in and supported both Operation Enduring Freedom and Operation Iraqi Freedom.

== See also ==
- United States Marine Corps Aviation
- Organization of the United States Marine Corps
- List of United States Marine Corps aviation support units
