= VMFT-402 =

Marine Fighter Training Squadron 402
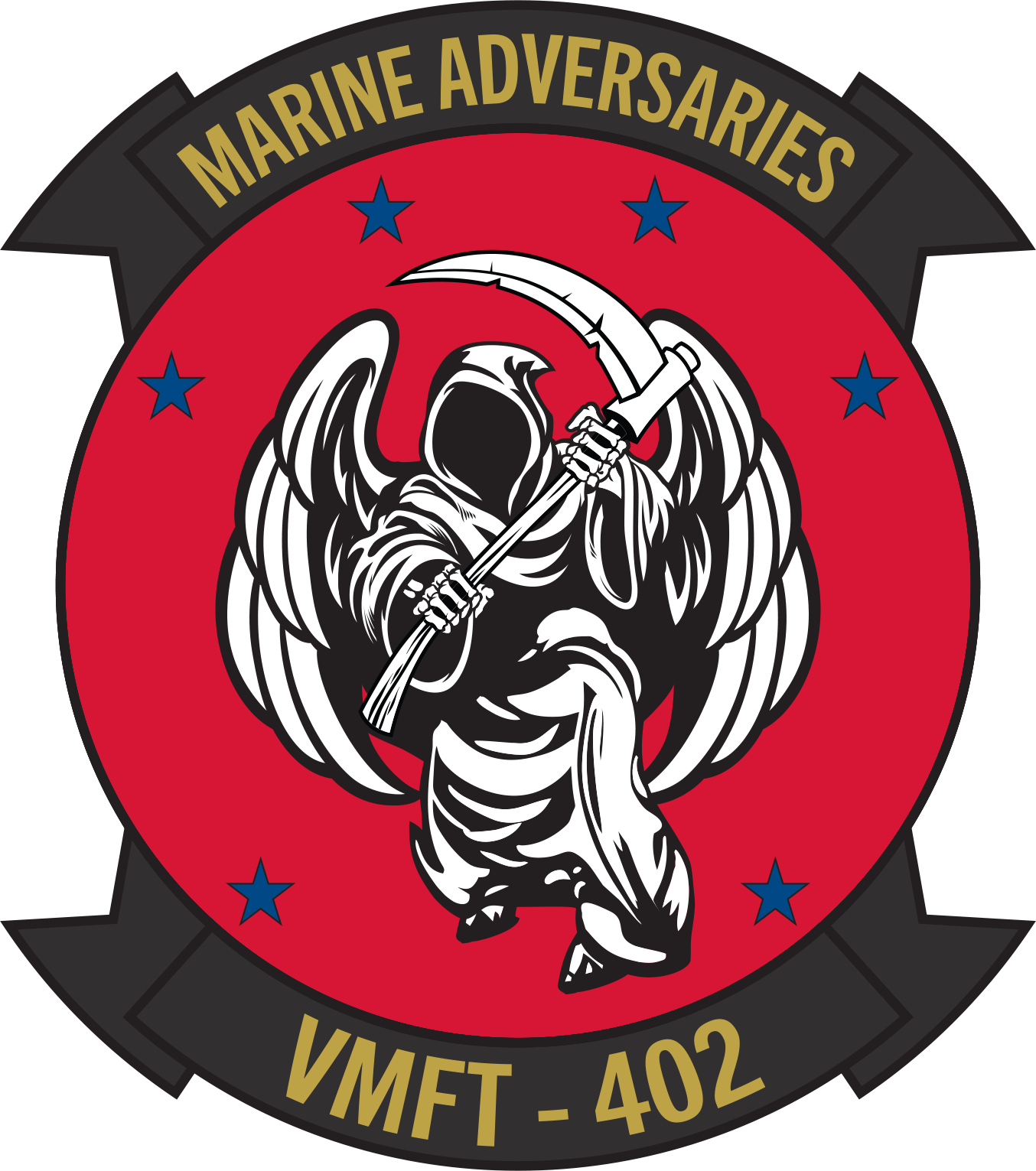
- Active: June 30, 1969 - May 1, 1972 September 2024- present
- Country: United States
- Branch: United States Marine Corps
- Type: Adversary Squadron
- Part of: United States Marine Corps Reserve: 4th Marine Aircraft Wing; Marine Aircraft Group 41
- Garrison/HQ: Marine Corps Air Station Beaufort, South Carolina
- Nickname(s): "Grim Reapers"
- Tail Code: HQ

Aircraft flown
- Fighter: F-5N Tiger II

Marine Fighter Training Squadron 402 (VMFT-402) is an adversary squadron of the United States Marine Corps Reserve, flying the F-5N Tiger II. Known as the "Grim Reapers," the squadron is one of two adversary squadrons in the Marine Corps. The squadron is based at Marine Corps Air Station Beaufort, South Carolina and falls under the command of the 4th Marine Aircraft Wing and Marine Aircraft Group 41. VMFT-402 is a non-deployable unit.

== Mission ==
Provide instruction to active and reserve Fleet Marine Forces and Fleet squadrons through dissimilar air combat training (DACT).

== History ==
=== Early years ===
Marine Medium Helicopter Training Squadron 402 (HMMT-402) was commissioned on June 30, 1969, at Marine Corps Air Station New River, North Carolina. The squadron was responsible for training pilots and aircrew to fly the Boeing Vertol CH-46 Sea Knight. HMMT-402 was decommissioned on May 1, 1972.

=== Reactivation as an aggressor squadron ===
On May 30, 2024, three Northrop F-5N Tiger IIs arrived at MCAS Beaufort, SC as the squadron began the process of standing up as the Marine Corps’ second aggressor squadron. The unit's primary mission when commissioned will be to replicate adversary formations and tactics in order to help train east coast-based squadrons from both the 2d and 4th Marine Aircraft Wings.

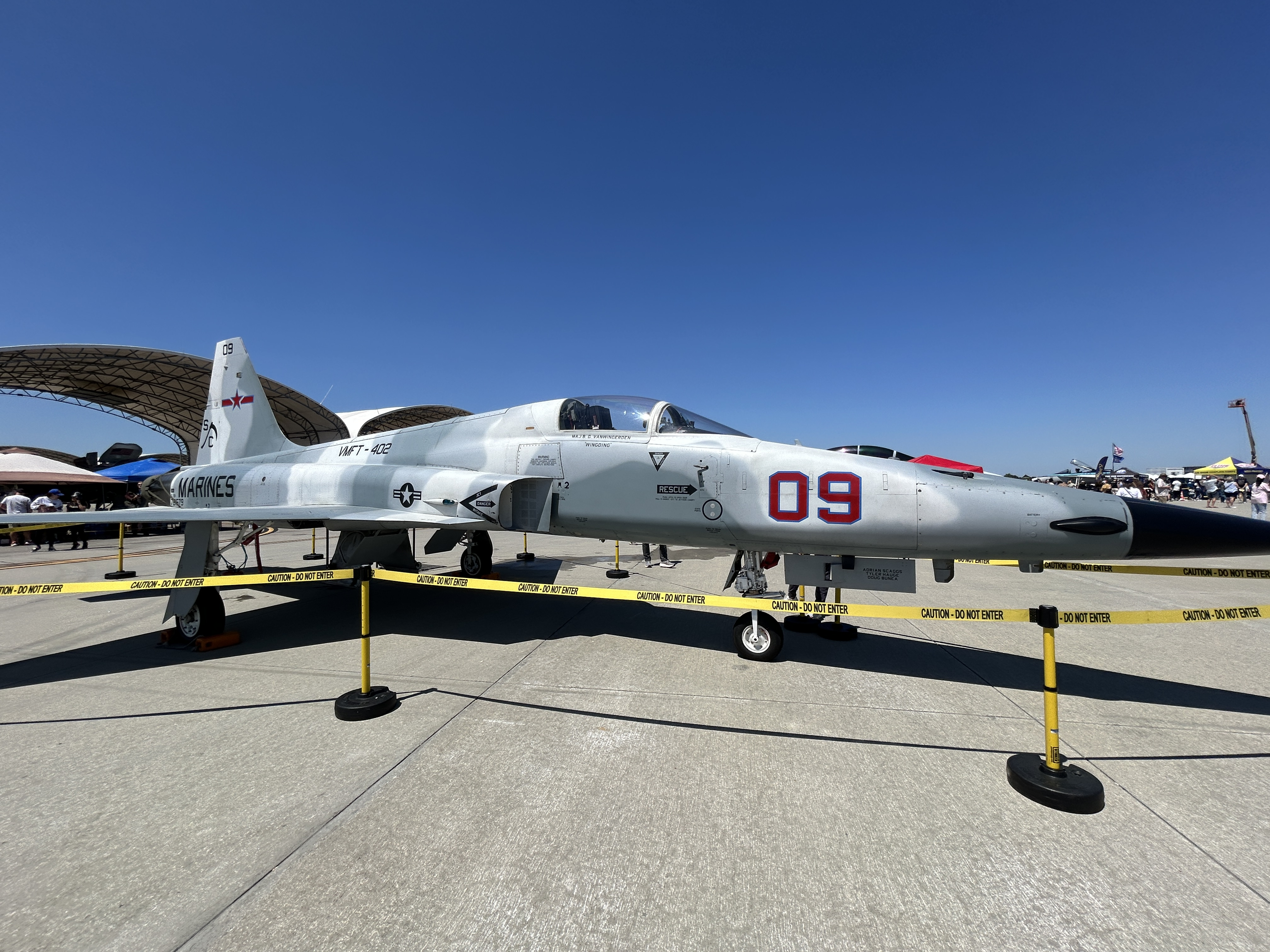
F-5N of USMC VMFT-402

== See also ==
- List of active United States Marine Corps aircraft squadrons
- United States Marine Corps Aviation
