= VMFA-224 =

Marine Fighter Attack Squadron 224
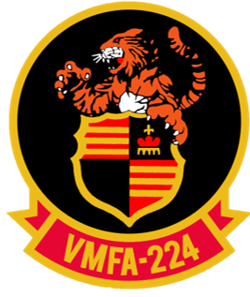
- Active: 1 May 1942 - present
- Country: United States of America
- Branch: United States Marine Corps
- Type: Fighter/Attack
- Role: Close air support Air interdiction Aerial reconnaissance
- Part of: Marine Aircraft Group 31; 2nd Marine Aircraft Wing
- Garrison/HQ: Marine Corps Air Station Beaufort
- Nicknames: "Fighting Bengals"; Fighting Wildcats (WWII)
- Tail Code: WK
- Engagements: World War II * Battle of Guadalcanal * Battle of Okinawa; Vietnam War; Operation Desert Storm; Operation Joint Endeavor; Operation Iraqi Freedom; Operation Inherent Resolve

Commanders
- Commanding Officer: LtCol J. Stuart
- Executive Officer: Capt Josh "Hot Rod" Stringer
- Senior Enlisted Leader: SgtMaj S. Buckom

Aircraft flown
- Attack: Douglas A4D Skyhawk; Grumman A-6 Intruder
- Fighter: Grumman F4F Wildcat; Vought F4U Corsair; McDonnell F2H-2 Banshee; Grumman F9F Panther; McDonnell-Douglas F/A-18D Hornet; Lockheed Martin F-35B Lightning II

Marine Fighter Attack Squadron 224 (VMFA-224) is a United States Marine Corps (USMC) F-35B Lightning II squadron. Also known as the "Fighting Bengals", the squadron is based at Marine Corps Air Station Beaufort, South Carolina and falls under the command of Marine Aircraft Group 31 (MAG-31) and the 2nd Marine Aircraft Wing (2nd MAW). The Bengals started their transition to the F-35B Lightning II in the summer of 2025.

== Mission ==
Support the Marine Air–Ground Task Force commander by providing supporting arms coordination, conducting multi-sensor imagery, and destroying surface targets and enemy aircraft day or night; under all weather conditions during expeditionary, joint, or combined operations.

== History ==
=== World War II ===
Marine Fighter Squadron 224 (VMF-224) was commissioned on 1 May 1942 at Marine Corps Air Station Ewa Hawaii. During this time the squadron flew both Brewster F2A Buffalos and Grumman F4F Wildcats out of Naval Air Station Barbers Point. In the spring, a ten-plane detachment from the squadron was sent to Barking Sands at the northern tip of Kauai to patrol against possible Japanese raids. On 14 August 1942, the planes and pilots of VMF-224 departed Hawaii on board the USS Kitty Hawk (AKV-1). VMF-224 was part of the 2nd echelon of Marine Aircraft Group 23 to depart Hawaii. The Kitty Hawk arrived at Port Vila, Efate, New Hebrides on 28 August. The ship moored alongside the escort carrier Long Island and transferred 40 aircraft. VMF-224 aircraft catapulted from the Long Island on 30 August 1942 arriving at Henderson Field, Guadalcanal in the middle of a Japanese air raid. The squadron saw its first combat on 2 September, when it assisted with intercepting a 40 plane raid. During this engagement, the squadron commanding officer, Maj Robert Galer, was credited with destroying two Japanese aircraft. The squadron was credited with destroying 60.5 Japanese aircraft in less than two months. The squadron also conducted close air support (CAS) missions while under constant attack from Japanese naval, air, and ground forces. VMF-224 contributed significantly to the American victory during the Guadalcanal Campaign, which in turn, helped stem the tide of the Japanese advance across the Southern Pacific and secured a crucial foothold in the long island-hopping campaign against Japan.

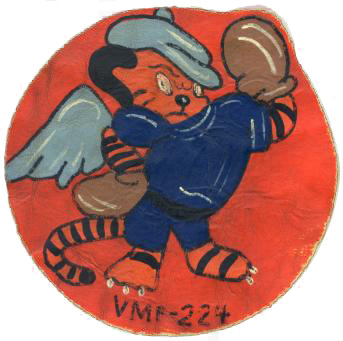
Squadron Patch from WWII

After Guadalcanal, the squadron was refitted with the Vought F4U Corsair and participated in the Marshall Islands Campaign. The spring of 1945 found VMF-224 participating in the last great battle of the Pacific Campaign. During the Battle of Okinawa the squadron operated initially from Yomitan and then from 1 July from Chimu Airfield. Throughout the struggle for Okinawa, the Bengals flew infantry support and counter air missions accounting for an additional fifty-five enemy aircraft being destroyed.

=== 1950s - 1970s ===
The squadron entered the jet era in 1951 with the acceptance of the McDonnell F2H-2 Banshee. In 1952, after completing a Mediterranean Cruise aboard the USS Roosevelt, the squadron accepted the Grumman F9F Panther, and was re-designated Marine Attack Squadron 224 (VMA-224).

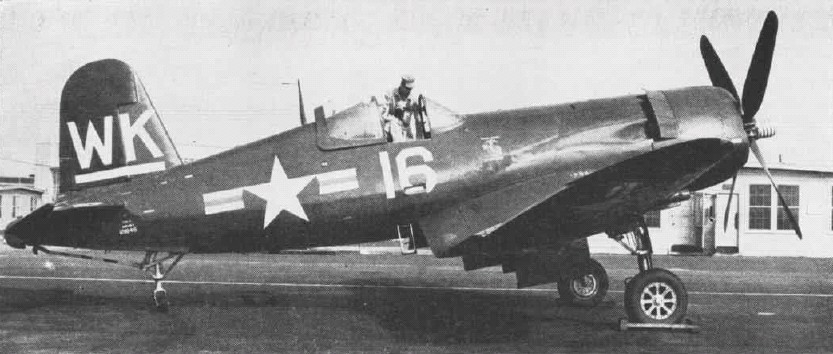
A newly delivered Vought F4U-5 Corsair at MCAS Cherry Point in 1948

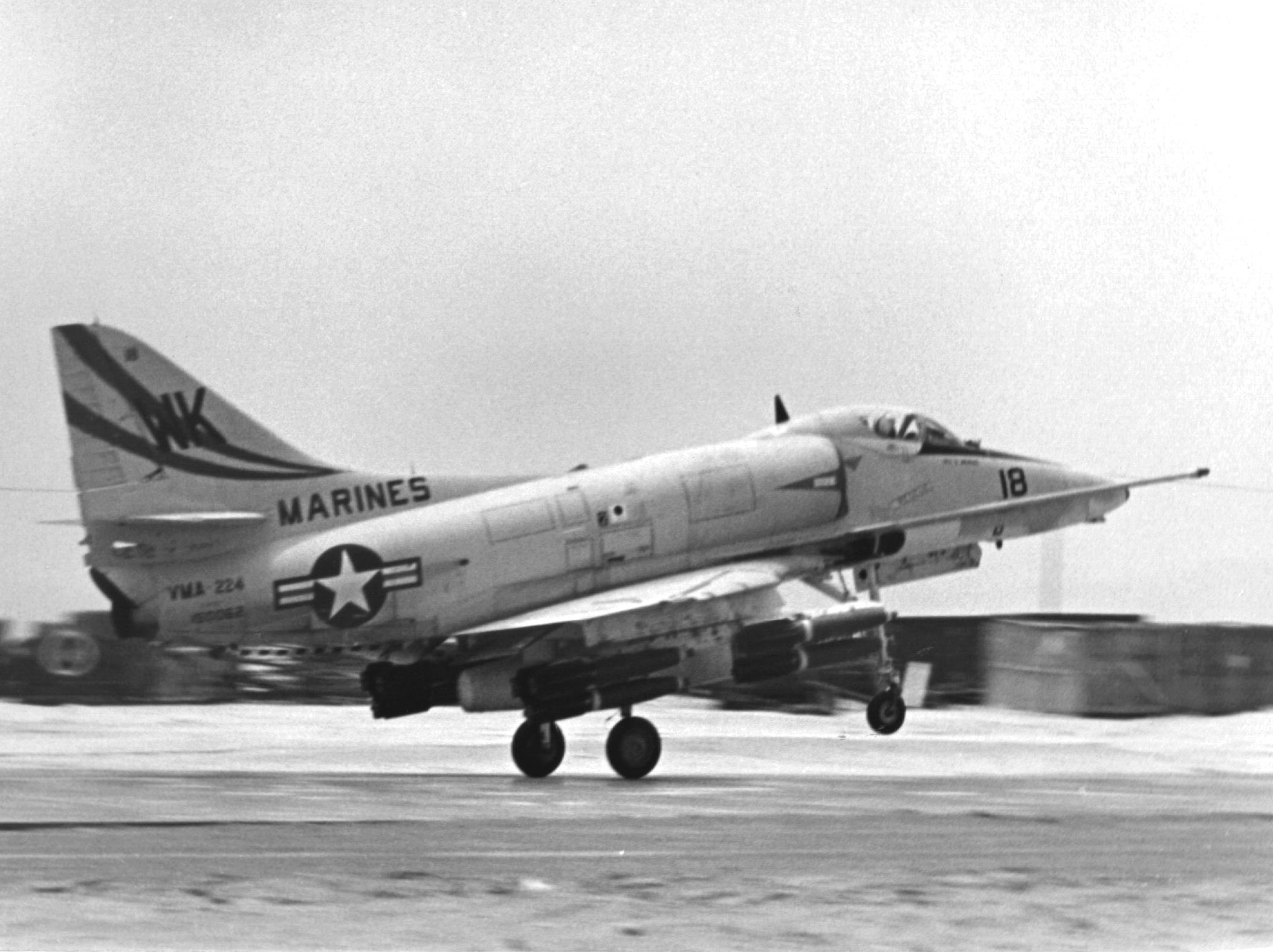
A VMA-224 A-4E takes off from Chu Lai, Vietnam, 24 September 1966.

On 29 September 1956, the squadron became the first Marine unit to field the Douglas A4D Skyhawk aircraft. In 1965, the Bengals deployed to South Vietnam as part of the United States' buildup during the Vietnam War. For nearly a year the Bengals operated their "Scooters" from the expeditionary field at Chu Lai. In October 1966, VMA-224 was disbanded at Chu Lai and the squadron flag was sent to MCAS Cherry Point as it prepared for new personnel and equipment during its transition to a new airframe. On 1 November 1966, the squadron acquired the Grumman A-6 Intruder and was re-designated as Marine All Weather Attack Squadron 224 (VMA(AW)-224). In 1971, the Bengals deployed to the South China Sea aboard the USS Coral Sea (CV-43). As part of Carrier Air Wing 15, the squadron completed six line periods on Yankee Station and participated in numerous operations including the historic Operation Pocket Money mining of Hai Phong Harbor.

=== The Gulf War & the 1990s ===
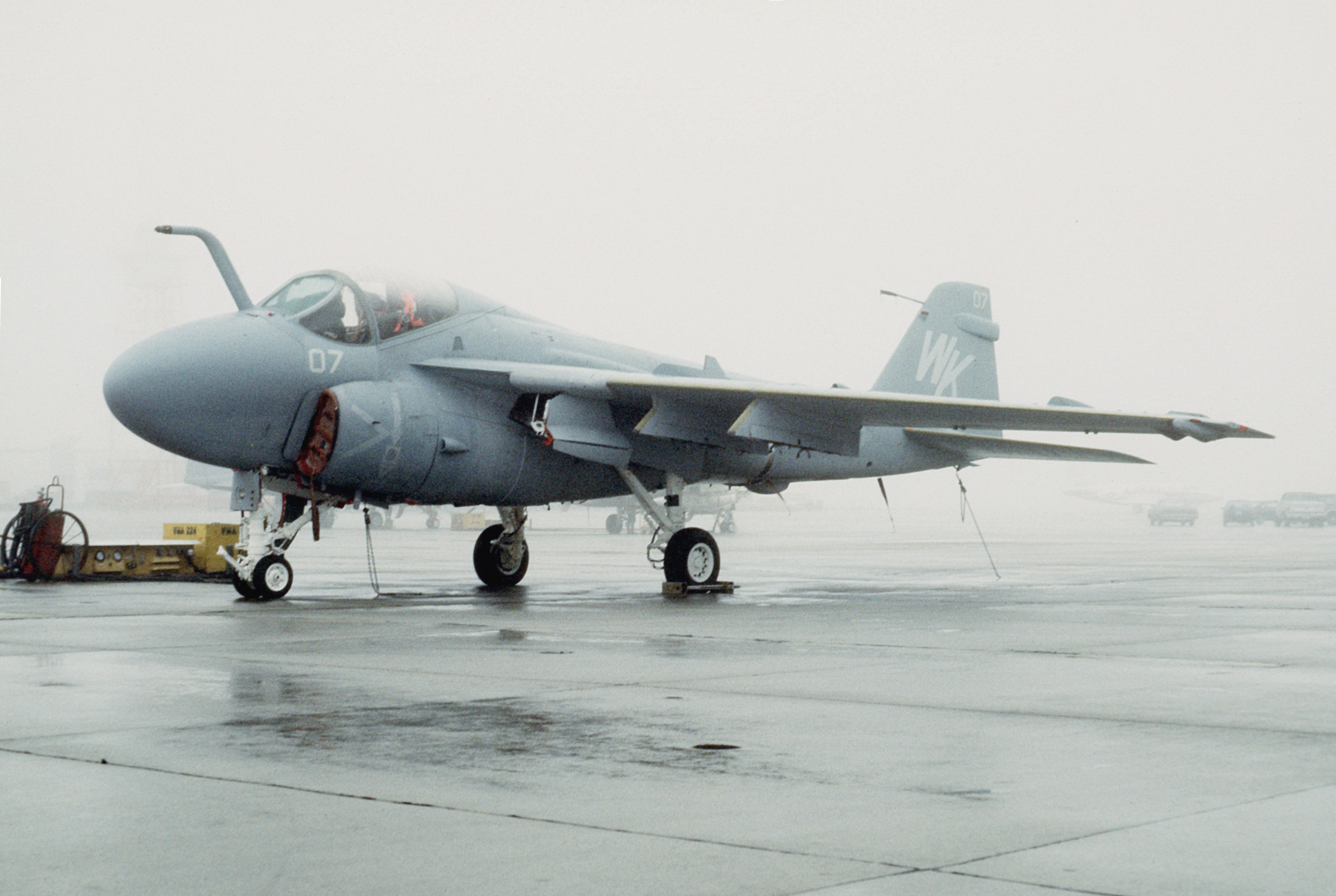
Grumman A-6 Intruder from VMA(AW)-224 on the flightline at MCAS Cherry Point in 1984.

The Bengals deployed to Southwest Asia, on 28 August 1990. Operating from Shaikh-Isa Air Base, Bahrain the squadron participated in Operation Desert Shield. From 16 January, to 28 February 1991, the Bengals participated in Operation Desert Storm, expending more than 2.3 million pounds of ordnance during 422 combat sorties.

Shortly after their return to MCAS Cherry Point, North Carolina, on 24 May 1992, the Bengals celebrated their 50th anniversary. Less than a year later on 5 March 1993, the squadron was re-designated VMFA(AW)-224 and moved to MCAS Beaufort, South Carolina where the Bengals received the multi-mission F/A-18D Hornet.

From April to September 1994 the Bengals deployed to Aviano Air Base, Italy, as part of the United Nations force for Operation Deny Flight and Operation Provide Promise in Bosnia-Herzegovina. The squadron flew 1150 sorties for 3485 flight hours including 1150 night hours. The Marines of VMFA(AW)-224 again deployed to Aviano in September 1995, as part of NATO Operation Deliberate Force and Operation Joint Endeavor.

=== Global War on Terrorism & the 2000s ===
July 2001 brought yet another UDP to Japan, this time with the Advanced Tactical Airborne Reconnaissance System (ATARS), marking the return of the Corps' organic tactical reconnaissance to the Pacific theater after an absence of over a decade. For a majority of this deployment, the squadron was split into two detachments. The detachments flew in support of both the 31st Marine Expeditionary Unit and 15th MEU, conducted ATARS reconnaissance missions, normal squadron training, and other such operations as deemed necessary by 1 MAW and MAG-12. During the course of the UDP, the Bengals operated out of Guam, Okinawa, Australia, Trukk Island, Papua New Guinea, the Philippine Islands, South Korea and mainland Japan.

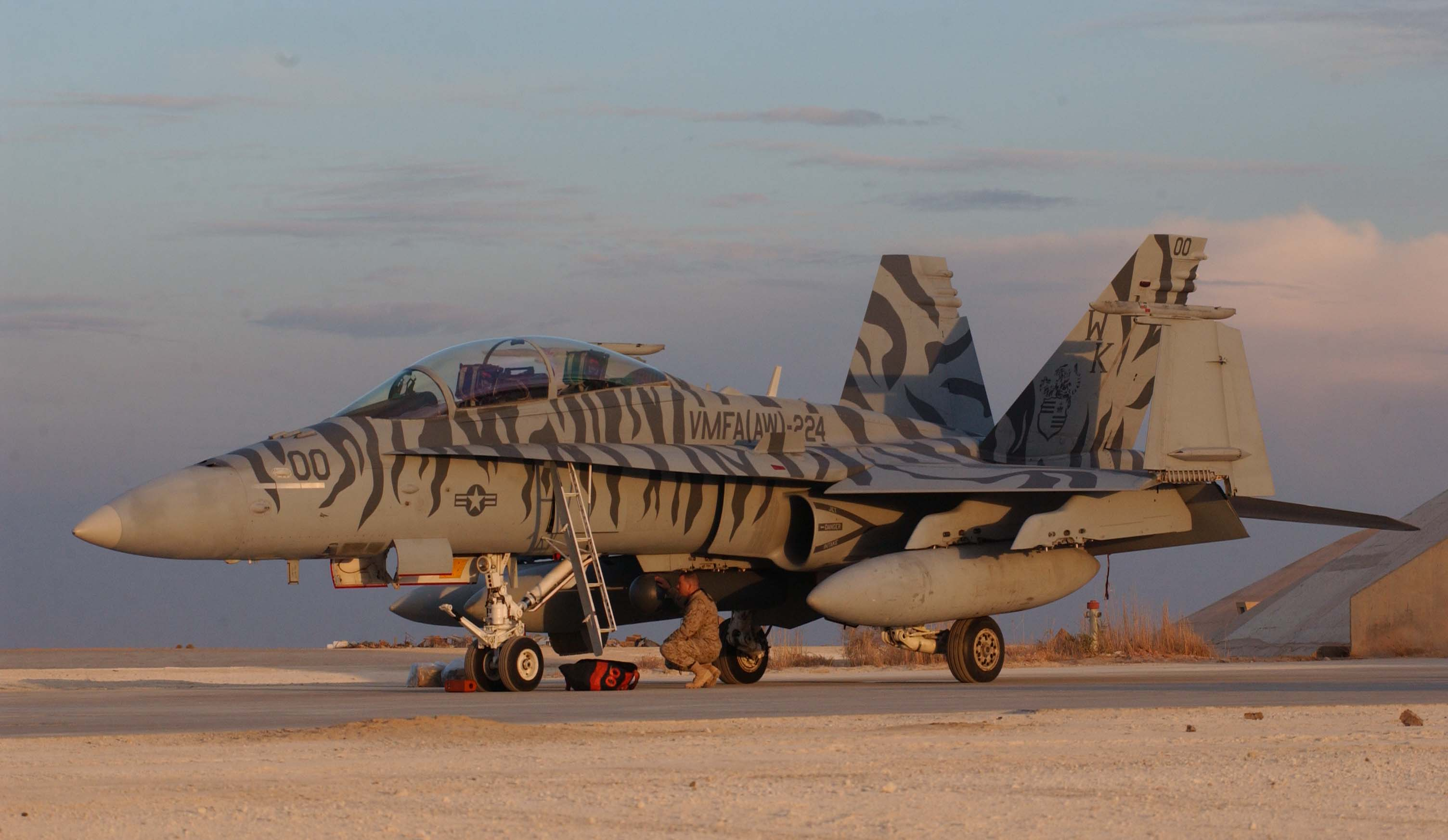
A tigerstripe-painted F/A-18D of VMFA(AW)-224 at Al Asad.

On 11 January 2005, VMFA(AW)-224 deployed to Al Asad Airbase, Iraq in support of Operation Iraqi Freedom (OIF). While in support of OIF, the Bengals participated in Operations RIVER BLITZ, MATADOR, RAGING BULL, BARTER TOWN, NEW MARKET, SPEAR, DAGGER, SWORD and SCIMITAR in support of Regimental Combat Team 2, Regimental Combat Team 8, 3rd Battalion 25th Marines, 2nd Brigade Combat Team and many other Army and Air Force units. Furthermore, the Bengals employed 65,225 lbs. of ordnance and flew over 2500 sorties and 7000 hours in direct support of USMC, U.S. Army and Coalition ground units.

In March 2007, the squadron deployed to Iwakuni, Japan for another UDP. The Bengals participated in various exercises including Foal Eagle, Cobra Gold, and Commando Sling, while executing a wide variety of missions such as ATARS reconnaissance missions, air-to-air training against dissimilar adversaries, Close Air Support (CAS), Forward Air Controller Airborne (FACA), and live air-to-ground ordnance delivery. Additionally, the squadron trained four new Air Combat Tactics Instructors (ACTIs).

The Bengals began 2009 with a Unit Deployment to MCAS Iwakuni, Japan. From January to June, the squadron supported various exercises in Japan, Thailand, Singapore, Korea, and Alaska. Bengal aircrew were able to train with their allied counterparts in various areas to include: FAC(A), Maritime Interdiction and Dissimilar Air Combat Training.

=== 2020-Present ===
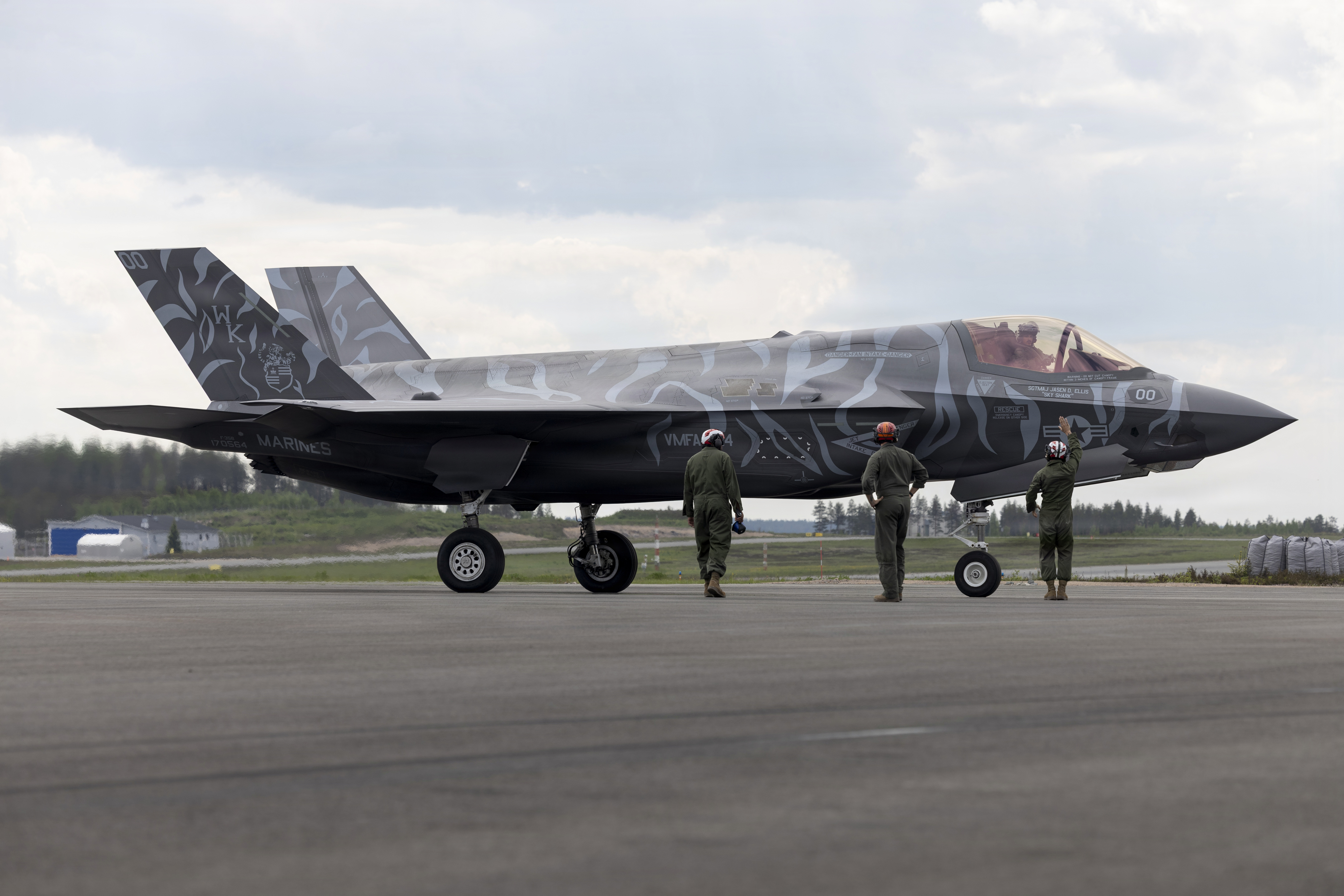
VMFA-224 F-35B Lightning II at Rovaniemi Air Base, Finland in 2026

On 7 May 2021, VMFA(AW)-224 deployed to Prince Sultan Air Base, Saudi Arabia for Dynamic Force Employment (DFE) in support of withdrawal of U.S. troops from Afghanistan and Operation Inherent Resolve.

On 18 March 2024, VMFA(AW)-224 deployed to Marine Corps Air Station Iwakuni in support of the Unit Deployment Program (UDP). While in support of UDP, the squadron participated in Exercise Valiant Shield at Andersen Air Force Base from May–June 2024. Immediately following, the squadron participated in a bi-lateral exercise to Suwon Air Base, South Korea from July–August 2024. The Fighting Bengals were the final USMC All-Weather designated F/A-18 squadron to deploy.

=== Accidents ===
On 12 March 2010 an F/A-18D Hornet from the squadron crashed 35 miles (56 km) off the coast of Saint Helena Sound north of Beaufort due to an engine fire. The pilot and Weapons Systems Officer were able to safely eject.

On 22 February 2015 an F/A-18D crashed in wooded and swampy terrain, near Statenville, Georgia, while conducting low-altitude tactics training. Both the pilot and weapon systems officer were able to safely eject and were treated for minor injuries.

On 24 August 2023 an F/A-18D crashed in the vicinity of Marine Corps Air Station Miramar at 11:54 p.m. PST. Search and rescue recovered the U.S. Marine Corps pilot who was confirmed deceased at the site. The pilot was the only person aboard the aircraft.

=== 2025 F/A-18 Retirement, redesignation, and transition ===
On April 28, 2025, VMFA(AW)-224 completed its final flight in the F/A-18 and began transitioning to the 5th generation F-35B Lightning. On June 27, 2025, VMFA(AW)-224 was redesignated to VMFA-224 at MCAS Beaufort. The event marked the squadron's historic transition from operating the F/A-18D Hornet to becoming an F-35B Lightning II Joint Strike Fighter squadron, concluding more than 32 years as a Hornet squadron and as a Marine all-weather fighter attack squadron.

== See also ==
- United States Marine Corps Aviation
- List of active United States Marine Corps aircraft squadrons
- List of decommissioned United States Marine Corps aircraft squadrons
