= Marine Corps Air Station Beaufort =

US Marine Corps base in Beaufort, South Carolina, United States

- Merritt Field
- Near Beaufort, South Carolina in the United States
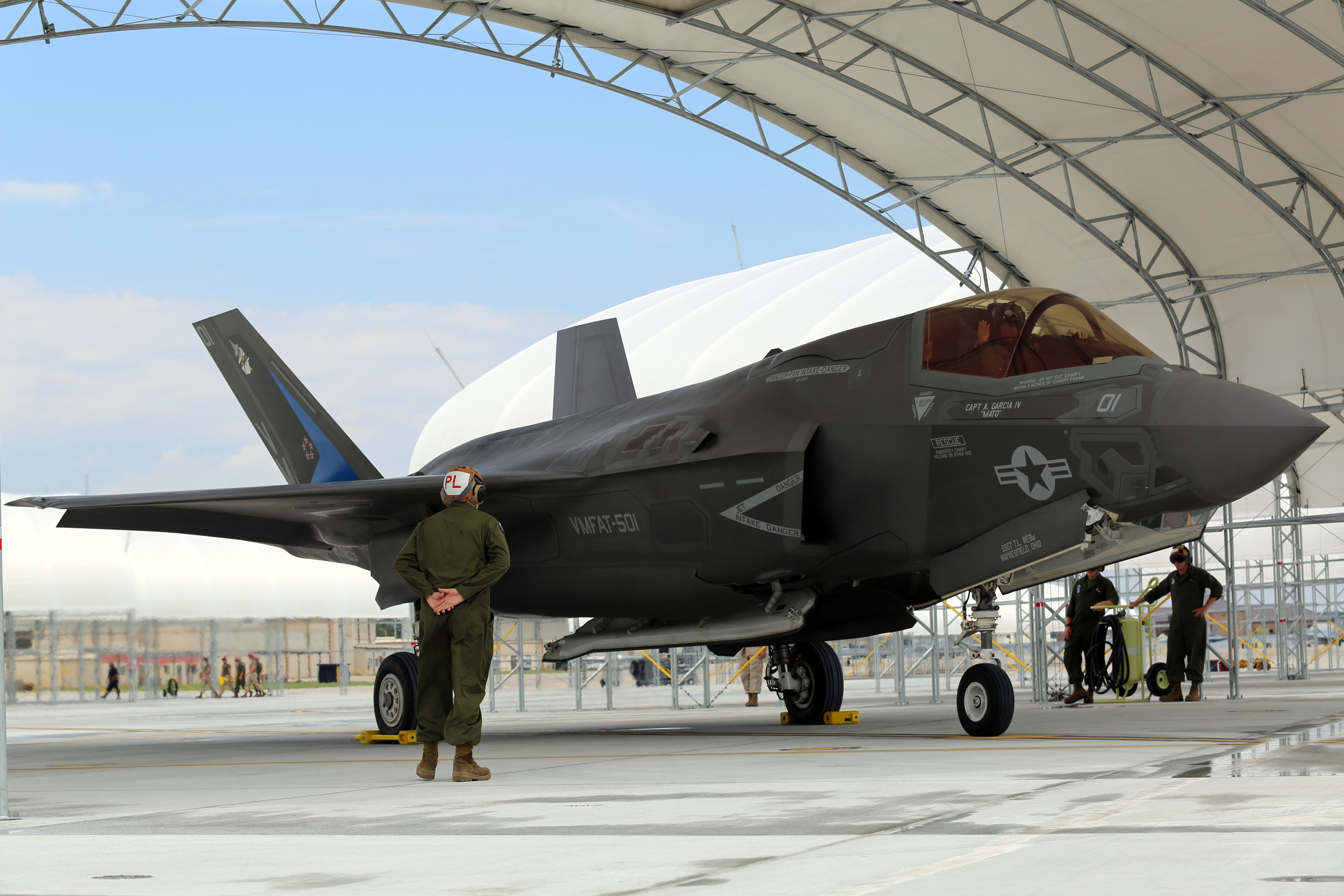
- A US Marine Corps F-35B Lighting II of VMFAT-501 at MCAS Beaufort

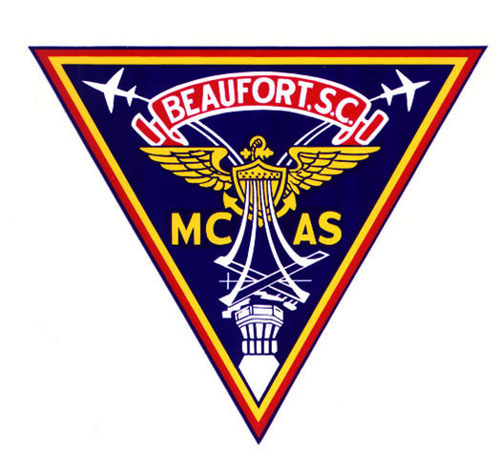

Site information
- Type: Marine Corps air station
- Owner: Department of Defense
- Operator: US Marine Corps
- Controlled by: 2nd Marine Aircraft Wing
- Open to the public: No
- Condition: Operational
- Website: www.beaufort.marines.mil

Location
- Location in the United States
- Coordinates: 32°28′38″N 080°43′23″W

Site history
- Built: 1943 (as Naval Air Station Beaufort)
- In use: 1943 – 1946 and 1956 – 1960 (USN); 1960 – present (USMC)

Garrison information
- Current commander: Colonel Trevor J. Felter
- Garrison: Marine Aircraft Group 31

Airfield information
- Identifiers: ICAO: KNBC, FAA LID: NBC, WMO: 722085
- Elevation: 11.2 metres (37 ft) AMSL
Runways
Direction	Length and surface
05/23	3,719.1 metres (12,202 ft) porous European mix
14/32	2,438.7 metres (8,001 ft) porous European mix
- Other airfield facilities: 5x V/STOL pads and 1x simulated landing helicopter dock

Marine Corps Air Station Beaufort or MCAS Beaufort (ICAO: KNBC, FAA LID: NBC) is a United States Marine Corps (USMC) air base located 5 kilometers (3.1 mi) northwest of the central business district of Beaufort, a city in Beaufort County, South Carolina, United States. About 4,700 personnel serve at the station, and it is home to three Marine Corps F-35B Lighting II squadrons, one F/A-18 Hornet fighter-attack squadron and one F-5N Tiger II squadron.

Beaufort is served by the Beaufort County Airport (IATA: BFT, ICAO: KARW, FAA LID: ARW), located 10 kilometers (6.2 mi) southeast of MCAS Beaufort.

== History ==
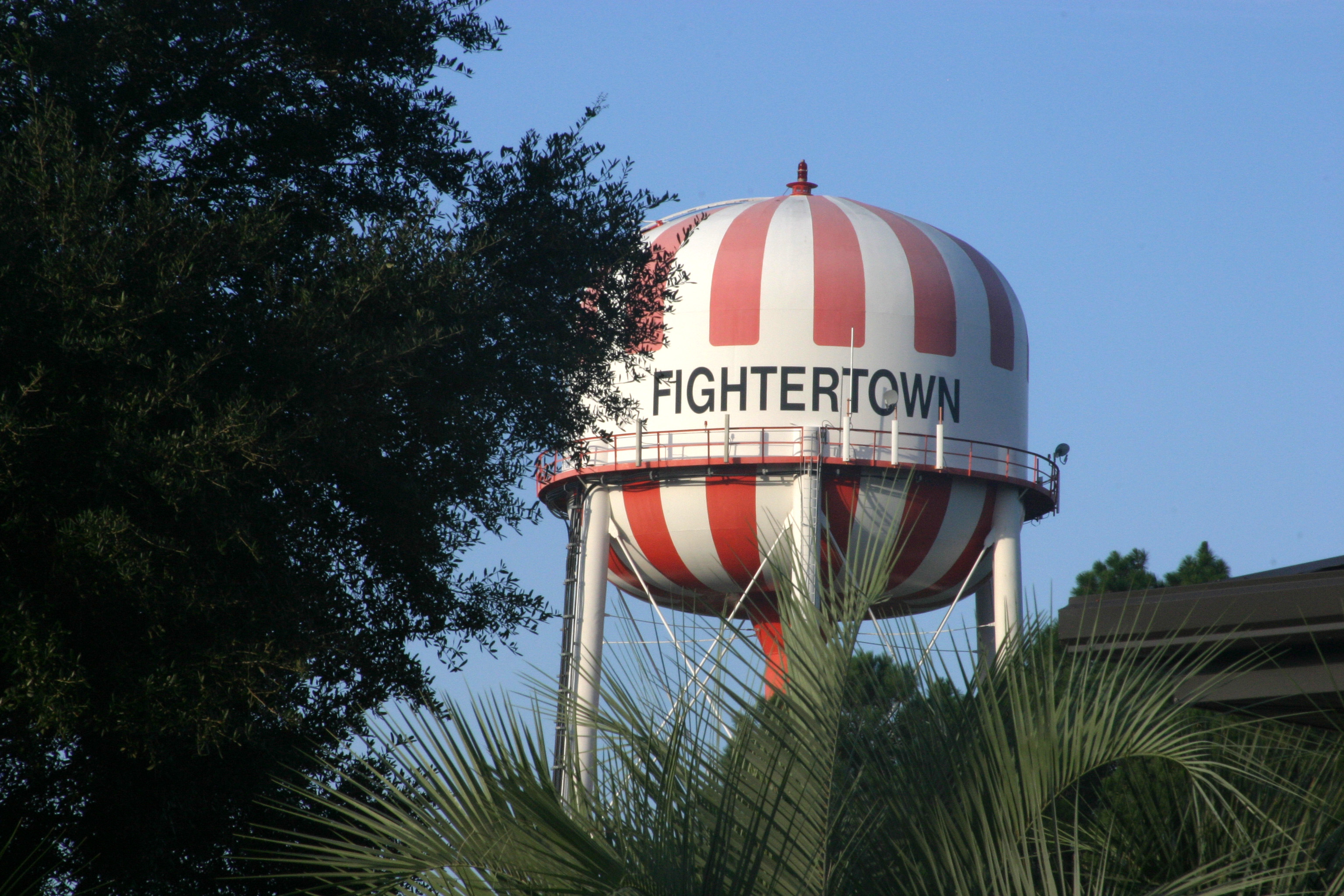
The water tower on the air station, emblazoned with the base nickname "Fightertown"

Naval Air Station Beaufort was commissioned on 15 June 1943, for advanced training operations of anti-submarine patrols during World War II. It was deactivated in 1946 and reactivated in 1956.

On 1 March 1960, it was re-designated Marine Corps Air Station Beaufort.

On 19 September 1975, the airfield was named Merritt Field in honor of Major General Lewie G. Merritt, USMC, a 1917 graduate of The Citadel, The Military College of South Carolina. A native of Ridge Spring, Merritt was a Marine Aviation pioneer who served in both World Wars and commanded several major flying units in the South Pacific during World War II, after retirement he also served as legal counsel to the South Carolina Legislature.

The air station encompasses 6,900 acres (28 km^{2}). It is also associated with a large air-to-air combat area off the coast of South Carolina and Georgia as well as the Townsend Bombing Range, a 5,200 acre (21 km^{2}) air-to-ground combat and bombing range in McIntosh County, Georgia. Attached to the base is also the housing complex of Laurel Bay, three miles (5 km) from the station, that provides family housing for area servicemembers.

Formerly home to USMC F-8 Crusader and F-4 Phantom II operations, MCAS Beaufort currently hosts all active duty USMC F/A-18 air operations on the East Coast, said aircraft and squadrons being assigned to Marine Aircraft Group 31 (MAG-31). The mission of MCAS Beaufort is to provide support as an operational base for MAG-31 and its associated squadrons, Marine Corps support units and tenant U.S. Navy strike fighter squadrons. The mission of the Marine Aircraft Group is to conduct anti-air-warfare and offensive air support operations in support of Fleet Marine Forces from advanced bases, expeditionary airfields, or aircraft carriers and conduct such other air operations as may be directed. Two Navy F/A-18 strike fighter squadrons under the claimancy of Strike Fighter Wing Atlantic at NAS Oceana, Virginia were also previously homeported at MCAS Beaufort. The population of the on-base "city" includes nearly 4,000 active-duty servicemembers and more than 700 civilian workers.

As is the case with many air bases, MCAS Beaufort hosts a bi-annual air show open to the public. In April 2007, a fatal crash occurred involving an aircraft from the Blue Angels demonstration team during the show.

MCAS Beaufort's nickname is "Fightertown East". MCAS Miramar in San Diego, California is the more commonly known "Fightertown", also called "Fightertown USA", the latter having acquired the nickname when it was under Navy control as NAS Miramar.

MCAS Beaufort's Dental Clinic shares a building with the Medical Clinic. The Dental Clinic has five to seven dentists who support the squadrons' oral health care needs.

The 1979 film The Great Santini, based on a novel written by Pat Conroy which centered on MCAS Beaufort in the early 1960s, was filmed on base and in the local area.

== Tenant Squadrons ==
Flying units based at MCAS Beaufort

Insignia	Squadron	Code	Callsign/Nickname	Assigned Aircraft	Operational Assignment
	Marine Fighter Attack Squadron 224	VMFA-224	Bengals	F-35B Lightning II	2nd Marine Aircraft Wing
	Marine Fighter Attack Squadron 533	VMFA-533	Hawks	F-35B Lightning II	2nd Marine Aircraft Wing
	Marine Fighter Attack Squadron 312	VMFA-312	Checkerboards	F/A-18C Hornet	2nd Marine Aircraft Wing
	Marine Fighter Attack Training Squadron 501	VMFAT-501	Warlords	F-35B Lightning II	2nd Marine Aircraft Wing
	Marine Fighter Training Squadron 402	VMFT-402	Grim Reapers	F-5N Tiger II	4th Marine Aircraft Wing

== Based units ==
Flying and notable non-flying units based at MCAS Beaufort.

=== United States Marine Corps ===
Marine Corps Installations – East

- Headquarters and Headquarters Squadron – UC-12M Huron

2nd Marine Aircraft Wing

- Marine Air Control Group 28
  - Marine Air Control Squadron 2 (MACS-2) (Air Defense Company Bravo and Kilo Company)
- Marine Aircraft Group 31
  - Marine Fighter Attack Squadron 224 (VMFA-224) – F-35B Lightning II
  - Marine Fighter Attack Squadron 533 (VMFA-533) – F-35B Lightning II
  - Marine Aviation Logistics Squadron 31 (MALS-31)
  - Marine Fighter Attack Squadron 115 (VMFA-115) – F/A-18A/C Hornet
  - Marine Fighter Attack Squadron 312 (VMFA-312) – F/A-18C/D Hornet
  - Marine Fighter Attack Training Squadron 501 (VMFAT-501) – F-35B Lightning II
  - Marine Wing Support Detachment 273 (MWSD-273)

4th Marine Aircraft Wing

- Marine Aircraft Group 41
  - Marine Fighter Training Squadron 402 (VMFT-402) – F-5N Tiger II

== Aircraft on display at the entrance ==
- 135841 - North American FJ-3 Fury representing VMF-312
- 147772 - Douglas A-4C Skyhawk representing MALS-31
- 146963 - Vought F-8C Crusader representing VMF-122
- 152270 - McDonnell Douglas F-4N Phantom II representing VMFA-251
- 163157 - McDonnell Douglas F/A-18 Hornet representing VMFA-115
- 152530 - Boing Vertol HH-46D Sea Knight representing Marine Corps Search and Rescue

== Education ==
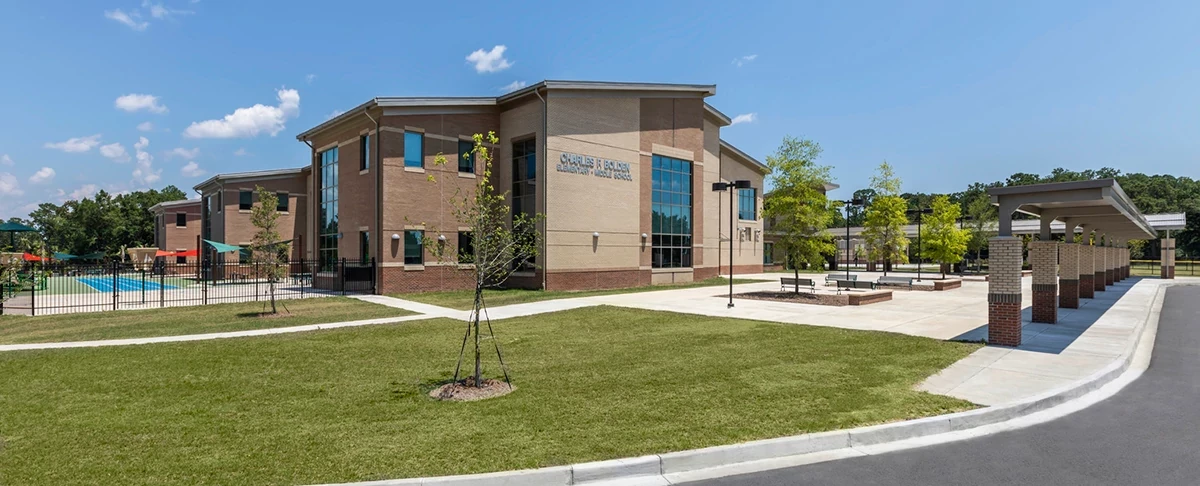
Bolden Elementary/Middle School

The Department of Defense Education Activity (DoDEA) is the local school district for the following people living on the property of MCAS Beaufort: children of Department of Defense employees living in the permanent housing, and children of civilians working for the United States federal government living in the permanent housing. The DoDEA operates Elliott Elementary School (PreKindergarten-Grade 2) and Bolden Elementary/Middle School (grades 3-8).

Beaufort County School District (BCSD) operates public high schools serving MCAS Beaufort, and in sum has the highest number of students, of any school system, affiliated with MCAS Beaufort. Battery Creek High School is the zoned public high school for MCAS Beaufort. Additionally, while BCSD does not specify school zoning for MCAS Beaufort for the elementary level, in 2024 it stated that Robert Smalls International Academy is the zoned middle school.

== See also ==
- List of United States Marine Corps installations
- List of airports in South Carolina
