= Marine Aircraft Group 31 =

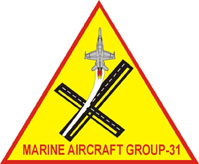
- MAG-31 Insignia
- Active: 1 February 1943 – present
- Country: United States
- Branch: United States Marine Corps
- Type: Fixed Wing Aircraft Group
- Role: Offensive Air Support; Antiair Warfare; Aerial Reconnaissance
- Part of: 2nd Marine Aircraft Wing; II Marine Expeditionary Force
- Garrison/HQ: Marine Corps Air Station Beaufort
- Motto: "Going the Distance... Going for Speed!"
- Engagements: World War II; Battle of Okinawa; Operation Desert Storm; Operation Deny Flight; Operation Enduring Freedom; Operation Iraqi Freedom

Commanders
- Commanding Officer: Col. Clayton D. Gard III

Marine Aircraft Group 31 (MAG-31) is a United States Marine Corps aviation group based at Marine Corps Air Station Beaufort, South Carolina that is currently composed of one F/A-18C Hornet squadron, one F-35B Lightning II training squadron, two F-35B Lightning II squadrons, and an aviation logistics squadron. It falls under the command of the 2nd Marine Aircraft Wing.

== Mission ==
Provide air support to Marine Air Ground Task Force commanders.

== Subordinate units ==
F/A-18 Hornet Squadrons

- VMFA-312 "Checkerboards"

F-35B Lightning II Squadrons

- VMFA-224 "Bengals"
- VMFAT-501 "Warlords"
- VMFA-533 "Hawks"

Aviation Logistics Squadron

- MALS-31 "Stingers"

== History ==
Marine Aircraft Group 31 was commissioned at Marine Corps Air Station Cherry Point, North Carolina, on 1 February 1943 under the command of Major Ralph K. Rottet. In September 1943, MAG-31 left the United States for Samoa where its squadrons would be stationed at numerous Samoan bases. During much of 1944 the squadron would fly neutralization missions against many of the Japanese garrisons that had been by-passed in the Marshall Islands such as Rabaul.

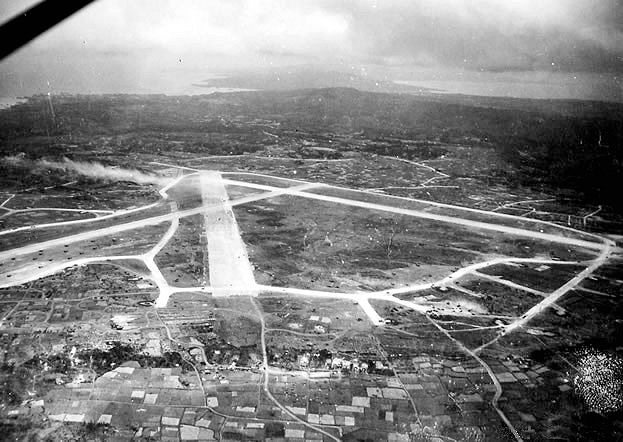
Yontan airfield, Okinawa, 1945

During the Battle of Okinawa, MAG-31 came ashore on 7 April and began operating from Yontan Airfield on Okinawa. They were immediately able to put 80 out of 109 aircraft into the fight and maintained a combat air patrol from 1750 until dark to aid in the fight against the kamikaze attacks that were devastating the American Fleet. During the battle they also provided close air support for the Marines and Soldiers on the ground. While on Okinawa, MAG-31 was commanded by Colonel John C. Munn, who was later promoted to lieutenant general and served as the Assistant Commandant of the Marine Corps. The squadron stayed at Yontan Airfield until 1 July when they moved to Chimu Airfield further north on the island where they would stay until the end of the war. During their time on Okinawa the squadron also operated over Kyushu, the Chinese Coast, the East China Sea area and many places in between Formosa and Kyushu.

On 12 October 1945, Marine Aircraft Group 31 departed Okinawa for Yokosuka, Japan, becoming the first Marine land-based MAG to operate in the Japanese homeland. The MAG was transferred from the 2nd Marine Aircraft Wing to the 4th Marine Aircraft Wing on 12 February 1946, and then to the Fleet Marine Force Pacific 13 March 1946.

The group returned to the United States 5 July 1946 as a night fighter group,. and was stationed at Marine Corps Air Station Miramar, San Diego, California until it was decommissioned on May 31, 1947.

MAG-31 was reactivated March 17, 1952, at MCAS Cherry Point, North Carolina, and transferred to Marine Corps Air Station Miami, Florida, operating as a part of the 3rd Marine Aircraft Wing until it was again decommissioned on January 31, 1959.

On November 1, 1961, MAG-31 was again reactivated in a cadre status with six officers and 75 enlisted men to allow the new unit to properly form. The unit was based at Marine Corps Air Station Beaufort, South Carolina, as part of the 2nd Marine Aircraft Wing.

== See also ==
- United States Marine Corps Aviation
- List of United States Marine Corps aircraft groups
- List of United States Marine Corps aircraft squadrons
