= North American FJ Fury =

North American FJ Fury (also North American F-1 Fury) may refer to several members of a group of fighter and fighter-bomber aircraft, built by North American Aviation for the US Navy, and related in varying degrees to the F-86 Sabre this firm produced for the US Air Force:

- North American FJ-1 Fury, the original straight-winged jet fighter model, 31 produced. It formed the basis for the development of the swept-wing F-86 Sabre. The FJ-1 was powered by the Allison J35-A-2.
- North American FJ-2/-3 Fury, The FJ-2 was powered by the General Electric J47-GE-2. The FJ-3 was powered by the Wright J65-W-4. Navalized versions of the F-86 Sabre; 741 produced.
- North American FJ-4 Fury, a substantial redesign of the FJ-3 Fury; 374 produced. The FJ-4 was powered by the Wright J65-W-16A; with some variants designated the F-1E and F-1F
- North American FJ-5, proposed navalized variant of the F-107.
