= Marine Aviation Logistics Squadron 42 =

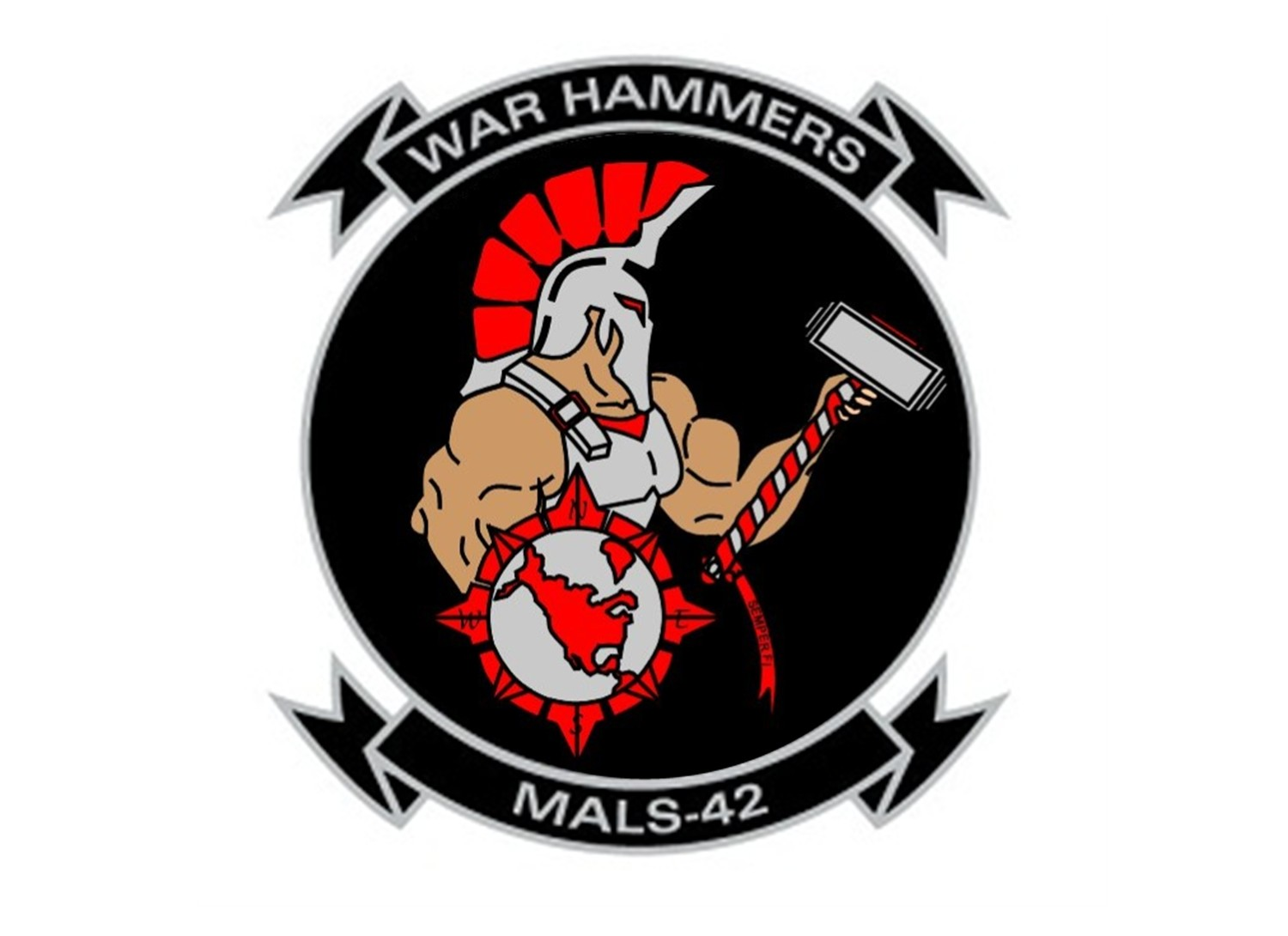
- MALS-42 Insignia
- Active: 18 June 1992–2008
- Country: United States
- Branch: United States Marine Corps
- Type: Logistics
- Role: Aviation logistics support
- Part of: Marine Aircraft Group 42; 4th Marine Aircraft Wing
- Garrison/HQ: Naval Air Station Atlanta
- Nickname(s): War Hammers
- Engagements: Operation Enduring Freedom

Commanders
- Commanding officer: LtCol Stuart M. Swan

Marine Aviation Logistics Squadron 42 was a reserve aviation logistics support unit of the United States Marine Corps. They fell under the command of Marine Aircraft Group 42 and 4th Marine Aircraft Wing and were based at Naval Air Station Atlanta. MALS-42 provided direct support to VMFA-142 and HMLA-773 and Navy squadrons VAW-77 and VR-46 and indirect support to two tactical Marine squadrons HMLA-773 Det A and HMM-774. Due to a re-organization within Marine aviation, MALS-42 was deactivated in 2008.

== Mission ==
Provide aviation logistics support to MAG-42 in garrison and contingencies to include (1) intermediate-level aviation maintenance, (2) aviation ordnance, (3) aviation supply, and (4) management information systems. As a unit, MALS-42 is also tasked to support the Fleet Replacement Squadron (FRS) mission during major regional conflicts.

== History ==
=== 1990s ===
MALS-49 Detachment B was redesignated MALS-42 (-) on 18 June 1992. MALS-42 consists of a headquarters unit, MALS-42(-), located at NAS Alameda, DET A located at Marine Corps Air Station Miramar, DET B located at Naval Air Station Norfolk, and DET C located at Naval Air Station Joint Reserve Base New Orleans, Louisiana. MALS-42 has provided aviation logistical support at CAX during annual training periods, conducted off-site training evolutions at MALS-14, MALS-26 and MALS-39. In 1996, MALS-42 was tasked to draft the Fleet Replacement Squadron (FRS) Plan under which a Reserve Marine Aviation Logistics Squadron (MALS) would be activated to replace an intermediate level maintenance squadron during a Major Regional Conflict (MRC).

=== Global War on Terror ===
MALS-42 was activated 13 February 2003 and assigned to 3rd Marine Aircraft Wing in order to execute the Fleet Replacement Squadron (FRS) Mission in support of Operation Iraqi Freedom (OIF). As a unit, MALS-42 remained activated under the FRS until 12 February 2004. September 2003 found MALS-42 in receipt of orders to plan and execute the deployment of an MALS-42 detachment to Bagram Air Base, Afghanistan as part of HMLA-773 deployment in support of Operation Enduring Freedom (OEF). As a whole three successive detachments supported combat operations until September 2005. On 29 August 2005, the squadron was called on to support humanitarian relief efforts in support of Hurricane Katrina. Forward deployed personnel participated forward for 30 days and continued to provide maintenance support up through 3 December 2005.

== See also ==
- United States Marine Corps Aviation
- Organization of the United States Marine Corps
- List of United States Marine Corps aviation support units
