= List of active United States Marine Corps aircraft squadrons =

This is a list of all of the active squadrons that exist in the United States Marine Corps, sorted by type. Most squadrons have changed names and designations many times over the years, so they are listed by their current designation.

To see Marine Aviation units sorted by command hierarchy, see aviation combat element.

== Squadron designations ==
The basic tactical and administrative unit of United States Marine Corps aviation is the squadron. Marine Corps aircraft squadrons use the same designation lettering as the US Navy. Fixed-wing aircraft squadrons (heavier than air) and tiltrotor squadrons are denoted by the letter "V", while Rotary wing (helicopter) squadrons use "H." All Marine squadrons use “M” as a second letter to distinguish them from a Navy squadron, with a third or fourth letter used to identify the squadron’s purpose/mission. For example, while VFA-123 would be Navy Fighter/Attack Squadron 123 VMFA-123 would be Marine Fighter/Attack Squadron. During the early days of naval aviation, squadron numbering was not linear as some were numbered in ascending order and others took numbers from the wing or the ship to which they were assigned. From 1920 to 1941, Marine flying squadrons were identified by one digit numbers. This changed on 1 July 1941, when all existing squadrons were redesignated to a three-digit system. The first two numbers were supposed to identify the squadrons parent group but with the rapid expansion during World War II and frequent transfer of squadrons this system fell apart.

== Rotary-wing aircraft ==
=== Marine Helicopter Squadron ===
The squadron is responsible for the helicopter transportation of the president of the United States, vice president, Cabinet members and VIPs. In addition to its VIP transport role, it is also tasked with operational test and evaluation (OT&E) of new flight systems for Marine Corps helicopters. The squadron flies the VH-3D Sea King the VH-60N Whitehawk, and the MV-22 Osprey. These were due to be replaced by the VH-71 Kestrel, however that program was cancelled in April 2009. HMX-1 is now preparing for the arrival of the VH-92A Patriot, which will replace the VH-3D that serves as Marine One. Lastly, HMX-1 provides support to training at The Basic School, providing aerial insertion for various training events, as well as MAGTF Air component orientation to the student officers.

Squadron Name	Insignia	Nickname	Date Commissioned	Senior Command	Station
HMX-1		Marine One	1 December 1947	Headquarters Marine Corps	MCAF Quantico, VA

=== Marine Heavy Helicopter Squadrons ===
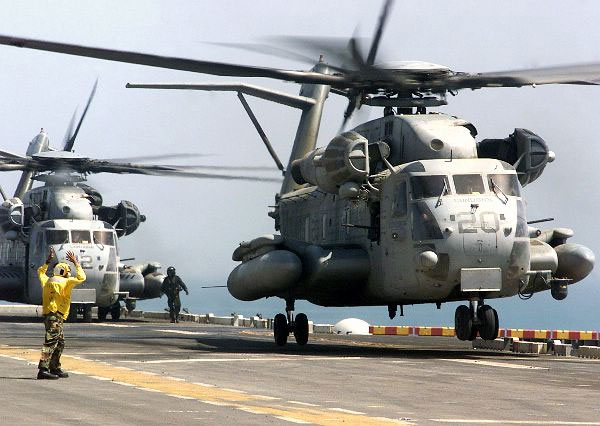
CH-53E Super Stallion

Heavy helicopter squadrons were first formed in 1966 when the Marine Corps began flying the heavy lift CH-53 Sea Stallion during the Vietnam War. Each squadron is equipped with sixteen CH-53E Super Stallion helicopters. In 2022 the replacement of the CH-53E with the CH-53K King Stallion began. Their primary role is moving cargo and equipment with the secondary role of transferring troops ashore in an amphibious assault. The CH-53Es are the most powerful helicopter in the U.S. military inventory today. As part of the current reorganization of the Corps, HMH-462 will be decommissioned by 2030.

Squadron Name	Insignia	Nickname	Aircraft	Date Commissioned	Senior Command	Station
HMH-361		Flying Tigers	CH-53E	25 February 1952	MAG-16, 3rd MAW	MCAS Miramar, CA
HMH-461		Iron Horse	CH-53K	15 March 1944	MAG-29, 2nd MAW	MCAS New River, NC
HMH-462		Heavy Haulers	CH-53E	15 April 1944	MAG-16, 3rd MAW	MCAS Miramar, CA
HMH-464		Condors	CH-53K	5 April 1944	MAG-29, 2nd MAW	MCAS New River, NC
HMH-465		Warhorse	CH-53E	1 December 1981	MAG-16, 3rd MAW	MCAS Miramar, CA
HMH-466		Wolfpack	CH-53E	30 November 1984	MAG-16, 3rd MAW	MCAS Miramar, CA
HMH-772		Hustler	CH-53E	15 April 1958	MAG-49, 4th MAW	McGuire Air Force Base, NJ

=== Marine Heavy Helicopter Training Squadron ===
The squadron trains newly designated (i.e., winged) Naval Aviators, conversion pilots, refresher pilots, and enlisted aircrew on the CH-53E Super Stallion.

Squadron Name	Insignia	Nickname	Date Commissioned	Senior Command	Station
HMHT-302		Phoenix	1 November 1966	MAG-29, 2nd MAW	MCAS New River, NC

=== Marine Light Attack Helicopter Squadrons ===
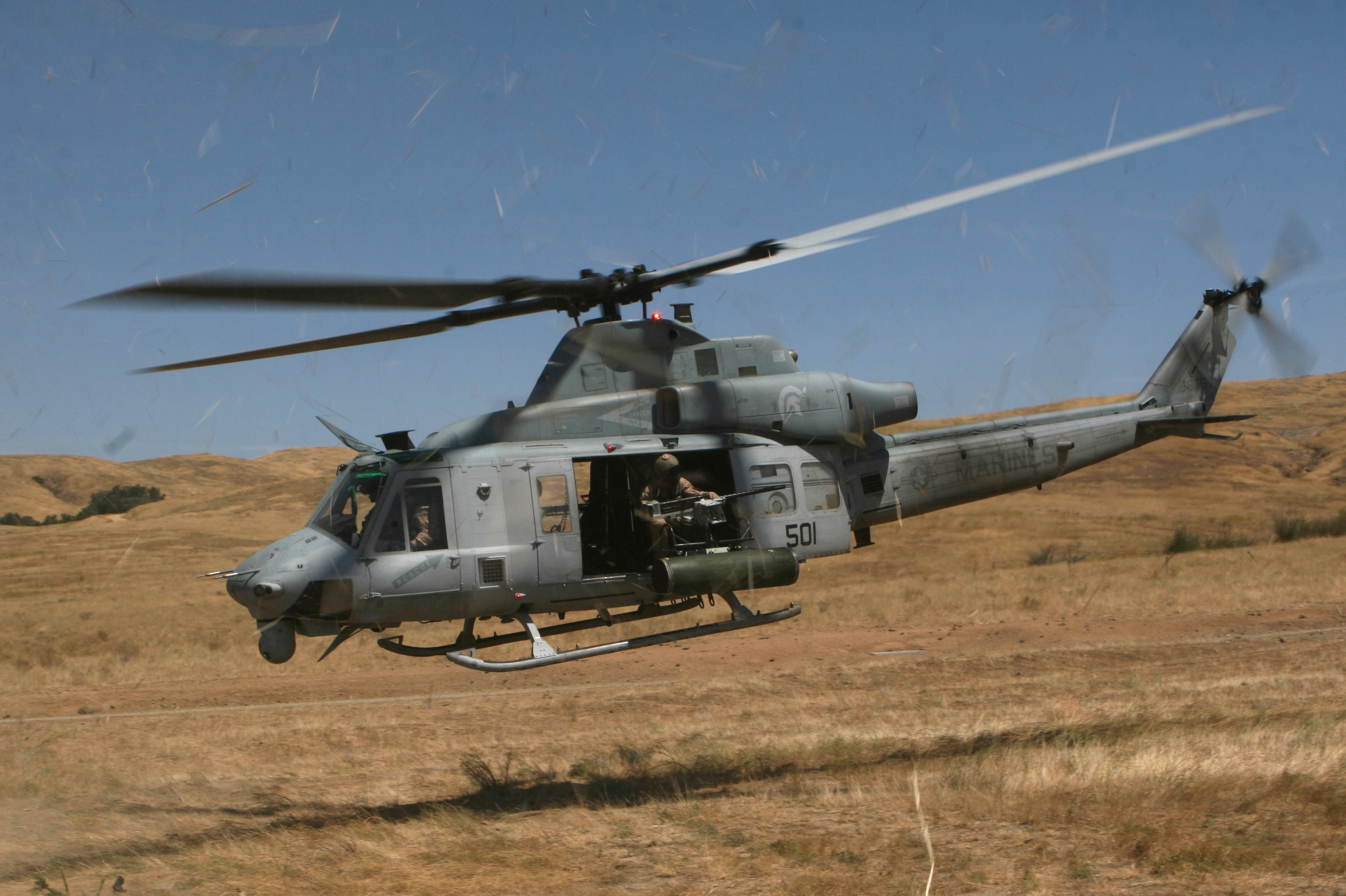
UH-1Y Venom

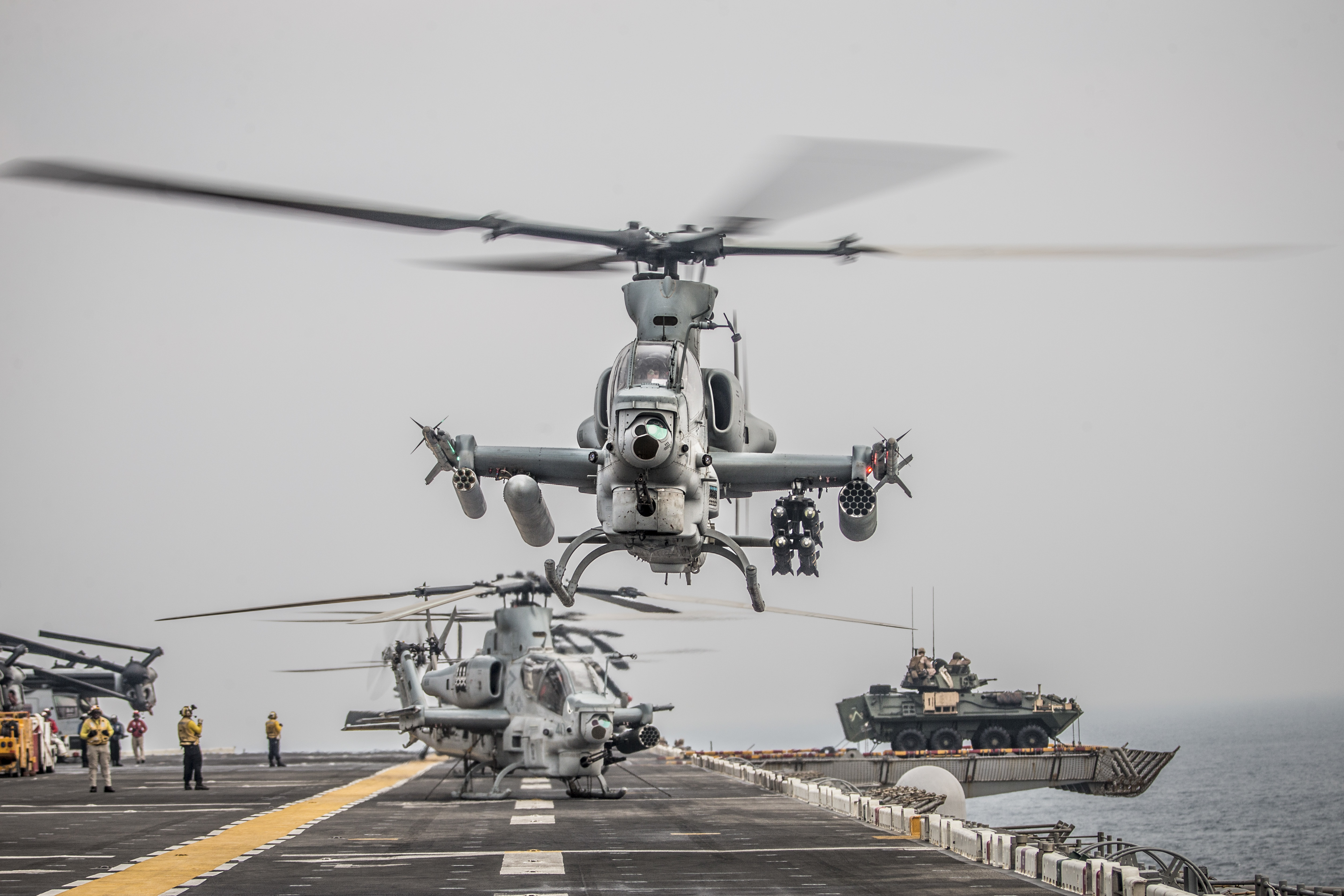
AH-1Z Viper

The Marine Corps’ light attack squadrons are composite squadrons made up of 18 AH-1Z Vipers and 9 UH-1Y Venoms. The primary missions of the Viper is close air support, forward air control, reconnaissance and armed escort, while the Huey provides airborne command and control, utility support, supporting arms coordination and medical evacuation. The H-1 upgrade program will see both the AH-1 and UH-1 get greater power, improved avionics and an 85% commonality of parts. The transition to the UH-1Y was completed in August 2014 when HMLA-773 flew the UH-1N for the last time. Due to the need for more light attack squadrons, the Marine Corps began adding new squadrons in 2008. HMLA-469 was the newest squadron. However, as part of the re-organization of the corps, HMLA-469 was de-activated in 2022 and HMLA-367 will be de-activated by 2030.

Squadron Name	Insignia	Nickname	Date Commissioned	Senior Command	Station
HMLA-167		Warriors	1 April 1968	MAG-29, 2nd MAW	MCAS New River, NC
HMLA-169		Vipers	30 September 1971	MAG-39, 3rd MAW	MCAS Camp Pendleton, CA
HMLA-267		Stingers	15 February 1944	MAG-39, 3rd MAW	MCAS Camp Pendleton, CA
HMLA-269		The Gunrunners	22 February 1977	MAG-29, 2nd MAW	MCAS New River, NC
HMLA-367		Scarface	1 December 1943	MAG-39, 3rd MAW	MCAS Camp Pendleton, CA
HMLA-369		Gunfighters	1 April 1972	MAG-39, 3rd MAW	MCAS Camp Pendleton, CA
HMLA-773		Red Dog	June 1968	MAG-49, 4th MAW	Joint Base McGuire–Dix–Lakehurst, NJ
HMLA-775		Coyote	1 October 2016	MAG-41, 4th MAW	MCAS Camp Pendleton, CA

=== Marine Light Attack Helicopter Training Squadron ===
The squadron trains newly designated (i.e., winged) Naval Aviators, conversion pilots, refresher pilots, and enlisted aircrew on the UH-1Y Venom, and the AH-1Z Viper.

Squadron Name	Insignia	Nickname	Date Commissioned	Senior Command	Station
HMLAT-303		Atlas	30 April 1982	MAG-39, 3rd MAW	MCAS Camp Pendleton, CA

== Tiltrotor Aircraft ==
=== Marine Medium Tiltrotor Squadrons ===
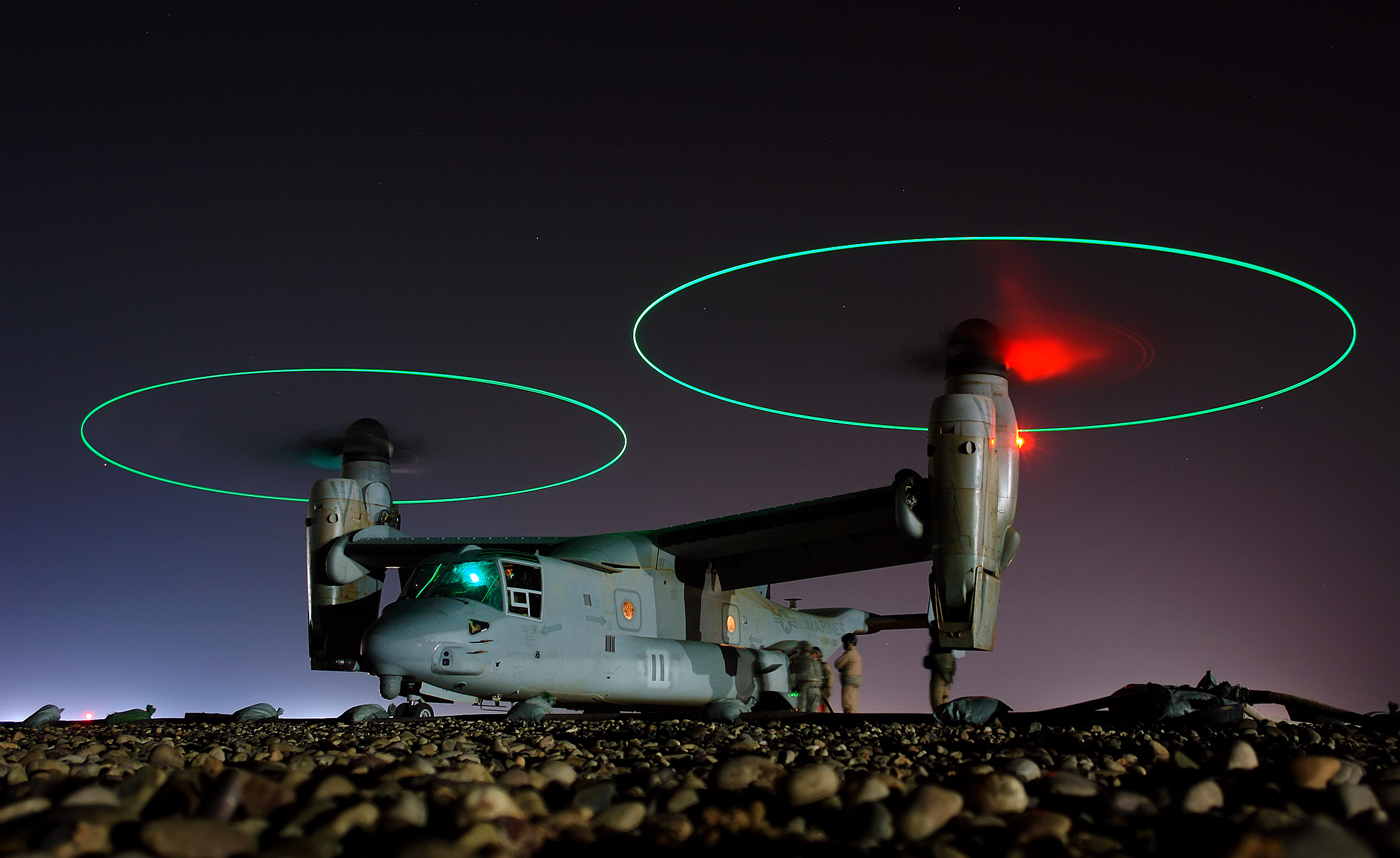
MV-22 Osprey

Marine tiltrotor squadrons are new units operating the MV-22 Osprey with their main mission being assault support. The Osprey offers twice the speed, five times the range, and can fly more than twice as high as the helicopters they are replacing. As the Marine Corps’ number one aviation acquisition priority, the Osprey replaced the aging fleet of CH-46 Sea Knight helicopters and is a cornerstone of the capstone concept of Expeditionary maneuver warfare. As of October 2018, the Marine Corps had 17 Fully Operationally Capable (FOC) MV-22 squadrons. VMM-268, VMM-364, and VMM-164 reached FOC in FY16 and VMM-362 in 2018. The newest Osprey squadron, VMM-264, will stand up in FY27, completing the Marine Corps' transition to 18 active component MV-22 squadrons. Each squadron operates 12 aircraft.

Squadron Name	Insignia	Nickname	Date Commissioned	Senior Command	Station	Note
VMM-161		Greyhawks	January 15, 1951	MAG-16, 3rd MAW	MCAS Miramar, CA	
VMM-162		Golden Eagles	June 30, 1952	MAG-26, 2nd MAW	MCAS New River, NC	
VMM-163		Evil Eyes	December 1, 1951	MAG-16, 3rd MAW	MCAS Miramar, CA	
VMM-164		Knightriders	July 1, 1962	MAG-39, 3rd MAW	MCAS Camp Pendleton, CA	
VMM-165		White Knights	July 1, 1965	MAG-16, 3rd MAW	MCAS Miramar, CA	
VMM-261		Raging Bulls	April 5, 1951	MAG-26, 2nd MAW	MCAS New River, NC	
VMM-262		Flying Tigers	September 1, 1951	MAG-36, 1st MAW	MCAS Futenma, Japan	
VMM-263		Thunder Chickens	June 16, 1952	MAG-26, 2nd MAW	MCAS New River, NC	
VMM-264		Black Knights	June 30, 1959	MAG-26, 2nd MAW	MCAS New River, NC	
VMM-265		Dragons	October 1, 1962	MAG-36, 1st MAW	MCAS Futenma, Japan	
VMM-266		Fighting Griffins	April 26, 1983	MAG-26, 2nd MAW	MCAS New River, NC	
VMM-268		Red Dragons	April 26, 1983	MAG-24, 1st MAW	MCB Hawaii, HI	
VMM-362		Ugly Angels	April 30, 1952	MAG-16, 3rd MAW	MCAS Miramar, CA	
VMM-363		Red Lions	June 2, 1952	MAG-24, 1st MAW	MCB Hawaii, HI	
VMM-364		Purple Foxes	September 1, 1961	MAG-39, 3rd MAW	MCAS Camp Pendleton, CA	
VMM-365		Blue Knights	July 1, 1963	MAG-26, 2nd MAW	MCAS New River, NC	
VMM-764		Moonlight	April 15, 1958	MAG-41, 4th MAW	MCAS Miramar, CA	
VMM-774		Wild Goose	September 5, 1958	MAG-49, 4th MAW	MCAS New River, NC	

=== Marine Medium Tiltrotor Training Squadron ===
The squadron provides new and conversion training to Marine Corps and Air Force pilots and units in the use and maintenance of the Osprey tiltrotor aircraft.

Squadron Name	Insignia	Nickname	Date Commissioned	Senior Command	Station	Notes
VMMT-204		Raptors	May 1, 1972	2nd MAW	MCAS New River, NC	

== Fixed-Wing Aircraft ==
=== Marine Fighter Attack Squadrons ===
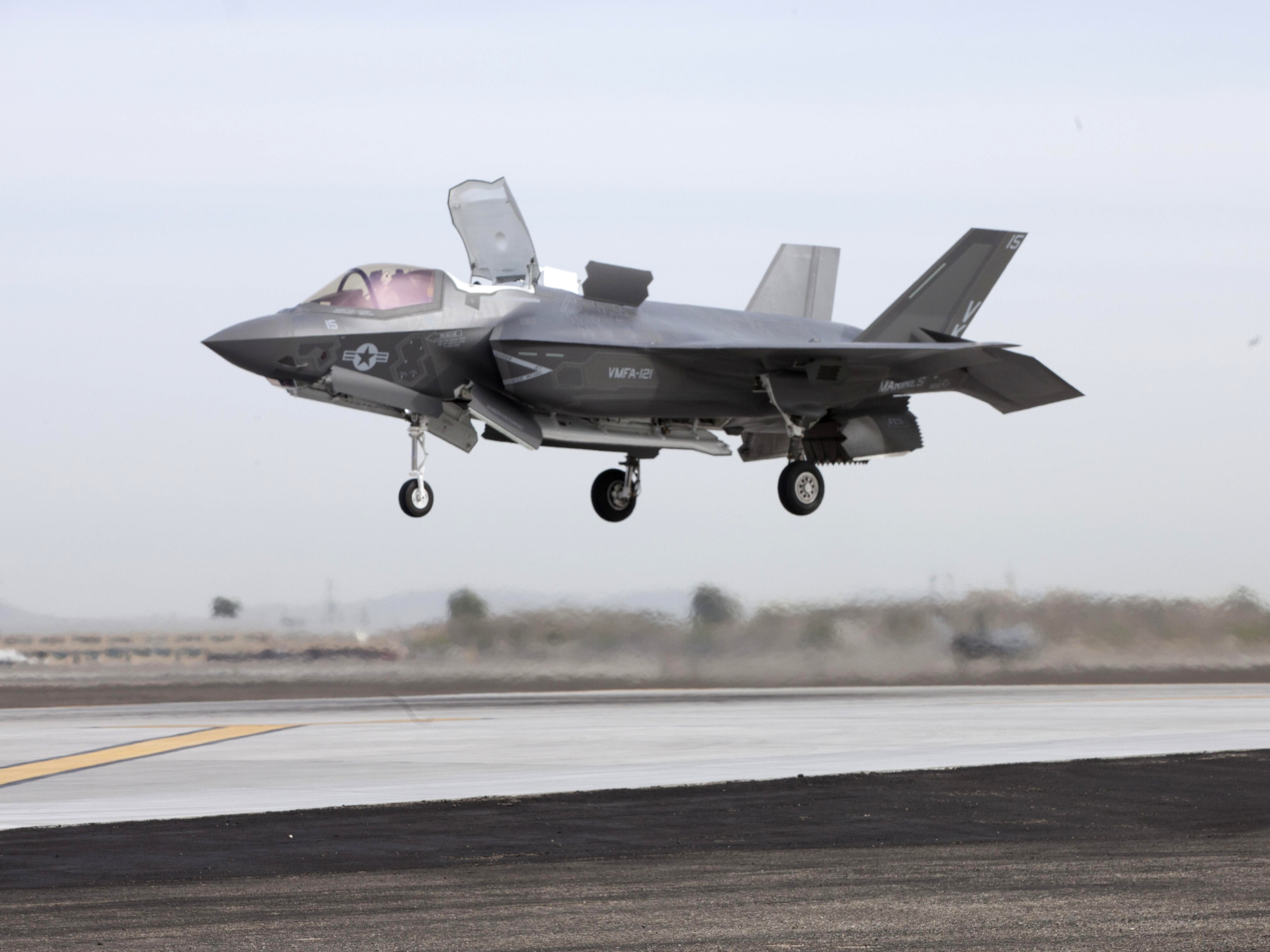
F-35B Lightning II

The Marine Corps' VMFA squadrons fly the F/A-18 Hornet and F-35 Lightning II. Their primary mission is to attack and destroy surface targets, during both day and nighttime operations, under all weather conditions; conduct multi-sensor imagery reconnaissance; provide supporting arms coordination; and intercept and destroy enemy aircraft in all weather conditions. The current F/A-18s saw first deployments during Operation Desert Storm, after having replaced the A-6 Intruder. Each Hornet squadron operates 12 aircraft and each F-35 squadron operates 10 to 12 aircraft.

Squadron Name	Insignia	Nickname	Aircraft	Date Commissioned	Senior Command	Station
VMFA-112		Cowboys	F/A-18C	1 March 1942	MAG-41, 4th MAW	NASJRB Fort Worth, TX
VMFA-115		Silver Eagles	F-35C	1 July 1943	MAG-14, 2nd MAW	MCAS Cherry Point, NC
VMFA-121		Green Knights	F-35B	24 June 1941	MAG-12, 1st MAW	MCAS Iwakuni, Japan
VMFA-122		Werewolves	F-35B	1 March 1942	MAG-13, 3rd MAW	MCAS Yuma, AZ
VMFA-211		Wake Island Avengers	F-35B	1 January 1937	MAG-13, 3rd MAW	MCAS Yuma, AZ
VMFA-214		Black Sheep	F-35B	1 July 1942	MAG-13, 3rd MAW	MCAS Yuma, AZ
VMFA-224		Fighting Bengals	F-35B	1 May 1942	MAG-31, 2nd MAW	MCAS Beaufort, SC
VMFA-225		Vikings	F-35B	1 January 1943	MAG-13, 3rd MAW	MCAS Yuma, AZ
VMFA-231		Ace of Spades	F-35B	8 February 1919	MAG-14, 2nd MAW	MCAS Cherry Point, NC
VMFA-232		Red Devils	F/A-18C	1 September 1925	MAG-11, 3rd MAW	MCAS Miramar, CA
VMFA-242		Bats	F-35B	1 July 1943	MAG-12, 1st MAW	MCAS Iwakuni, Japan
VMFA-251		Thunderbolts	F-35C	1 December 1941	MAG-14, 2nd MAW	MCAS Cherry Point, NC
VMFA-311		Tomcats	F-35C	1 December 1942	MAG-11, 3rd MAW	MCAS Miramar, CA
VMFA-312		Checkerboard	F/A-18C	1 June 1943	MAG-31, 2nd MAW	MCAS Beaufort, SC
VMFA-314		Black Knights	F-35C	1 October 1943	MAG-11, 3rd MAW	MCAS Miramar, CA
VMFA-323		Death Rattlers	F/A-18C	1 August 1943	MAG-11, 3rd MAW	MCAS Miramar, CA
VMFA-533		Hawks	F-35B	1 October 1943	MAG-31, 2nd MAW	MCAS Beaufort, SC
VMFA-542		Tigers	F-35B	6 March 1944	MAG-14, 2nd MAW	MCAS Cherry Point, NC

F-35B/C Lightning II (VMFA) Plan

- VMA-223 will transition to F-35B in 2027.
- VMFA-312 will transition to F-35B in 2028 at MCAS Cherry Point, NC.
- VMFA-232 will transition to F-35C in 2029.
- VMFA-323 will transition to F-35C in 2029.
- VMFA-112 will transition as a reserve F-35C squadron in 2030 at MCAS Beaufort, SC.
- VMFA-134 will reactivate as a reserve F-35C squadron in 2030 at MCAS Miramar, CA.

=== Marine Fighter Attack Training Squadrons ===
VMFAT squadrons train newly designated Naval Aviators to fly Marine Corps Aircraft.

Squadron Name	Insignia	Nickname	Aircraft	Date Commissioned	Senior Command	Station
VMFAT-501		Warlords	F-35B	15 February 1944	MAG-31, 2nd MAW	MCAS Beaufort, SC
VMFAT-502		Flying Nightmares	F-35B	15 February 1944	MAG-11, 3rd MAW	MCAS Miramar, CA

=== Marine Fighter Training Squadron ===
VMFT-401 and VMFT-402 are the only aggressor squadrons in the Marine Corps. They fly the F-5N Tiger II and provide instruction to active and reserve squadrons through dissimilar adversary combat tactics. The squadrons are based at Marine Corps Air Station Yuma, AZ, and Marine Corps Air Station Beaufort, SC, respectively, and are assigned to Marine Aircraft Group 41, 4th Marine Aircraft Wing, Marine Forces Reserve.

Squadron Name	Insignia	Nickname	Aircraft	Date Commissioned	Senior Command	Station
VMFT-401		Snipers	F-5N	18 March 1986	MAG-41, 4th MAW	MCAS Yuma, AZ
VMFT-402		Grim Reapers	F-5N	September 2024	MAG-41, 4th MAW	MCAS Beaufort, SC

=== Marine Aerial Refueler Transport Squadrons ===
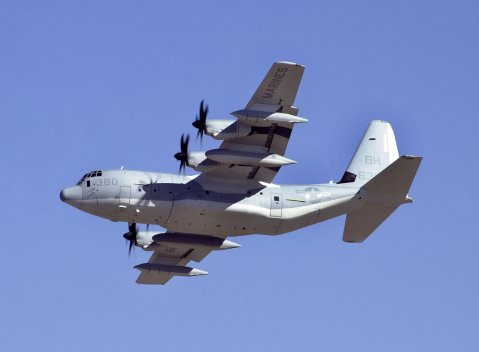
KC-130J Hercules

VMGR squadrons operate the KC-130 Hercules tanker/transport. Their primary missions are aerial and rapid ground refueling, transportation of personnel and cargo to include MEDEVACs and parachute insertions, flying the airborne version of the Direct Air Support Center (DASC) and emergency resupply into unimproved landing zones.

Squadron Name	Insignia	Nickname	Aircraft	Date Commissioned	Senior Command	Station
VMGR-152		Sumos	KC-130J	11 March 1942	MAG-12, 1st MAW	MCAS Iwakuni, Japan
VMGR-153		Hercules	KC-130J	1 March 1942	MAG-24, 1st MAW	MCAS Kaneohe Bay, Hawaii
VMGR-234		Rangers	KC-130J	1 May 1942	MAG-41, 4th MAW	NASJRB Fort Worth, TX
VMGR-252		Otis	KC-130J	1 June 1928	MAG-14, 2nd MAW	MCAS Cherry Point, NC
VMGR-352		Raiders	KC-130J	1 April 1943	MAG-11, 3rd MAW	MCAS Miramar, CA

=== Marine Transport Squadrons ===
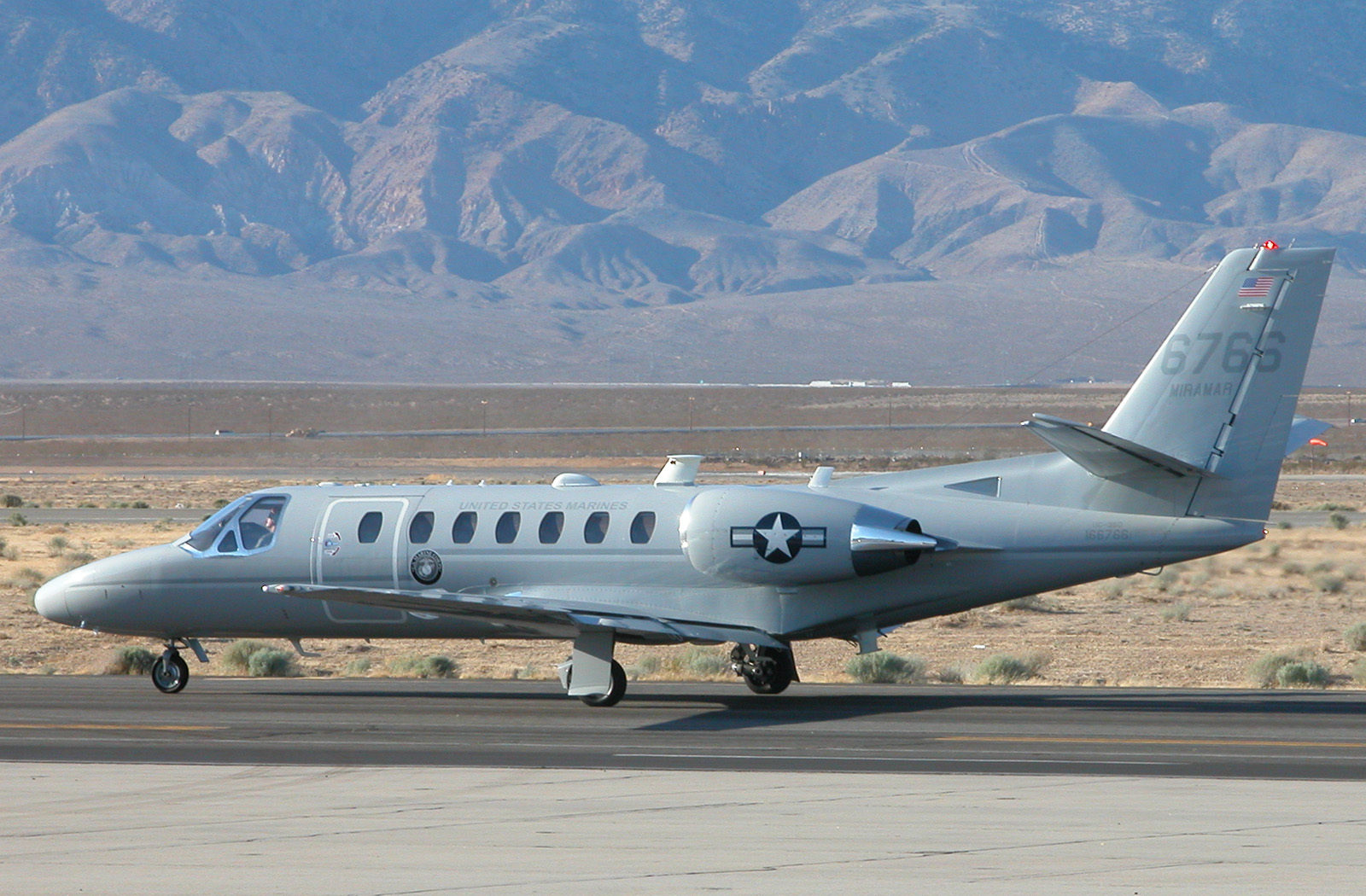
UC-35D

VMR squadrons provide movement of key personnel and critical logistics support around the world. They also provide movement of high priority passengers and cargo during wartime in support of operations and other critical commitments.

Squadron Name	Insignia	Nickname	Aircraft	Date Commissioned	Senior Command	Station
VMR-1		Roadrunners	C-40A	January 1943	MAG-41, 4th MAW	Naval Air Station Joint Reserve Base Fort Worth, TX
VMR Andrews			UC-35D	October 2004	MAG-49, 4th MAW	Joint Base Andrews, MD
VMR Belle Chasse			UC-12W		MAG-49, 4th MAW	Naval Air Station Joint Reserve Base New Orleans, LA

=== Marine Operational Test and Evaluation Squadron ===
The squadron is a Marine Corps test and development unit. Its mission is to conduct operational testing and evaluation of Marine Corps fixed, tiltrotor, and rotary-wing aircraft. The unit was re-designated to VMX-1 (from VMX-22) on 13 May 2016.

Squadron Name	Insignia	Nickname	Aircraft	Date Commissioned	Senior Command	Station
VMX-1		Flying Lions	UH-1Y; AH-1Z; CH-53E/K; MV-22B; F-35B; RQ-21	28 August 2003	Operational Test and Evaluation Force	MCAS Yuma, AZ

== Unmanned Aerial Systems ==
=== Marine Unmanned Aerial Vehicle Squadrons ===
VMUs operate the MQ-9A Reaper unmanned aerial system (UAS) which provides Marine ground forces with reconnaissance, surveillance, and target acquisition. They also provide artillery spotting and can assist in search and rescue operations. Due to the high operational tempo of the VMU squadrons in the 2000s, the Marine Corps stood up VMU-3 in 2008 and VMU-4, a reserve unit, was activated in 2010 with the lineage of VMO-4. VMU-4 was deactivated in 2022 and in 2023 VMU-2 was redesignated VMUT-2 to train MQ-9 operators and maintenance personnel.

Squadron Name	Insignia	Nickname	Date Commissioned	Senior Command	Station
VMU-1		Watchdogs	21 January 1987	MAG-13, 3rd MAW	MCAS Yuma, AZ
VMU-3		Phantoms	12 September 2008	MAG-24, 1st MAW	MCAS Kaneohe Bay, HI

=== Marine Unmanned Aerial Vehicle Training Squadron ===
The squadron trains personnel in the operation and maintenance of the MQ-9A Reaper.

Squadron Name	Insignia	Nickname	Date Commissioned	Senior Command	Station
VMUT-2		Night Owls	June 1984	MAG-14, 2nd MAW	MCAS Cherry Point, NC

== See also ==
- United States Marine Corps Aviation
- Aviation combat element
- List of decommissioned United States Marine Corps aircraft squadrons
- List of United States Navy aircraft squadrons
- List of United States Marine Corps aircraft groups
- List of United States Marine Corps aircraft wings
- List of United States Marine Corps aviation support units
- List of United States Marine Corps battalions
