= Marine Wing Support Squadron 472 =

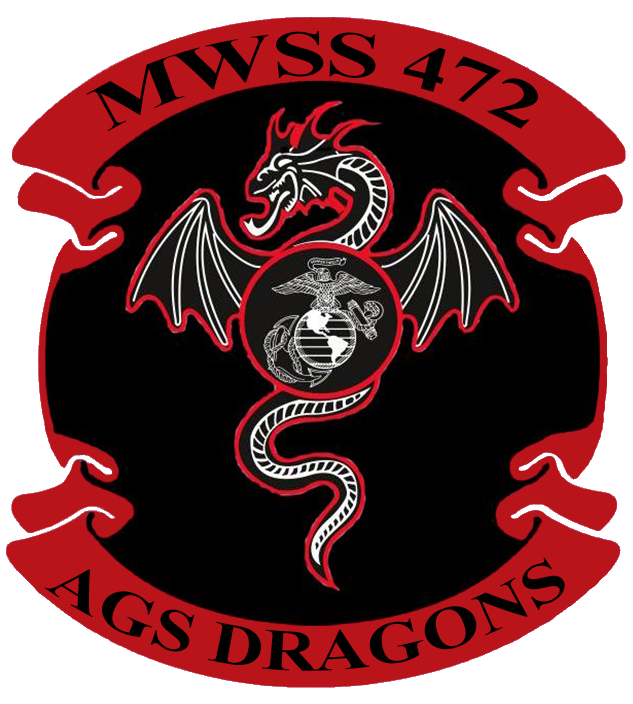
- MWSS-472's insignia after 2014
- Country: United States
- Branch: United States Marine Corps
- Type: Squadron
- Role: Aviation Ground Support
- Size: 500 Marines
- Part of: Marine Aircraft Group 49; 4th Marine Aircraft Wing
- Garrison/HQ: Joint Base McGuire-Dix-Lakehurst
- Nickname: Dragons
- Engagements: Operation Iraqi Freedom

Commanders
- Current commander: LtCol R. Baker

Marine Wing Support Squadron 472 (MWSS-472) is a reserve aviation ground support unit of the United States Marine Corps. The Headquarters Element of MWSS 472 (-) is located at Joint Base McGuire-Dix-Lakehurst, New Jersey. In addition to serving as the squadron headquarters, it is also the primary site for all of the Airfield Operations specific Military Occupational Specialties (MOSs). Communications MOS's are also located at the Squadron (-) location. MWSS 472 Detachment A is located at Wyoming, Pennsylvania and serves as the squadron's primary site for motor transport operations and maintenance, as well as food service. Detachment B is located at Westover Air Reserve Base in Chicopee, Massachusetts and serves as the squadron's primary engineer services Site. The squadron falls under the command of Marine Aircraft Group 49 and the 4th Marine Aircraft Wing.

== Mission ==
Provide all essential Aviation Ground Support requirements to a designated fixed-wing or rotary-wing component of an Aviation Combat Element (ACE) and all supporting or attached elements of the Marine Air Control Group.

== History ==
Prior to 1988 MWSS-472 was designated Marine Air Base Squadron 46 (MABS 46) MABS 46 was headquartered at MCAS El Toro, subordinate to Marine Air Group 46, with subordinate units at NAS Whidbey Island, Washington and NAS Willow Grove, Pennsylvania. Subordinate sections included: Headquarters section, Base Services, Communications, Launch and recovery, Crash Fire Rescue, Motor Transport, Military police, Engineers, Tactical Airfield Fuel Dispensing, Tactical airfield armament, Airfield operation and Utilities.

December 1990 MWSS-472 was partially activated to relieve MWSS-372 in Sadia Arabia, after a five month deployment for Operation Desert Shield, before the start of Operation Desert Storm. Rotation was never initiated due to the end of the conflict and the unit stood down around May 1991.

MWSS-472 was activated and deployed in the summer of 2004 to Iraq's Al-Anbar province in support of Operation Iraqi Freedom II. The unit returned to CONUS in the winter of 2005 and deactivated the following summer. In 2009, the unit was again mobilized and sent to the same area of Iraq for its second combat deployment, until its return to CONUS in the early winter of 2010.

== See also ==
- United States Marine Corps Aviation
- Organization of the United States Marine Corps
- List of United States Marine Corps aviation support units
