= Marine Aviation Logistics Squadron 49 =

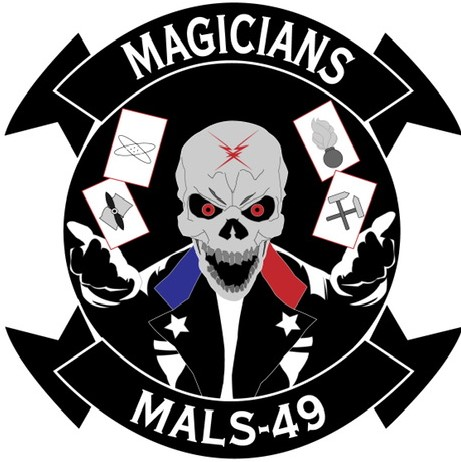
- MALS-49 Insignia
- Active: 1 July 1969 – present
- Country: United States
- Branch: United States Marine Corps
- Type: Logistics
- Role: Aviation logistics support
- Part of: Marine Aircraft Group 49; 4th Marine Aircraft Wing
- Garrison/HQ: Marine Corps Air Station New River
- Nickname: "Magicians"
- Motto: Gratis Non Est Sufficere
- Engagements: Operation Desert Storm; Operation Iraqi Freedom; Operation Enduring Freedom

Commanders
- Commanding Officer: LtCol Jeff Dean

Marine Aviation Logistics Squadron 49 (MALS-49) is a reserve aviation logistics support unit of the United States Marine Corps. They are currently based at Marine Corps Air Station New River in North Carolina, with Detachments in Joint Base McGuire–Dix–Lakehurst, NJ and Naval Air Station Joint Reserve Base New Orleans, LA and fall under the command of Marine Aircraft Group 49 (MAG-49) and the 4th Marine Aircraft Wing (4th MAW). The squadron is the only MALS in 4th MAW with an active duty core of maintenance and aviation supply personnel. MALS-49 is currently structured with six separate and distinct divisions of maintenance, supporting three separate and distinct sites, along with five flying squadrons.

== Mission ==
- Provide training and support for SMCR units to ensure readiness for mobilization.
- Provide aerial refueling service in support of Fleet Marine Force operations
- Provide air transport for personnel, equipment and supplies.
- Conduct other air operations as may be directed.
- Provide intermediate maintenance activity support to the squadrons assigned to MAG-49.
- Provide the requisite aviation supply support MAG-49.

== History ==
MALS-49 was activated on 1 July 1969 at Naval Air Station New York in Brooklyn, New York as Headquarters and Maintenance Squadron 49 (H&MS-49). The H&MS unit was relocated to Naval Air Station Lakehurst, New Jersey in 1970 and moved again to Naval Air Station Willow Grove, Pennsylvania in 1972.

In 1988, the unit was redesignated as Marine Aviation Logistics Squadron 49 with the headquarters located at NAS Willow Grove. During 1988 detachments were established at Andrews Air Force Base, Washington DC and Naval Air Station South Weymouth, Massachusetts. In 1992, the Marine Aviation Logistics Squadron 42 (MALS-42) detachment located at Stewart ANGB, Newburgh, New York was redesignated as a detachment of MALS-49, bringing the number of sites supported by MALS-49 to four. In February 1994 the MALS-49 flag was relocated from NAS Willow Groove to Stewart ANGB. In 2024, the flag was relocated to MCAS New River, with supporting detachments established in JB McGuire-Dix-Lakehurst and NASJRB New Orleans respectively.

In 2004, the unit activated reserve Marines in support of Operation Iraqi Freedom to serve as augmentees for MALS-16 when they deployed to Iraq.

== See also ==
- United States Marine Corps Aviation
- Organization of the United States Marine Corps
- List of United States Marine Corps aviation support units
