= Marine Aircraft Group 49 =

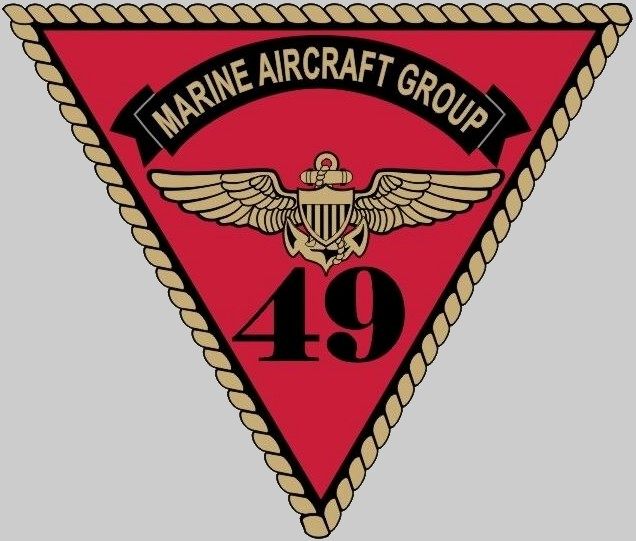
- MAG-49 Insignia
- Active: 26 February 1946 - present
- Country: United States
- Branch: United States Marine Corps
- Type: Marine Aviation Group
- Role: Assault Support; Offensive Air Support; Operational Support Airlift; Aviation Ground Support
- Size: 1,000 + Marines
- Part of: 4th Marine Aircraft Wing; Marine Forces Reserve
- Garrison/HQ: Fort Dix Joint Base McGuire–Dix–Lakehurst, N.J.
- Engagements: World War II; Operation Enduring Freedom; Operation Iraqi Freedom

Commanders
- Current commander: Col. Pablo J. Torres

Marine Aircraft Group 49 is a United States Marine Corps Reserve aviation unit based at the Fort Dix entity of Joint Base McGuire–Dix–Lakehurst, New Jersey that is currently composed of squadrons that fly the MV-22B, CH-53E, AH-1Z, UH-1Y, UC-35D and UC-12F/W aircraft as well as an Aviation Logistics Squadron and Wing Support Squadron.

== Mission ==
The mission of MAG 49 is to organize, train, and equip combat ready squadrons to augment and reinforce the Active Marine Forces in time of war, national emergency or contingency operations by providing personnel to conduct assault support, offensive air support, operational support airlift, aviation logistics and aviation ground support capabilities to relieve operational tempo for active duty forces.

== Subordinate units ==
Fixed Wing Squadrons

- Marine Transport Squadron Andrews
- Marine Transport Squadron Belle Chasse

Helicopter Squadrons

- HMH-772
- HMLA-773

Tiltrotor Squadron

- VMM-774

Aviation Support Squadrons

- Marine Aviation Logistics Squadron 49
- Marine Wing Support Squadron 472

Site Supports

- Site Support McGuire
- Site Support Wyoming
- Site Support Belle Chasse (MAG-49 Det C)
- Site Support New River (MAG-49 Det D)

== History ==
=== 1940s & 1950s ===
On 26 February 1946, Marine Air Reserve Training Command (MARTC) activated at Naval Air Station Glenview, Illinois and three Marine Aviation Detachments (MADS). Within a year, 21 more MADS formed consisting of 24 Marine Fighter Squadrons (VMF), and eight Ground Control Intercept Squadrons (MGCIS). One of these squadrons, VMF-451, was established at NAS Willow Grove in April 1946.

On 1 February 1947, MGCIS-17 organized at NAS Willow Grove under the MAD. In August 1950, Reserve Marines from MGCIS-17 mobilized for the Korean War and remained on active duty until reorganization of the squadron in October 1951. VMF-451 was activated as a unit on 3 January 1951, for Korean service.

On 24 June 1950, MGCIS-26 formed in New York City. On 3 August 1950, the unit mobilized until 30 June 1952, when members returned from active duty. In 1952, upon reorganization of the Marine Corps Reserve, 17 of the 21 MADS remained, all staffed by active duty Marines.

On 1 March 1954, MGCIS-26, Brooklyn, New York was re-designated a Marine Air Control Squadron (MACS) to reflect the Marine Corps-wide re-designation of many such units. On 15 April 1958, Helicopter Transport Squadron-772 was established. In October 1951, MACS-17 began reorganization at NAS Willow Grove after reservists were released from active duty.

In 1959, Marine Air Reserve Group 25 (MARG-25) was the senior Marine Reserve command at NAS Willow Grove, with VMF-511 attached. The 4th MAW experienced great change in 1962 when Marine Aircraft Group 43 was reactivated on 1 July along with Headquarters and Maintenance Squadron-43 (H&MS-43). Helicopter Transport Squadron-772 was re-designated Marine Medium Helicopter Squadron-772 (HMM-772) on 1 April 1962. On 1 February 1963, MACS-26 was re-designated Marine Air Traffic Control Unit 73 (MATCU-73), and on 1 March, Marine Air Base Squadron-43 (MABS-43) was reactivated at NAS Willow Grove.

=== 1960 through present ===
A major 4th MAW reorganization on 1 February 1965, saw H&MS-43, MABS-43, VMF-511, and MACS-17 all reassigned to MAG-43. MATCU-73 was assigned to the 4th MAW and remained in New York until 1 November 1965, when it was reassigned to MAG-43 and transferred to NAS Willow Grove on 1 May 1967. In 1971, HMM-772 transitioned to the CH-53 Sea Stallion helicopter, was re-designated HMH-772 and transferred to MAG-49 at NAS Willow Grove.

In September 1972, MAG-43 was re-designated MAG-49, and MAG-49 Headquarters moved from NAS Lakehurst, New Jersey to NAS Willow Grove.

In August 1991, MACS-48 Det B mobilized to conduct Air Traffic Control Operations at MCAS Yuma, MCAS El Toro and MCAS Camp Pendleton, at the onset of Operation Desert Shield and Operation Desert Storm. Members of MWSS-473, Det A were mobilized to MCAS New River, to support station operations while active duty personnel were deployed to Southwest Asia. Individual members of MAG-49, reserve and active duty, mobilized to serve with various units in the Saudi Arabian desert. Members of MWSS-473, Det D were Mobilized to MCAS Beaufort, SC.

HMH-772 mobilized shortly after the start of Operation Desert Storm in support of the Marine Corps' Unit Deployment Program (UDP). Initially sent to the 2nd Marine Aircraft Wing to augment with its sister squadron from NAS Dallas, HMH-772 was reassigned to the 3rd Marine Aircraft Wing at MCAS El Toro, CA to prepare for overseas deployment to the 1st Marine Aircraft Wing at MCAS Futenma, Okinawa, Japan. While deployed, HMH-772 participated in training deployments and helped evacuation efforts in the Republic of the Philippines (RP) following the eruption of Mount Pinatubo.

On 18 October 1997, Marine Light Attack Helicopter Squadron-773, Detachment A (HMLA-773, Det A) activated at MAG-49, NAS Willow Grove with 21 Marines and 9 aircraft. In 1998, HMH-772 transitioned from the Sikorsky CH-53D Sea Stallion to the CH-53E Super Stallion helicopter. In 2000, the Detachment changed from HMLA-773, Detachment A to HMLA-775, Detachment A, in accordance with a 4th MAW unit realignment strategy. During March 2000, HMLA-775 Detachment A moved from Willow Grove to Cambria Airport, Johnstown, Pennsylvania. In 2008 HMLA-775 Detachment A became HMLA-773 Detachment B.

In 2001, Marine Air Control Squadron 24 (MACS-24), Detachment B, NAS Willow Grove, was deactivated.

In 2011, MAG-49 moved from NAS Willow Grove to Joint Base McGuire-Dix-Lakehurst due to former's BRAC-directed closure.

On 16 June 2016, Site Support Warner Robins also known as MAG-49 Detachment Alpha at Robins Air Force Base was deactivated.

== See also ==
- United States Marine Corps Aviation
- List of United States Marine Corps aircraft groups
- List of United States Marine Corps aircraft squadrons
