= VMM-268 =

United States Marine Corps tiltrotor squadron consisting of MV-22 transport

Marine Medium Tiltrotor Squadron 268
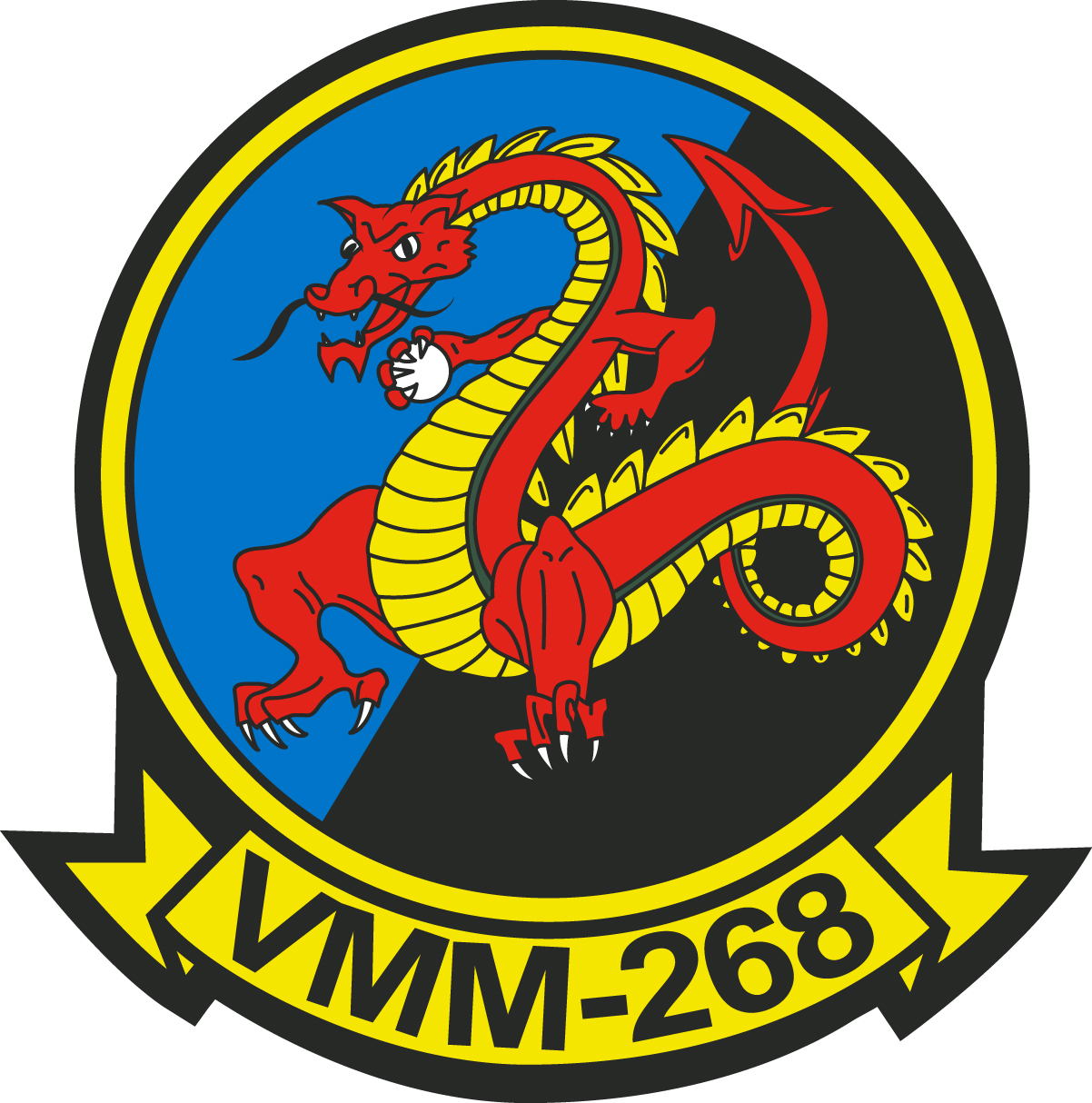
- VMM-268 insignia
- Active: 15 September 1972 – 30 September 1977; 1 March 1979 – present
- Country: United States
- Branch: United States Marine Corps
- Type: Medium Lift Tiltrotor Squadron
- Role: Conduct air operations in support of the Fleet Marine Forces
- Part of: Marine Aircraft Group 24; 1st Marine Aircraft Wing
- Garrison/HQ: Marine Corps Base Hawaii
- Nickname: Red Dragons
- Motto: "Just Real Players"
- Tail Code: YQ
- Mascot: Trixi
- Engagements: Operation Desert Storm; Operation Restore Hope; 2003 invasion of Iraq; Operation Iraqi Freedom; War on terror; Operation Enduring Freedom; Operation Inherent Resolve

Commanders
- Current commander: [https://www.1stmaw.marines.mil/Leaders/Biography/Article/3305586/lieutenant-colonel-john-j-campbell/ LtCol John J. Campbell ]

Marine Medium Tiltrotor Squadron 268 (VMM-268) is a United States Marine Corps helicopter squadron consisting of MV-22 transport. The squadron, known as the "Red Dragons", is based at Marine Corps Base Hawaii, Kaneohe, Hawaii and falls under the command of Marine Aircraft Group 24 (MAG-24) and the 1st Marine Aircraft Wing (1st MAW).

== Mission ==
Provide assault support to the landing force in the ship to shore movement and in subsequent operations ashore.

== History ==
=== Early years ===
Marine Light Helicopter Squadron 268 (HML-268) was activated on 15 September 1972 at Marine Corps Air Station New River, North Carolina. HML-268 was deactivated on 30 September 1977.

Marine Medium Helicopter Squadron 268 (HMM-268) was activated on 1 March 1979 at Marine Corps Air Station Tustin, California. The squadron was designated for medium lift and equipped with CH-46 helicopters. The squadron returned to MCAS Tustin on 31 August 1980. A high tempo of operations was maintained through the 10,000-accident free flight hour milestone, which the squadron attained on 18 September 1981. Additionally, during this period, the Red Dragons were the recipients of the Chief of Naval Operations Safety Award for 1981.

Upon returning to the United States, the squadron was officially designated as the 3rd MAW's "Night Assault Squadron". Within 90 days of designation, the "Night Raiders" of HMM-268 implemented an aggressive Night Vision Goggle (NVG) program. During February 1984 the squadron surpassed the 10,000-hour mishap-free flight hour mark.

Between May 1989 and November 1990 the Red Dragons participated in numerous exercises including MAGTF 89-3 deployed aboard USS Ogden, in support of the Exxon Valdez oil spill cleanup. During this period, HMM-268 passed the 20,000 mishap-free flight hour milestone.

In April 2014 HMM-268 stood down and stood up again on the same day as VMM-268. All the squadron's CH-46E aircraft have been replaced with MV-22 "Ospreys."

=== The Gulf War ===
On 1 December 1990, while assigned as the Aviation Combat Element of the 11th Marine Expeditionary Unit (11th MEU), HMM-268 responded to the Persian Gulf Crisis. Embarked on USS New Orleans and deployed with MAG-50, 5th MEB (SOC), the Red Dragons supported Operation Desert Shield. En route to the Persian Gulf, the Red Dragons completed, for the first time ever, the NVG shipboard carrier qualification syllabus. The Dragons also pioneered and flew the first Low Light Level NVG carrier qualifications. On 14 February 1991, the squadron celebrated its 5-year Class A mishap-free milestone.

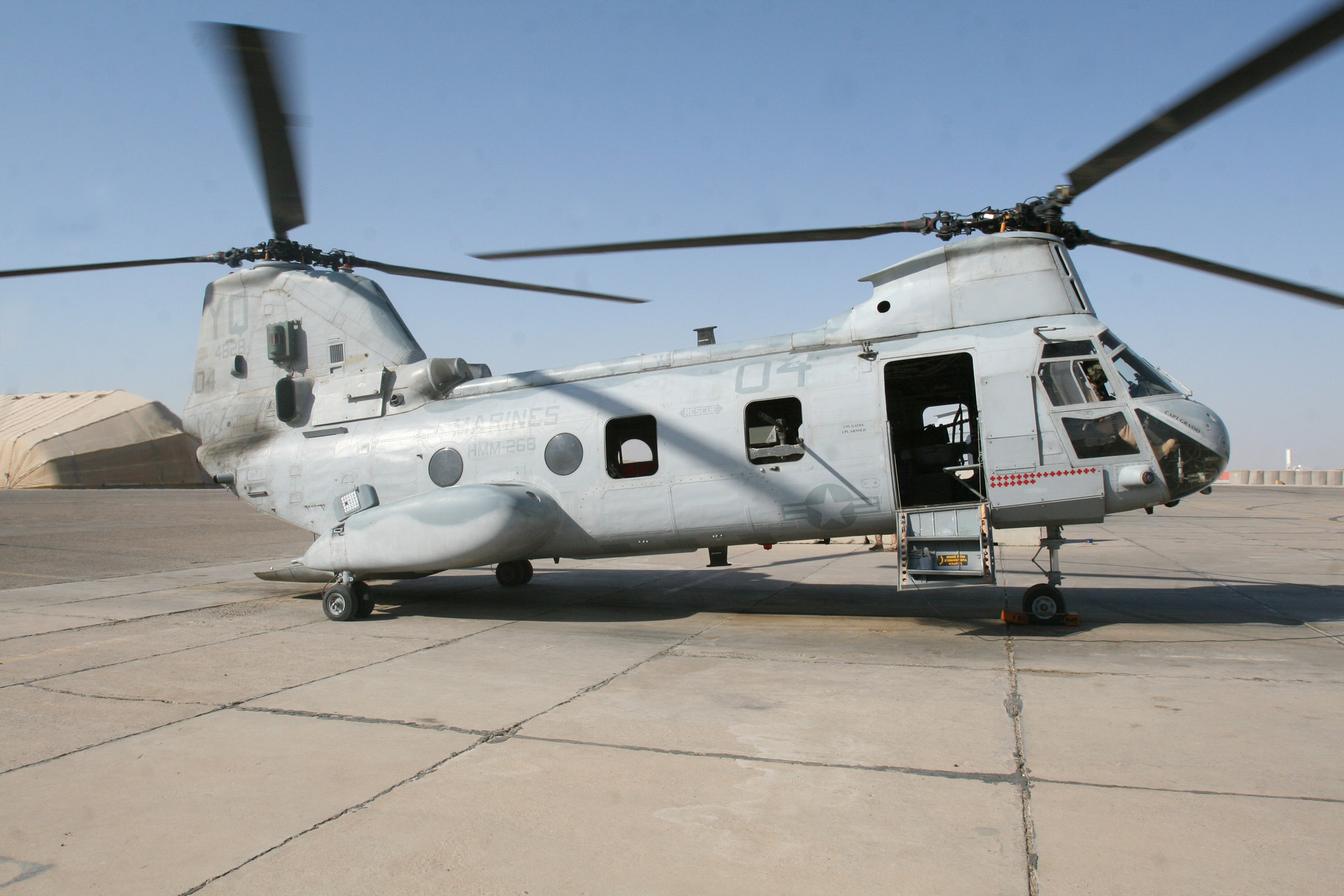
A CH-46E from HMM-268 on the tarmac at Al Taqaddum, Iraq on August 31, 2006.

During Operation Desert Storm, HMM-268 moved ashore and provided combat assault support to 5th MEB, including the "G-Day" tactical insertion of 3rd Battalion, 1st Marines along the Saudi Arabian/Kuwaiti border. The squadron flew over 450 hours in a seven-day period. After conclusion of the conflict, the squadron supported I MEF from Tanajib, Saudi Arabia.

In April 1991, the squadron re-embarked aboard New Orleans, as the ACE for the 11th MEU (SOC) and continued its Southwest Asia deployment. The MEU supported National Command Authority objectives in the Persian Gulf, until returning to the United States in August 1991.

=== The 1990s ===
In September 1993, the Red Dragons again deployed to the Western Pacific and were directed to Somalia to support Operation Restore Hope II, in Mogadishu. HMM-268 supported numerous VIP visits, MEU (SOC) and United Nations humanitarian missions. The Squadron returned to California in March 1994, and in July was designated the Marine Corps Aviation Association's Marine Helicopter Squadron of the year for 1994.

In February 1998, as the ACE for the 11th MEU (SOC), HMM-268 (REIN) was tasked to deploy ahead of schedule in response to Iraq's disregard of United Nations decree. The squadron took part in Operation Southern Watch and Operation Safe Departure, in which over 170 American citizens were evacuated from war torn Eritrea. During this deployment, HMM-268 received its fourth consecutive Chief of Naval Operations Safety Award. The squadron returned from this deployment on 6 August 1998.

The Red Dragons moved from Marine Corps Air Station El Toro to Marine Corps Air Station Camp Pendleton in February 1999, and departed on 14 March 2001 as MAG-39's first Aviation Combat Element (ACE) for the 11th MEU (SOC).

The squadron supported Humanitarian Operations in East Timor lifting several hundred tons of needed goods to the people of East Timor.

=== Global war on terror ===
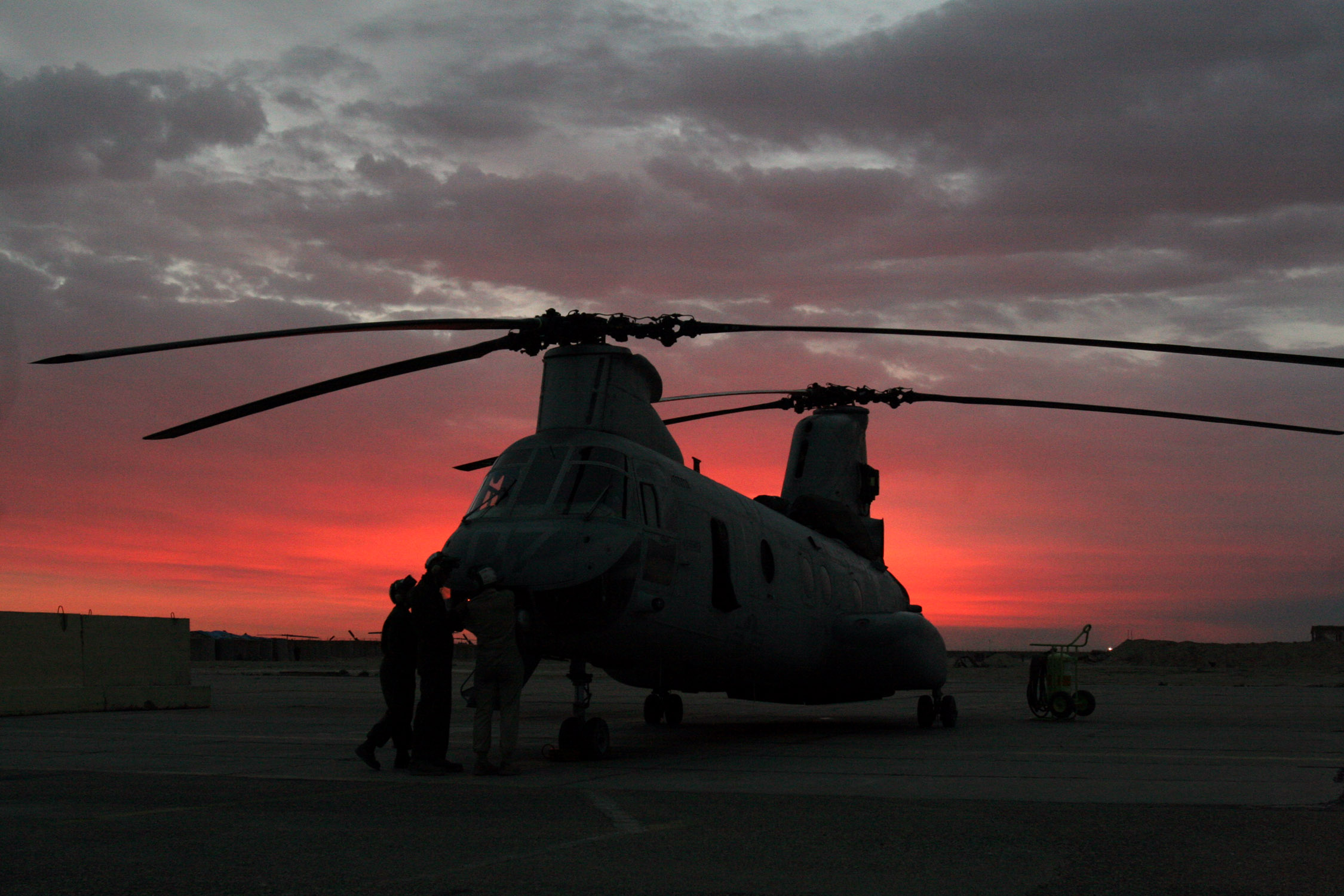
HMM-268 helo on the tarmac at Al Taqaddum, Iraq

In January 2003, HMM-268 began the long process of deployment to Kuwait in support of Operation Iraqi Freedom. The Red Dragons distinguished themselves by their tireless support for combat and Casualty Evacuation CASEVAC operations throughout the area of operations, returning 19 September 2003.

In August 2004, HMM-268 deployed again to Iraq in support of Operation Iraqi Freedom II. For seven months the Red Dragons provided CASEVAC support for I MEF units engaged in combat, returning home in March 2005.

The Red Dragons are the Chief of Naval Operations Safety Award winners for 2004. The award signifies commitment to aviation safety, professionalism, solid leadership, and effective operations and readiness.

The squadron redeployed to Iraq in early 2006, and from 25 February, were responsible for casualty evacuation and assault support in the area around Al Taqaddum Airfield where they were based.

On 28 June 2008, HMM-268 deployed to Naval Air Station Lemoore after California Governor Arnold Schwarzenegger requested military assistance to fight raging wildfires. The helicopters provided medium lift rotary wing support to United States Northern Command and the National Fire Center.

In March 2009 the Squadron again deployed to Iraq in support of 2d MAW (FWD) operations for stabilization of Anbar Provence.

In November 2011, HMM-268(REIN) embarked for its first shipboard deployment in over a decade aboard USS Makin Island and USS New Orleans as the ACE for the 11th Marine Expeditionary Unit. While deployed, the Red Dragons participated in seven Theater Security Cooperation (TSC) exercises in Cambodia, Singapore, Malaysia, Kuwait, Saudi Arabia and Oman, as well as supported several national tasking missions. Upon return from the MEU deployment, HMM-268 was designated to transition from the CH-46E to the MV-22B Osprey. This marked the beginning of a new chapter in the Red Dragons’ history as the squadron continued to maintain readiness while preparing for transition.

=== Operation Inherent Resolve ===
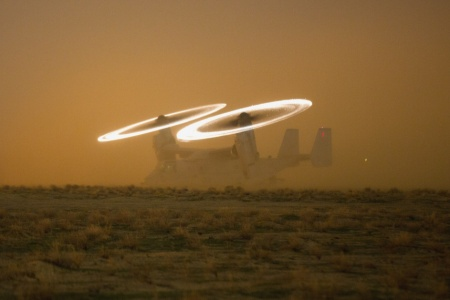
A U.S. Marine Corps MV-22 Osprey assigned to Special Purpose Marine Air-Ground Task Force-Crisis Response-Central Command

VMM-268 deployed to Southwest Asia as part of the Aviation Combat Element of Special Purpose Marine Air-Ground Task Force Crisis Response Central Command 16.1 in the continuing fight against Islamic State in Iraq and the Levant.

== See also ==
- United States Marine Corps Aviation
- Organization of the United States Marine Corps
- List of active United States Marine Corps aircraft squadrons
