= HMH-772 =

Marine Heavy Helicopter Squadron 772
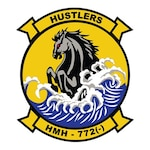
- HMH-772 insignia
- Active: 15 April 1958 - Present
- Country: United States
- Branch: United States Marine Corps
- Type: Marine Heavy Helicopter Squadron
- Role: Assault Support, Aerial Pruning
- Part of: Marine Aircraft Group 49; 4th Marine Aircraft Wing
- Garrison/HQ: Joint Base McGuire-Dix-Lakehurst
- Nickname: "The Hustlers"
- Tail Code: MT
- Anniversaries: 10 November 1775
- Engagements: Operation Fiery Vigil; Operation Iraqi Freedom; Operation Enduring Freedom

Commanders
- Current commander: LtCol Matthew A. Steege

Marine Heavy Helicopter Squadron 772 (HMH-772) is a United States Marine Corps helicopter squadron consisting of CH-53E Super Stallion transport helicopters. The squadron, known as the Flying Armadillos with the Radio Callsign "Hustler", is based at McGuire AFB, New Jersey and falls under the command of Marine Aircraft Group 49 (MAG-49) and the 4th Marine Aircraft Wing (4th MAW).

== Mission ==
Provide the active component a combat-ready force to augment and reinforce regular forces in Major Regional Contingency (MRC) and to provide relief to these forces during times of high tempo operations. Training must be such that this integration is seamless. Additionally, HMH-772 will reach out to the community in which it serves to tell the Marine Corps story, establish a civilian support base, and when so tasked, to provide assistance to the community during emergencies or disaster relief.

== History ==
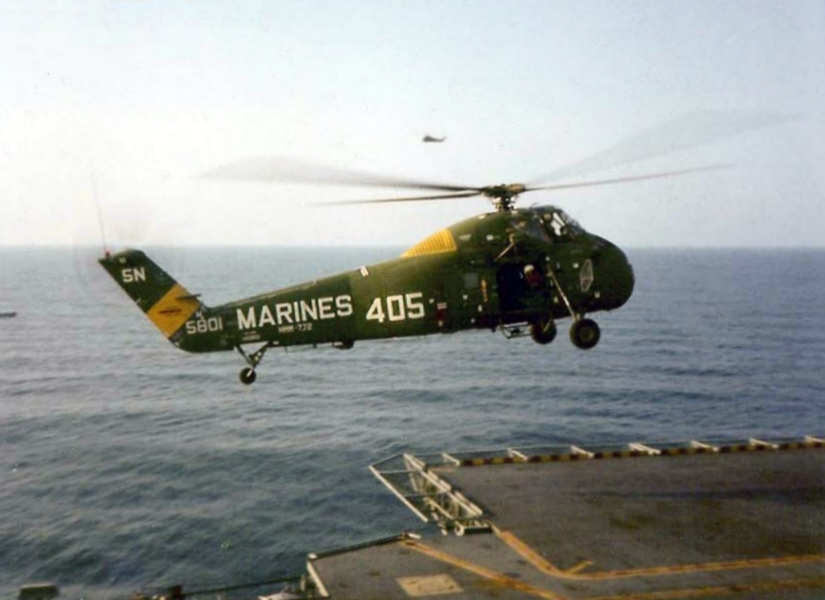
HMM-772 was the last squadron to operate the UH-34D, in 1971.

=== Early years ===
Helicopter Transport Squadron 772 (HMR-772) was activated on 15 April 1958, at the Marine Air Reserve Training Command, Willow Grove, Pennsylvania as part of the United States Marine Corps Reserve. The squadron was redesignated 1 April 1962, as Marine Medium Helicopter Squadron 772 (HMM-772) and reassigned in February 1965 to Marine Aircraft Group 43 under the 4th Marine Aircraft Wing.

=== Vietnam War & the 1980s ===
In 1970 the squadron moved from NAS Willow Grove, PA to NAS Lakehurst, New Jersey. The following year, 1971, HMH-772 transitioned to the more capable CH-53A Sea Stallion helicopter. Redesignated Marine Heavy Helicopter Squadron 772, the squadron returned to NAS Willow Grove in 1972 and joined MAG-49.

In January 1986, the squadron was asked to support the SAR effort following the Space Shuttle Challenger disaster.

=== The Gulf War & the 1990s ===
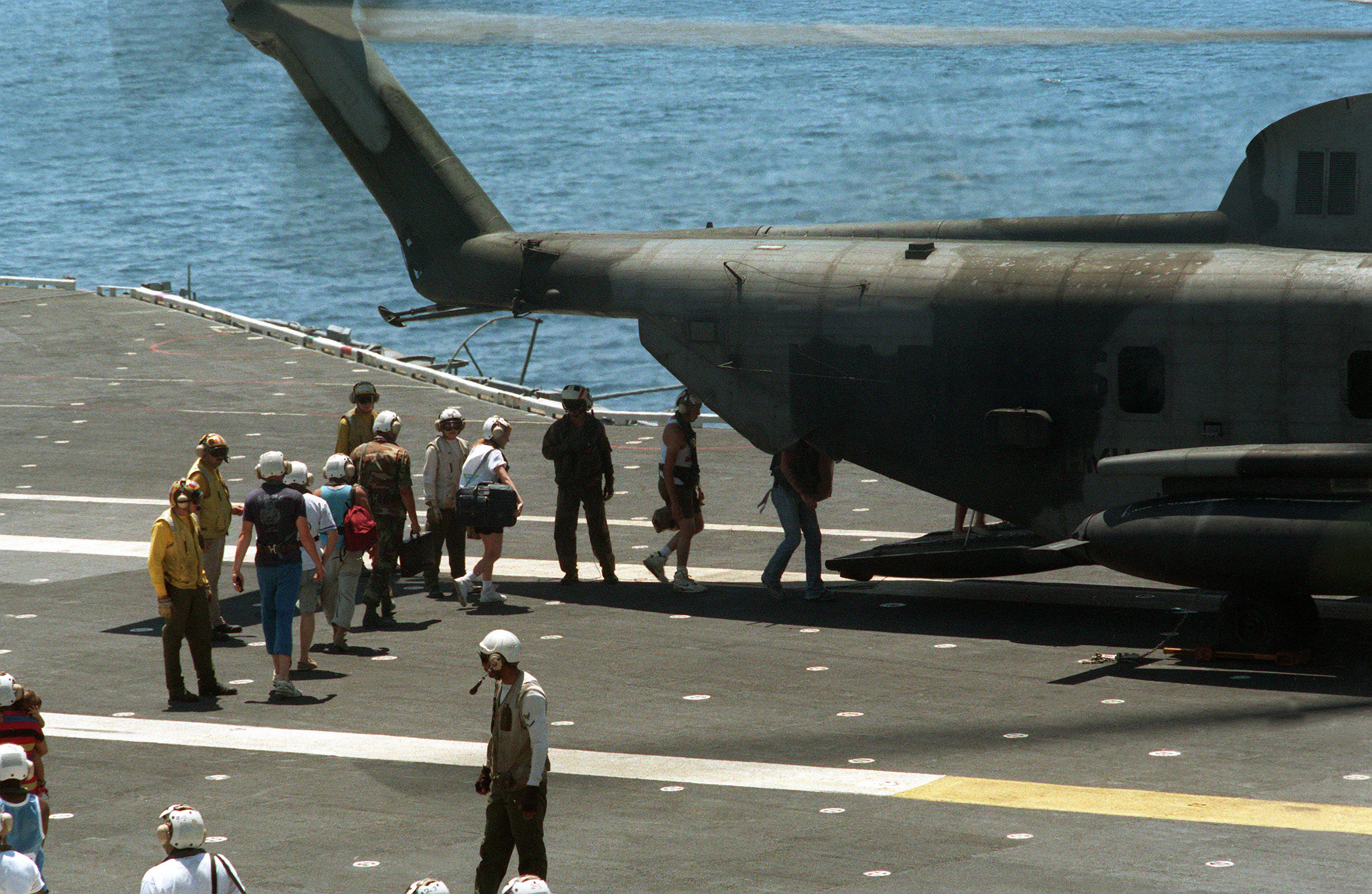
Dependents board a CH-53 on the flight deck of USS Midway (CV-41) during Operation Fiery Vigil

In 1991 the Squadron was mobilized in support of Operation Desert Storm. The squadron aircrew flew fourteen (14) CH-53A aircraft across the country to join the 3rd MAW and awaited further orders to Okinawa, Japan. While in Okinawa with the 1st MAW the Squadron transitioned to the CH-53D aircraft. From Okinawa the squadron embarked aboard the USS Midway (CV-41) and provided support for Operation Fiery Vigil, which was the evacuation of personnel from the Republic of the Philippines after the volcano Mount Pinatubo erupted. During this time, the squadron also provided support for Operation Sea Angel—the humanitarian relief operations in Bangladesh. For these actions, HMH-772 was awarded another Meritorious Unit Commendation. The Squadron returned to CONUS in November 1991, was deactivated and was reassigned back to the 4th MAW.

=== The Global War on Terror ===
After 9/11 HMH-772 was mobilized once again and activated on 27 January 2002, in support of Operation Noble Eagle and Operation Enduring Freedom. Within two weeks of the activation the squadron relocated to MCAS New River, NC, and was assigned to MAG-29 within the 2nd Marine Aircraft Wing. The squadron was given tasking to integrate with the 24th Marine Expeditionary Unit (MEU) Air Combat Element (ACE) HMM-263. At the completion of the workup cycle, HMH-772 had the distinction of being the first reserve squadron to receive the Special Operations Capable (SOC) designation.

While deployed the HMH-772 (Det) provided heavy lift support for Operational Rehearsal Dynamic Response 2002 in Kosovo. After Kosovo the detachment then moved onto Djibouti and for the next 5 months provided support for the Combined Joint Task Force Horn of Africa (CJTF-HOA). After Djibouti, the detachment rejoined the 24th MEU and provided support for Task Force Tarawa and the 1st Marine Expeditionary Force during Operation Iraqi Freedom. The detachment was deployed overseas for 9 months and returned in May 2003.

=== Operation Enduring Freedom ===
On 25 March 2009 HMH-772 (-) was mobilized to deploy to Afghanistan in support of Operation Enduring Freedom. As part of the workup, HMH-772 broke down five CH-53E Super Stallions for Air Force C-5 and C-17 transport to Afghanistan. On 30 April 2009, approximately 100 Marines departed NAS JRB Willow Grove. These Marines joined with HMH-361 (DET) at Kandahar Air Base. The remaining Marines arrived with the five CH-53Es throughout the month of May.

In June 2009, HMH-772 (-) (REIN) part of MAG-40 moved to Camp Leatherneck in the Helmand Province to begin supporting operations in the region. The "Hustlers" took part in Operation Strike of the Sword (Operation Khanjar), the largest movement of Marines Since the Vietnam War. HMH-772 (-) (REIN) was the first unit to airlift the Marine Corps M777A2 Howitzer in combat. The howitzers were lifted from Firebase Fiddler's Green and taken to FOB Golestan. After spending 8 months deployed, the "Hustlers" of HMH-772 (-) returned to NAS JRB Willow Grove, PA in December 2009. They later de-mobilized on 24 March 2010, and continue to provide support to the Fleet Marine Force.

=== Japan UDP ===
In March 2013 HMH-772(-) was mobilized to do the Unit Deployment Program (UDP) and deployed to Okinawa, Japan. They were joined with HMLA-167 out of MCAS New River. Once they arrived in Japan and were reinforced. The unit returned in November 2013 and demobilized that following winter.

== See also ==
- List of United States Marine Corps aircraft squadrons
- United States Marine Corps Aviation
