= VMM-774 =

Marine Medium Tiltrotor Squadron 774
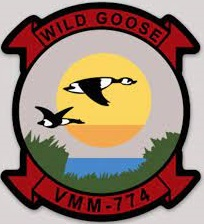
- VMM-774 insignia
- Active: 1958-62; 1969 - present
- Country: United States
- Branch: United States Marine Corps
- Type: Medium Lift Tiltrotor Squadron
- Role: Conduct air operations in support of the Fleet Marine Forces
- Part of: Marine Aircraft Group 49; 4th Marine Aircraft Wing
- Garrison/HQ: Marine Corps Air Station New River
- Nickname: Wild Goose
- Tail Code: MQ
- Engagements: Operation Desert Storm; Operation Iraqi Freedom

Commanders
- Current commander: LtCol Michael Thesing

Marine Medium Tiltrotor Squadron 774 (VMM-774) is a United States Marine Corps medium tiltrotor squadron consisting of V-22 Osprey tiltrotor aircraft. The squadron, known as the "Wild Goose", is a United States Marine Corps Reserve unit based at Marine Corps Air Station New River, North Carolina and falls under the command of Marine Aircraft Group 49 (MAG-49) and the 4th Marine Aircraft Wing (4th MAW).

With the deactivation of training squadron HMMT-164 and re-designation as VMM-164 on 9 April 2015, HMM-774 was the last dedicated CH-46E squadron in the Marine Corps; itself transitioning to the MV-22B Osprey and re-designating as VMM-774 in January 2016.

== Mission ==
Support the MAGTF Commander by providing assault support transport of combat troops, supplies, and equipment, day or night, under all weather conditions during expeditionary, joint or combined operations.

== History ==
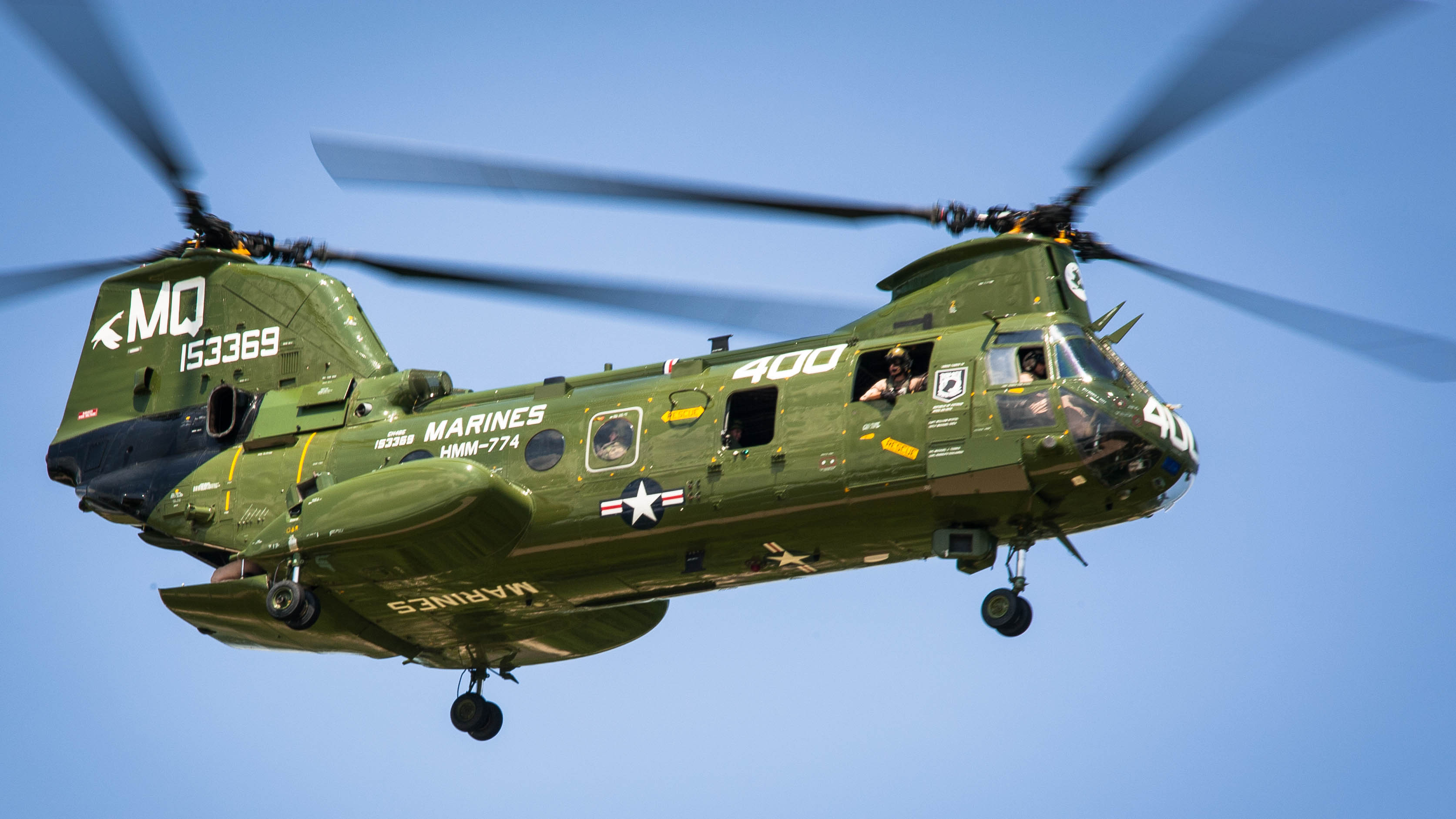
CH-46E 'Phrog' of VMM-774 landing at the Smithsonian Institution National Air and Space Museum’s Steven Udvar-Hazy Center.

Marine Medium Helicopter 774 was activated 5 September 1958, at Naval Air Station New York as Marine Transport Helicopter Squadron 774 (HMR-774). The squadron operated the SH-34G/J Sea Bat helicopter. In April 1962 the squadron was redesignated Marine Medium Helicopter Squadron 774, but was deactivated on 30 September 1962.

HMM-774 was reactivated at Naval Air Station Norfolk (Chambers Field) on 1 July 1969. HMM-774 initially operated UH-34D Sea Horse helicopters. In 1970, the CH-46 replaced the UH-34 and in 1971 the squadron was assigned under the command of the 4th Marine Aircraft Wing. In January 1991, HMM-774 was mobilized as an element of Marine Aircraft Group 26, I Marine Expeditionary Force (I MEF) in support of Operation Desert Shield and Desert Storm. In July 2004, the squadron was mobilized and deployed to Al Asad, Iraq in support of Operation Iraqi Freedom from August 2004 to March 2005 and from September 2005 to March 2006. The squadron was demobilized during July 2006.

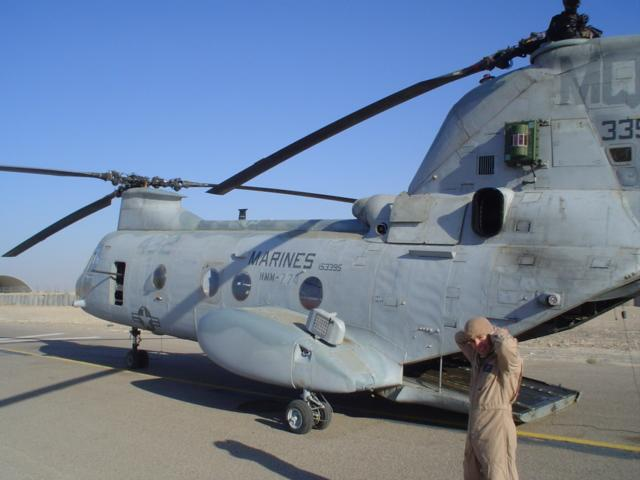
HMM-774 Phrog on the flightline at Al Asad, Iraq in January 2006

On 12 July 2010, HMM-774 embarked aboard USS Iwo Jima (LHD-7) in support of Continuing Promise 2010. During this humanitarian mission, HMM-774 provided support to numerous countries in South America, to include Haiti, Nicaragua, Panama, Colombia, Guatemala, Suriname and Costa Rica. HMM-774 also played a vital role in the aftermath of Hurricane Thomas while deployed to South America and the Caribbean. Shortly after Hurricane Tomas passed through the Bahamas, HMM-774 pulled out of Suriname in short notice and followed the storm to Haiti. Once Hurricane Thomas made landfall, USS Iwo Jima rushed to the scene. Within hours of Hurricane Tomas' destruction, USS Iwo Jima was on the site and HMM-774 was flying aerial recon to assess the situation and decide if further assistance was required.

Following a brief detachment aboard the USS Oak Hill (LSD-51) as a participant in Amphibious Southern Partnership Station 2012, HMM-774 no longer embarked on any further navy vessels. The squadron was present for Integrated Training Exercise (ITX) 4-13, providing a portion of the aviation combat element (ACE), as well as the same exercise, 4-14, the following year at Twentynine Palms, California. Following the return from Twentynine Palms in June 2014, the squadron turned attention to preparing for the upcoming transition to the MV-22B Osprey aircraft. HMM-774 became designated as VMM-774 in January 2016 as the squadron received its first V-22 and later took its first test flight in April 2016. VMM-774 declared Final Operating Capability in April 2018 under command of Lt. Col Eric G. Burns.

VMM-774 was mobilized in 2019, and was deployed to Moron, Spain in September of 2019 in support of a Special Purpose Marine Air Ground Task Force. The squadron returned from that deployment in March of 2020.

In July 2022, VMM-774 completed a move to its current home in Marine Corps Air Station New River North Carolina.

In June of 2023, VMM-774 embarked 3 MV-22B Ospreys aboard the USS New York (LPD-21) for a one month deployment to South America in support of UNITAS 2023, a multi-national amphibious exercise. This was the first time that VMM-774 embarked aircraft aboard US Navy ships since 2012, and the first time the squadron had ever embarked MV-22B Ospreys aboard ship.

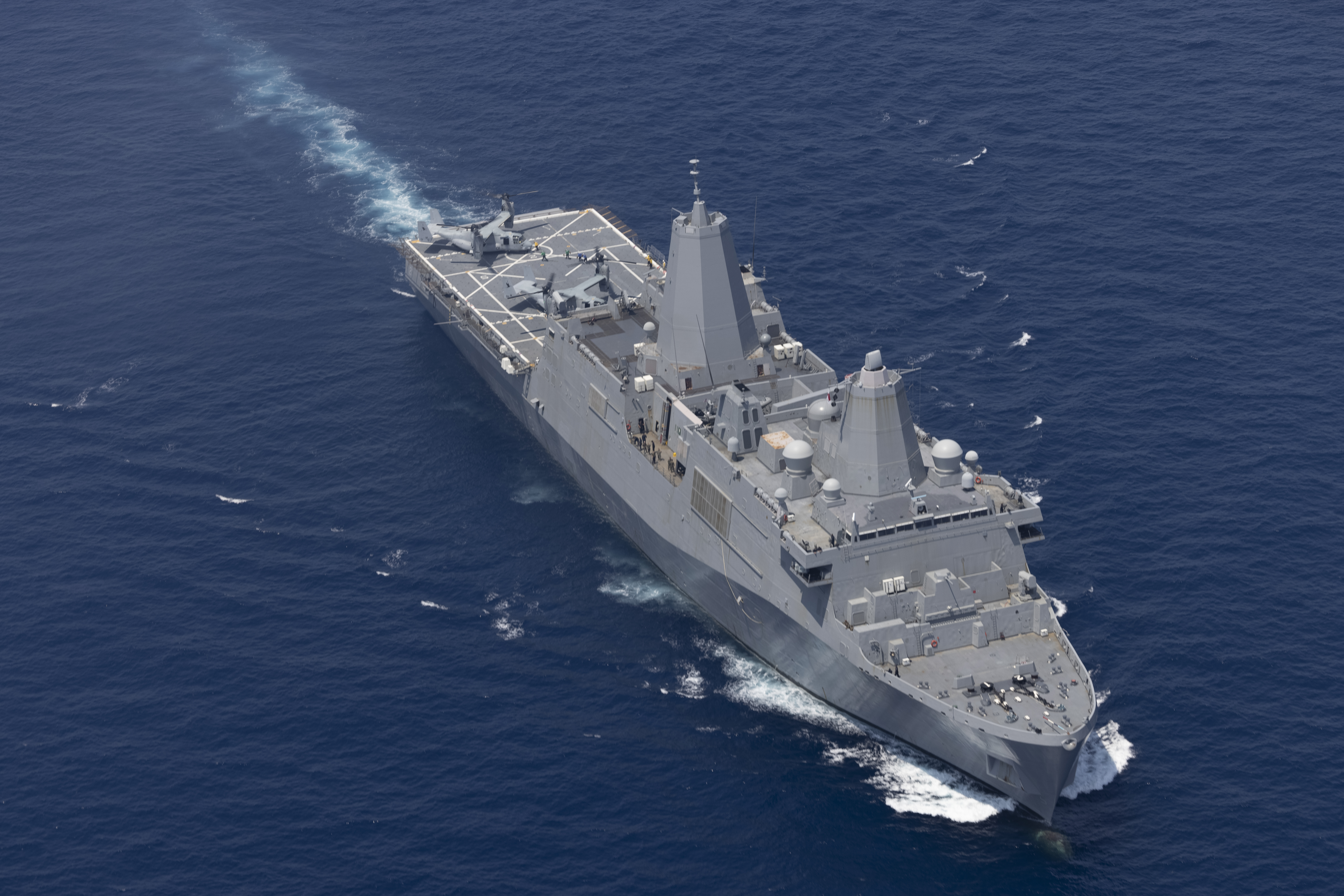
VMM-774 embarked upon the USS New York in 2023.

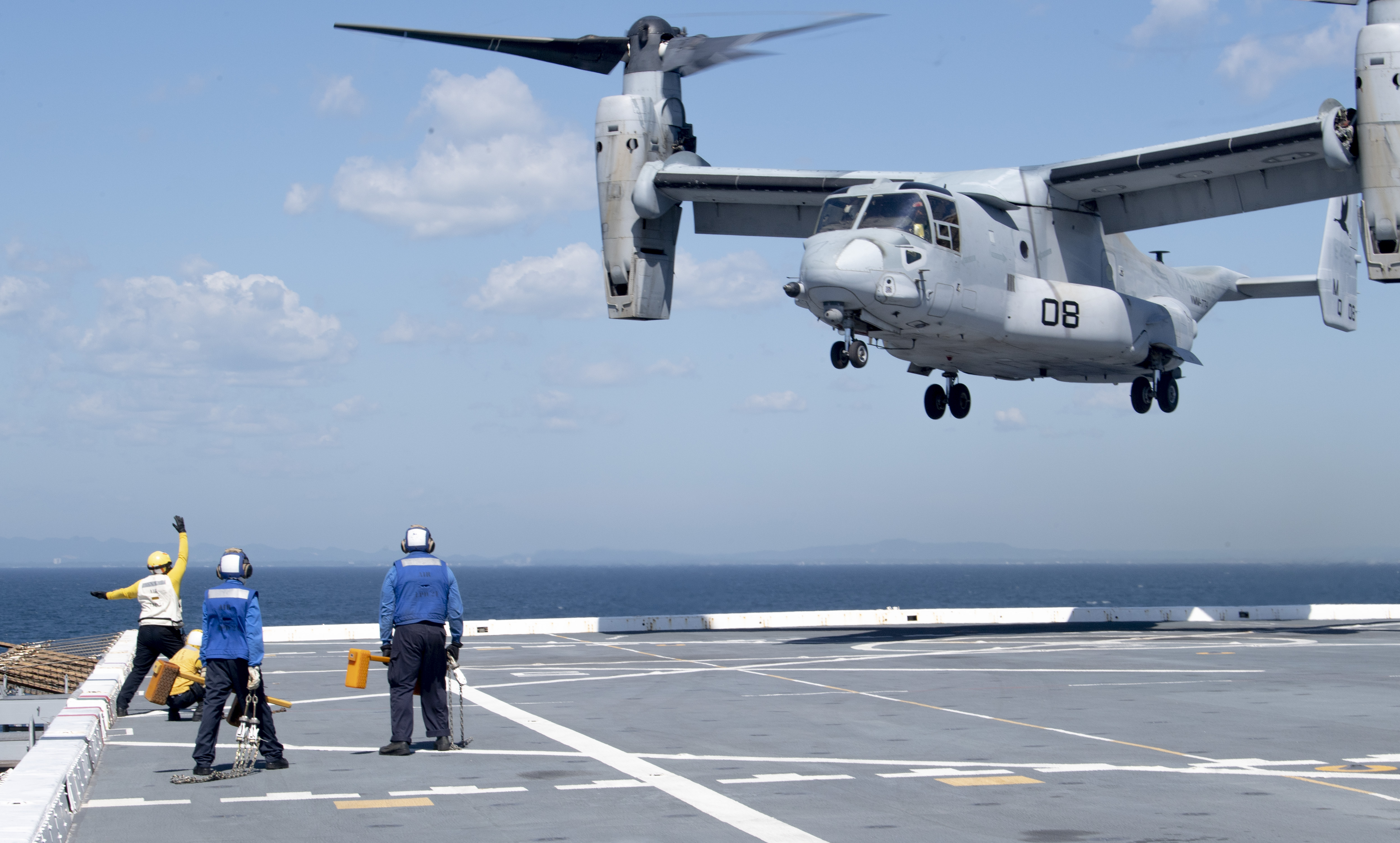
An MV-22B assigned to VMM-774 takes off from the USS New York in July, 2023.

== See also ==
- List of active United States Marine Corps aircraft squadrons
- United States Marine Corps Aviation

== Notes ==
- Reserve Squadron Awarded for 85,000 Mishap-Free Flight Hours, archived on 21 February 2013.
