= HMLA-773 =

Marine Light Attack Helicopter Squadron 773
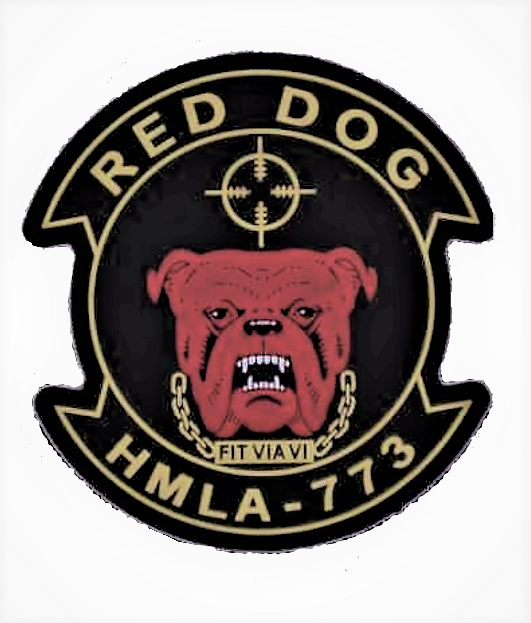
- HMLA-773 Insignia
- Active: September 1958 – 31 August 1962; 15 April 1968 – September 1969; 1 September 1971 – present
- Country: United States
- Branch: United States Marine Corps
- Type: Light attack helicopter squadron
- Role: Close Air Support; Assault Support; Air interdiction Aerial reconnaissance
- Part of: Marine Aircraft Group 49; 4th Marine Aircraft Wing
- Garrison/HQ: Joint Base McGuire-Dix-Lakehurst and Naval Air Station Joint Reserve Base New Orleans
- Nickname: "Red Dogs"
- Mottos: "Fit Via Vi" "Strength is the Way"
- Tail code: MP / MN (MM/WG Det. A)
- Mascot: Red Dogs
- Engagements: Persian Gulf War; Operation Desert Storm; Global War on Terrorism; War in Afghanistan; Iraq War; Operation Iraqi Freedom

Commanders
- Current commander: Lieutenant Colonel Carl Heim, USMC

Marine Light Attack Helicopter Squadron 773 (HMLA-773) is a United States Marine Corps helicopter squadron consisting of Bell AH-1Z Viper attack helicopters and Bell UH-1Y Venom utility helicopters. The squadron is based at Joint Base McGuire–Dix–Lakehurst, NJ and Naval Air Station Joint Reserve Base New Orleans and falls under the command of Marine Aircraft Group 49 (MAG-49) and the 4th Marine Aircraft Wing (4th MAW).

== History ==
The squadron was originally established in September 1958 as Marine Helicopter Transport Squadron 773 (HMR-773) at Naval Air Station Grosse Ile, Michigan and assigned to the Marine Air Reserve Training Command. They operated the Piasecki HUP-2 Retriever which were shared with the Naval Reserve. On 1 April 1962, the squadron was redesignated Marine Medium Helicopter Squadron 773 (HMM-773). Four months later 31 August the squadron was deactivated.

On 15 April 1968, HMM-773 was reactivated at Naval Air Station Los Alamitos and assigned to Marine Aircraft Group 46 of the 4th Marine Aircraft Wing. The squadron's personnel and aircraft, HUS-1 Sea Horses, came from sister squadron HMM-764. HMM-773's existence was short-lived; the squadron deactivated in September 1969.

On 1 September 1971, Marine Attack Helicopter Squadron 773 (HMA-773) was reactivated at Marine Corps Air Facility Santa Ana. The squadron was assigned AH-1G Cobras, many of which had seen action with Marine squadrons in Vietnam. HMA-773 relocated to NAS Atlanta, Georgia during June 1976, absorbing the personnel of HML-765 which had just been deactivated. In late 1978, HMA-773 transitioned to the twin-engine AH-1J Sea Cobra which they operated for the next fourteen years.

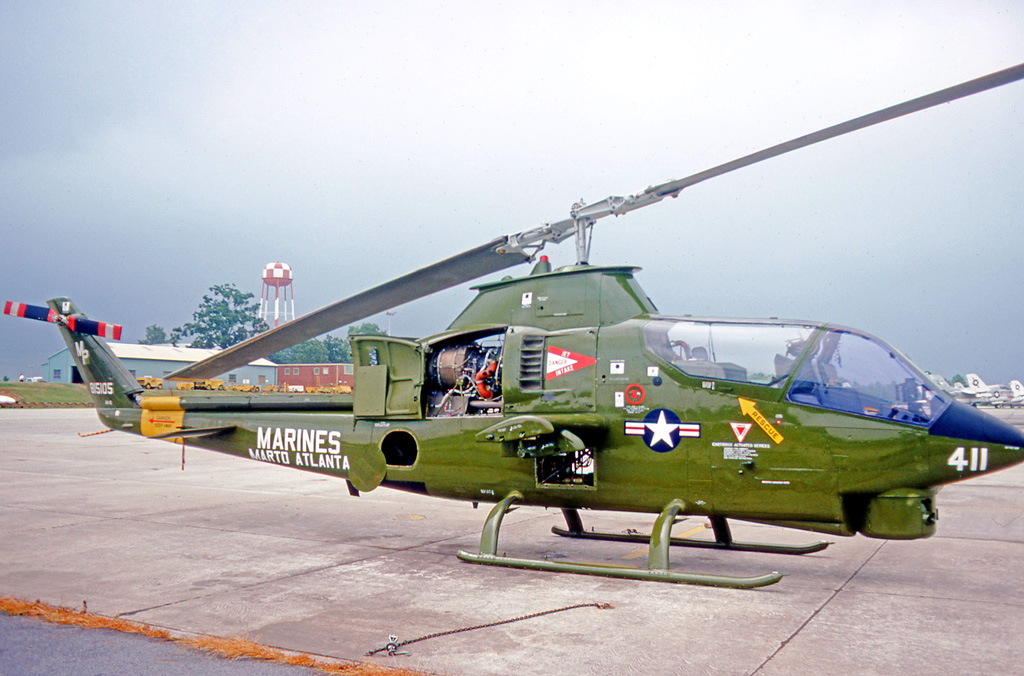
Bell AH-1G Cobra of HMA-773 squadron at NAS Atlanta in 1976

In November 1990, HMA-773 was the first reserve helicopter squadron to be activated and deployed to the Persian Gulf in support of Operation Desert Shield and Operation Desert Storm. While embarked aboard the USS New Orleans and USS Tripoli, the squadron distinguished itself with minesweeping escort and combat missions during the war. In recognition of their exemplary performance during combat HMA-773 received the Navy Unit Commendation.

In the fall of 1992, the squadron received eight, state of the art AH-1W SuperCobras. In November 1993, HMA-773 began receiving UH-1Ns and personnel from other disestablished units. In October 1994, HMA-773 reorganized and re-equipped with the addition of the UH-1N utility helicopter, pilots, and personnel from HML-776, NAS Glenview, Illinois. Having re-designated as a Marine Light Attack Helicopter Squadron 773, the squadron now mirrored the active-duty HMLA structure and enabled rapid total force integration for current and future combat and contingency operations.

Since reorganizing, the "Red Dogs" of HMLA-773 have deployed on numerous counter-narcotics operations throughout the United States, the Caribbean, and the West Indies. In May 1995 the Squadron deployed to the island nation of Antigua for the first in a series of "Weed eater" marijuana destruction missions. They have further developed their eradication tactics on the islands of St. Kitts-Nevis, St. Lucia, Trinidad and Tobago, Grenada, and Nassau, Bahamas. HMLA-773 counter-narcotics missions in the United States have included joint operations with the Army, Coast Guard and several US Law Enforcement Agencies in Kingsville, Texas, El Paso, Texas, Naco, Arizona, Palm Beach, Florida, and El Centro, California. In the space of two years, the Red Dogs aided in the destruction of over $20 billion worth of illegal narcotics.

=== Global war on terrorism ===
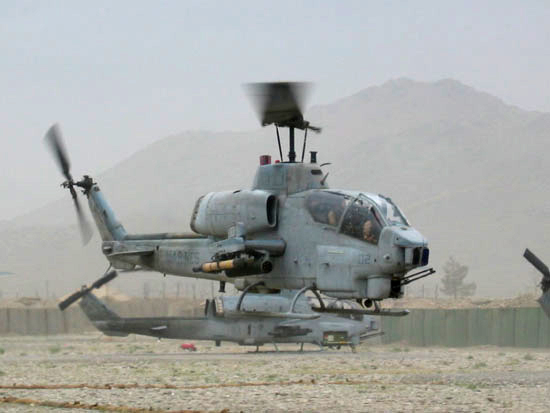
HMLA 773 Cobras in Afghanistan

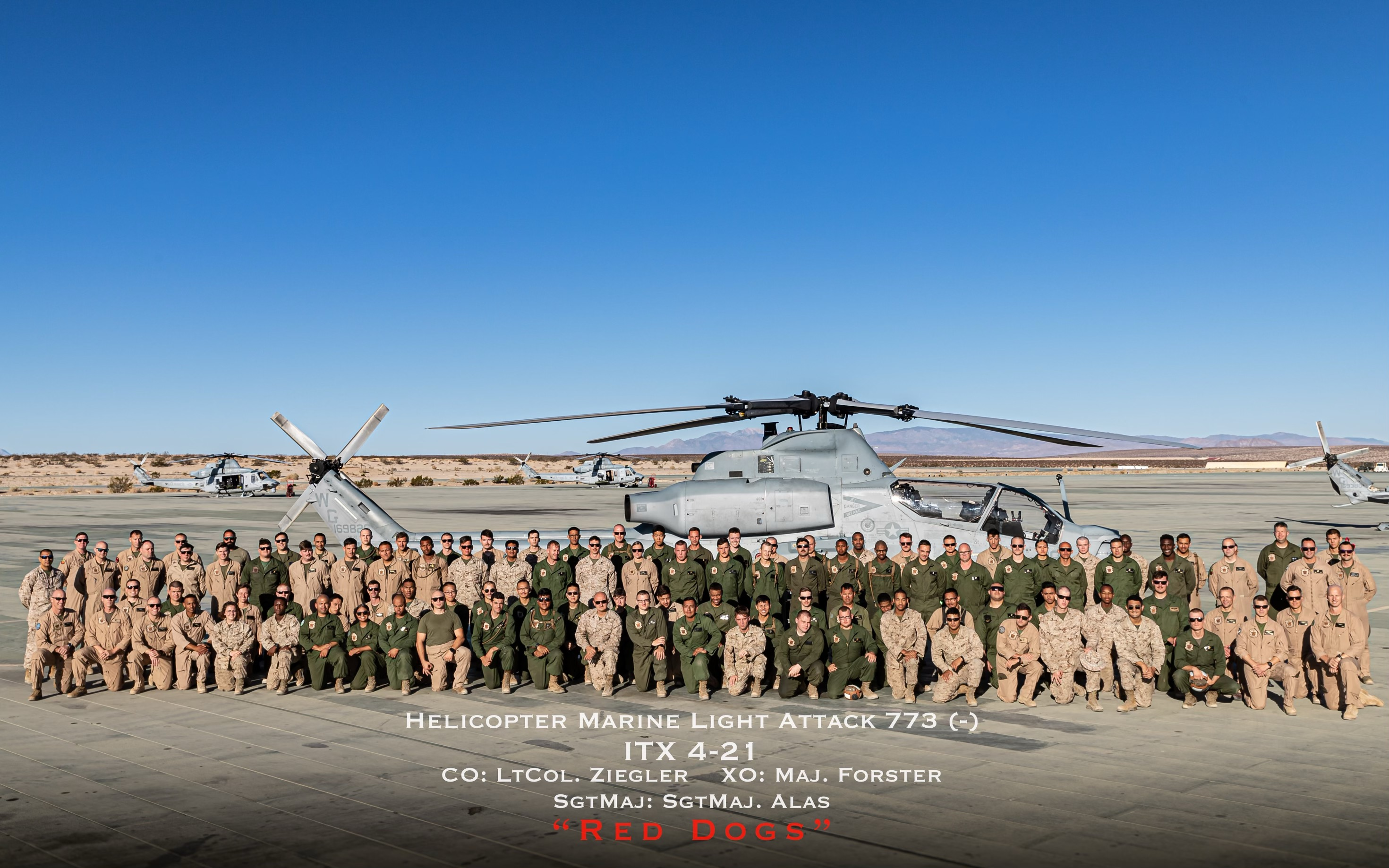
HMLA 773 ITX 4-21

Following the September 11 attacks, HMLA-773 prepared for participation in the Global War on Terrorism when it was activated in October 2003 and deployed to Bagram, Afghanistan, for further deployment along the international border between Afghanistan and Pakistan. Since 3 Oct, the Red Dogs have been flying combat missions in support of Combined Joint Task Force 180 and Combined Joint Task Force 76. In addition, the Red Dogs have instituted Operation Red Dog, in which the Marines and Sailors of the unit gather school supplies and other humanitarian items and distribute them to the local population.

The squadron was the subject of exclusive documentaries for the Military Channel and ABC Nightline in Afghanistan during its deployment there. This film, "Task Force Red Dog" captured the squadron at war in a way that no other documentaries had done on helicopters in recent memory. Filmmakers Richard Mackenzie and William Skinner spent six months with the Marines of HMLA-773 at the front line in Afghanistan.

After 18 months of continuous combat operations in Afghanistan, the squadron deployed to Camp Pendleton, CA in support of Revised Combined Arms Exercise (RCAX) to assist in the preparation of ground forces for duty in Iraq and Afghanistan. During this time, Hurricane Katrina struck New Orleans, the home to many of the Marines of HMLA-773. The squadron was one of the first military units to arrive in the city for rescue and relief operations.

Beginning in October 2005, the reserve Marines of HMLA-773 began to demobilize and return to civilian life. And in February 2006, HMLA-773 returned to the status of drilling reserve unit.

In September 2007, HMLA-773 replaced HMLA-269 in Al Asad Air Base in Iraq for a 6 to 7-month deployment in support of Operation Iraqi Freedom.

On 30 July 2008, a ground breaking ceremony was held at Robins Air Force Base for the 40,000-square-foot (3,700 m^{2}) hangar that is being constructed for HMLA-773. The hangar was completed in early 2010 and the squadron officially moved on 1 July 2010 during a change of command ceremony.

In 2009, HMLA-773(-), HMLA-773 Det A and HMLA-773 Det B, separated to three locations yet come together to form one complete HMLA squadron that was capable of fulfilling any assigned HMLA mission in the Marine Corps. The current squadron organization is structured to maintain 1/3 of the squadron at Naval Air Station Joint Reserve Base New Orleans, LA (Det A) and 2/3 of the squadron at Joint Base McGuire-Dix-Lakehurst, New Jersey.

Due to re-organization within Marine aviation, the squadron headquarters relocated to Joint Base MDL on 1 July 2016 with Detachment A remaining at NASJRB New Orleans.

The Bell AH-1W SuperCobra was retired on 14 October 2020 and the squadron transitioned to the Bell AH-1Z Viper.

== See also ==
- List of United States Marine Corps aircraft squadrons
- United States Marine Corps Aviation
