= Joint Base McGuire–Dix–Lakehurst =

Military base in New Jersey, United States

- Near Wrightstown and Lakehurst, New Jersey in the United States
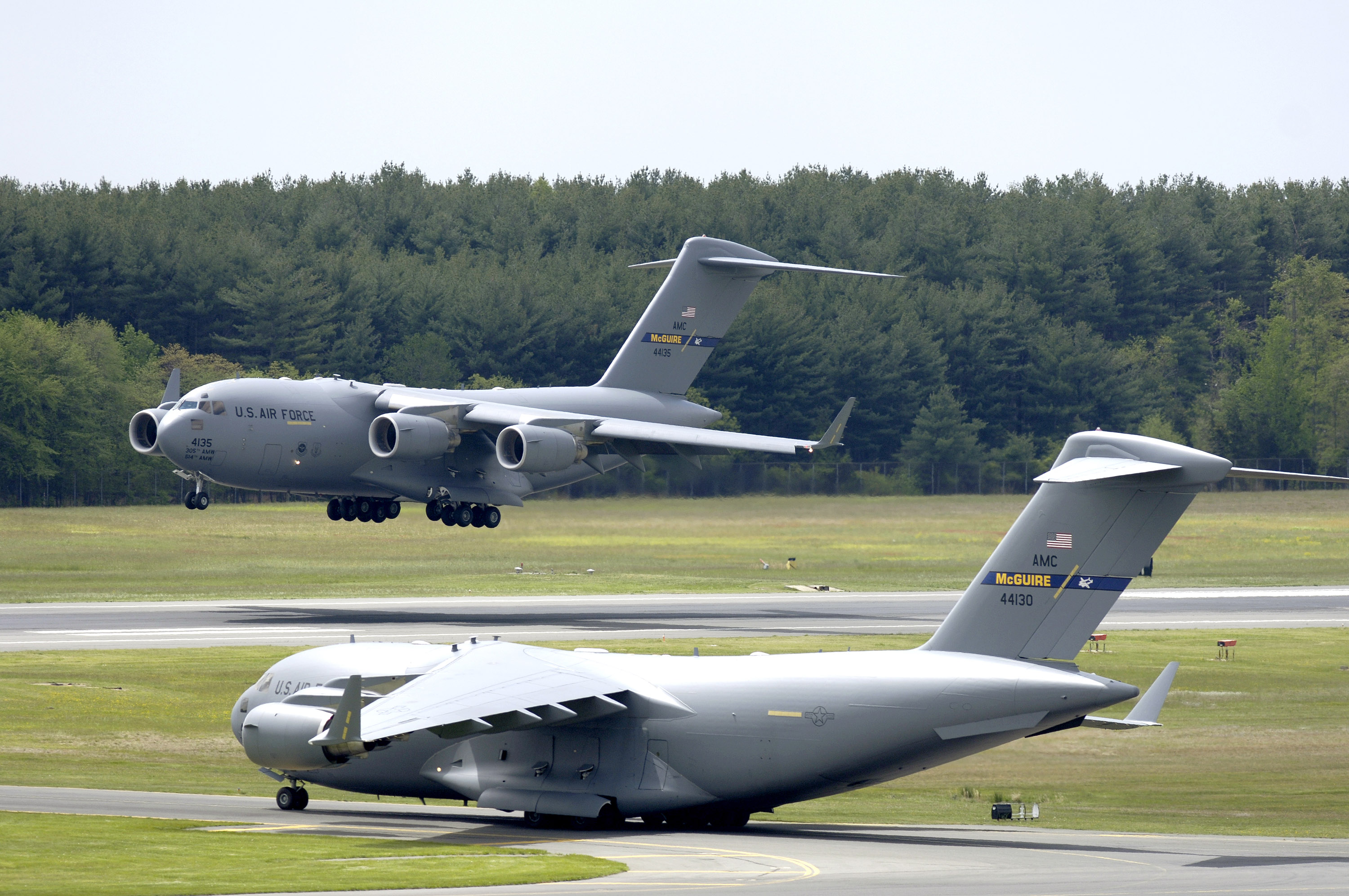
- A C-17A Globemaster III from the 305th Air Mobility Wing performs touch and go landings while another C-17A prepares for take-off at JB McGuire-Dix-Lakehurst.

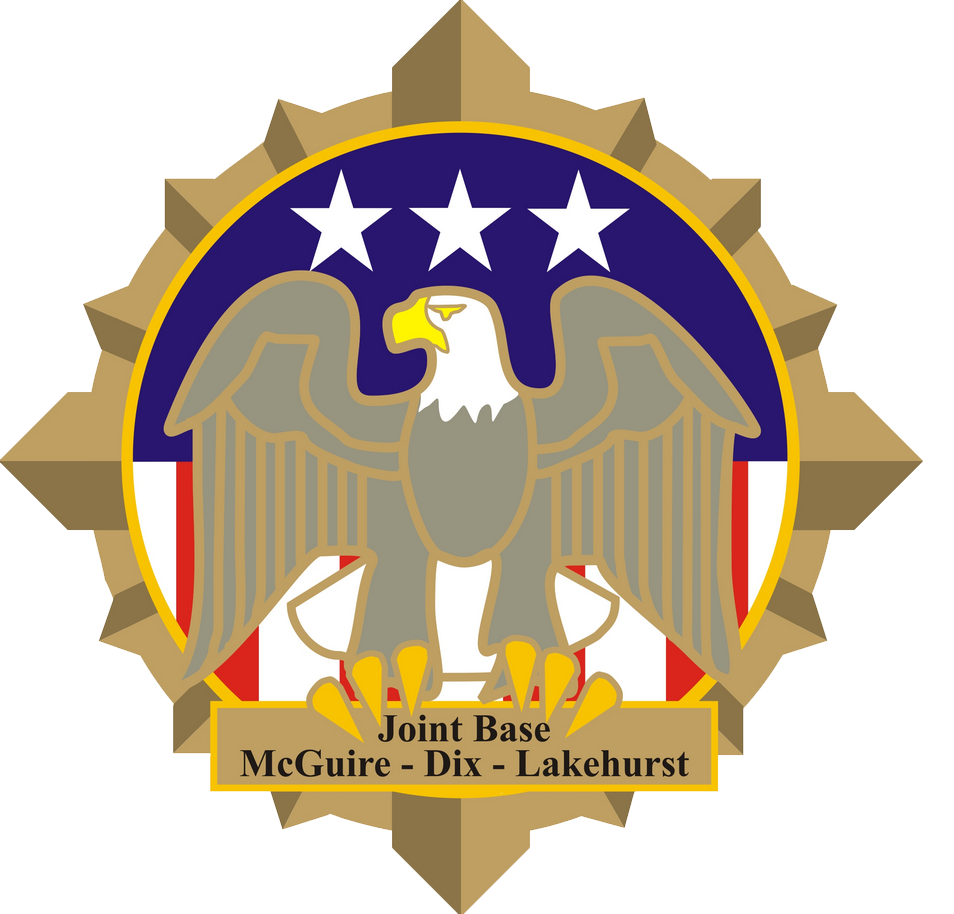

Site information
- Type: US military Joint Base
- Owner: Department of Defense
- Operator: US Air Force
- Controlled by: Air Mobility Command (AMC)
- Condition: Operational
- Website: www.jbmdl.jb.mil

Location
- Location within Burlington County, New Jersey Location within New Jersey Location within the United States
- Coordinates: 40°00′56″N 074°35′30″W (Air Base); 40°01′09″N 74°31′22″W (Army Base); 40°02′00″N 074°21′13″W (Naval Station)

Site history
- Built: 1916 (as Camp Kendrick); 1917 (as Camp Dix); 1937 (as Fort Dix Airport)
- In use: 2009 – present (as Joint Base)

Garrison information
- Current commander: Joint Base Commander Col. Michael D. Stefanovic (USAF) Joint Base Deputy Commander (Dix) COL Clay M. Huffman (USA) Joint Base Deputy Commander (Lakehurst) CAPT James Howell (USN)
- Garrison: 87th Air Base Wing (Host); Army Support Activity Dix; Naval Support Activity Lakehurst

Airfield information
- Identifiers: IATA: WRI, ICAO: KWRI, FAA LID: WRI, WMO: 724096
- Elevation: 42.9 metres (141 ft) AMSL
Runways
| Direction | Length and surface |
|---|---|
| 06/24 | 3,052.2 metres (10,014 ft) |
| 18/36 | 2,172 metres (7,126 ft) |
- Other Facilities: See Lakehurst Maxfield Field for its airfield data.

Joint Base McGuire–Dix–Lakehurst (JB MDL) is a United States military facility located 18 miles (29 km) southeast of Trenton, New Jersey. The base is the only tri-service base in the United States Department of Defense and includes units from all six armed forces branches.

The facility is an amalgamation of the United States Air Force's McGuire Air Force Base, the United States Army's Fort Dix and the United States Navy's Naval Air Engineering Station Lakehurst, which were merged on 1 October 2009.

It was established in accordance with congressional legislation implementing the recommendations of the 2005 Base Realignment and Closure Commission. The legislation ordered the consolidation of the three facilities which were adjoining, but separate military installations, into a single joint base, one of 12 formed in the United States as a result of the law.

The current installation commander is Air Force Colonel Michael D. Stefanovic. The ASA Fort Dix commander and the NSA Lakehurst Commanding Officer both serve as deputy joint base commanders. Under the joint base agreement, their respective component commands remain independent and are not subordinate to the joint base Air Force commander.

== Overview ==
The contiguous 42,000 acres (17,000 ha) of JB MDL (65+ square miles) are home to more than 80 mission partners and 40 mission commanders providing a wide range of combat capability. The base spans more than 20 miles (32 km), from east to west. It is situated in the two largest counties in New Jersey, Burlington and Ocean, and includes portions of eight municipalities: the borough of Wrightstown and the townships of New Hanover, North Hanover, Pemberton, and Springfield, in Burlington County, and the townships of Jackson, Manchester, and Plumsted in Ocean County. The 87th Air Base Wing provides installation management support for 3,933 facilities with an approximate value of $9.3 billion in physical infrastructure. More than 44,000 airmen, soldiers, sailors, marines, Coast Guardsmen, civilians, and their family members live and work on and around JB MDL, which has an economic impact on the state of New Jersey.

== McGuire/McGuire AFB ==
See: McGuire Air Force Base for additional information and history.

The base originated in 1941 as Fort Dix Army Air Force Base. Closed briefly after World War II, it reopened in 1948 as McGuire Air Force Base. The base was named after Major Thomas B. McGuire, Jr., Medal of Honor recipient, and the second leading ace in American history.

McGuire grew famous as the Air Force's "Gateway to the East", when its core mission became global mobility in 1945. In 1992, it became part of the newly reorganized Air Mobility Command.

The 305th Air Mobility Wing served as the host wing from October 1994 to March 2009, when the newly activated 87th Air Base Wing assumed installation command. The 305th, along with the 108th Air Wing (NJANG), 621st Contingency Response Wing, and the 514th Air Mobility Wing (AFRC), has supported every major type of air mobility mission over the past 15 years.

=== McGuire organizations ===
- 87th Air Base Wing (Host organization for JB MDL)
- 305th Air Mobility Wing (C-17 Airlift, KC-46 Pegasus Air Refueling)
- 621st Contingency Response Wing (Rapid Response unit of Air Mobility Command)
- 514th Airlift Wing (C-17 Airlift) (Air Force Reserve Command)
- 108th Wing (KC-46 Pegasus Air Refueling, C-32B) (New Jersey Air National Guard)
- 314th Recruiting Squadron (Air Force Recruiting Service)
- HQ New Jersey Wing, Civil Air Patrol
- Detachment 1, 373rd Training Squadron
- Air Mobility Command Test and Evaluation Squadron [AMC TES]

== Dix ==
See: Fort Dix for additional information and history.

The facility originated in 1917 as Camp Dix, named in honor of Major General John Adams Dix, a veteran of the War of 1812 and the Civil War, and a former United States Senator, Secretary of the Treasury and Governor of New York. It was renamed Fort Dix in 1939.

Dix has a history of mobilizing, training and demobilizing Soldiers from as early as World War I through the present day. In 1978, the first female recruits entered basic training at Fort Dix. In 1991, Dix trained Kuwaiti civilians in basic military skills so they could take part in their country's liberation.

Dix ended its active Army training mission in 1988 due to Base Realignment and Closure Commission recommendations. It began a new mission of mobilizing, deploying and demobilizing Soldiers and providing training areas for Army Reserve and Army National Guard Soldiers.

In 1994, the United States Air Force Expeditionary Center was established as the Air Mobility Warfare Center on Dix.

=== Fort Dix organizations ===
- Army Support Activity
- Marine Aircraft Group 49 (MAG-49), Marine Air Reserve
- Marine Heavy Helicopter Squadron 772 (HMH-772), Marine Air Reserve
- Marine Light Attack Helicopter Squadron 773 (HMLA-773), Marine Air Reserve
- 99th Regional Support Command, U.S. Army Reserve
- 404th Civil Affairs Battalion (Airborne), U.S. Army Reserve
- 2d Brigade, 75th Innovation Command, U.S. Army Reserve
- U.S. Coast Guard Atlantic Strike Team
- U.S. Air Force Expeditionary Center, Air Mobility Command
- Military Entrance Processing Station (MEPS) Fort Dix
- NCO Academy Fort Dix, U.S. Army Reserve
- Navy Reserve Center Fort Dix, Navy Reserve Forces Command
- 174th Infantry Brigade, U.S. Army Reserve
- Fleet Logistics Support Squadron SIX FOUR (VR-64), Naval Air Force Reserve
- 244th Aviation Brigade, Army Reserve Aviation Command
- Battery G, 3rd Battalion, 14th Marine Regiment, U.S. Marine Corps Reserve
- Joint Force Headquarters (JFHQ), New Jersey Army National Guard (NJARNG)
- NJARNG Observer Coach/Trainer Operations Group

== Lakehurst ==
See: Naval Air Engineering Station Lakehurst for additional information and history.

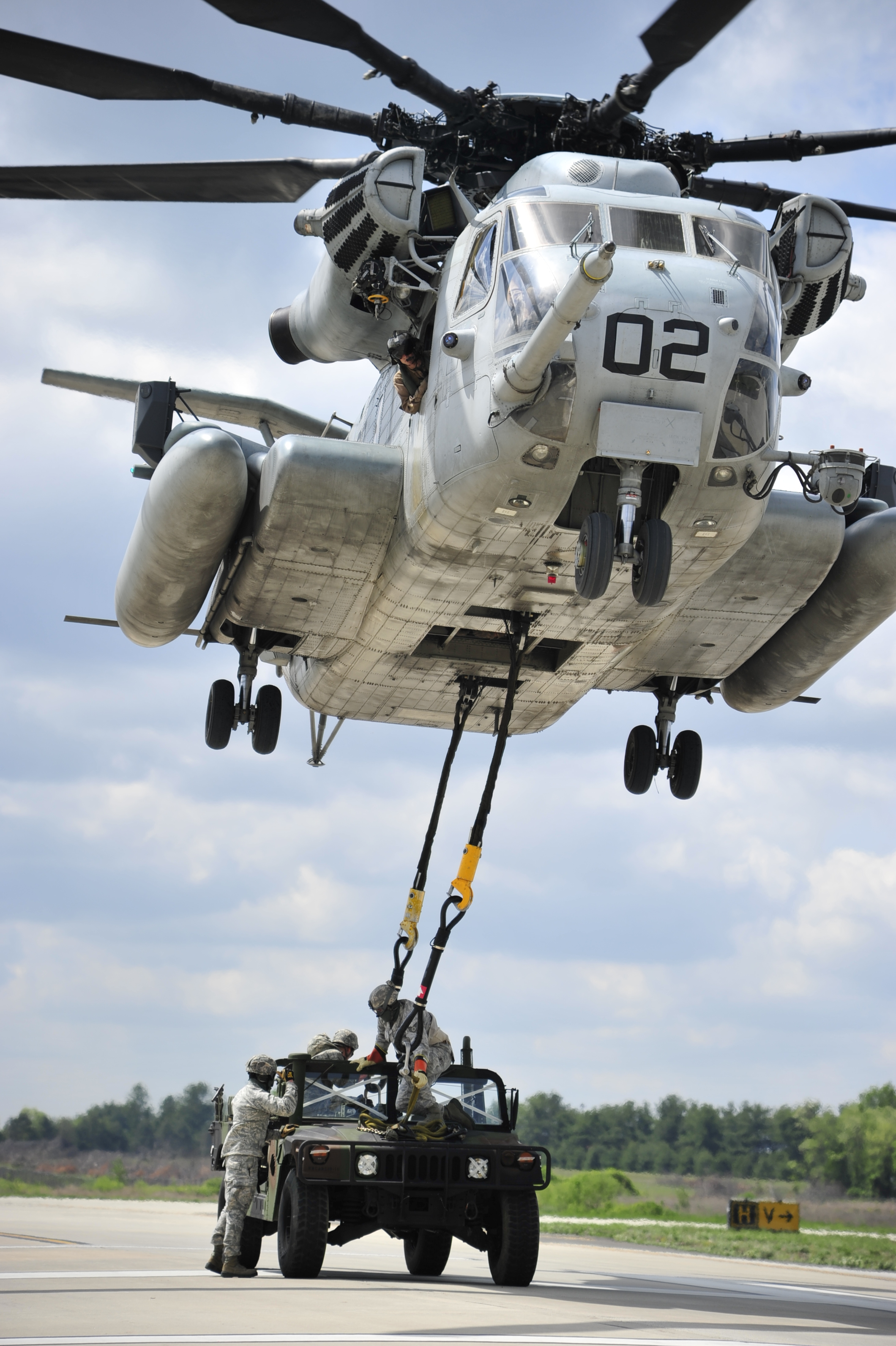
A CH-53E Super Stallion slingloads a Humvee.

Lakehurst history begins as a munitions-testing site for the Imperial Russian Army in 1916. It was then gained by the United States Army as Camp Kendrick during World War I. The United States Navy purchased the property in 1921 for use as an airship station and renamed it Naval Air Station Lakehurst.

The Navy's lighter-than-air program was conducted at Lakehurst through the 1930s. It was the site of the 1937 LZ 129 Hindenburg airship disaster. During World War II, anti-submarine patrol blimps were operated from Lakehurst. Since the 1950s, Aviation Boatswain's Mates have been trained at Lakehurst to operate catapults and arresting systems on aircraft carriers. Lakehurst conducts the unique mission of supporting and developing the Aircraft Launch and Recovery Equipment and Support Equipment for naval aviation. The Electromagnetic Aircraft Launch System and the Advanced Arresting Gear system that will replace the existing steam catapults and the Mk-7 arresting gear are being developed and tested at Lakehurst at full-scale shipboard representative test facilities here.

=== Lakehurst organizations ===
- NAVAIR
- NAWCAD
- Center for Naval Aviation Technical Training Detachment Lakehurst (CNATT DET Lakehurst)
- Naval Mobile Construction Battalion 21 (NMCB 21)
- Mid-Atlantic Recruiting Battalion, 1st U.S. Army Recruiting Brigade
- EAGLE FLAG
- 1st Battalion (Assault), 150th Aviation Regiment, NJARNG

== History ==
The Hindenburg disaster took place on Thursday, 6 May 1937, as the German passenger airship LZ 129 Hindenburg caught fire and was destroyed during its attempt to dock with its mooring mast at the then-Naval Air Station Lakehurst.

== Education ==
The U.S. Census Bureau lists "Joint Base McGuire-Dix-Lakehurst" in Burlington County as having its own school district. Students attend area school district public schools, as the Department of Defense Education Activity (DoDEA) does not operate any schools on the joint base. Students in Lakehurst are zoned to Lakehurst School District and Manchester Township High School (of Manchester Township School District). Students on McGuire and Dix may attend one of the following, with all siblings in a family taking the same choice: North Hanover Township School District (Pre-Kindergarten through grade 6), Northern Burlington County Regional School District (grades 7-12), and Pemberton Township School District (K-12).
