= Marine Aviation Logistics Squadron 13 =

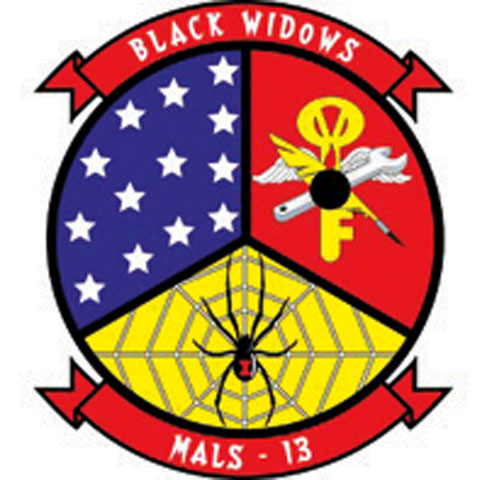
- MALS-13 Insignia
- Active: 1 March 1942 – 30 November 1945; 15 March 1951 – present
- Country: United States
- Allegiance: United States of America
- Branch: United States Marine Corps
- Type: Logistics
- Role: Aviation logistics support
- Part of: Marine Aircraft Group 13; 3rd Marine Aircraft Wing
- Garrison/HQ: Marine Corps Air Station Yuma
- Nicknames: Black Widows; Outlaws (formerly)
- Engagements: World War II; Vietnam War; Operation Desert Storm; Operation Enduring Freedom; Operation Iraqi Freedom

Commanders
- Current commander: LtCol Brandon L. Kneemiller

Marine Aviation Logistics Squadron 13 (MALS-13) is an aviation logistics support unit of the United States Marine Corps. Known as the "Black Widows", it is currently based at Marine Corps Air Station Yuma, as part of Marine Aircraft Group 13 and the 3rd Marine Aircraft Wing.

== Mission statement ==
Provide aviation ordnance, maintenance and logistics support, guidance and direction to Marine Aircraft Group (MAG) squadrons; as well as logistics support for navy funded equipment in the supporting Marine Wing Support Squadron (MWSS), Marine Air Control Squadron and Marine Aircraft Wing/mobile calibration complex.

== Squadron organization ==
- Aviation logistics Information Maintenance Support Department (ALIMSD)
- Headquarters
- Aviation Supply department
- Aircraft Maintenance department
- Avionics division
- Aviation Ordnance Department

== History ==
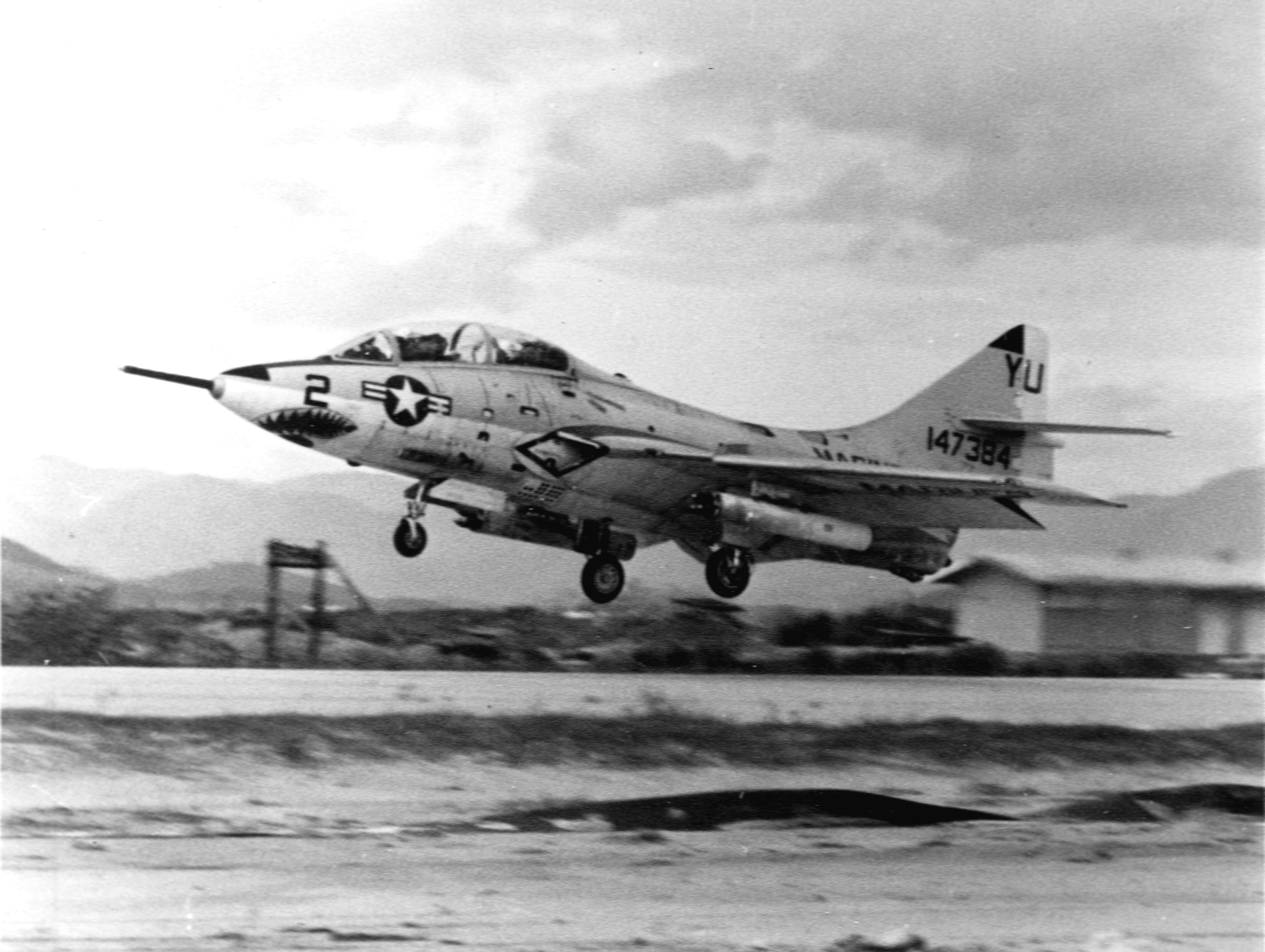
A TF-9J of H&MS-13 at Chu Lai, 1967.

Marine Aviation Logistics Squadron 13 was commissioned on 1 March 1942 at San Diego, California as Headquarters and Service Squadron 13. The squadron saw frequent action in the Pacific theater during World War II before being decommissioned on 30 November 1945.

The squadron was reactivated 15 March 1951, at Marine Corps Air Station El Toro, California, as Headquarters and Maintenance Squadron 13. During September 1966, the squadron deployed to Chu Lai Air Base, Republic of Vietnam and remained until October 1970. H&MS-13 used first the Grumman TF-9J Cougars and later Douglas TA-4F Skyhawks as fast forward air control aircraft in support of ground troops. The squadron was then relocated to El Toro, California, and assigned to the 3rd Marine Aircraft Wing until 1 October 1987, when the squadron moved to MCAS Yuma.

On 5 October 1988, the Headquarters and Maintenance Squadron within the Marine Aircraft Group (MAG) was replaced by the creation of the Marine Aviation Logistics Squadron (MALS). During the period of 10 August 1990 to October 1991, Marines from Marine Aviation Logistics Squadron 13 responded expeditiously in providing aviation logistics support during Operation Desert Storm.

=== Global War on Terror ===
In October 2002, the Squadron was tasked with providing support to six AV-8B Harrier aircraft in combat operations in Afghanistan during Operation Enduring Freedom. This detachment of MALS-13 personnel returned in October 2003. On 15 January 2003, Marine Aviation Logistics Squadron 13 embarked 205 Marines and equipment aboard the USS Bonhomme Richard in support of combat operations in Southwest Asia, deploying detachments ashore with MALS-13 Forward during Operation Southern Watch and Operation Iraqi Freedom at Al Jaber Air Base, Kuwait and An Numiniyah Expeditionary Air Field, Iraq. In May 2003, Marine Aviation Logistics Squadron 13 disembarked USS Bonhomme Richard and returned to MCAS Yuma.

In September 2012, during the Camp Bastion attack in Afghanistan, MALS-13 personnel were augmenting MALS-16 (FWD) to support aviation operations. Sgt. Bradley W. Atwell was deployed as part of this augmentation and was attached MALS-16 (FWD) in support of VMA-211's deployment to Camp Bastion. Both Marines who lost their lives in the attack—Lt. Col. Christopher K. Raible and Sgt. Atwell—were serving under units subordinate to the 3rd Marine Aircraft Wing (Forward), which was the aviation combat element of the Marine Corps in that region, and were stationed at Marine Corps Air Station Yuma under Marine Aviation Group 13.

=== Awards ===
- Presidential Unit Citation Streamer with one bronze star
- Navy Unit Commendation Streamer with three bronze stars
- Meritorious Unit Commendation Streamer with two bronze stars
- Asiatic–Pacific Campaign Medal with one bronze star
- World War II Victory Medal
- National Defense Service Medal with three bronze stars
- Vietnam Service Streamer with two silver and one bronze star
- Global War on Terrorism Expeditionary Medal.
- Global War on Terrorism Service Streamer.
- Vietnam Cross of Gallantry with Palm Streamer
- Vietnam Meritorious Unit Citation Civil Actions Streamer

== See also ==
- United States Marine Corps Aviation
- Organization of the United States Marine Corps
- List of United States Marine Corps aviation support units
