= VMFT-401 =

Marine Fighter Training Squadron 401
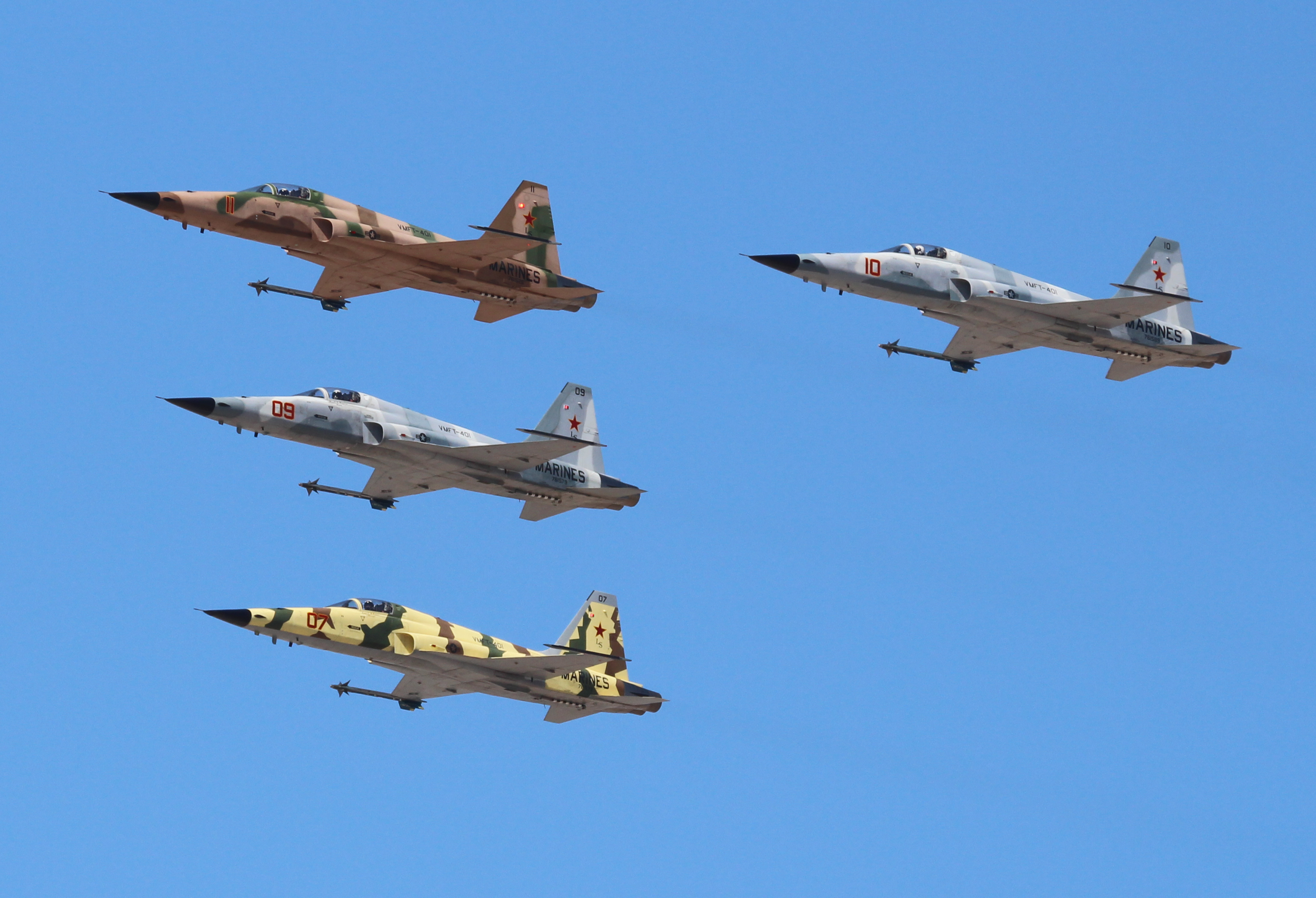
- A formation of squadron F-5N Tiger IIs over MCAS Yuma in 2018
- Active: 18 March 1986 – present
- Country: United States
- Branch: United States Marine Corps
- Type: Adversary Squadron
- Part of: United States Marine Corps Reserve: 4th Marine Aircraft Wing; Marine Aircraft Group 41
- Garrison/HQ: Marine Corps Air Station Yuma, Arizona
- Nickname(s): "Snipers"
- Tail Code: LS

Commanders
- Commanding Officer: LtCol Adam Desy
- Executive Officer: LtCol Joel Adolphson

Insignia
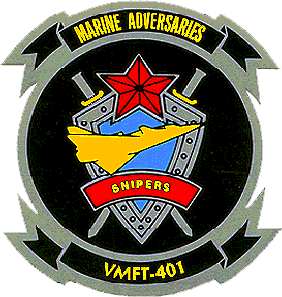
- VMFT-401 insignia

Aircraft flown
- Fighter: F-21A Kfir; F-5N Tiger II

Marine Fighter Training Squadron 401 (VMFT-401) is an adversary squadron of the United States Marine Corps Reserve, flying the F-5N Tiger II. Known as the "Snipers", the squadron is one of only two adversary squadrons in the Marine Corps, also is the first reserve squadron in the Marine Corps tasked to act as the opposing force in simulated air combat. They are based at Marine Corps Air Station Yuma and fall under the command of the 4th Marine Aircraft Wing and Marine Aircraft Group 41. VMFT-401 is a non-deployable unit.

== Mission ==
Provide instruction to active and reserve Fleet Marine Forces and Fleet squadrons through dissimilar air combat training (DACT).

The majority of VMFT-401's annual workload is their work-up and participation in the semiannual Weapons and Tactics Instructor (WTI) course conducted by Marine Aviation Weapons and Tactics Squadron One (MAWTS-1) at MCAS Yuma, Arizona. They provide adversary support in Offensive Counter-Air(OCA), Defensive Counter-Air(DCA), Basic Fighter Maneuvers(BFM), and helicopter attack during this training evolution. They also routinely train Marine F/A-18 Hornet and F-35 pilots that are assigned to Marine Corps Air Station Yuma and Marine Corps Air Station Miramar, as well as Navy and Air Force units across the southwestern United States.

== History ==
Marine Fighter Training Squadron 401 (VMFT-401) was commissioned on March 18, 1986 at Marine Corps Air Station Yuma, Arizona. In June 1987 the squadron received a number of Israeli F-21A Kfirs and during that year logged more than 4,000 hours of flight time during 16 major exercises. In 1989, they transitioned to the F-5E Tiger II which they still use.

Following the inactivation of Marine Aircraft Group 46 in June 2009, VMFT-401 transitioned under Marine Aircraft Group 41.

The squadron was recognized by the Commandant of the Marine Corps for flying more than 50,000 mishap-free flight hours. They broke the 50,000 hour mark in early July 2010 having not had a mishap since October 1995. At an average of 45 minutes per flight, 50,000 hours equates to nearly 70,000 mishap free sorties.

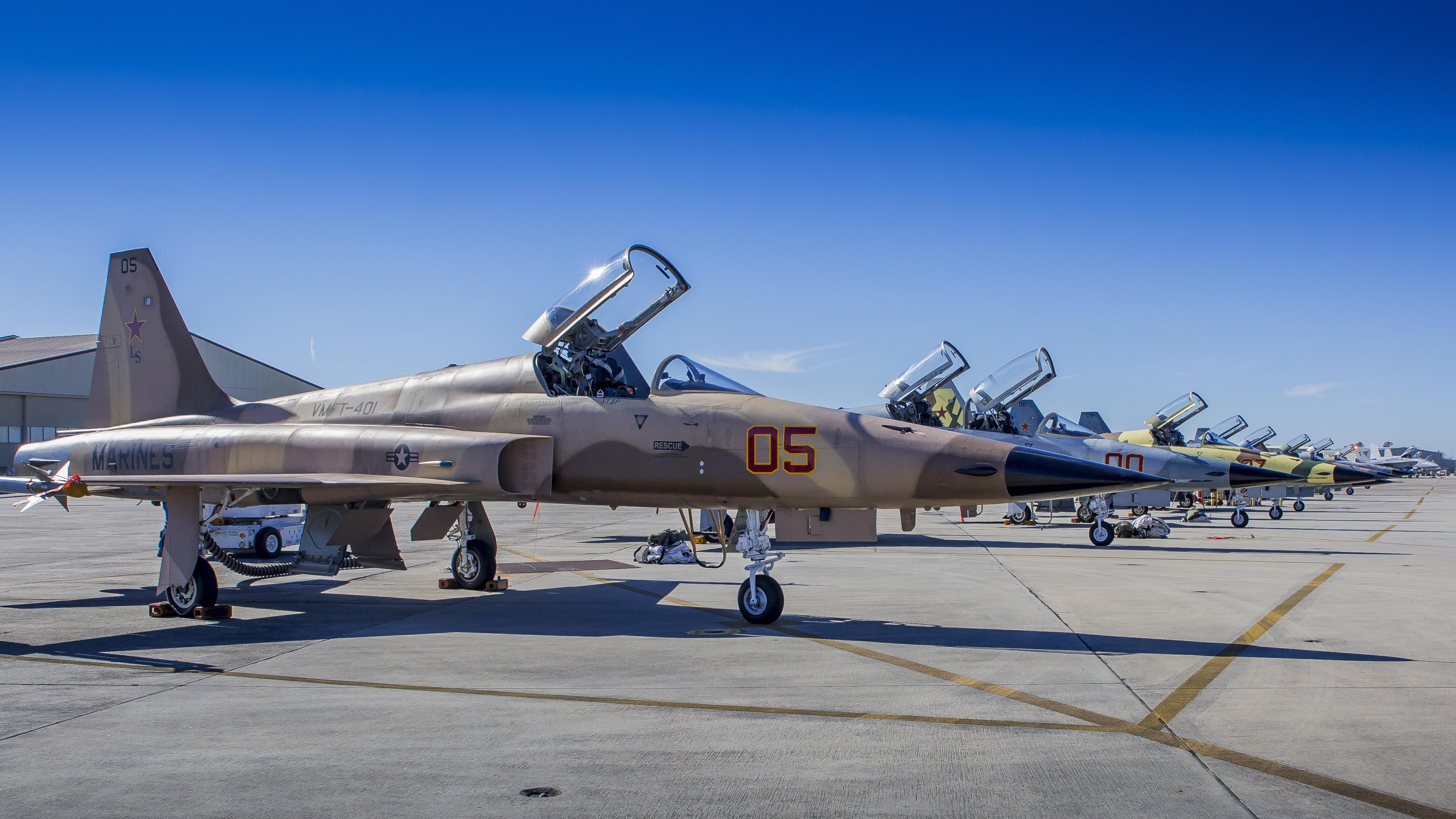
F-5N Tiger IIs of VMFT-401 on the flightline at MCAS Beaufort in 2017

== See also ==
- List of active United States Marine Corps aircraft squadrons
- United States Marine Corps Aviation
