= VMX-1 =

Marine Operational Test and Evaluation Squadron VMX-1
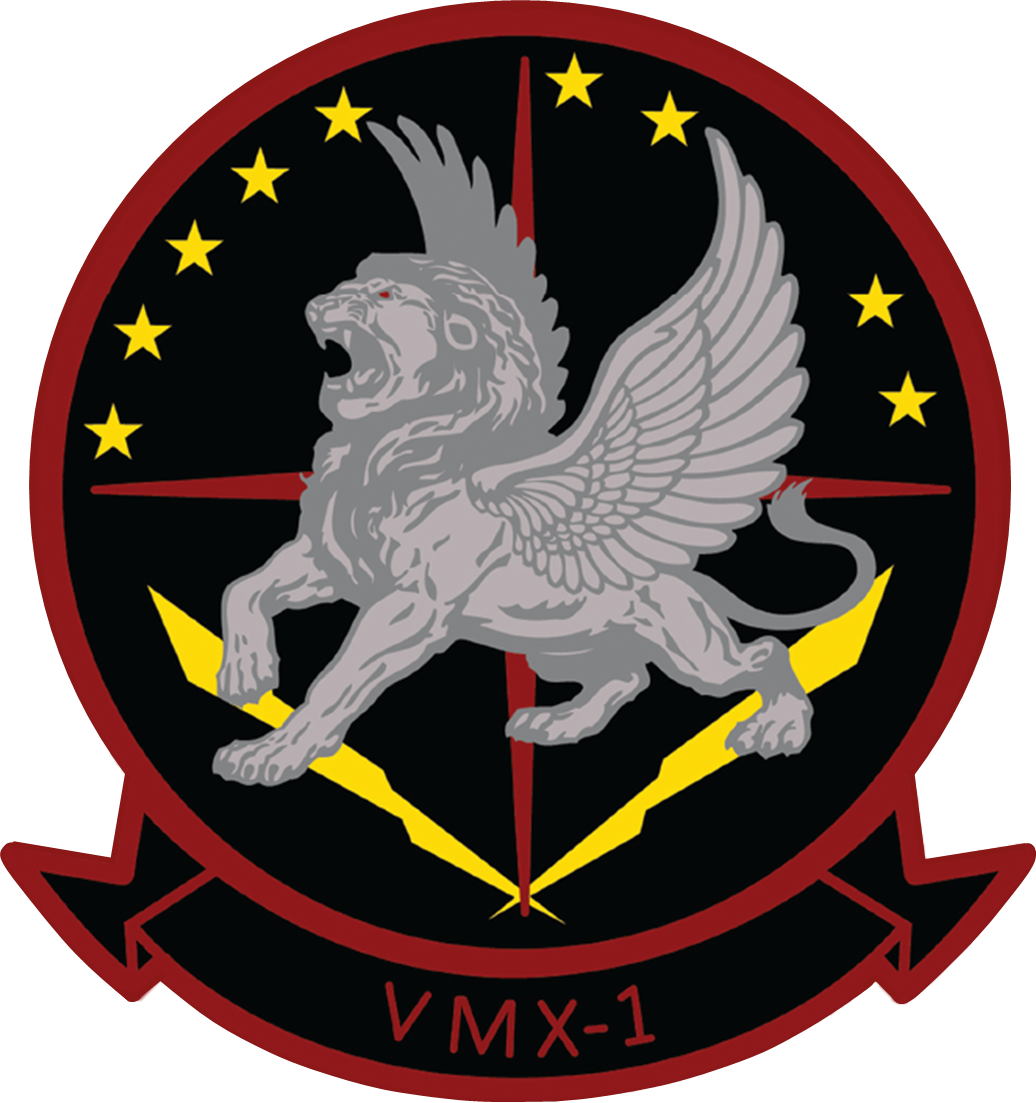
- VMX-1 insignia
- Active: 28 August 2003 - present
- Country: United States
- Branch: USMC
- Type: Operational Test and Evaluation Squadron
- Role: Operational test of MV-22B, CH-53K, F-35B, RQ-21B, UH-1Y, AH-1W, AH-1Z, K-MAX, aviation command & control systems, associated equipment, weapons systems, and software.
- Part of: Headquarters, United States Marine Corps, Aviation Branch
- Garrison/HQ: Marine Corps Air Station Yuma
- Mottos: "Mihi Cura Futuri" "Mine is the care of the future"
- Tail Code: MV
- Engagements: None

Commanders
- Current commander: Col. Robert F. Guyette

Marine Operational Test and Evaluation Squadron One (VMX-1) is a United States Marine Corps operational test squadron consisting of multiple aircraft types. The squadron is based at Marine Corps Air Station Yuma, Arizona. VMX-22 stood up in August 2003 and was redesignated VMX-1 in May 2016. VMX-1 conducts operational test under the authority of the Commander, Operational Test and Evaluation Force (COMOPTEVFOR) and the Director, Marine Corps Operational Test and Evaluation Activity (MCOTEA) depending on the program under test. The squadron uses the callsign Storm for its aircraft.

== Mission ==
VMX-1 is an independent test organization which conducts operational testing under the authority of COMOPTEVFOR or MCOTEA and administrative control of the Deputy Commandant for Aviation with the charter to:

- Conducts Operational Test and Evaluation of U.S. Marine Corps fixed-wing, tiltrotor, and rotary-wing aircraft, Unmanned Aerial Systems (UAS), and aviation command and control systems under the authority of Commander, Operational Test and Evaluation Force or Director, Marine Corps Operational Test and Evaluation Activity
- Support concept development
- Assist in creating Marine Aviation tactics, techniques, and procedures through experimentation
- Support tactical demonstrations
- Provide operational support as directed by the Deputy Commandant for Aviation

== History ==
Flight-testing of the MV-22 Osprey was delayed in the aftermath of the two incidents in 2000 and resumed in May 2002 to address the mechanical issues raised by these accidents. Included in the now on-going testing process is a rigorous, strictly regimented inspection process to verify and validate all of the aircraft’s modifications and clearances. The Integrated Test Team at Naval Air Station Patuxent River, Edwards Air Force Base, VMX-22, and the Bell Helicopter facility in Amarillo, Texas, have flown more than 4600 hours in the MV-22.

Since the MV-22 is neither a fixed-wing nor rotary-wing platform, it has a designation as a tiltrotor. The aeromechanics, composite structure, maintenance concepts, and concept of deployment are inherently unique and addressed in a squadron.

On 11 July 2014, Marines from VMX-22 accompanied USS America (LHA-6) on her maiden voyage from Mississippi, en route to her homeport in San Diego, California.

In June 2015, the Command Element and MV-22 component relocated to Marine Corps Air Station Yuma from Marine Corps Air Station New River.

In August 2015, the Light (UH-1Y) Attack (AH-1W, and AH-1Z) component and the Aviation Command and Control component relocated to Marine Corps Air Station Yuma from Naval Air Weapons Station China Lake and Camp Pendleton, CA, respectively.

On 13 May 2016 VMX-22 was re-designated as VMX-1.

In October 2019, the F-35B Testing Detachment stationed on Edwards Air Force Base, California moved to MCAS Yuma, Arizona.

In June 2024, VMX-1 received its first CH-53K King Stallion heavy lift helicopter.

== See also ==
- List of United States Marine Corps aircraft squadrons
- United States Marine Corps Aviation

== Photographs ==
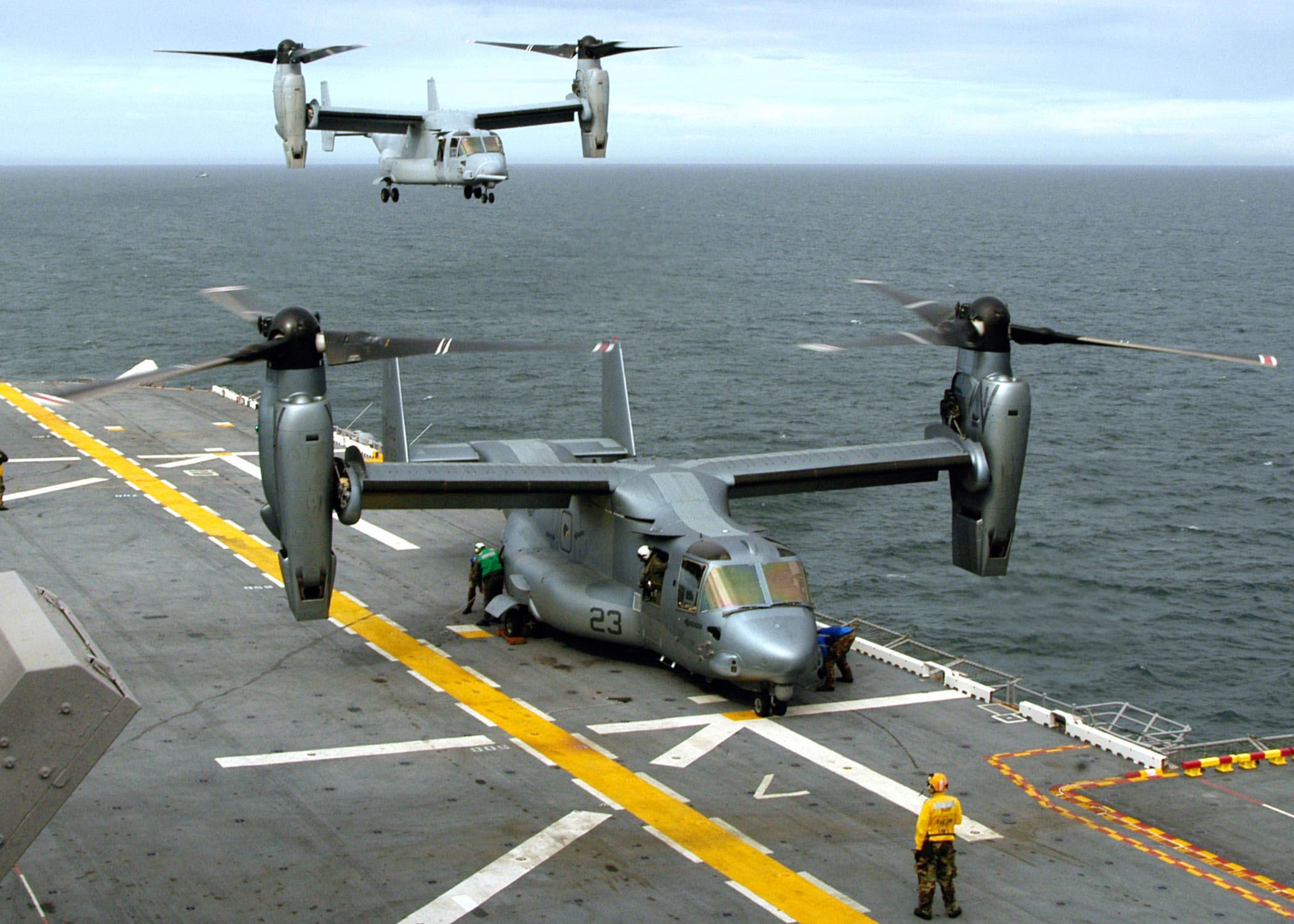
MV-22Bs of VMX-22 landing on USS Wasp, November 2005

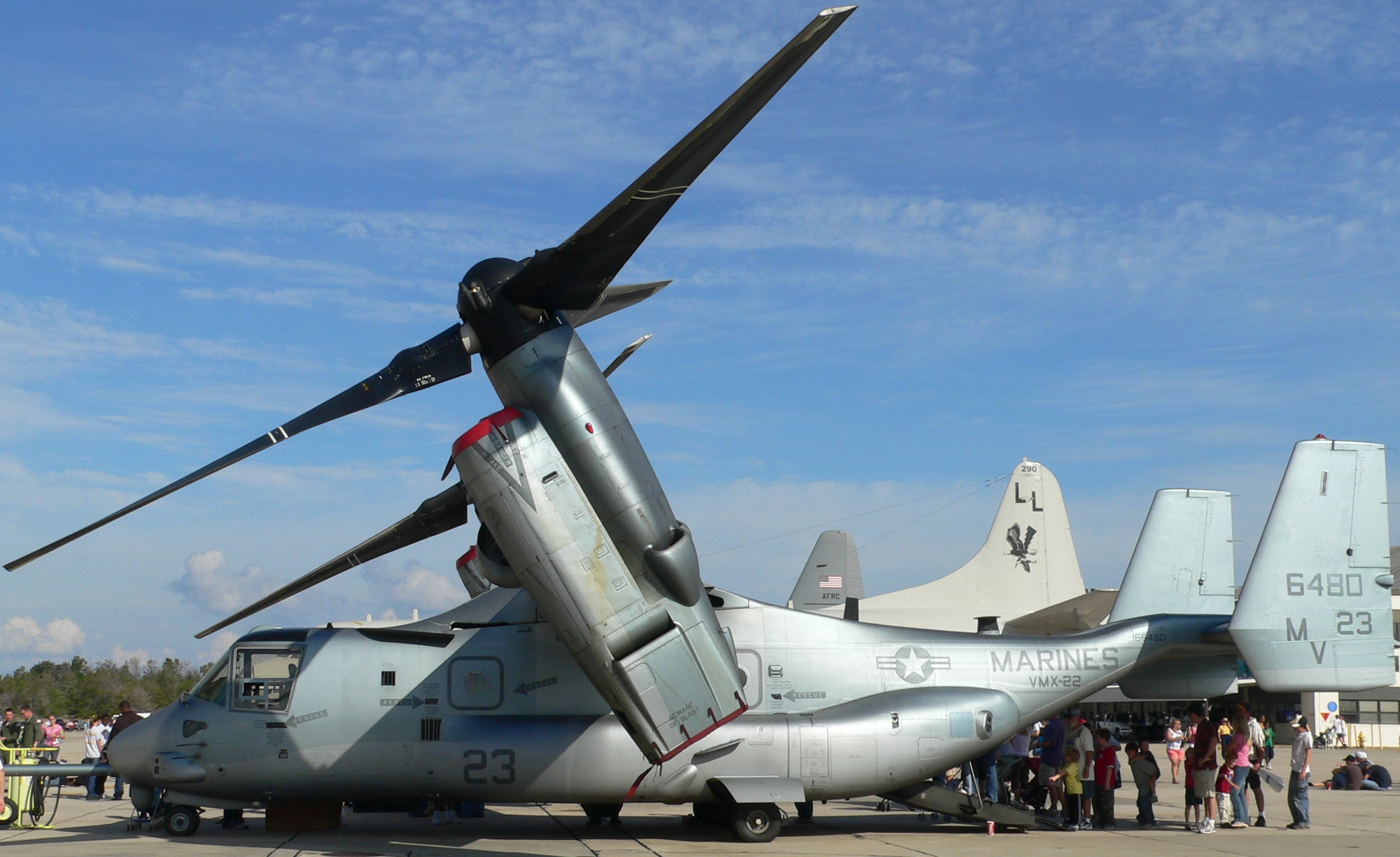
An MV-22 of VMX-22 at NAS Pensacola, November 2006

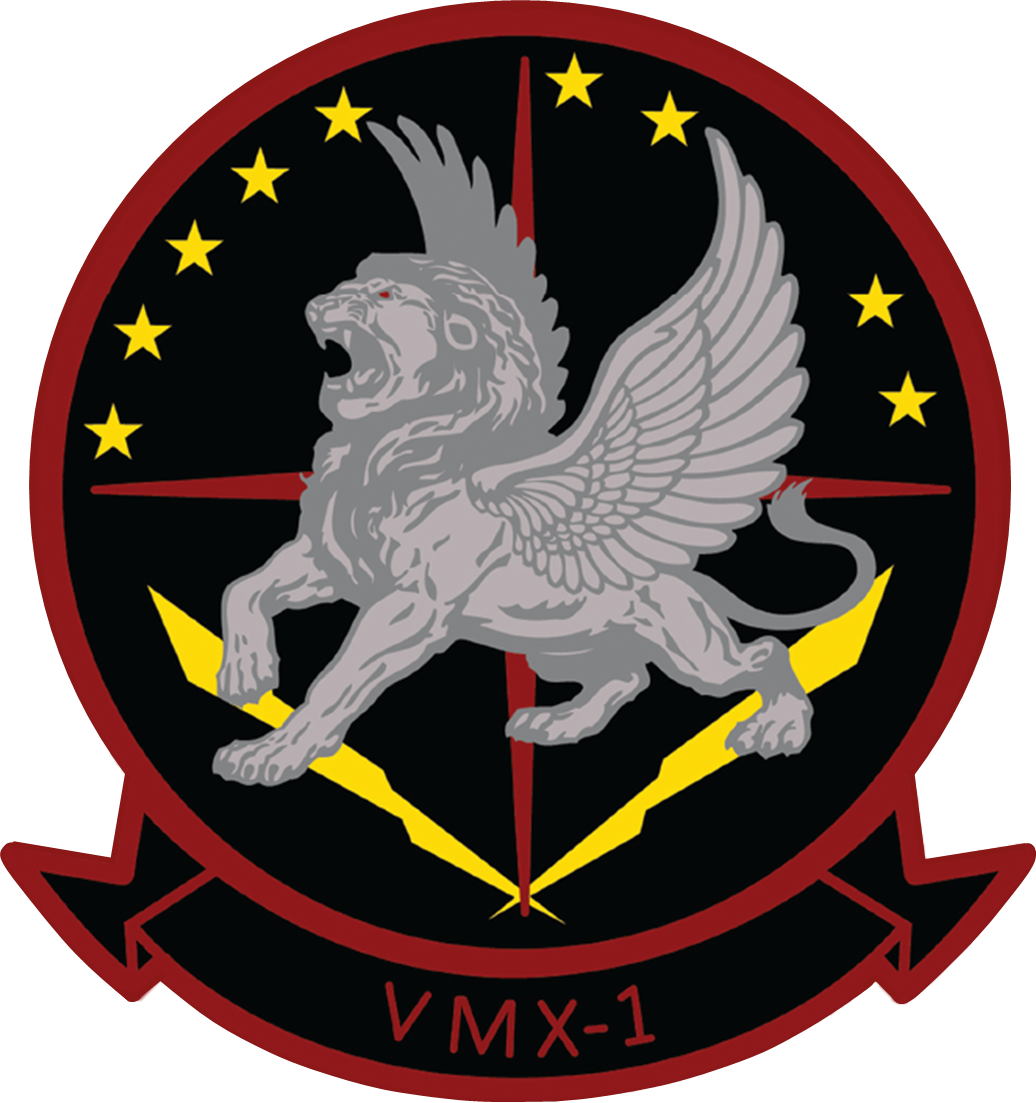
VMX-1 Logo
