= VMFA-225 =

Marine Fighter Attack Squadron 225
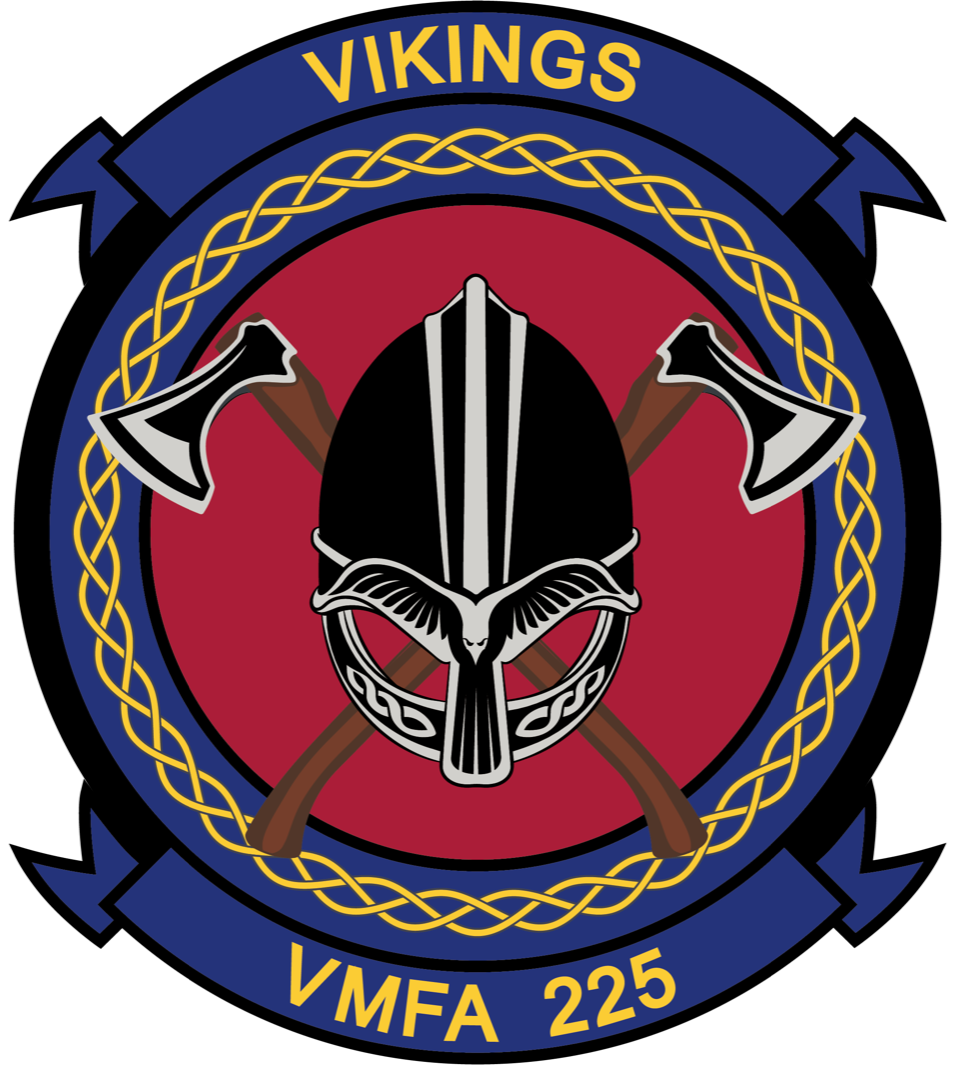
- Active: 1 Jan 1943 – 15 Jun 1972; 1 Jul 1991 – present
- Country: United States of America
- Branch: United States Marine Corps
- Type: Fighter/Attack
- Role: Close air support Air interdiction Aerial reconnaissance Suppression of Enemy Air Defense (SEAD)
- Part of: Marine Aircraft Group 13; 3rd Marine Aircraft Wing
- Garrison/HQ: Marine Corps Air Station Yuma
- Nicknames: "Vikings" (1965 to present) "Vagabonds" (1947-1965) "Death Dealers" (WWII)
- Tail Code: CE
- Engagements: World War II; Vietnam War; Operation Iraqi Freedom; Operation Southern Spear; Operation Absolute Resolve

Commanders
- Current commander: LtCol Benjamin M. Boera

Insignia
- Call sign: Viking

Aircraft flown
- Attack: AD-4B Skyraider; A-4 Skyhawk; A-6 Intruder
- Fighter: F4U Corsair; F/A-18D Hornet; F-35B Lightning II

Marine Fighter Attack Squadron 225 (VMFA-225) is a United States Marine Corps fighter attack squadron flying the F-35B Lightning II. The squadron, known as the "Vikings", is based at Marine Corps Air Station Yuma in Arizona and falls under the command of Marine Aircraft Group 13 (MAG-13) and the 3rd Marine Aircraft Wing (3d MAW).

== History ==
=== World War II ===
Marine Fighting Squadron 225 (VMF-225) was commissioned 1 January 1943, at Marine Corps Air Station Mojave, California. From August 1944 to January 1945, the F4U Corsairs of VMF-225 participated in numerous combat operations in the New Hebrides Islands.

Returning to the United States in February 1945, VMF-225 was eventually stationed at Marine Corps Air Station Cherry Point, North Carolina, with interim basing at MCAAS Mojave, California; MCAS Santa Ana, California; and MCAS Edenton, North Carolina. The squadron was redesignated as Marine Attack Squadron (VMA-225) on 15 June 1952.

=== Vietnam War ===
In the early 1950s the squadron had been trained for "special weapons" delivery. This meant they were certified to deliver nuclear weapons. On 1 June 1965, skyhawks from VMA-225 were the first tactical fixed-wing aircraft to land at Chu Lai Air Base for participation in combat operations against Viet Cong forces in South Vietnam. Several hours after landing, Lieutenant Colonel Robert W. Baker, VMA-225 Commanding Officer, lead the first combat mission from the base striking the enemy six miles to the north.

VMA-225 returned to MCAS Cherry Point in October 1965. In April 1966 the Grumman built A-6 Intruder replaced the A-4 Skyhawk as the squadron's combat ready aircraft. With the advent of the Intruder and its all weather capability, the squadron was redesignated VMA(AW)-225. While stationed at MCAS Cherry Point, VMA(AW)-225 provided air support for units of the 2nd Marine Division, Fleet Marine Force, Atlantic. The squadron also deployed several times to MCAS Yuma, Arizona, for live weapons training.

In January 1969, VMA(AW)-225 deployed to Da Nang Air Base, Vietnam. The primary mission of Marine All Weather Attack Squadron 225 was to provide close air support and direct air support for ground elements for allied forces in the I Corp area of South Vietnam. The squadron attacked and destroyed surface targets day and night, and in all weather conditions. A secondary mission was to utilize the Intruder's unique search radar Airborne Moving Target Indicator (AMTI) features in the interdiction of trucks on the Ho Chi Minh Trail in Southeast Asia. During May 1971, VMA(AW)-225 returned to MCAS El Toro, California, and the squadron was deactivated on 15 June 1972.

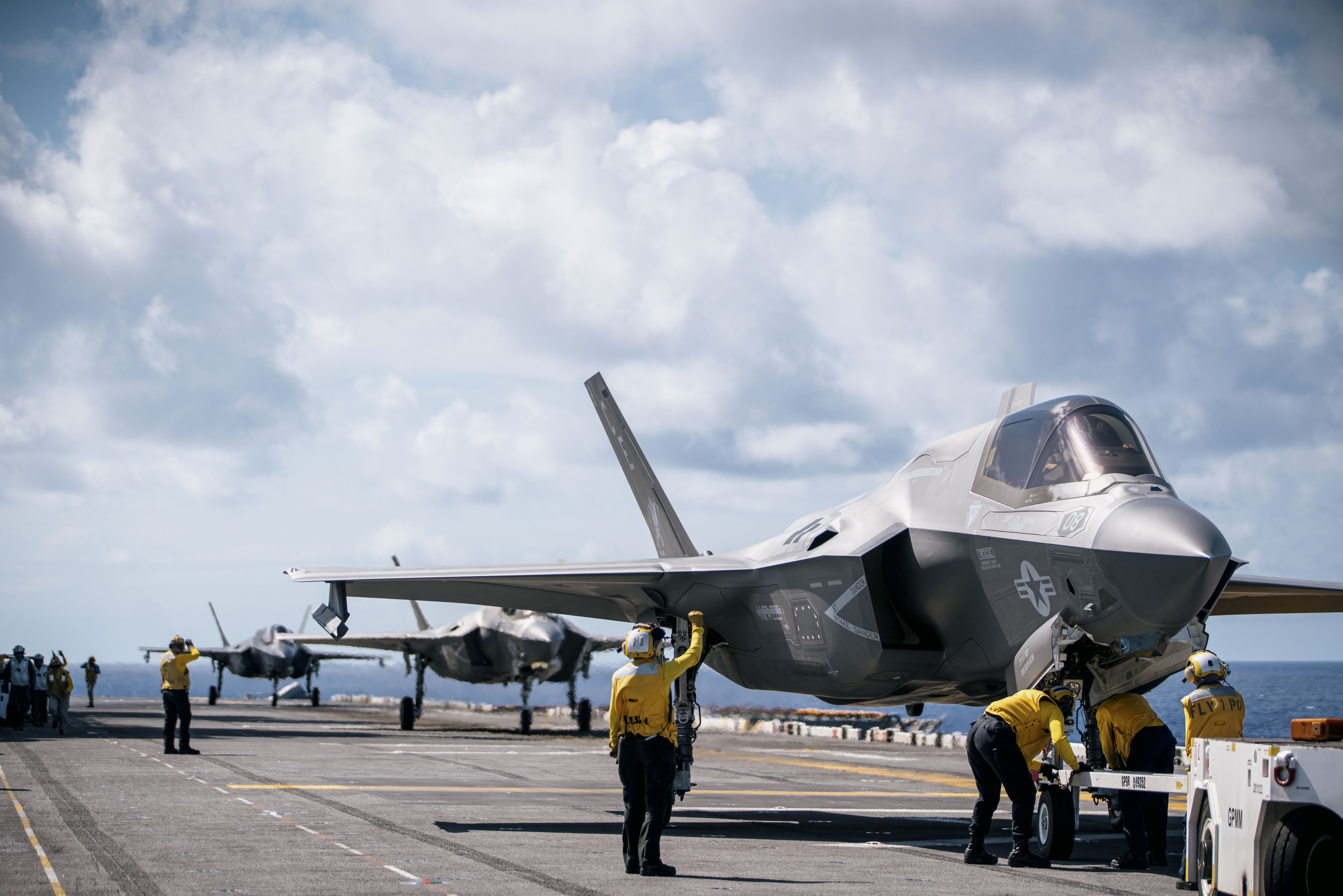
Vikings embarked on the USS Boxer.

=== The Gulf War & the 1990s ===
The squadron was reactivated on 1 July 1991, at MCAS El Toro, California, and redesignated as Marine All Weather Fighter Attack Squadron 225 (VMFA(AW)-225). At this time the squadron was assigned to fly F/A-18D Hornets, which had begun service with Marine Corps in 1983.

=== The Global War on Terror ===
VMFA(AW)-225 was the first Marine Corps fighter squadron deployed to the Middle East in support of Operation Iraqi Freedom. The squadron was deployed in January 2003 from its home base at MCAS Miramar in San Diego, CA to Ahmed Al Jabar Air Base in Kuwait. From Kuwait, the "Vikings" took part in Operation Southern Watch, assisting the US Air Force in patrolling the Southern No-Fly-Zone set up by the United Nations in Iraq. In March 2003, VMFA(AW)-225 began flying combat sorties in support of Operation Iraqi Freedom. Joining 225 were other members of Marine Aircraft Group 11.VMFA (AW)-225 also deployed in support of OIF in 2007 and 2008 at Al-Asad Air Base in Iraq.

=== F-35B Lightning II ===
The Vikings conducted their final Hornet flight on 23 January 2020, and are to transition to the F-35B Lightning II The unit officially transitioned on 29 January 2021.

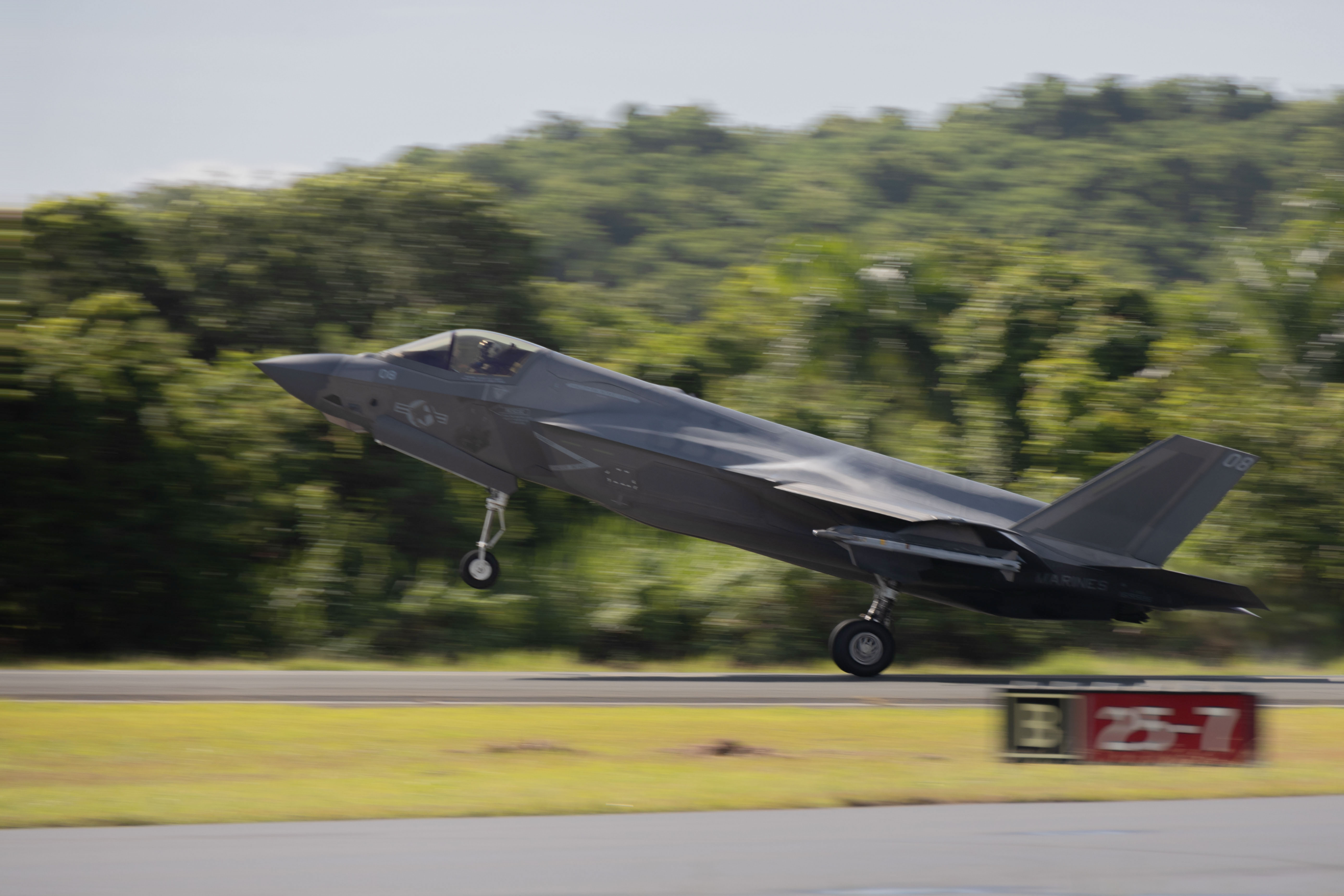
Vikings deployed at Puerto Rico.

In July 2024, the Vikings deployed with the USS Boxer (LHD-4) while assigned to the 15th MEU and conducted routine operations in the U.S. 7th Fleet area of operations.

In September 2025, ten F-35B's from VMFA-225 landed at José Aponte de la Torre Airport to support the United States' military buildup in the Caribbean against Venezuela.

VMFA-225 participated in combat operations during Operation Absolute Resolve, the mission within Operation Southern Spear that captured Nicolas Maduro.

In April, 2026, VMFA concluded their deployment for Operation Southern Spear at NAS Roosevelt Roads and returned home to MCAS Yuma.

== Gallery ==
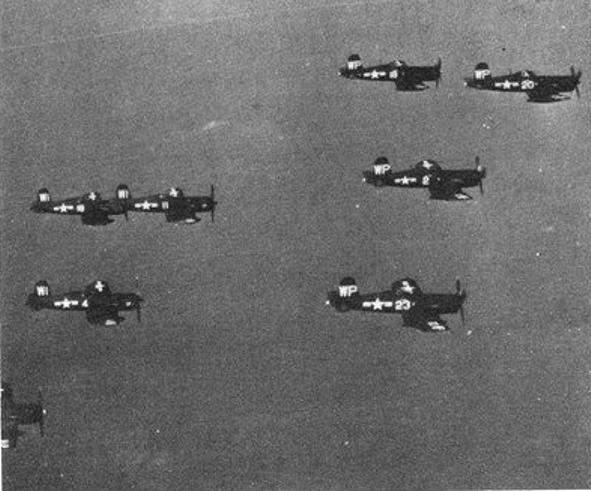
VMF-223 and VMF-225 F4U-4 Corsairs, 1949

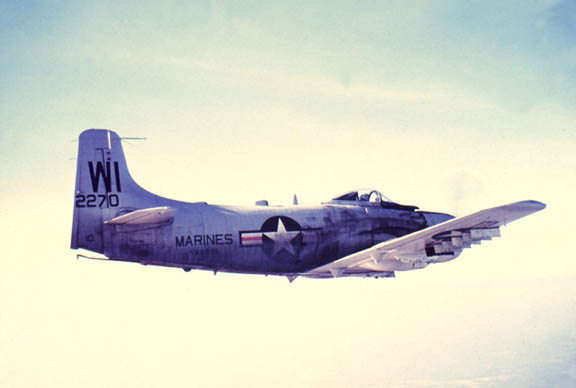
VMA-225 AD-4B Skyraider, 1956

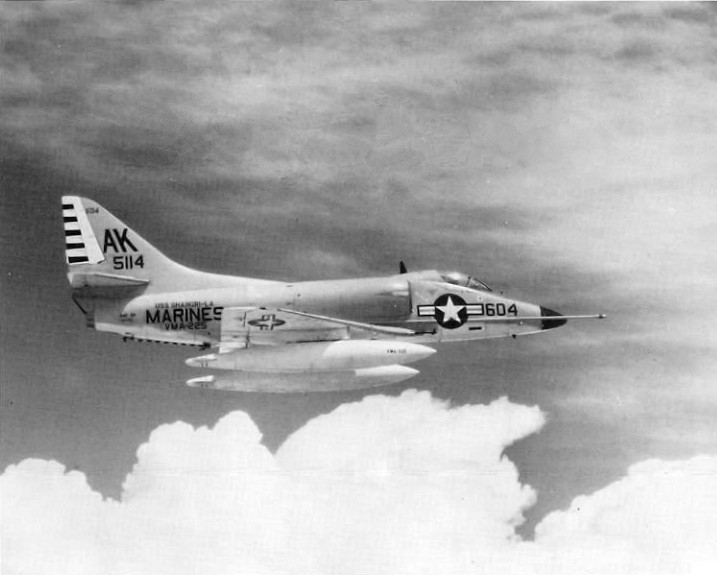
VMA-225 A-4C Skyhawk, 1961

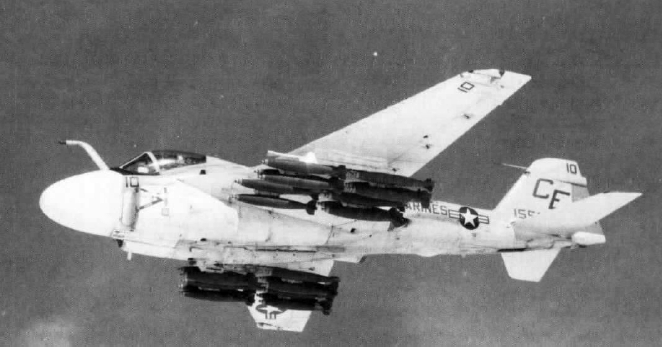
VMA(AW)-225 A-6A Intruder in Vietnam, 1969

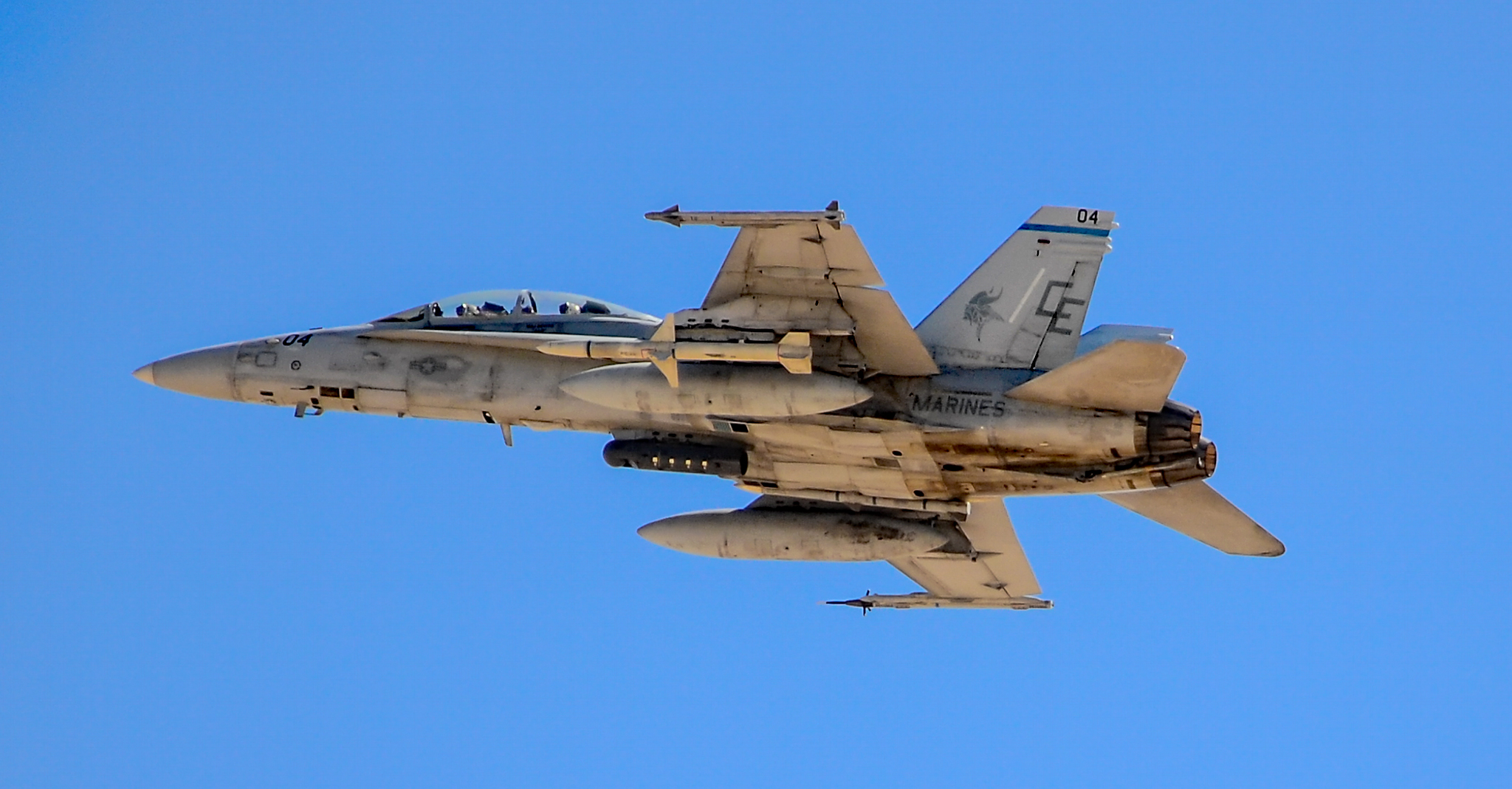
VMFA(AW)-225 F/A-18D Hornet, 2018

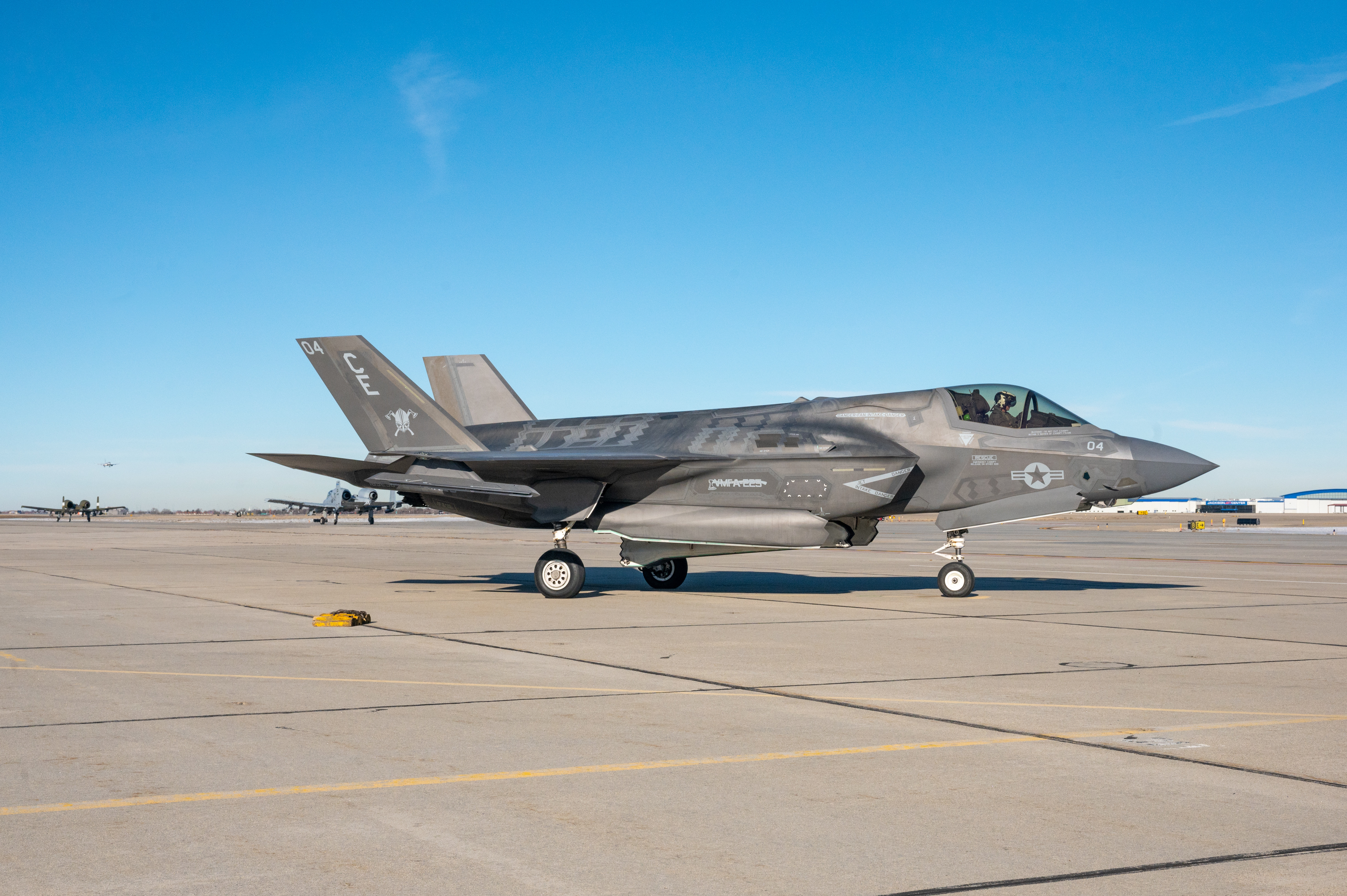
VMFA-225 F-35B Lightning II, 2022

== See also ==
- List of active United States Marine Corps aircraft squadrons
- United States Marine Corps Aviation
- Organization of the United States Marine Corps
