= Marine Aircraft Group 13 =

United States military unit

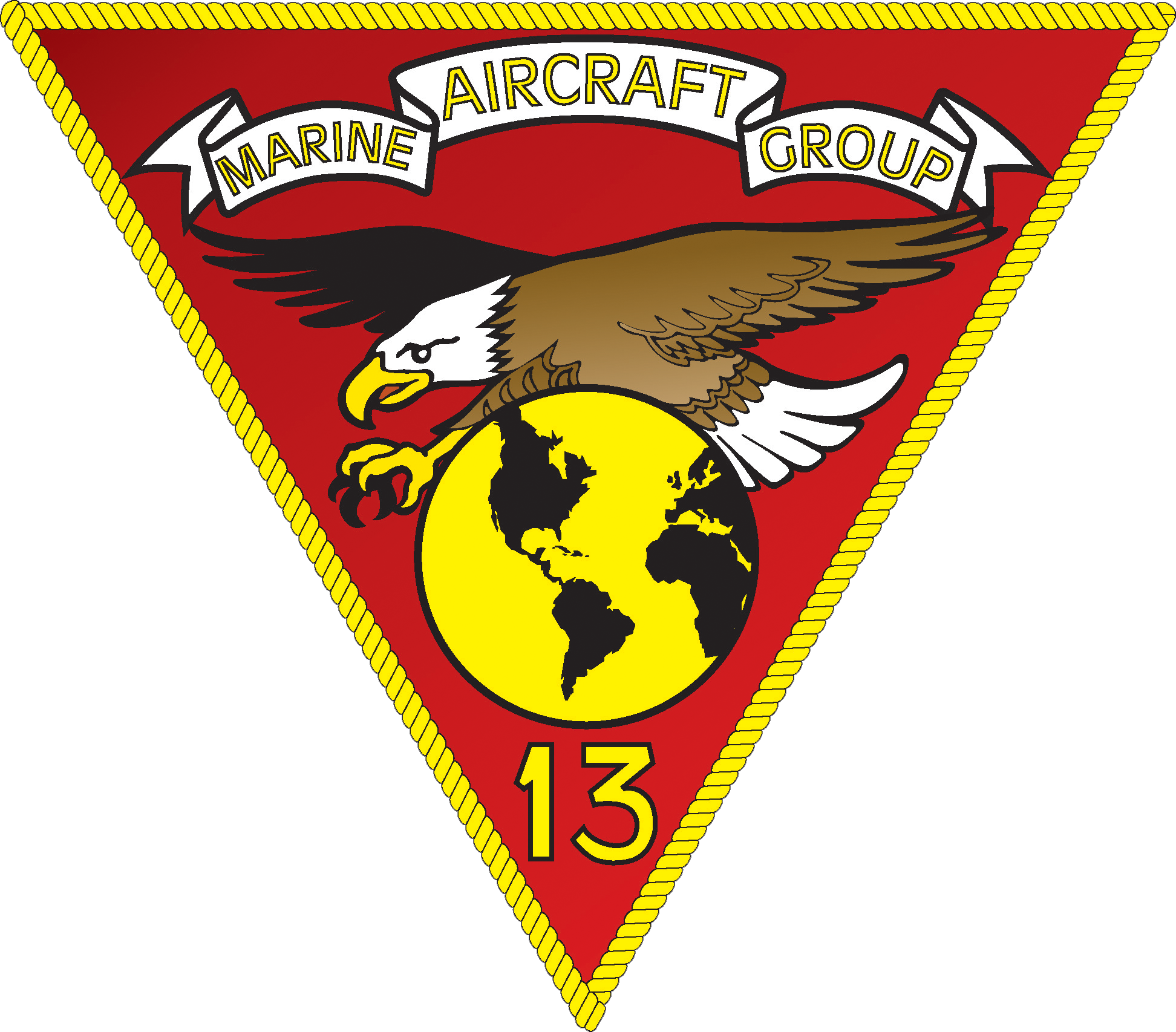
- MAG-13 insignia
- Active: 1 March 1942 – present
- Allegiance: United States of America
- Branch: United States Marine Corps
- Type: Marine Aircraft Group
- Role: Offensive Air Support; Aerial Reconnaissance
- Part of: 3d Marine Aircraft Wing; I Marine Expeditionary Force
- Garrison/HQ: Marine Corps Air Station Yuma
- Engagements: World War II; Korean War; Vietnam War; Operation Desert Storm; Operation Enduring Freedom; Operation Iraqi Freedom

Commanders
- Commanding Officer: Colonel Roy Nicka
- Executive Officer: LtCol Anthony M. Koehl
- Sergeant Major: Sergeant Major Cyprian D. Johnson

Marine Aircraft Group 13 is a United States Marine Corps aviation unit based at Marine Corps Air Station Yuma that is currently composed of four Lockheed Martin F-35B Lightning II squadrons, an unmanned aerial vehicle squadron, a maintenance and logistics squadron, and a wing support squadron. The group falls under the command of the 3rd Marine Aircraft Wing and the I Marine Expeditionary Force.

== Mission ==
Provide air support to Marine Air-Ground Task Force commanders.

== Organization 2024 ==
As of March 2024 the Marine Aircraft Group 13 consists of:

F-35B Lightning II squadrons:

- VMFA-122 "Werewolves"
- VMFA-211 "Wake Island Avengers"
- VMFA-214 "Black Sheep"
- VMFA-225 "Vikings"

MQ-9A Reaper squadron:

- VMU-1

Support squadron:

- Marine Aviation Logistics Squadron 13 (MALS-13)

== History ==
=== World War II ===
Marine Aircraft Group 13 was activated 1 March 1942, in San Diego, California. A week later the group's forward echelon was en route to Samoa. The first planes from MAG-13 arrived at Tutuila on 2 April 1942 at which point they assumed responsibility for the air defense of American Samoa. In these early days of the war, before the victories at Midway and Guadalcanal, Samoa was seen as very vulnerable and open to attack by the Japanese. MAG-13 pilots were mostly untrained and each MAG-13 squadron was also instructed to organize as an infantry company should the need to defend the islands ever arise. By 27 May part of the group was based out of Funafuti and on 15 December another element moved to Nanumea. Squadrons from the group operated out of Wallis, Nukufetau, Tarawa and Makin Atoll before the entire group was consolidated on Majuro in April 1944. From there they participated in the campaign to neutralize by-passed Japanese bases in the Marshall Islands. The group remained on Majuro until the end of the war. MAG-13 returned to the west coast in October 1945 and were deactivated shortly thereafter.

=== Post World War II years ===
Reformed in March 1951, the MAG moved to Marine Corps Air Station Kaneohe Bay, Hawaii, in early 1952 with two fighter squadrons and Marine Air Control Squadron 2. Aviation units based at Marine Corps Air Station El Toro were rotated to MCAS Kaneohe Bay every six months for training until April 1954. On 1 May 1956, the 1st Marine Brigade assumed its title in lieu of the 1st Provisional Marine Air Ground Task Force designation, and MAG-13 provided the air support for the unique organization. It gained the distinction of being the only composite Marine Aircraft Group, composed of fighter, attack and helicopter squadrons, supporting the ground arm of the brigade.

=== Vietnam War ===
In June 1965, MAG-13 became a unit of the 1st Marine Aircraft Wing at Marine Corps Air Station Iwakuni, Japan, where it operated until September 1966 when it deployed to South Vietnam. Based out of Chu Lai Air Base, MAG-13 supported the III Marine Amphibious Force and other forces in I Corps and II Corps tactical zones, Laos, North Vietnam and Cambodia. Initially the Group consisted of VMFA-314, VMFA-323 and VMFA-542 all operating F-4B Phantoms. In December 1965, VMFA-542 was replaced with VMFA-115 while VMFA-232 and VMFA-334 arrived in early 1969 with the new F-4J's. This was the structure that remained through most of 1969.

MAG-13 headquarters left South Vietnam in September 1970 and returned to MCAS El Toro in October of that same year. During the group's four years in South Vietnam, it subordinate squadrons flew 87,027 sorties in support of combat operations.

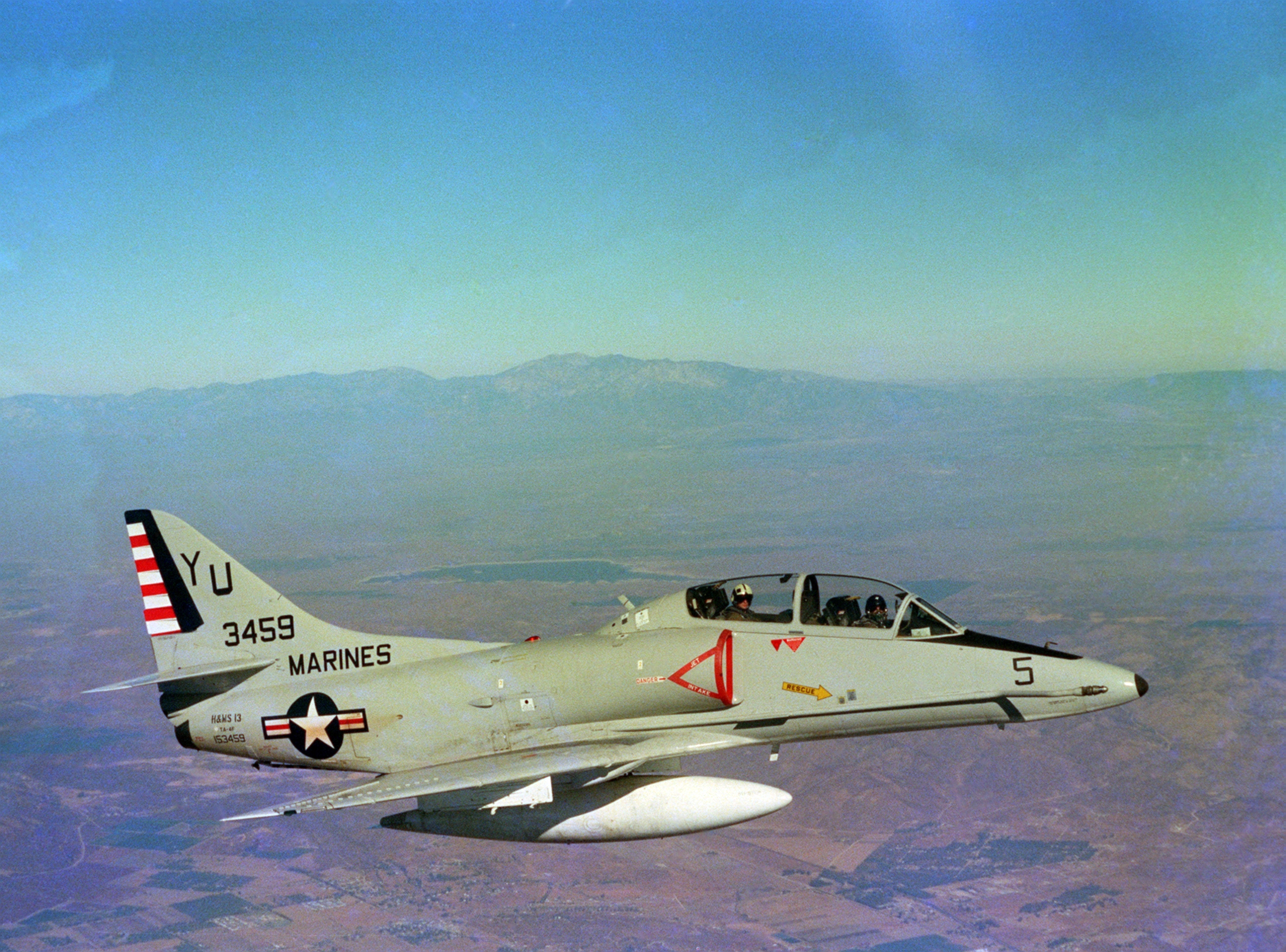
A TA-4F Skyhawk of H&MS-13 in 1975

=== 1980s to present ===
The Group moved to Marine Corps Air Station Yuma on 1 October 1987.

=== Global war on terror ===
In early January 2003 Marine Aircraft Group 13 deployed to the Persian Gulf in support of Operation Iraqi Freedom. With 60 Harriers operating from the USS Bonhomme Richard (LHD-6) and 16 from Al Jaber Air Base in Kuwait, Harriers of Marine Aircraft Group 13 flew over 2,000 sorties, over 3,000 flight hours and expended over 750,000 pounds of ordnance in support of I Marine Expeditionary Force.

Between 2003 and 2007 all four VMA squadrons of Marine Aircraft Group 13 made multiple deployments to Al Asad Air Base to support coalition combat operations in Iraq. During this period, MAG-13 squadrons also deployed to Japan to support the 31st Marine Expeditionary Unit, and provided Harrier detachments in support the 11th, 13th, and 15th Marine Expeditionary Units (MEU). In 2005, Marine Aircraft Group 13 squadrons upgraded the avionics and software systems of the AV-8B, enabling all weather precision strike capability. These warfighting enhancements were demonstrated in early 2006, when VMA-513 became the first Marine Harrier squadron to employ the Joint Direct Attack Munition (JDAM) in combat.

Since September 2001, MAG-13 has amassed over 15,000 combat flight hours in support of Operation Iraqi Freedom and Operation Enduring Freedom.

== Unit awards ==
Since the beginning of World War II, the United States military has honored various units for extraordinary heroism or outstanding non-combat service. This information comes from the official Marine Aircraft Group 13 webpage and is certified by the Commandant of the Marine Corps.

Streamer	Award	Year(s)	Additional Info
	Presidential Unit Citation Streamer with one Bronze Star	1966–1967, 2003	Vietnam War, Iraq War
	Navy Unit Commendation Streamer with three Bronze Stars	1967–68, 1968, 1969–70, 1990–1991	Vietnam War, Desert Storm,
	Meritorious Unit Commendation Streamer with two Bronze Stars	1994-5, 1999–2000, 2006	
	Asiatic-Pacific Campaign Streamer with one Bronze Star		
	World War II Victory Streamer	1942–1945	Pacific War
	National Defense Service Streamer with three Bronze Stars	1950–1954, 1961–1974, 1990–1995, 2001–present	Korean War, Vietnam War, Gulf War, war on terrorism
	Vietnam Service Streamer with two Silver Stars	1965, 1966–1967	
	Southwest Asia Service Streamer with two Bronze Stars	1990–1991	Desert Shield, Desert Storm
	Iraq Campaign Streamer	2006, 2007–2008, 2009	
	Global War on Terrorism Expeditionary Streamer	2001–present	
	Global War on Terrorism Service Streamer	2001–present	
	Vietnam Gallantry Cross with Palm Streamer		
	Vietnam Meritorious Unit Citation Civil Actions Streamer		

== See also ==
- United States Marine Corps Aviation
- List of United States Marine Corps aircraft groups
- List of United States Marine Corps aircraft squadrons
