= VMU-1 =

Marine Unmanned Aerial Vehicle Squadron 1
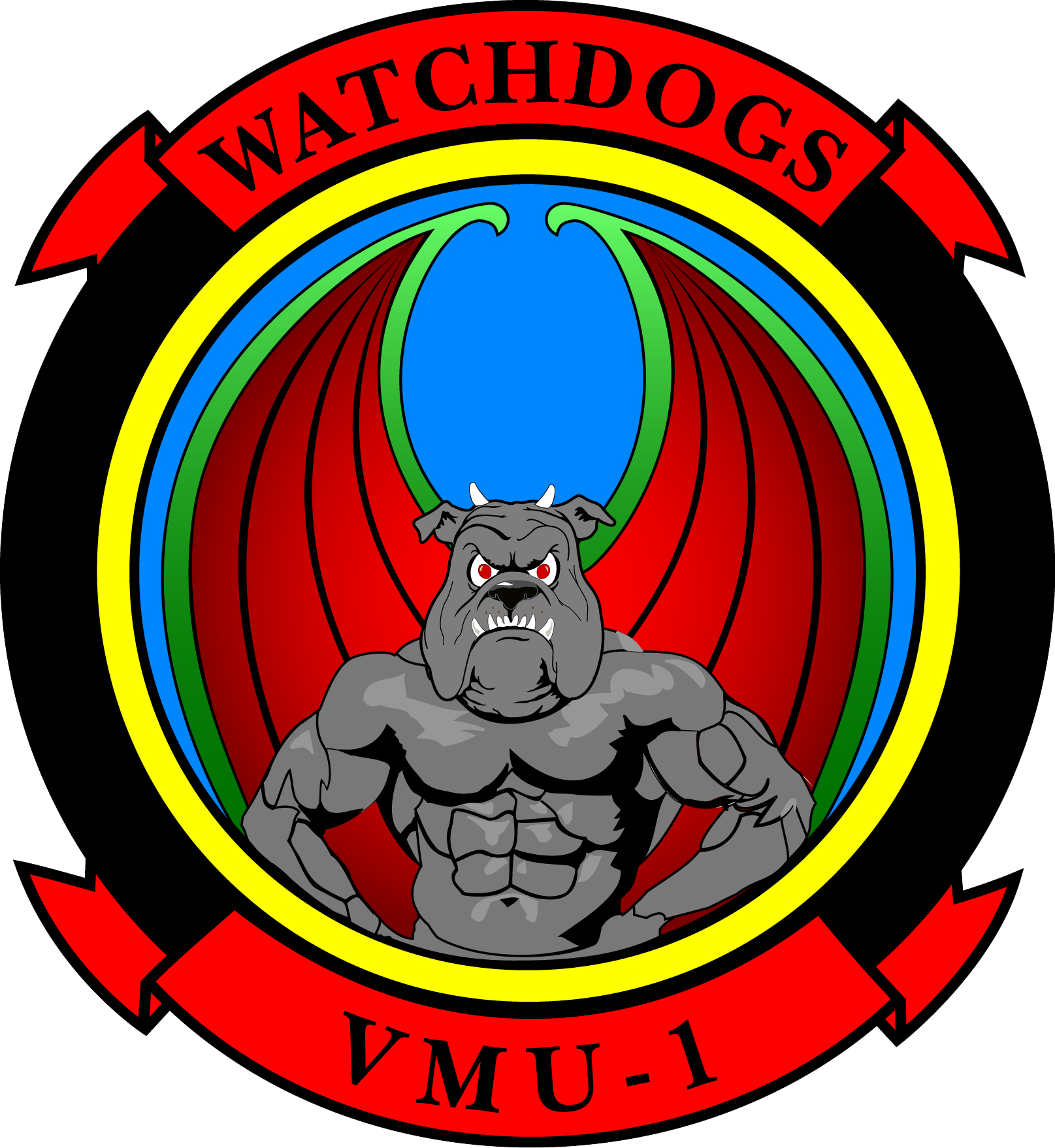
- Active: 21 January 1987 - present
- Country: United States
- Branch: USMC
- Type: Reconnaissance, Surveillance, Target Acquisition
- Size: about 250 personnel
- Garrison/HQ: Marine Corps Air Station Yuma
- Nickname: "Watchdogs"
- Motto: "See all evil"
- Colors: WG
- Engagements: Operation Desert Storm; Operation Joint Endeavor; Operation Iraqi Freedom * 2003 invasion of Iraq; Operation Enduring Freedom

Commanders
- Commanding Officer: LtCol Clayton Holland
- Coffee Mess Officer: Maj Jeffery Engel

Marine Unmanned Aerial Vehicle Squadron 1 (VMU-1) is an unmanned aerial vehicle squadron in the United States Marine Corps that operates the MQ-9A Reaper. They are based out of Marine Corps Air Station Yuma, Arizona and provide reconnaissance, surveillance, and target acquisition for the I Marine Expeditionary Force. They fall under the command of Marine Aircraft Group 13 and the 3rd Marine Aircraft Wing.

== History ==
=== Early years ===
On 21 January 1987, 1st Remotely Piloted Vehicle Company was activated at Marine Corps Air Ground Combat Center (MCAGCC) Twentynine Palms, California as part of the 7th Marine Amphibious Brigade. On 24 June 1987, 3rd RPV Company was activated at (MCAGCC) also as part of the 7th Marine Amphibious Brigade. On 15 December 1989, 1st and 3rd RPV Companies were reassigned to 1st Surveillance, Reconnaissance, and Intelligence Group.

=== Operation Desert Storm ===
From 29 January through 3 March 1990, 1st RPV Company operated from LaSalle County Airport in Cotulla, Texas in support of Joint Task Force Six's drug interdiction Operation Border Eagle. 1st RPV Company Pioneer UAVs helped law enforcement agencies apprehend 372 illegal aliens and confiscate more than $850,000 worth of marijuana during the operation.

During September 1990 through March 1991, both 1st and 3rd RPV Companies were deployed to the Kingdom of Saudi Arabia in support of Operation Desert Shield and Operation Desert Storm. 1st RPV Company flew 169 sorties for 568 flight hours and 3rd RPV Company flew 239 sorties for 695 flight hours in support of the operations. In what was the United States’ first combat test of the Pioneer UAV and throughout the operation it detected a host of enemy activity including troop movements, artillery positions, armored formations, surface-to-surface missiles, and air defense sites.

=== 1990s ===
On 6 January 1994, 1st RPV Company merged with 3rd RPV Company to form 1st Unmanned Aerial Vehicle (UAV) Company then on 15 January 1996, 1st UAV Company was re-designated Marine Unmanned Aerial Vehicle Squadron 1 (VMU-1) and was reassigned to Marine Air Control Group 38 (MACG-38), 3rd Marine Aircraft Wing.

From 5 June, through 22 October 1996, VMU-1 was deployed to Bosnia-Herzegovina in support of the NATO peacekeeping Operation Joint Endeavor and was the first 3rd Marine Aircraft Wing unit to arrive in-theater. From its base at Boyington Airfield near Tuzla, VMU-1 flew 36 sorties for 84.4 flight hours in support of Task Force Eagle.

During 13 July, through 15 August 1998, VMU-1 operated from Cameron County Airport in Port Isabel, Texas in support of Joint Task Force Six drug interdiction and immigration enforcement operations. The squadron flew 35 sorties for 74.7 flight hours in coordination with the United States Coast Guard and the National Park Service.

From 13 September through 2 October 1999, VMU-1 operated from Marine Corps Air Station Yuma, Arizona in support of Joint Task Force Six drug interdiction and immigration enforcement operations along the US/Mexico border. The squadron flew 40.2 flight hours in support of the operation.

=== 2000s ===
During 21 January through 3 March 2001, VMU-1 operated from Laughlin Air Force Base in Del Rio, Texas in support of Joint Task Force Six drug interdiction and immigration enforcement operations along the US/Mexico border. The squadron flew 26 sorties for 56.9 flight hours during the operation.

During 30 July through 28 August 2002, VMU-1 along with MWCS-38 operated from Boundary County Airport in Bonner's Ferry, Idaho in support of Joint Task Force Six drug interdiction and immigration enforcement operations along the US/Canada border. The squadron flew 26 sorties for 65.3 flight hours and helped law enforcement agencies confiscate more than $1,000,000 worth of marijuana during the operation.

=== Global War on Terror ===
On 9 February 2003 VMU-1 deployed to Ali As Salem Airbase, Kuwait in support of Operation Southern Focus. The squadron subsequently moved to Tactical Assembly Area Coyote near the Iraqi border and on 28 February commenced reconnaissance and surveillance flights over Iraq in support of I Marine Expeditionary Force.

19 March 2003 saw the beginning of Operation Iraqi Freedom with VMU-1 in direct support of the 1st Marine Division. During its first combat sortie in support of the invasion, the squadron located and reported an enemy artillery battery that was subsequently destroyed by friendly artillery. On 22 March, VMU-1 crossed the line of departure into Iraq and redeployed to Jalibah Airfield from where they supported Task Force Tarawa’s assault through An Nasariyah. On 1 April, the squadron convoyed to Qalat Sikar to support Regimental Combat Team 1 operations in the vicinity of Al Kut. VMU-1 moved to An Numaniyah on 4 April from where one of their Pioneers was the first Marine UAV to fly over Baghdad. 8 April, saw the squadron return to Qalat Sikar, once again in direct support of Task Force Tarawa. On 10 April, the squadron returned to An Numaniyah, still in direct support of Task Force Tarawa. On 25 April, the squadron relocated to Ad Diwaniyah in support of 1st Marine Division and remained there until 25 May when they returned to Al Kut. VMU-1 returned to the United States on 12 September 2003 having flown 414 sorties for 1414 flight hours, relocated on eight occasions, and convoyed more than 1000 road miles. For their exceptional achievement, VMU-1 was recognized with the Marine Corps Aviation Association’s prestigious James Maguire Award for 2003.

On 1 August 2004 VMU-1 returned to Iraq. Operating the Pioneer UAV from Camp Taqaddum, Iraq, the squadron detected and reported armed enemy personnel on 93 occasions, enemy weapons systems on 37 occasions, enemy personnel emplacing improvised explosive devices on 14 occasions, and enemy personnel preparing to ambush friendly personnel on six occasions. Perhaps the squadron’s most significant achievement however was its participation in Operation Phantom Fury between 7 and 19 November 2004. During that operation, the I Marine Expeditionary Force took back the city of Fallujah from insurgents. VMU-1 flew more than 50 sorties and 250 flight hours during the offensive and adjusted artillery, coordinated air strikes, and collected battle damage assessment against more than 50 targets in and around Fallujah. The squadron gained national attention for this effort in author Bing West’s article "Nowhere to Hide," featured as the cover story for the February 2005 issue of Popular Mechanics magazine. The essence of this article was later republished as a chapter in the same author’s best-selling book No True Glory, published in September 2005. VMU-1 returned to the United States on 4 March 2005 having flown 757 sorties for 3159 flight hours, a staggering total that equated to more than a decade’s worth of peacetime flight hours flown in only seven months.

VMU-1 returned to Iraq for a third time during August 2005. This deployment saw the integration of the SE-15 Scan Eagle UAV with the venerable Pioneer. Along with its Pioneer facility at Camp Taqaddum, VMU-1 fielded Scan Eagle Detachment Bravo at Camp Al Qaim near the Syrian border and Scan Eagle Detachment Charlie at Camp Al Asad. Of particular significance during the deployment was VMU-1’s participation in Operation Steel Curtain, the Regimental Combat Team 2 offensive to kill or capture insurgents and restore order in the Western Euphrates River Valley cities of Husaybah, Karabilah, Sadah, and Ubaydi during November 2005. The Watchdogs detected and positively identified more than 20 enemy combatants who were subsequently dispatched by friendly air power and helped coordinate more than 30 fixed and rotary-wing air strikes during the two-week battle. The VMU-1 Watchdogs flew 780 Pioneer sorties for 3215 flight hours, and 573 Scan Eagle sorties for 5261 flight hours during the deployment.

In October 2007, VMU-1 became the first squadron in the Marine Corps to begin flying the RQ-7 Shadow in combat in Iraq.

=== 2010s ===
On 1 October 2014, control of VMU-1 was administratively transferred from MACG-38 to Marine Aircraft Group 13 (MAG-13) at Marine Corps Air Station Yuma, Arizona.

During the summer of 2016, the squadron began the transition to the RQ-21A Blackjack.

During the fall of 2018, VMU-1 began to operate the MQ-9A Reaper on a contractor owned/contractor operated basis.

In 2019 While simultaneously transitioning to MQ-9A Reaper, VMU-1 was still tasked to partake in WESTPAC 21-1 with the 15th Marine Expeditionary unit for the last RQ-21 Blackjack deployment aboard the USS San Diego. The RQ-21 detachment departed October 2020 and returned May 2021. Upon return the maintenance department began their divestment of RQ-21 which allowed VMU-1 to solely focus on the integration of the MQ-9A Reaper into the Marine Corps.

=== 2020s ===
In the fall of 2021 VMU-1 accepted its first two MQ-9A aircraft becoming the first operationally ready MQ-9A squadron in the United States Marine Corps.

== See also ==
- List of active United States Marine Corps aircraft squadrons
- United States Marine Corps Aviation
- History of unmanned aerial vehicles
- "VMU-1 The Watchdogs" - An interview, photos, and information from 6 Oct. 2008 by reporter Joe Bennett.
