= Marine Corps Air Station Yuma =

US Marine Corps base in Yuma, Arizona, United States

- Yuma, Arizona in the United States
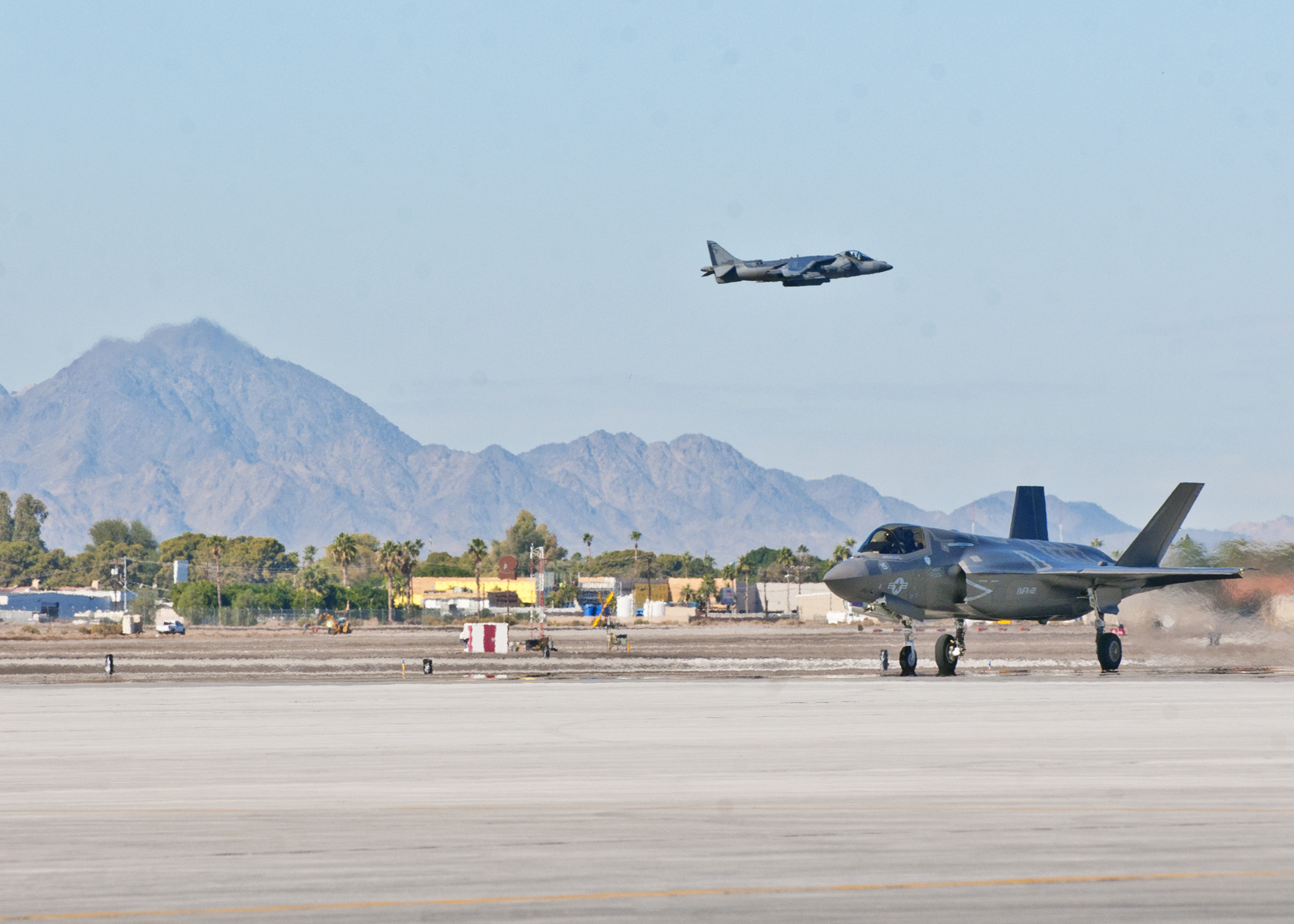
- The 3rd Marine Aircraft Wing's first F-35B Lightning II taxis on the flight-line at MCAS Yuma with an AV-8B Harrier II in the background

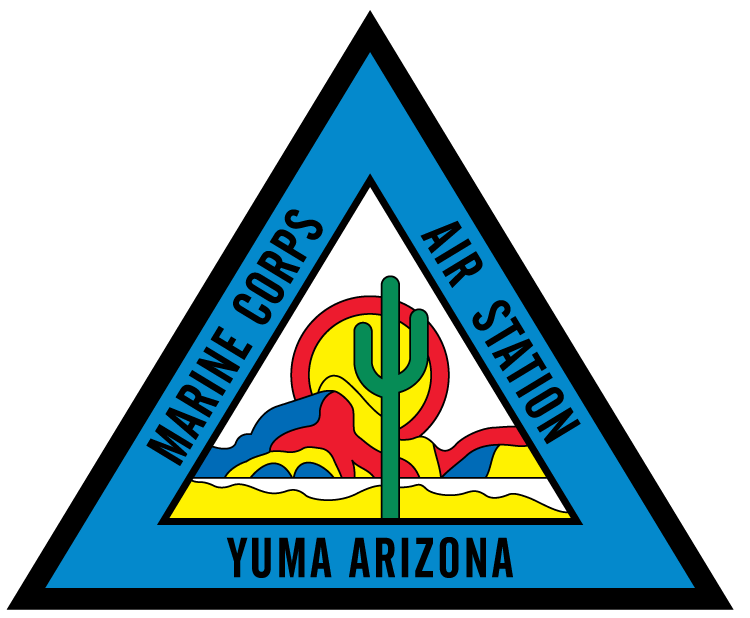

Site information
- Type: Marine Corps Air Station
- Owner: Department of Defense
- Operator: US Marine Corps
- Controlled by: 3rd Marine Aircraft Wing
- Condition: Operational
- Website: www.mcasyuma.marines.mil

Location
- Location in Arizona Location in the United States
- Coordinates: 32°39′24″N 114°36′22″W

Site history
- Built: 1928 (as Fly Field)
- In use: 1959 – present (by Marine Corps)

Garrison information
- Current commander: Colonel Charles E. Dudik
- Garrison: Marine Aircraft Group 13

Airfield information
- Identifiers: IATA: YUM, ICAO: KNYL, FAA LID: NYL, WMO: 699604
- Elevation: 64.9 metres (213 ft) AMSL
Runways
Direction	Length and surface
3L/21R	4,053.8 metres (13,300 ft) concrete
3R/21L	2,816 metres (9,239 ft) asphalt/concrete
8/26	1,873.3 metres (6,146 ft) asphalt/concrete
17/35	1,740.4 metres (5,710 ft) asphalt/concrete
- Other airfield facilities: 5x V/STOL pad
- Airfield shared with Yuma International Airport. Source: Federal Aviation Administration

Marine Corps Air Station Yuma or MCAS Yuma (IATA: YUM, ICAO: KNYL, FAA LID: NYL) is a United States Marine Corps air station in Yuma, Arizona. It is the home of multiple squadrons of F-35B Lightning IIs of the 3rd Marine Aircraft Wing, Marine Aviation Weapons and Tactics Squadron 1 (MAWTS-1), Marine Operational Test and Evaluation Squadron 1 (VMX-1) and Marine Fighter Training Squadron 401 (VMFT-401), an air combat adversary squadron of the 4th Marine Aircraft Wing of the Marine Corps Reserve. It is a designated Superfund site due to a number of soil and groundwater contaminants, including asbestos.

The station is 2 miles (1.7 nmi; 3.2 km) from the city center of Yuma. A joint use civilian-military airport, MCAS Yuma shares airfield facilities with Yuma International Airport and occupies approximately 3,000 acres (1,200 ha), most of which is flat desert. MCAS Yuma also operates an auxiliary airfield on the Barry M. Goldwater Range.

== History ==
=== Air Force use ===
In 1928, the federal government purchased 640 acres (260 ha) near Yuma at the recommendation of Colonel Benjamin F. Fly. Temporary dirt runways were installed for usage by military and civilian planes. It was called Fly Field.

The outbreak of World War II transformed the civilian airport into the Yuma Army Airfield. Construction of facilities began on 1 June 1942 and was activated on 15 December

Yuma AAF was a single-engine flight training school, operated by the Army Air Forces Flying Training Command, West Coast Training Center, later Western Flying Training Command. Flying training began in January 1943. Its training unit was the 307th Single Engine Flying Training Group which operated AT-6 Texans, reporting to the 37th Flying Training Wing. The base operating unit was the 403d Army Air Force Base Unit. In 1944, the unit was upgraded to multi-engine flight training, operating Martin B-26 Marauders. In addition to the flying training, a Flexible Gunnery School was established at the airfield in November 1943. Flight training was discontinued on 23 April 1945 and gunnery training on 31 May 1945.

The base was closed on 1 November 1945. After the war, the airfield was turned over to the Department of the Interior as a headquarters for the Bureau of Land Reclamation.

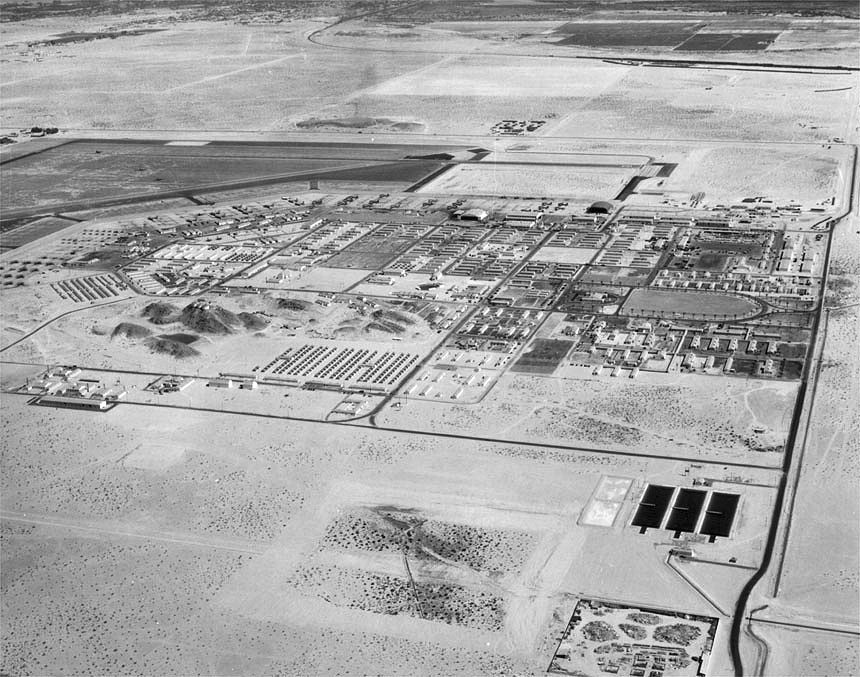
Yuma AAF, 1943

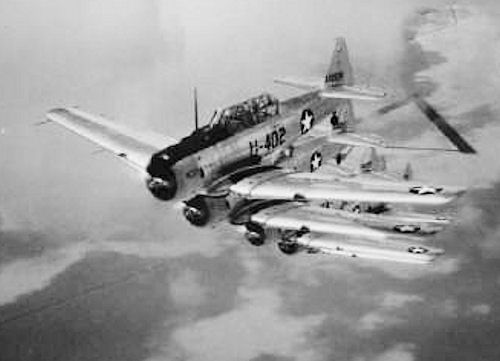
AT-6s from Yuma, 1943

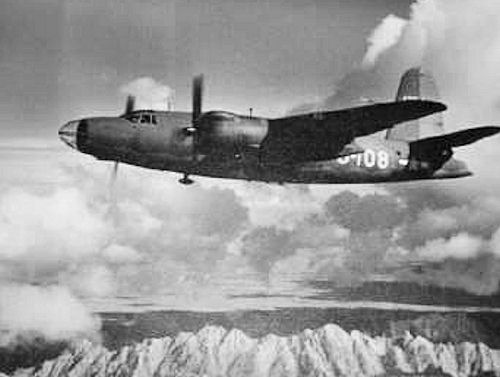
B-26 Marauder from Yuma, 1944

On 1 January 1954, Yuma County Airport was reactivated by the United States Air Force (USAF) Air Defense Command (ADC) as a training facility. In the mid-1950s, ADC was equipped almost solely with rocket-firing F-86D Sabre and F-89C Scorpion interceptors, and Headquarters USAF decided they should have their own training base.

Yuma Airport became the home of the 4750th Training Wing (Air Defense). The 4750th had two major components, the 4750th Training Group (Air Defense) and the 4750th Training Squadron. The group had two flying squadrons assigned – the 4750th TS equipped with six F-86D Sabres and six F-94C Scorpions: and the 4750th Tow Target Squadron equipped with twelve T-33As and eight B-45As used to tow targets for the live fire portion of the course.

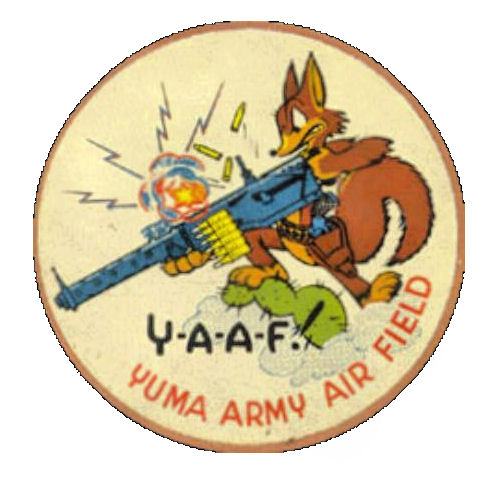
Patch from the Flexible Gunnery School, Yuma AAB

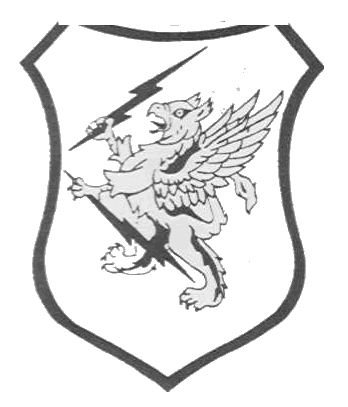
Emblem of the 4750th Air Defense Wing

The first ADC squadron arrived at Yuma for the Rocketry Proficiency Program on 1 February 1954. ADC squadrons rotated through Yuma on a regular basis for a two-week proficiency program that included live-fire exercises over the Williams AFB and Luke AFB gunnery ranges.

The two-week course included a controller course, many hours in the F-86D simulator and at least one 'live fire' mission flown each day. The targets, usually towed behind B-45A tow ships, were 9'x45' target sleeves, with two radar reflectors attached for the interceptor fire control systems to lock onto. Most of the TDY personnel were quartered in tents near the flight line, at least until April 1954 when the first permanent barracks buildings were finished and air conditioned. By June, seven ADC units had rotated through the Yuma program.

Also Headquarters USAF decided to add a separate air-to-air rocketry competition to the annual USAF gunnery meet that was held at Las Vegas Air Force Base (renamed Nellis Air Force Base in 1950). The Interceptor Phase of the competition would be held at Yuma between 20 June and 27 June 1954. The competition would take place each year, with the last occurring in 1956.

Several changes occurred during the last half of 1954. On 24 August, Yuma County Airport was redesignated Yuma Air Force Base. On 1 September, the 4750th Training Wing became the 4750th Air Defense Wing (Weapons). The 4750th Group and squadrons were also redesignated. And on 8 January 1955, the 4750th Tow Target Squadron became the 17th TTS. Between July 1954 and the end of the year, ADC rotated eleven more squadrons through the Yuma program – nine in F-86Ds, and one each in F-94Cs and F-89Ds.

On 1 January 1956, the 4750th Drone Squadron was established as part of the 4750th ADW (Weapons). They were equipped with the brand new Ryan Q-2A Firebee drone, which was launched from GB-26C Invader aircraft. Although the drones were in place by spring, the first GB-26Cs did not arrive until June, and the first Firebee flight took place in July. The Q-2A Firebees were recovered by H-21 helicopters after landing on the desert floor.

Yuma AFB was renamed on 13 October 1956 as Vincent Air Force Base, the installation was named for Brigadier General Clinton D. "Casey" Vincent, one of Major General Claire Chennault's top fighter leaders in the China-Burma Theater and the second youngest General Officer in U.S. Air Force history, receiving his star at the age of 29. Vincent was the subject of a TIME magazine article titled "Up Youth", which covered the meteoric promotions of the U.S. Army and USAF. Vincent was also an inspiration for the main character in the comic strip Terry and the Pirates. Vincent died of a heart attack in 1955 at the age of 40 while serving as the Deputy Chief of Staff for Operations, Air Defense Command (ADC) at Ent AFB, Colorado.

In addition to the fighter units, Vincent AFB was used by Air Defense Command as a general surveillance radar station. The 864th Aircraft Control and Warning Squadron began operations in 1956 using AN/MPS-7 and AN/MPS-14 radars, the site being designated as "SM-162".

In addition to the main facility, Vincent AFB operated several AN/FPS-14 Gap Filler sites:

- Tacna, AZ (SM-162A): 32°41′01″N 114°03′07″W
- Corn Springs, CA (SM-162B): 33°38′49″N 115°15′36″W
- Stone Cabin, AZ (SM-162C): 33°14′24″N 114°15′27″W
- Palo Verde, CA (SM-162D): 33°17′51″N 114°44′28″W

Fleet Air Gunnery Unit Pacific was moved before 1 July 1958 to MCAAS YUMA from NAS El Centro, California.

Vincent AFB was transferred to the U.S. Navy on 1 Jan 1959, and the tenant radar site was renamed Yuma Air Force Station. On 20 July 1962, the base designation was changed to Marine Corps Air Station. In this time frame, the USAF began construction of a new Yuma AFS (RSM-162) about 13 miles south of Yuma. However, the replacement site was never completed, as, in March 1963, the Air Force ordered the 864th AC&W Squadron to inactivate. Operations ceased 1 August 1963.

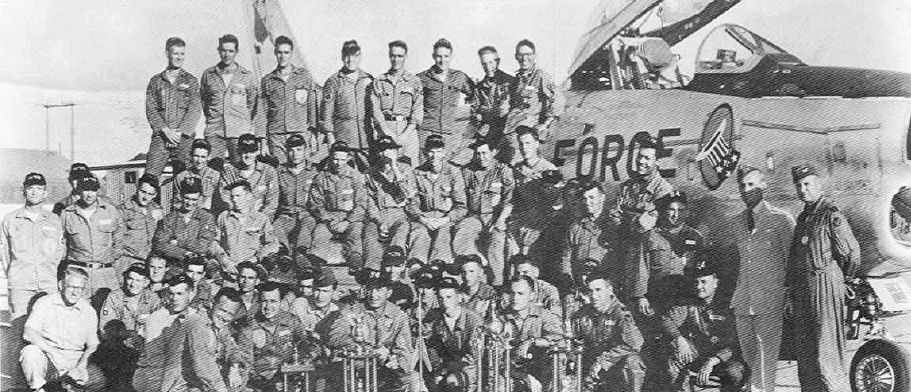
The Eastern Air Defense Force team (ADC), winners of the 1956 USAF Gunnery and Weapons Meet (Interceptor Phase) at Yuma

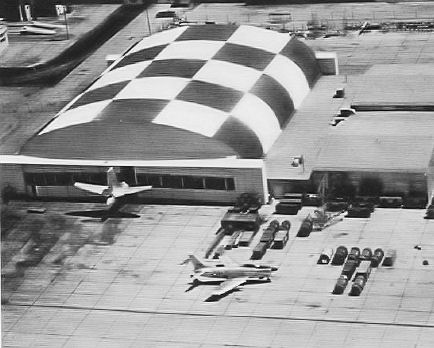
A hangar at Yuma AFB, with one of the B-45A target tugs inside

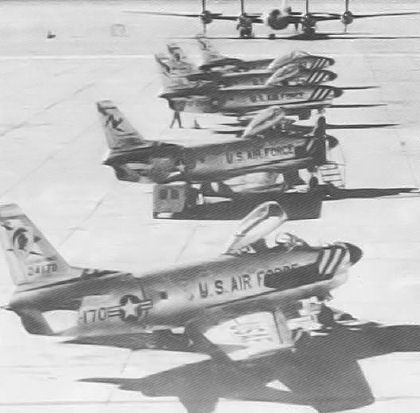
F-86Ds assigned to the 86th FIS at Youngstown Airport, Ohio, line the Yuma ramp in front of a TB-29A target tug during the summer of 1955.

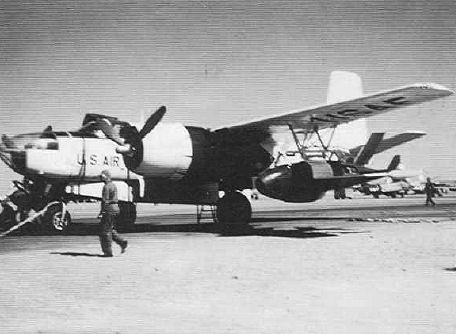
A Ryan Q-2A Firebee target drone under the wing of a 4750th ADS DB-26C launch aircraft at Yuma in 1956. Operations with the Q-2A drone began at Yuma in January 1956.

=== Marine Corps use ===
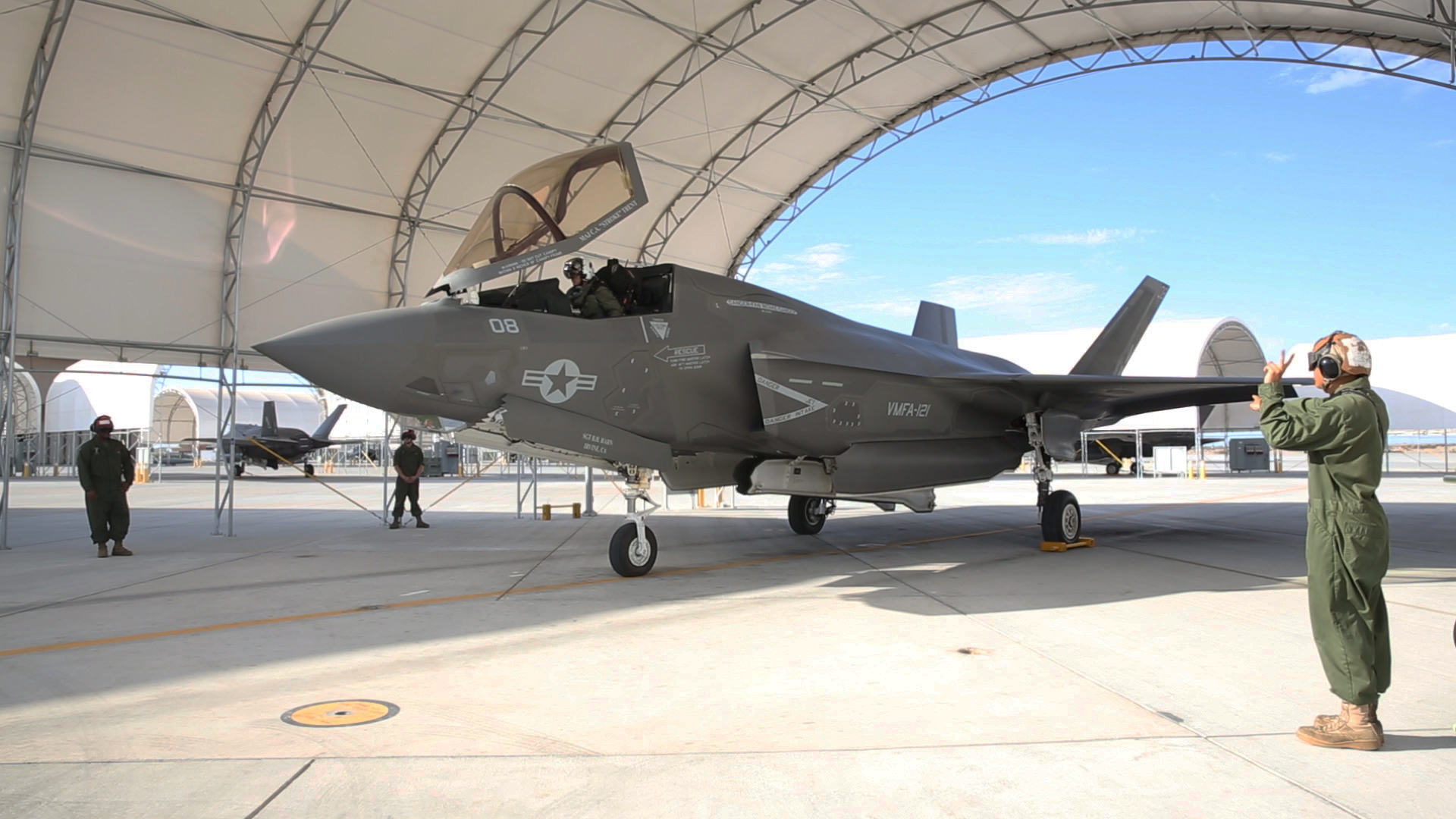
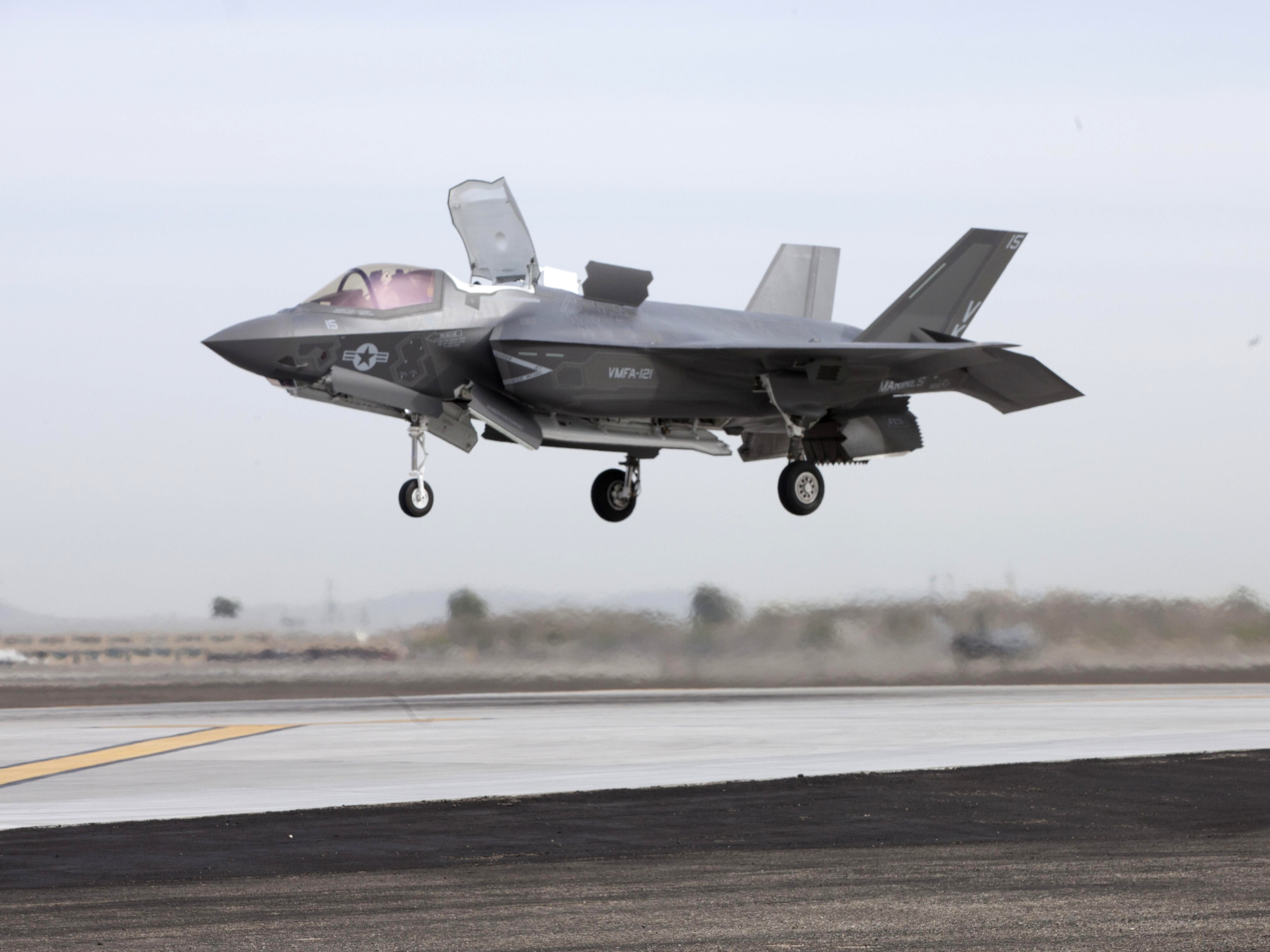
F-35Bs from VMFA-121 at MCAS Yuma

The 4750th Air Defense Wing was inactivated at Vincent AFB on 15 June 1959 and control of the base was passed over to the United States Navy. Nine days later the base was turned over to the United States Marine Corps (USMC). The base was renamed Marine Corps Air Station Yuma (Vincent Field) on 20 July 1962.

MCAS Yuma is currently the busiest air station in the Marine Corps, offering excellent year-round flying conditions and thousands of acres of open terrain for air-to-ground weapons ranges (including the Chocolate Mountain Aerial Gunnery Range and the Barry M. Goldwater Air Force Range- West), and associated restricted airspace for military flight operations. During the 1960s, 70s, and early 1980s, MCAS Yuma was home to VMFAT-101, the Marine Corps' Fleet Replacement Squadron (FRS) for the F-4 Phantom II, training USMC, U.S. Navy, and NATO/Allied flight crews and maintenance personnel in the F-4B, F-4J, F-4N, and F-4S. Following the transfer of VMFAT-101 to MCAS El Toro, California in the 1980s, MCAS Yuma became the principal Fleet Marine Force, Pacific operating base for the AV-8B Harrier II, under the cognizance of Marine Aircraft Group 13 (MAG-13).

Marine Aviation Weapons and Tactics Squadron 1 (MAWTS-1) is a major aviation command at MCAS Yuma, conducting training for all Marine Corps tactical aviation units, most notably the Weapons and Tactics Instructor (WTI) course. Marine Fighter Training Squadron 401 (VMFT-401) is a Marine Air Reserve squadron also based at MCAS Yuma, containing both active duty and Selected Marine Corps Reservists, providing aerial adversary/aggressor services and dissimilar air combat training (DACT) for all U.S. military services, and selected NATO, Allied, and Coalition partners. This base was also used in the late 1980s and early 1990s as the Marine Corps Airborne Training Center.

MCAS Yuma is currently programmed to become the Marine Corps' initial operating base for the F-35B STOVL variant of the F-35 Lightning II, the first of which arrived on 16 November 2012.

== Tenant Squadrons ==
Flying units based at MCAS Yuma.

Insignia	Squadron	Code	Callsign/Nickname	Assigned Aircraft	Operational Assignment
	Marine Fighter Attack Squadron 214	VMFA-214	The Blacksheep	F-35B	3rd Marine Aircraft Wing (3rd MAW)
	Marine Fighter Attack Squadron 211	VMFA-211	Wake Island Defenders	F-35B	3rd Marine Aircraft Wing (3rd MAW)
	Marine Fighter Attack Squadron 122	VMFA-122	Werewolves	F-35B	3rd Marine Aircraft Wing (3rd MAW)
	Marine Fighter Attack Squadron 225	VMFA-225	Vikings	F-35B	3rd Marine Aircraft Wing (3rd MAW)
	Marine Operational Test and Evaluation Squadron 1	VMX-1	Storm	F-35B, MV-22, CH-53, RQ-21B, AH-1, UH-1Y	Commander, Operational Test and Evaluation Force (COMOPTEVFOR)
	Marine Fighter Training Squadron 401	VMFT-401	Snipers	F-5N	4th Marine Aircraft Wing (4th MAW)
	Marine Unmanned Aerial Vehicle Squadron 1	VMU-1	Watchdogs	MQ-9A	3rd Marine Aircraft Wing (3rd MAW)

== Based units ==
Flying and notable non-flying units based at MCAS Yuma.

=== United States Marine Corps ===
Marine Corps Installations – West

- Headquarters and Headquarters Squadron – UC-12F Huron

3rd Marine Aircraft Wing

- Marine Aircraft Group 13
  - Marine Aviation Logistics Squadron 13 (MALS-13)
  - Marine Fighter Attack Squadron 214 (VMFA-214) – F-35B Lightning II
  - Marine Fighter Attack Squadron 122 (VMFA-122) – F-35B Lightning II
  - Marine Fighter Attack Squadron 211 (VMFA-211) – F-35B Lightning II
  - Marine Fighter Attack Squadron 225 (VMFA-225) – F-35B Lightning II
  - Marine Unmanned Aerial Vehicle Squadron 1 (VMU-1) – MQ-9A Reaper
  - Marine Wing Support Squadron 371 (MWSS-371)
- Marine Air Control Group 38
  - Marine Air Control Squadron 1 (MACS-1)

4th Marine Aircraft Wing

- Marine Aircraft Group 41
  - Marine Fighter Training Squadron 401 (VMFT-401) – F-5F/N Tiger II

Deputy Commandant for Aviation, Headquarters, U.S. Marine Corps

- Marine Operational Test and Evaluation Squadron 1 (VMX-1) – AH-1Z Viper, MV-22B Osprey, MQ-9A Reaper, CH-53K King Stallion and UH-1Y Huey, Lockheed Martin F-35 Lightning II

Training and Education Command

- Marine Aviation Weapons and Tactics Squadron 1 (MAWTS-1)

== Education ==
There are no schools for dependent children that are located directly on post. Liberty Military Housing is assigned to schools in the Yuma Elementary School District and Yuma Union High School District. Zoned elementary and middle schools for that housing are James B. Rolle Elementary School and R. Pete Woodard Junior High School. Kofa High School is the zoned high school for Liberty. 16th Street Military Housing is assigned to schools in the Crane Elementary School District and the Yuma UHSD. Zoned elementary and middle schools for that housing are Ronald Reagan Elementary School and Centennial Middle School. Cibola High School is the zoned high school for 16th street.

== See also ==
- Yuma International Airport
- Arizona World War II Army Airfields
- List of United States Marine Corps installations
- List of USAF Aerospace Defense Command General Surveillance Radar Stations

== Additional bibliography ==
- Manning, Thomas A. (2005), History of Air Education and Training Command, 1942–2002. Office of History and Research, Headquarters, AETC, Randolph AFB, Texas OCLC 71006954, 29991467
- Shaw, Frederick J. (2004), Locating Air Force Base Sites, History’s Legacy, Air Force History and Museums Program, United States Air Force, Washington DC. OCLC 57007862, 1050653629
