= Chu Lai Air Base =

US Marine Corps military airport in Vietnam

Chu Lai Air Base
- Part of Chu Lai Base Area
- Chu Lai, Quảng Nam Province in Vietnam
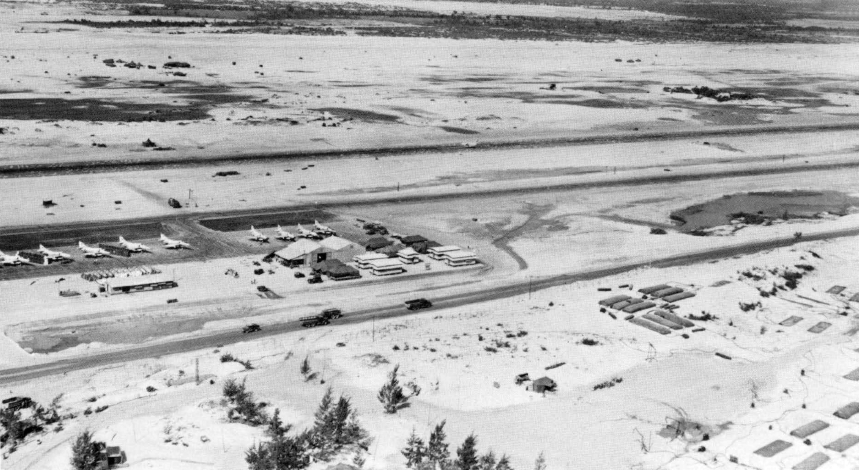

Site information
- Operator: United States Marine Corps (USMC); United States Army (US ARMY)

Location
- Coordinates: 15.455°N 108.69°E

Site history
- Built: 1965
- In use: 1965-1972
- Battles/wars: Vietnam War; Operation Starlite

Airfield information
- Elevation: 1,759 feet (536 m) AMSL
Runways
Direction	Length and surface
	10,000 feet (3,048 m) Concrete

Chu Lai Air Base was a military airport in Chu Lai, Vietnam, operated by the United States Marine Corps between 1965 and 1970. It was located near Tam Kỳ city, the largest city in Quảng Tín Province. Abandoned after the end of the Vietnam War, it was reopened as Chu Lai Airport in 2005.

First squadron to land at Chu Lai was VMA-225 (pre-arranged) 1 June 1965 along with VMA-311 arriving simultaneously. No A-4 Squadrons at that time were All Weather. VMA-225 was equipped with the A-4C model, and VMA-311 with the A-4E.

== History ==
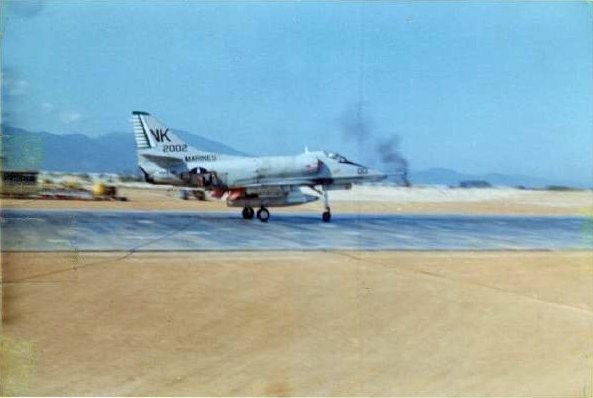
A VMA-121 A-4E making an arrested landing at Chu Lai, March 1967

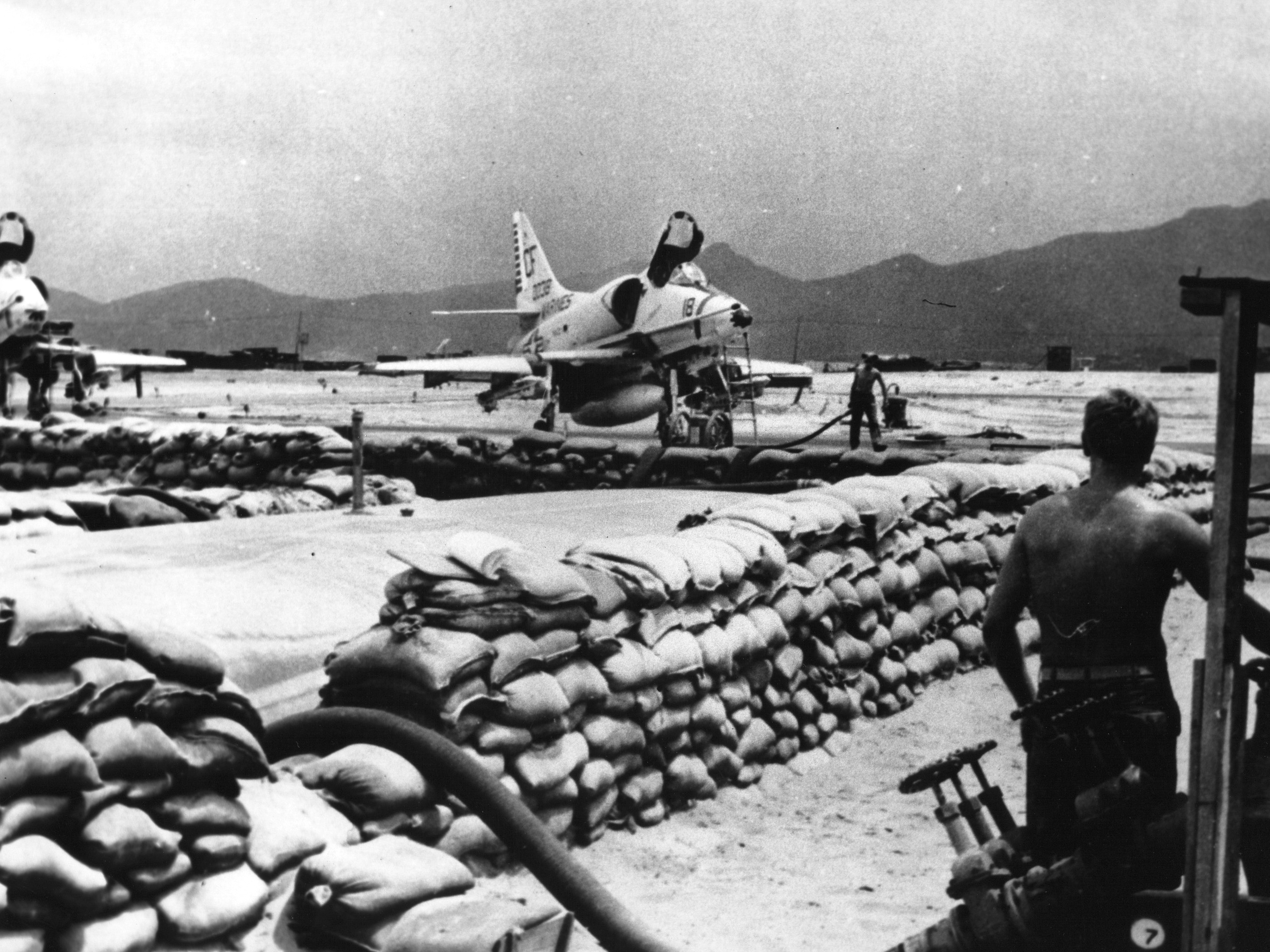
Two VMA-211 A4-Es refuel at Chu Lai, 12 July 1967

On 8 March 1965, the U.S. 9th Marine Expeditionary Brigade landed at Da Nang to protect the Da Nang Air Base from possible communist attack.

On 6 May units from the Army of the Republic of Vietnam (ARVN) 2nd Division and 3rd Battalion, 9th Marines secured the Chu Lai area. On 7 May, the 3rd Marine Expeditionary Brigade (3rd MEB), composed of the 4th Marine Regiment, 3rd Reconnaissance Battalion, elements of Marine Aircraft Group 12 (MAG-12) and Naval Mobile Construction Battalion 10 landed at Chu Lai to establish a jet-capable airfield and base area.

At first, only a "short airfield for tactical support (SATS)" was installed. The SATS consisted of a 1,200 metres (3,900 ft) runway with an aluminum surface of interlocking lightweight metal alloy planking, a catapult and a carrier deck-type arresting gear. It also included a tactical airfield fuel dispensing system.

The base of soft sand at Chu Lai caused much difficulty with the installation of the SATS, but the first landing of an Douglas A-4 Skyhawk was made on 1 June 1965, by Colonel John D. Noble, Commanding Officer of MAG-12 from Marine All- Weather Fighter Attack Squadron 242 (VMA-225) landed. On the same day, the first combat mission was flown, led by Lieutenant Colonel R. W. Baker, CO of VMA-225. The aircraft took off using jet-assisted takeoff rockets on the partially completed runway as the Seabees continued lengthening the runway. It was involved in Operation Starlite on 18 August 1965, when the Marines made a pre-emptive strike on gathering National Liberation Front of South Vietnam (NLF) forces who were preparing to attack the base.

By mid-October 1965, the base was home to more than 80 A-4 Skyhawks from MAG-12.

On the night of 27 October 1965 the NLF penetrated the air base destroying 2 A-4s and severely damaging a further six. The Marines killed 15 of the attacking 20-man sapper squad.

In September 1966, a new 10,000 feet (3,000 m) runway, with taxiways, was completed, just west of the SATS strip. With the opening of the new runway, Marine Aircraft Group 13 with three McDonnell Douglas F-4 Phantom II squadrons arrived at Chu Lai and remained until September 1970.

In April 1967, Marine All-Weather Fighter Attack Squadron 533 (VMA(AW)-533), equipped with the Grumman A-6A Intruder all-weather attack aircraft, arrived to provide air support for Marines in I Corps, and to deliver ordinance on targets in North Vietnam under all weather conditions.

On the morning of 31 January 1968 as part of the Tet Offensive, the NLF attacked the base with rockets and mortars triggering an explosion in the bomb dump. MAGs 12 and 13 suffered three aircraft destroyed and 23 damaged.

The last Marine sorties were flown from Chu Lai by aircraft from Marine Fighter Attack Squadron 314 (VMFA-314) on 11 September 1970.

From 1967 the 54th Medical Detachment (Helicopter Ambulance) with Bell UH-1D Huey's were deployed here.

A PAVN rocket attack on the base on the night of 4/5 May 1970 resulted in 12 U.S. killed and 33 wounded.

The Marines departed Chu Lai on 13 October 1970, turning control over to the United States Army.
