= John P. Condon =

American Major general

John Pomeroy Condon
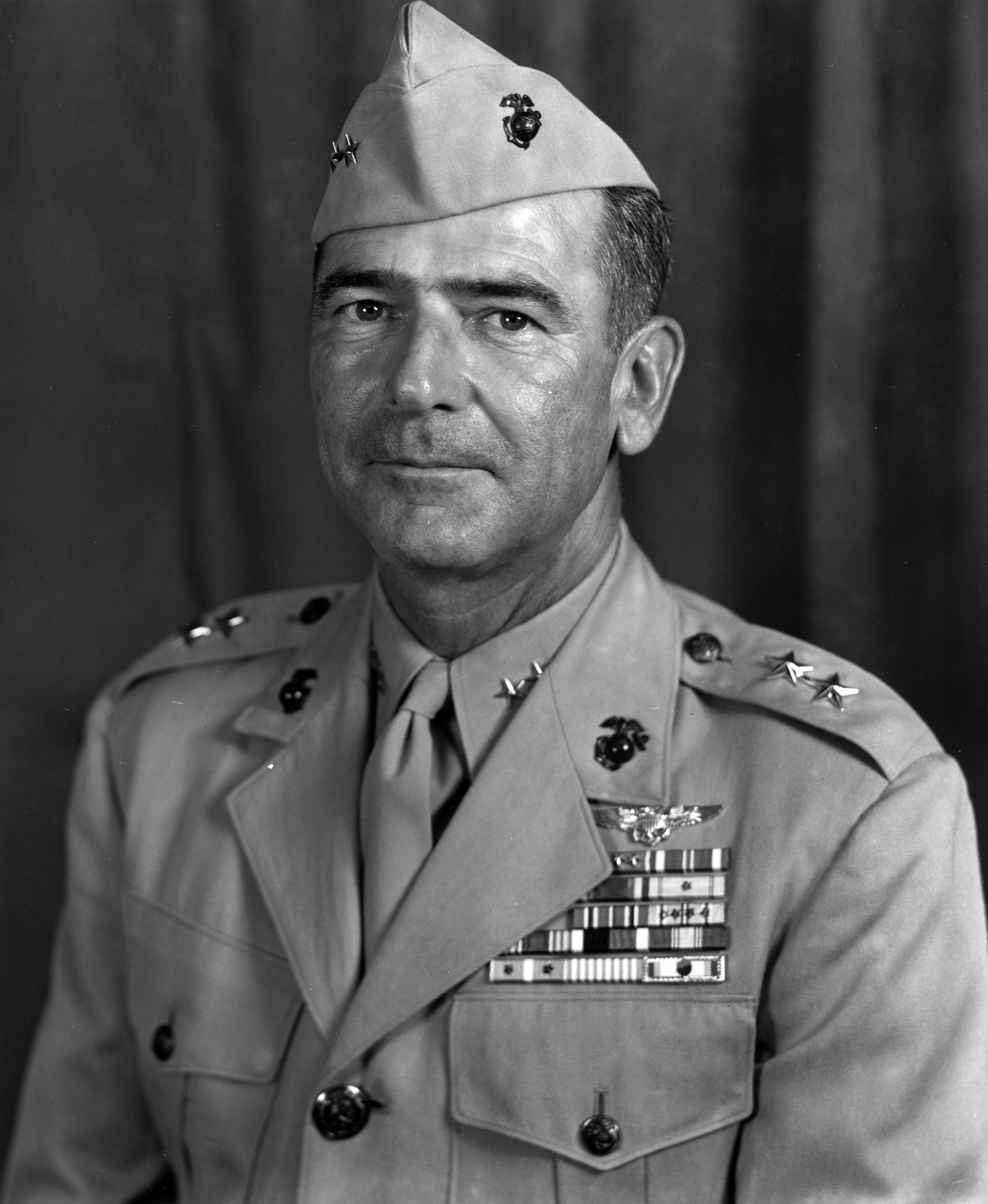
- Condon as Major general, USMC
- Born: December 20, 1911; Hancock, Michigan, US
- Died: December 26, 1996 (aged 85); Alexandria, Virginia, US
- Burial place: United States Naval Academy Cemetery
- Military career
- Allegiance: United States
- Branch: United States Marine Corps
- Service years: 1934–1962
- Rank: Major general
- Service number: 0-4986
- Commands: 3rd Marine Aircraft Wing; 1st Marine Aircraft Wing; Marine Aircraft Group 12; Marine Aircraft Group 14; Marine Aircraft Group 33; VMA-311
- Conflicts: Nicaraguan Campaign; World War II: Solomon Islands campaign; Bougainville campaign; Neutralisation of Rabaul; Battle of Okinawa; Korean War
- Awards: Legion of Merit (4); Distinguished Flying Cross

John Pomeroy Condon (December 20, 1911 – December 26, 1996) was a highly decorated aviator in the United States Marine Corps with the rank of major general. He distinguished himself successively during World War II and Korea and completed his career as commanding general, 3rd Marine Aircraft Wing in October 1962.

During World War II, he was instrumental in the planning of Operation Vengeance, the American military operation to kill Admiral Isoroku Yamamoto of the Imperial Japanese Navy on April 18, 1943.

== Early career ==
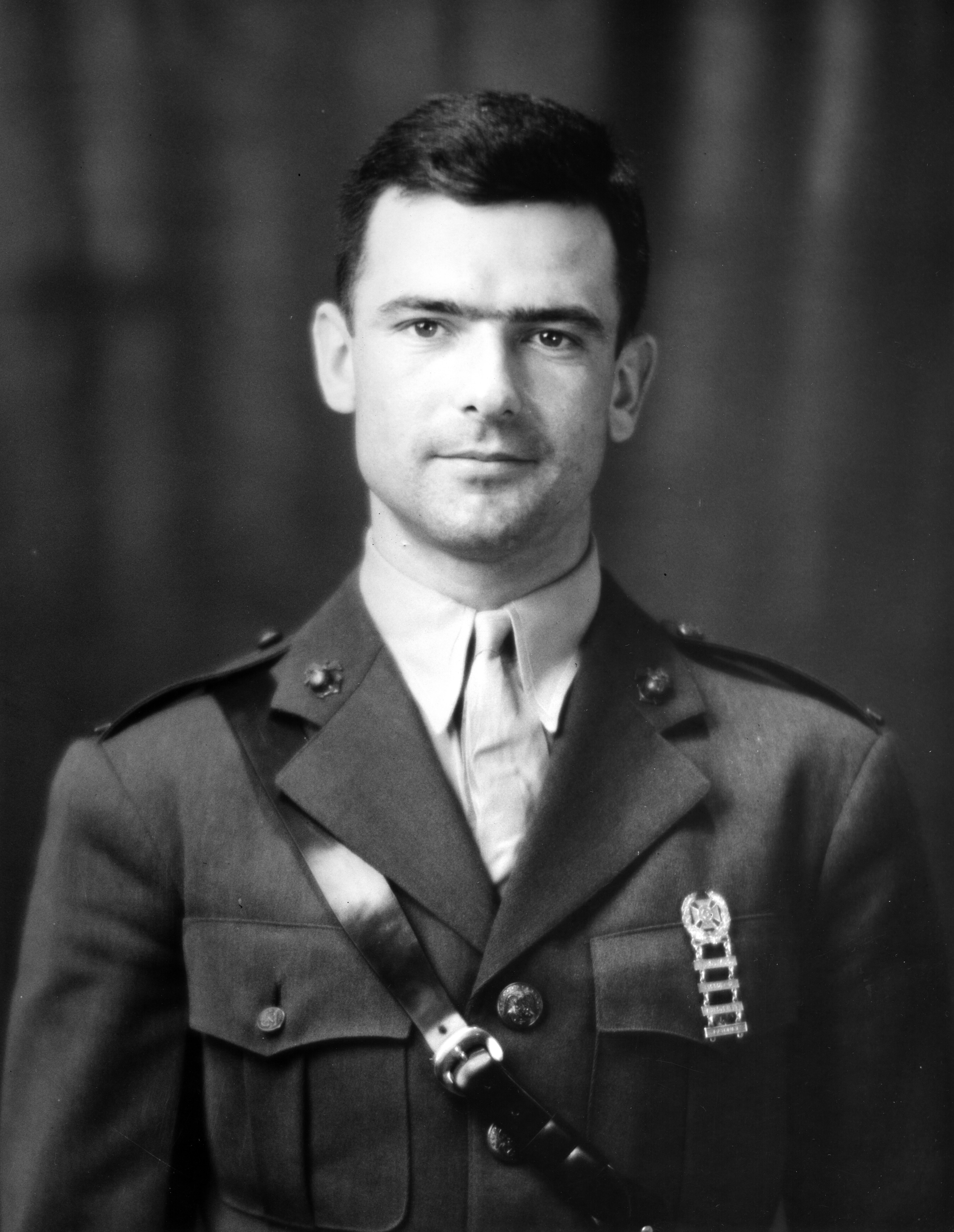
Condon during flight training in January 1937 at the Pensacola, Florida, Naval Air Station

John P. Condon was born on December 20, 1911, in Hancock, Michigan, the son of John Chassell Condon and Louise Richards Pomeroy. He graduated from the Houghton High School and subsequently enrolled at Severn Preparatory school, a preparatory school for the Naval Academy, where he spent one year, before he was admitted to the United States Naval Academy in Annapolis, Maryland, in June 1930.

While at the academy, Condon was active in lacrosse and was awarded "N" for excellence in that sport. He also captained the Navy Lacrosse team in his senior year. Many of his classmates became general officers later including Henry W. Buse Jr., Victor H. Krulak, Harold O. Deakin, Ralph K. Rottet, Frank C. Tharin, Gordon Chung-Hoon, Henry G. Sanchez, Samuel R. Shaw and John E. Weber.

Condon graduated with a Bachelor of Science degree on May 31, 1934, and was commissioned second lieutenant in the Marine Corps. He was then ordered to the Basic School at Philadelphia Navy Yard for Marine Corps officer instruction, which he completed in June the following year. Condon was subsequently assigned to the marine detachment aboard the battleship USS Pennsylvania and took part in the patrol cruises off the coast of California. He was detached in June 1936 and sent to San Diego, where he joined 6th Marine Regiment as Machine Gun Platoon leader, Company H, 2nd Battalion.

Service with ground unit was not what Condon expected and he requested flight training. His request was granted and he was ordered to Naval Air Station Pensacola, Florida, in October 1936. During his instruction there, he met Jane Anson, a member of a prominent Pensacola family, whom he married a few months later. He was promoted to first lieutenant on May 31, 1937.

Condon earned his wings and was designated Naval aviator in December 1937 and joined Marine Fighting Squadron 1 (VMF-1) stationed at Marine Corps Base Quantico. He served successively under Majors William L. McKittrick and William O. Brice (both future Marine generals) and his duty with VMF-1 consisted mostly of instruction in fighter plane tactics. Condon was promoted to captain on August 14, 1939.

== World War II ==
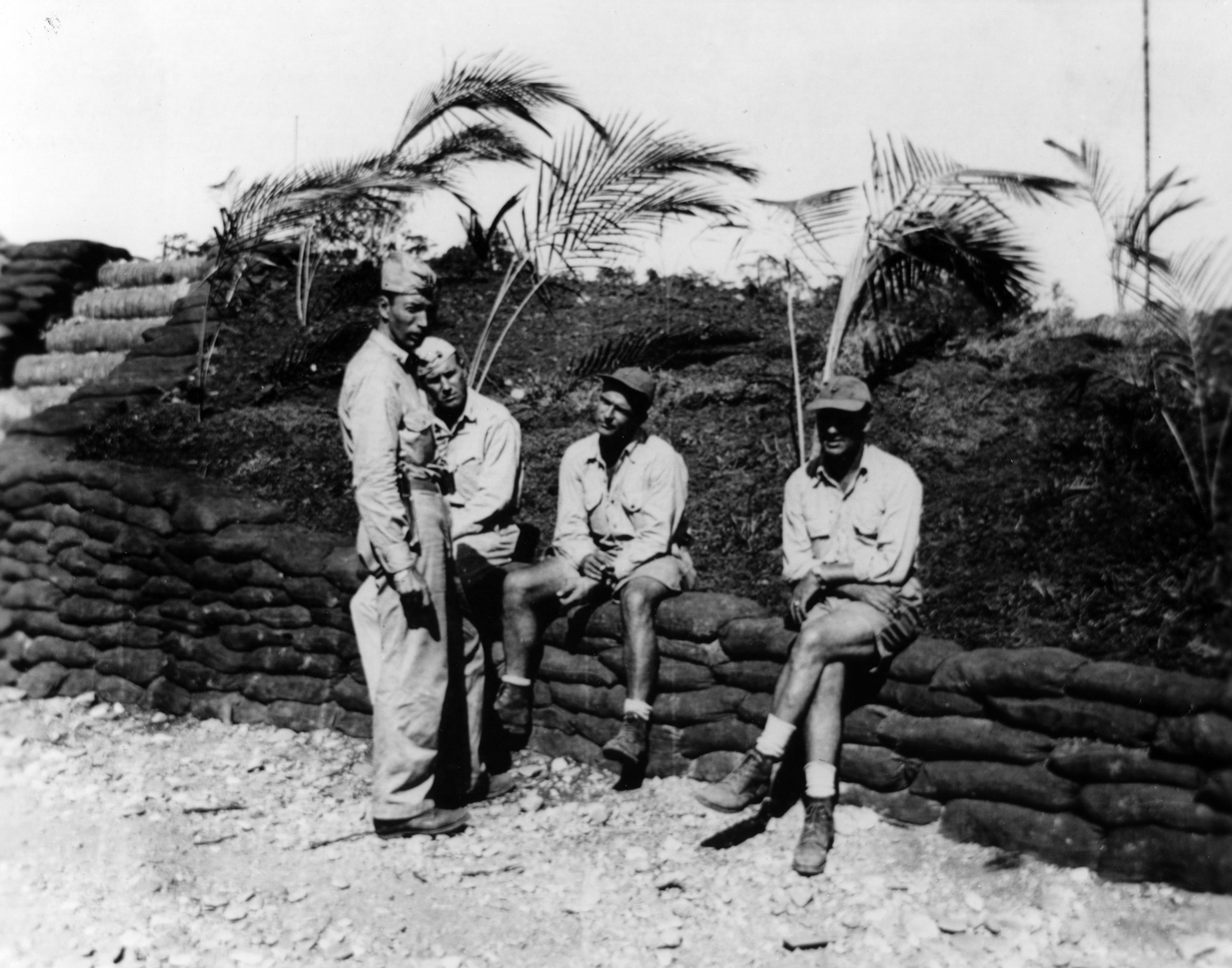
Condon (seated center) talking with staff officers of Fighter Command, Aircraft Solomons on Guadalcanal in early 1943

In June 1941, Condon was transferred to the newly activated Marine Fighting Squadron 121 (VMF-121) in Quantico and assumed duty as the squadron's executive officer. The squadron was transferred to Hawaii shortly before the Japanese attack on Pearl Harbor in late 1941 and was attached to the Marine Aircraft Group 12 (MAG-12) under Condon's friend and former colleague from Quantico, now Colonel William O. Brice. Condon was transferred to the group's headquarters and assumed duty as operations officer. For his new assignment, he was promoted to the temporary ranks of major on May 8, 1942, and to lieutenant colonel on October 10, 1942.

The MAG-12 was transferred to Nouméa in New Caledonia in December 1942 and then to Efate in the New Hebrides and conducted air operations during the Solomon Islands campaign. Condon served in this capacity until February 1943, when he was transferred to the staff of Fighter Commander, Aircraft Solomons (AirSols) under Colonel Edward L. Pugh.

In early April 1943, U.S. Naval Intelligence intercepted a Japanese message that the senior Japanese admiral, Isoroku Yamamoto, was to make an inspection tour of Japanese bases in the Rabaul-Bougainville area. Condon and Pugh were called up by Rear Admiral Marc Mitscher, in command of Aircraft Solomons (AirSols), who briefed them about the message and ordered them to analyse and prepare a plan to intercept Yamamoto's flight. After a day of planning, it was decided that the mission would be executed by 339th Fighter Squadron, equipped with P-38s. They intercepted Yamamoto's plane and shot him down at Bougainville on April 18, 1943, killing all on board, including Yamamoto. For his service with Fighter command, AirSols and the planning of Yamamoto's death, Condon was decorated with the Legion of Merit.

Condon then participated in the Bougainville campaign in November and December 1943 and subsequently supervised the construction of the Piva strips and directed the operations of Allied aircraft which rose from the new airfield to strike Rabaul. For his service on Bougainville, Condon received his second Legion of Merit.

In January 1944, he was ordered back to the United States and joined the Marine Base Defense Aircraft Group 45 at Marine Corps Air Station Miramar, California, as its executive officer. Condon was later transferred to Marine Aircraft Support Group 48 and served again as its executive officer during the training and qualifying marine squadrons for service on board escort carriers.

He returned to Pacific theater in May 1945 and joined the Marine Aircraft Group 33 as executive officer during the later phase of the Battle of Okinawa. Condon was later appointed temporary commander of Marine Aircraft Group 14, before he was transferred to Marine Aircraft Group 31 and participated in the occupation of Japan at Yokosuka.

== Korea and later career ==
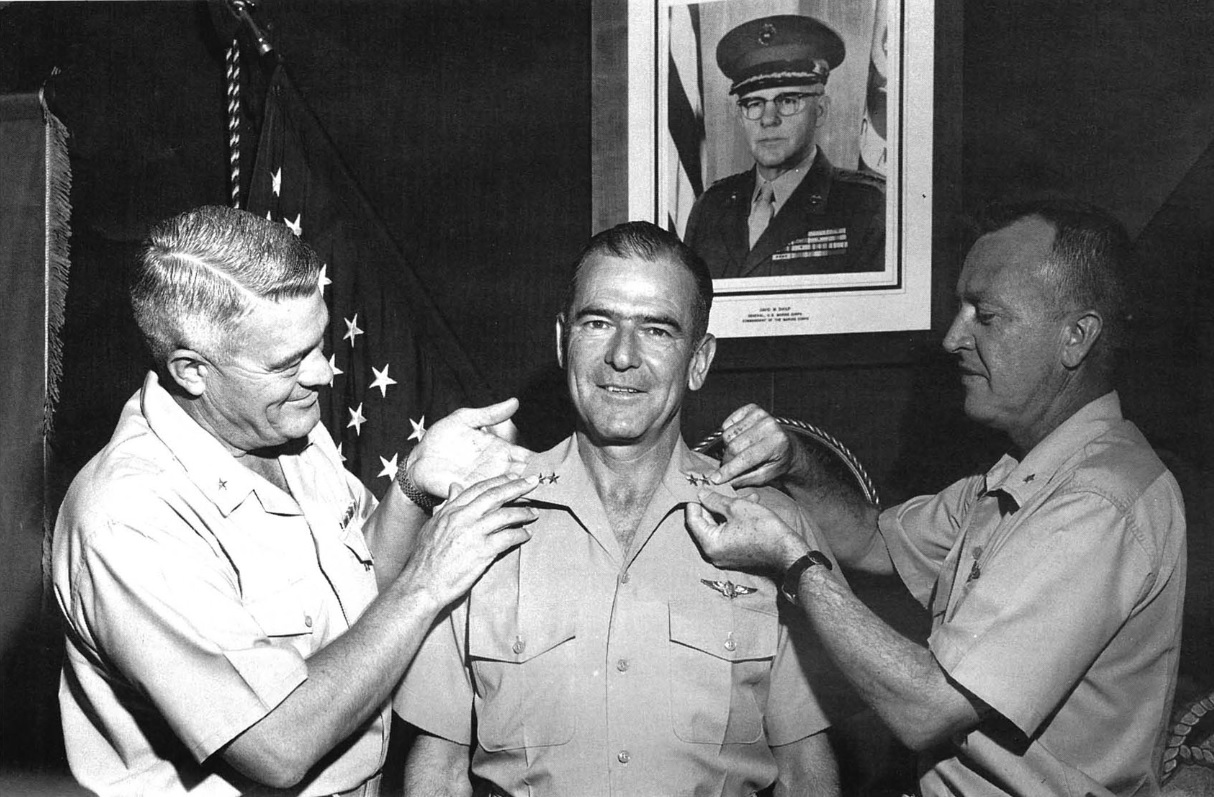
Condon's new two-star insiginia are pinned on by, from left, Marine Corps BGen Thomas F. Riley and assistant wing commander BGen Roy L. Kline

Condon returned with MAG-31 to the United States in July 1946 and was ordered to Washington, D.C., where he served in the Office of the Deputy Chief of Naval Operations for Air (Military Requirements). He spent two years in this capacity, when he was sent to Marine Corps Air Station El Toro, California, in April 1948. While there, he assumed command of Marine Attack Squadron 311 and supervised the squadron's transition to jet aircraft. It became the first West Coast Marine jet squadron when it started flying the TO-1 Shooting Star.

In July 1949, Condon was promoted to colonel and ordered to the Air War College at Maxwell Air Force Base in Montgomery, Alabama, where he completed the senior course in June 1950. He was subsequently sent to Washington, D.C., and attached to the Office of the Secretary of Defense under George Marshall as a member of the Weapons Systems Evaluation Group.

By the end of May 1952, during the ongoing Korean War, Condon was ordered to the Far East and assumed command of Marine Aircraft Group 33 at Pohang in Korea. His group contained two fighter squadrons equipped with Vought F4U Corsairs, one night squadron equipped with night-fighting versions of the Corsair and the Grumman F7F Tigercat; and an observation squadron equipped with Stinson L-5 Sentinel observation planes and Sikorsky H-5 helicopters. He operated his group during the close air support missions and also provided rescue and reconnaissance. Condon remained in Korea until the end of January 1953 and received his third Legion of Merit with Combat "V", a Distinguished Flying Cross and Navy Unit Commendation for the performance of the unit under his command.

Condon then returned to the United States and was assigned to the Special Board to examine the structure of Marine Corps Aviation. He was there for a few months before he was ordered to the Marine Corps Base Quantico, Virginia, and appointed a member of the Advanced Research Group, tasked with the development of recommendations on how the Marine air-ground task force should evolve structurally to meet the challenges of atomic warfare and new technologies such as helicopters and jet aircraft. Other members of the group were Thomas J. Coolley, August Larson Joseph N. Renner, Carson A. Roberts, Samuel R. Shaw, George R. E. Shell, Eustace R. Smoak, William J. Van Ryzin and Richard G. Weede.

In mid-1956, Condon was detached from the group and appointed chief of staff, Marine Corps Education Center at Quantico. He remained there for two years, before he was transferred to the Marine Corps Air Station Cherry Point, North Carolina, and assumed duty as chief of staff, 2nd Marine Aircraft Wing under Major General John C. Munn.

Condon was selected for the rank of brigadier general in April 1958 and ordered to Paris, France, for duty as deputy director for operations, J-3 Division, Headquarters, United States European Command under General Lauris Norstad. He served in this capacity until April 1961 and was praised by his superior for "a high degree of leadership, professional skill and enthusiasm". Condon received a fourth Legion of Merit for his service in Paris.

Following his return to the US, Condon received a new assignment as commanding general, 1st Marine Aircraft Wing at Iwakuni Air Base, Japan. His wing served as a special task force of the Seventh Fleet and Condon was promoted to major general in June 1961. He was ordered back to the United States in June 1962 and assumed command of 3rd Marine Aircraft Wing at Marine Corps Air Station El Toro, California.

== Retirement ==
Condon retired at his own request on October 1, 1962, after 28 years of Marine Corps service and accepted a job with the North American Aviation as program manager. Following the merger with Rockwell International in 1967, he assumed the capacity of executive of the division of that company and held additional duty as president of the National Alliance of Businessmen. Condon also earned a master's degree and a Ph.D. in administration from the University of California, Irvine.

He retired from Rockwell in 1976 and settled in Alexandria, Virginia, with his wife. Since his second retirement, Condon was active within the Marine Corps Historical Center at Washington Navy Yard and the Marine Corps Historical Foundation. Condon was later the president and chairman of the foundation and received its Heritage Award in recognition of "his accomplishments in the Marine Corps, his lifetime interest in Marine Corps history, and his services to the Foundation".

Condon died of an aneurysm and lymphoma at his home in Alexandria, Virginia on December 26, 1996, aged 85. He was buried with full military honors at United States Naval Academy Cemetery together with his wife Jane and infant son, John. They have another four daughters: Aline, Mary, Jan and Catherine.

== Decorations ==
Major General Condon's personal decorations include:

Naval Aviator Badge
1st Row	Legion of Merit with three 5/16" Gold Stars and Combat "V"	Distinguished Flying Cross	Navy Unit Commendation
2nd Row	American Defense Service Medal with Base Clasp	American Campaign Medal	Asiatic-Pacific Campaign Medal with four 3/16 inch service stars
3rd Row	World War II Victory Medal	Navy Occupation Service Medal	National Defense Service Medal with one service star
4th Row	Korean Service Medal with two 3/16 inch service stars	United Nations Korea Medal	Korean Presidential Unit Citation

== See also ==
- Isoroku Yamamoto
- List of 1st Marine Aircraft Wing commanders

Military offices
Preceded by Avery R. Kier	Commanding general, 3rd Marine Aircraft Wing; July 31, 1962 - October 1, 1962	Succeeded by Frank C. Tharin
Preceded by Avery R. Kier	Commanding general, 1st Marine Aircraft Wing; June 1961 - July 1962	Succeeded by Frederick E. Leek
