= Ralph K. Rottet =

American Lieutenant general

Ralph Kaspar Rottet
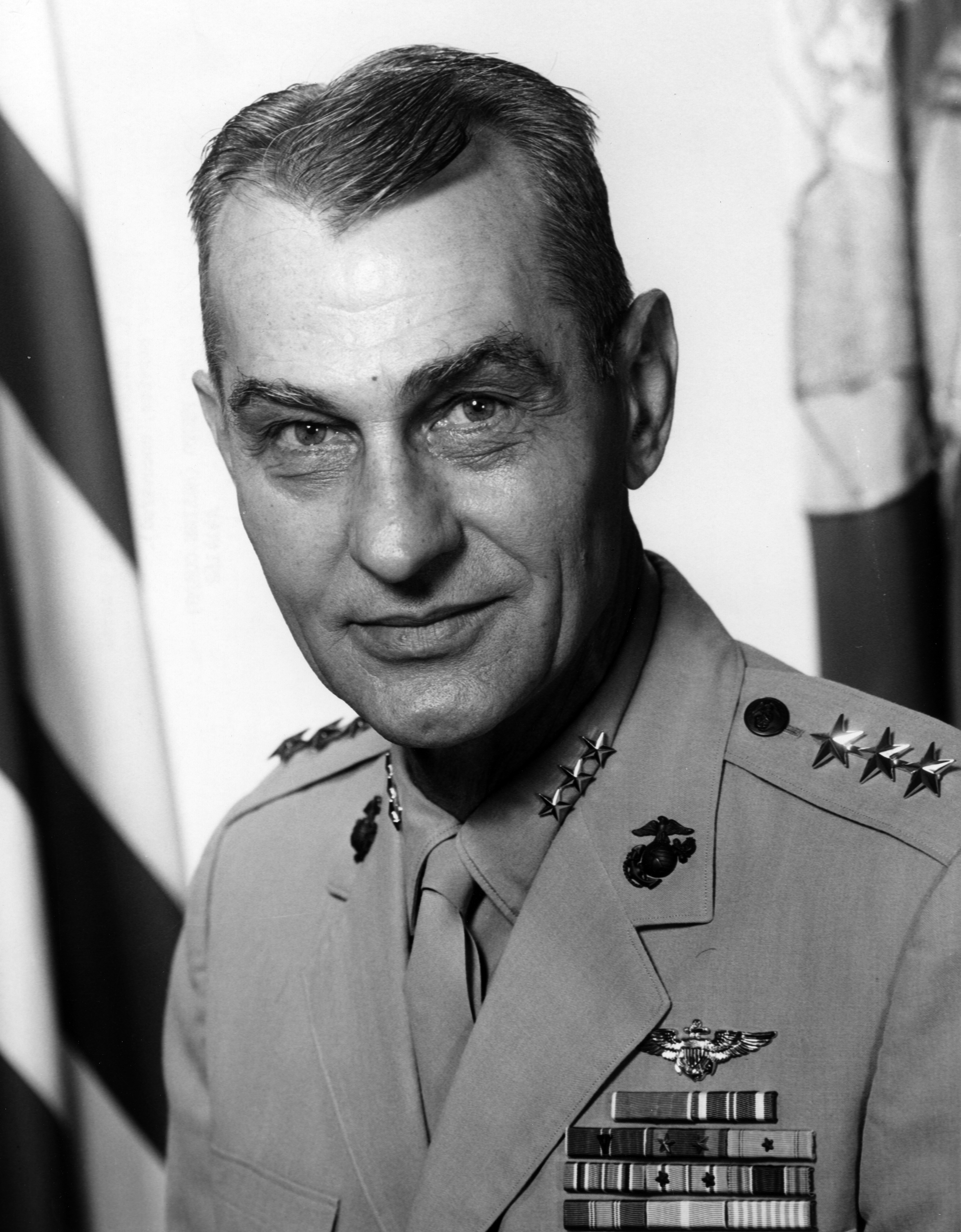
- Rottet as Lieutenant general, USMC
- Born: February 25, 1911; Jasper, Indiana, US
- Died: November 26, 1971 (aged 60); Camp Lejeune, North Carolina, US
- Military career
- Allegiance: United States of America
- Branch: United States Marine Corps
- Service years: 1934-1968
- Rank: Lieutenant General
- Nickname: "Rolo"
- Service number: 0-4988
- Commands: 2nd Marine Aircraft Wing; MCAS Cherry Point; Marine Aircraft Group 31; Marine Fighting Squadron 311
- Conflicts: World War II: Marshall Islands campaign; Mariana Islands campaign; Korean War
- Awards: Distinguished Service Medal; Distinguished Flying Cross; Legion of Merit (2); Bronze Star Medal; Air Medal (3)

Ralph Kaspar Rottet (February 25, 1911 – November 26, 1971) was a decorated officer and naval aviator in the United States Marine Corps with the rank of lieutenant general. He was a commanding officer in Marine Aircraft Group 31 during World War II and later became Deputy Chief of Staff for Plans and Programs at Headquarters Marine Corps in 1968.

== Early career ==
Ralph K. Rottet was born on February 25, 1911, in Jasper, Indiana, to John Fredrick Rottet, a cabinet maker, and Elisa Otilda Diendofer, a homemaker. His parents were of German and French descent, and he was the youngest of three children. Ralph attended Shelbyville High School, where he was a member of the Indiana National Guard. He graduated in 1929 and received an appointment to the United States Naval Academy at Annapolis, Maryland.

While at the Academy, Rottet participated in football, baseball, and track and was nicknamed "Rolo" by his classmates. Many of his classmates later became general officers, including Henry W. Buse Jr., John P. Condon, Victor H. Krulak, Harold O. Deakin, Frank C. Tharin, Gordon Chung-Hoon, Henry G. Sanchez, Samuel R. Shaw, and John E. Weber. Rottet graduated on May 31, 1934, with a Bachelor of Science degree and was commissioned as a Second Lieutenant in the Marine Corps.

Rottet completed Marine Corps Officer instruction at the Basic School at Philadelphia Navy Yard in May of the following year. He was then assigned to the Marine Detachment aboard the heavy cruiser Salt Lake City, and in early 1936, he participated in patrol cruises along the coast of California and gunnery exercises at San Clemente Island. After Rottet requested flight training, he was ordered to the Naval Air Station Pensacola, Florida in June of that year.

Rottet completed his training in July 1937 and was designated a naval aviator and promoted to first lieutenant. He was then ordered to the Naval Air Station San Diego, California, where he served for three years. During that assignment, in July 1940, he was promoted to captain, and in November of that year, he was transferred back to Pensacola Station. Rottet served as an instructor there for one year before being transferred to Washington, D.C. for duty at the Bureau of Aeronautics of the Navy Department.

== World War II ==
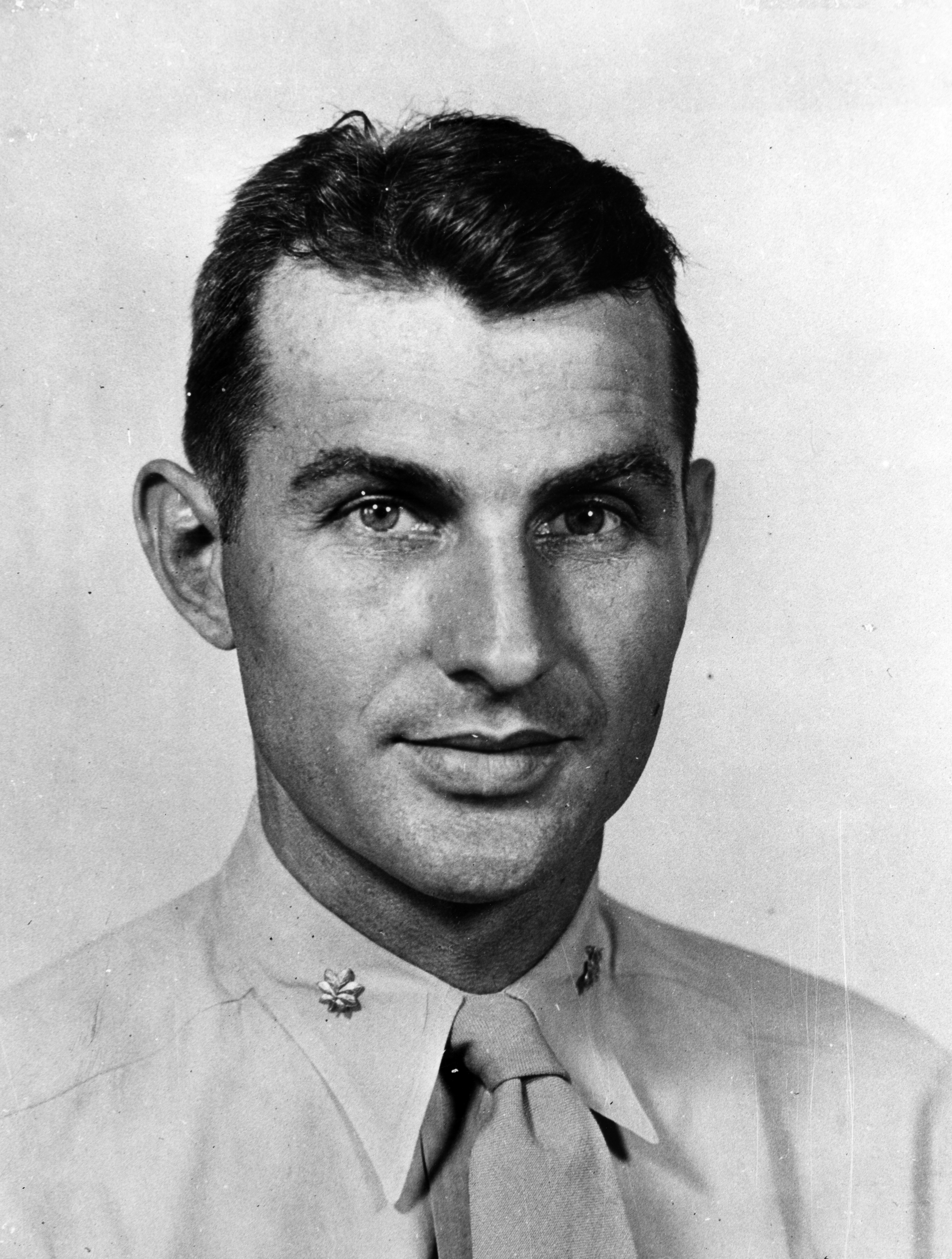
Rottet as Lieutenant colonel during World War II.

Rottet was promoted to Major in May 1942, following the Japanese Attack on Pearl Harbor and the United States' entry into World War II. He was ordered to Marine Corps Air Station Cherry Point, North Carolina, and joined the newly activated 3rd Marine Aircraft Wing under Brigadier general Claude A. Larkin. Rottet was appointed commanding officer of the new Marine Fighting Squadron 311 and was tasked with preparing squadrons for deployment and training replacement pilots for combat squadrons.

Rottet was appointed Commanding officer of the newly established Marine Aircraft Group 31 (MAG-31) at Marine Corps Air Station Cherry Point by the end of January 1943, and later became the Group's executive officer in August of that year, when Colonel Calvin R. Freeman was appointed Commanding officer. The MAG-31 embarked for American Samoa in late September and joined the 4th Marine Aircraft Wing under Brigadier general Harold D. Campbell. Rottet was promoted to lieutenant colonel in June 1943.

The MAG-31 flew missions against Japanese garrisons bypassed in the Marshall Islands, such as Rabaul, and Rottet participated in twenty-one combat missions, flying a Vought F4U Corsair. He took part in strikes on Makin Atoll, Tarawa, and Roi-Namur, earning the Distinguished Flying Cross and three Air Medals.

Rottet again assumed command of MAG-31 in September 1944. Under his command, the group developed an effective napalm bombing method and conducted the first napalm bombing strikes, inflicting extensive damage on the enemy. For his service as Commanding officer of MAG-31, Rottet was decorated with the Bronze Star Medal bearing a Combat "V".

He held that position until December of that year, when he returned to the United States after fifteen months overseas. Following his return, Rottet was assigned to the Army-Navy Staff College in Washington, D.C. for instruction. He graduated in June 1945 and was commissioned to the Marine Corps Air Station Cherry Point, North Carolina, where he assumed command of the Aircraft Engineering Squadron 46.

== Korea and postwar service ==
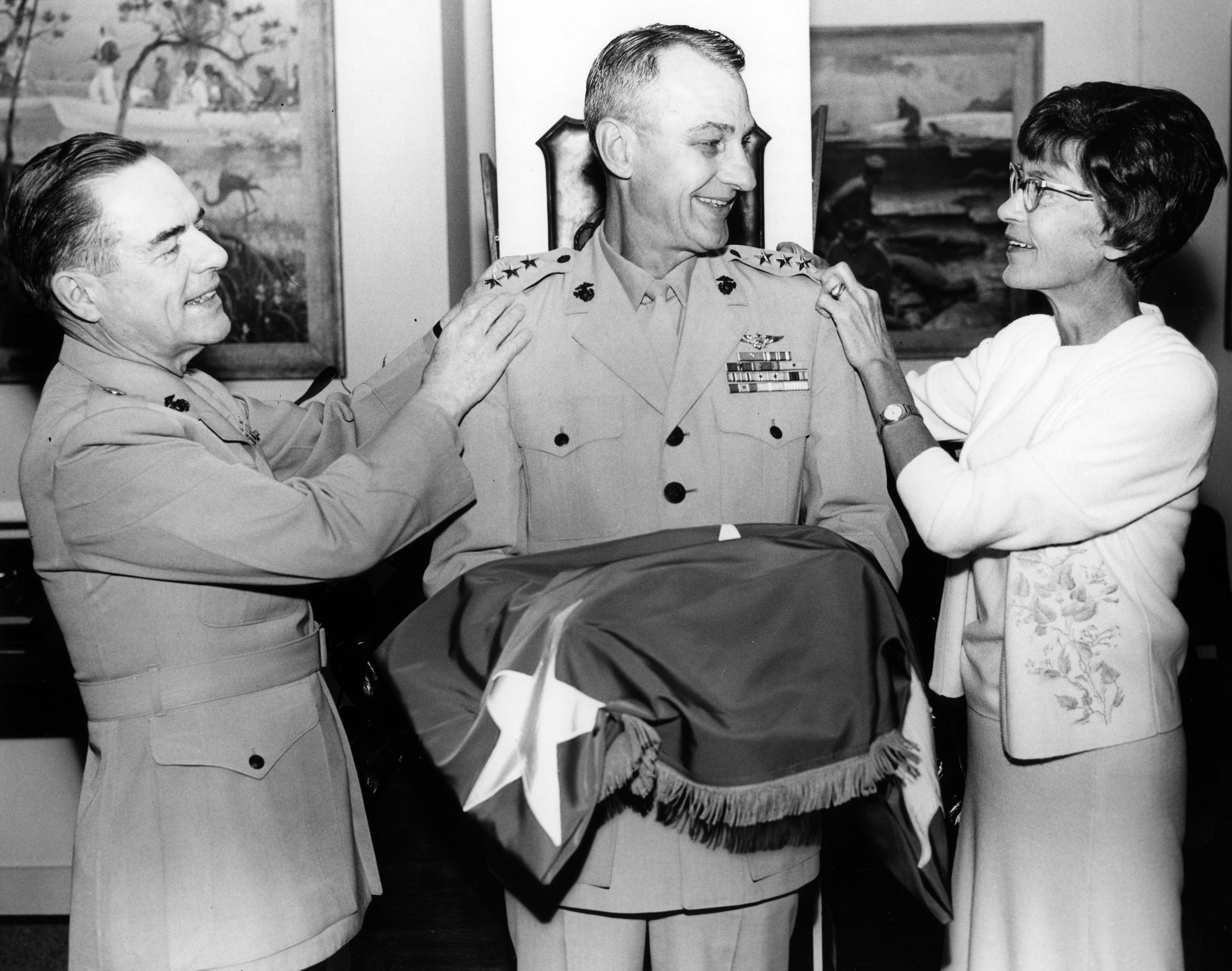
Rottet being promoted Lieutenant general by Commandant Wallace M. Greene and his wife Adele, June 30, 1967.

While at Cherry Point, Rottet was appointed Assistant Chief of Staff for Operations (G-3). In August 1946, he was commissioned to serve as faculty at the Armed Forces Staff College at Norfolk, Virginia, where he remained until July 1948. Rottet was then transferred to the Naval Air Station San Diego, California, and joined the staff of the Air Force Pacific Fleet Command as Marine Aviation Planning Officer. He served under Vice admirals Harold B. Sallada and Thomas L. Sprague and was promoted to colonel in July 1949.

In June 1950, Rottet was ordered to the Naval Air Station Minneapolis, Minnesota, where he served as Commanding officer of the Marine Air Detachment within the Marine Air Reserve Training Command. He was ordered to Headquarters Marine Corps in July 1951 and assumed duty as the Head of the Operations and Training Branch of the Aviation Division, under Brigadier general Clayton C. Jerome.

Rottet was ordered to the Marine Corps Air Station El Toro, California, in July 1953 and completed a two-month Jet training course there. Upon completion of the course, he was sent to Korea and assumed command of the Marine Aircraft Group 12 attached to the 1st Marine Aircraft Wing (1st MAW) under Major general Albert D. Cooley. Rottet was later transferred to the command of Marine Aircraft Group 11, also attached to 1st MAW. Although the units of 1st MAW did not see much combat and only patrolled the Korean Demilitarized Zone, Rottet was decorated with the Legion of Merit for his service.

In July 1954, Rottet returned to the United States and joined the staff of the Marine Corps Base Quantico as a member of the Advanced Research Group at the Marine Corps Educational Center. He was tasked with developing recommendations on how the Marine air-ground task force should evolve structurally to meet the challenges of atomic warfare and new technologies such as helicopters and jet aircraft. He served in that capacity until June 1955, when he reported to Headquarters, Aircraft, Fleet Marine Force, Atlantic at Norfolk Navy Yard, Virginia.

Rottet was appointed Assistant Chief of Staff for Operations (G-3) of that command and served under his former superior from Division of Aviation, Major general Clayton C. Jerome. He was promoted to Chief of Staff of Fleet Marine Force, Atlantic, under lieutenant general Alfred H. Noble in July 1956, becoming the first aviator appointed to that position.

Following his promotion to brigadier general in July 1957, Rottet assumed command of the 4th Provisional Marine Air Ground Task Force, built around units from the 2nd Marine Division and the 2nd Marine Aircraft Wing. He held that command until December of that year, when he was ordered to Japan for duty as the Assistant Commander of 1st Marine Aircraft Wing under Major general Charles H. Hayes.

In March 1959, Rottet returned to the United States and assumed duty as Commander of the Marine Corps Air Bases in the Eastern Area, also serving as the Commanding general of Marine Corps Air Station Cherry Point, North Carolina. While serving in this capacity, he was promoted to major general in July 1960. Three months later, Rottet was appointed Commanding General, 2nd Marine Aircraft Wing and held that assignment until October 1961, when he was transferred to the Marine Corps Base Quantico for duty as the Director of the Marine Corps Educational Center. His main responsibility was the education of Marine Corps officers.

The Marine Corps Educational Center consisted of four resident schools and one correspondence school: the Basic School, focused on basic training for newly commissioned officers; the Junior School for second and first lieutenants; the Senior School for officers ranking Captain and above; the Communication Officers School, which trained selected junior officers in the operational aspects of communications; and the Extension School, which prepared and administered correspondence courses that paralleled resident instruction.

== Vietnam War period ==
In July 1963, Rottet was ordered back to Norfolk, Virginia, and assumed duty as the Deputy Commander of the Fleet Marine Force, Atlantic under lieutenant general James P. Berkeley. While in this capacity, Rottet was responsible for the administration of the 2nd Marine Division, 2nd Marine Aircraft Wing, Camp Lejeune, and other units. He was transferred to Washington, D.C. in April 1966 and assumed duty as Marine Corps liaison officer in the Office of the Chief of Naval Operations under Admiral David L. McDonald. Rottet was decorated with his second Legion of Merit for his service in that assignment.

Rottet was promoted to lieutenant general on July 1, 1967, and assumed duty as the deputy chief of staff for plans and programs at Headquarters Marine Corps. Health problems forced him to resign early, and Rottet retired on September 1, 1968, after 34 years of active duty. For his service as deputy chief of staff for plans and programs, he was decorated with the Navy Distinguished Service Medal.

== Death ==
Rottet was diagnosed with terminal Carcinoma prostate which metastasized to his bones. He settled in New Bern, North Carolina, and following a cardio-pulmonary collapse, Rottet was transported to the Naval Hospital at Camp Lejeune, North Carolina, where he died on November 26, 1971, at the age of 60. His body was cremated, and his ashes were scattered over the Neuse River at his own request. He was survived by his wife, Adele Sparhawk, and five children.

== Decorations ==
Lieutenant General Rottet's personal decorations include:

Naval Aviator Badge
1st Row	Navy Distinguished Service Medal	Legion of Merit with one 5/16" Gold Star	Distinguished Flying Cross
2nd Row	Bronze Star Medal with Combat "V"	Air Medal with two 5/16" Gold Stars	American Defense Service Medal with Fleet Clasp
3rd Row	American Campaign Medal	Asiatic-Pacific Campaign Medal with two 3/16 inch service stars	World War II Victory Medal
4th Row	National Defense Service Medal with one service star	Korean Service Medal	United Nations Korea Medal

== See also ==
- Marine Corps Aviation

Military offices
Preceded by Frank C. Tharin	Commanding general, 2nd Marine Aircraft Wing; September 1960 - October 1961	Succeeded by Richard C. Mangrum
