= Samuel R. Shaw =

U.S. Marine Corps Brigadier General

Samuel Robert Shaw
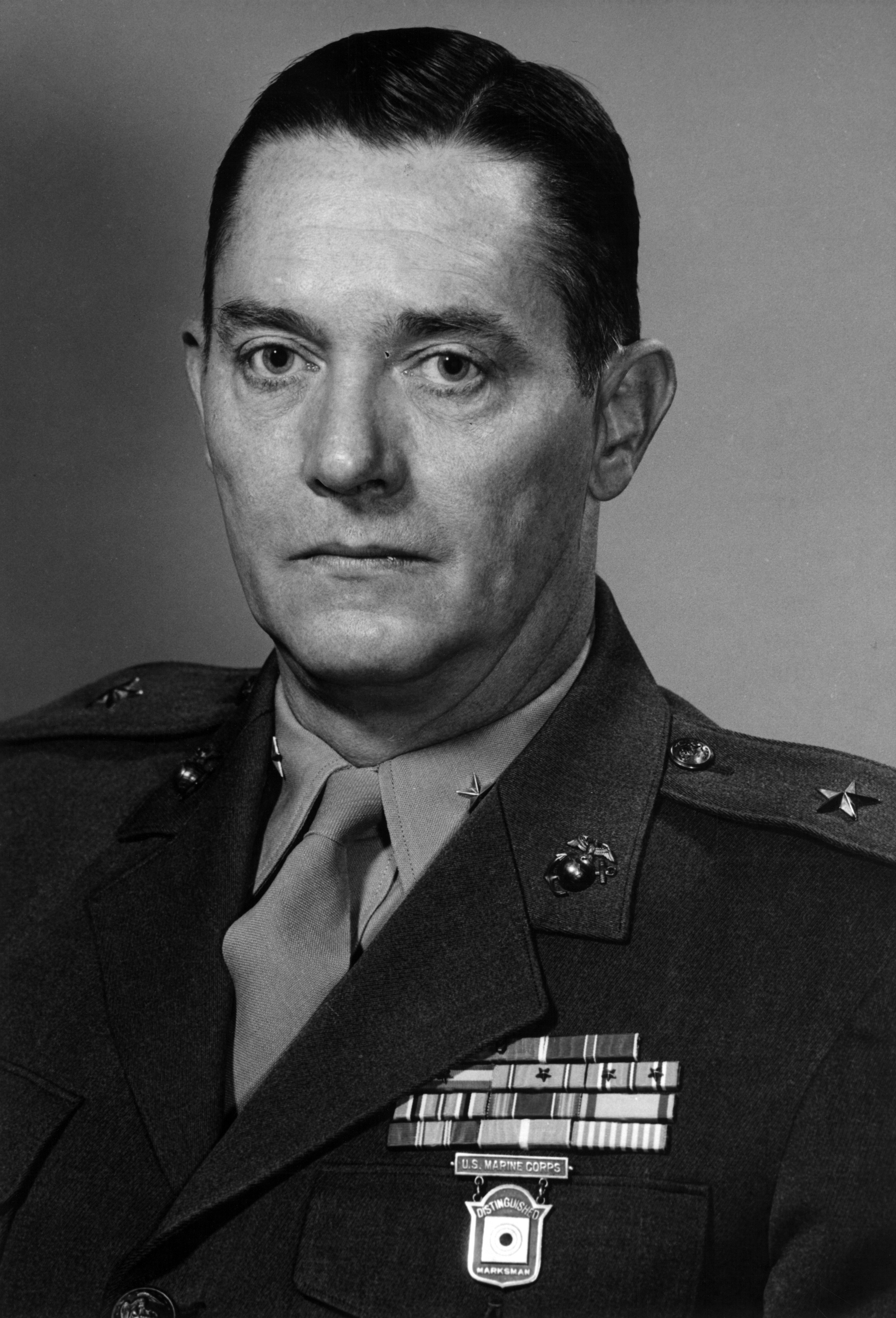
- Shaw as Brigadier general, USMC
- Born: June 6, 1911; Cleveland, Ohio, US
- Died: April 4, 1989 (aged 77); Fort Belvoir, Virginia, US
- Burial place: Quantico National Cemetery
- Military career
- Allegiance: United States
- Branch: United States Marine Corps
- Service years: 1928–1962
- Rank: Brigadier general
- Service number: 0-4994
- Commands: Troop Training Unit, Pacific Fleet; Marine Corps Development Center; 6th Pioneer Battalion
- Conflicts: World War II: Attack on Pearl Harbor; Battle of Okinawa; Chinese Civil War: Operation Beleaguer; Korean War; Cuban Missile Crisis
- Awards: Legion of Merit; Bronze Star Medal

Samuel Robert Shaw (June 6, 1911 – April 4, 1989) was a decorated officer of the United States Marine Corps with the rank of brigadier general. He is most noted for his service as commanding officer, 6th Pioneer Battalion during Battle of Okinawa. Shaw later served as advisor to President John F. Kennedy in the 1962 Cuban Missile Crisis.

Shaw was also a member of so-called "Chowder Society", special Marine Corps Board, which was tasked to conduct research and prepare material relative to postwar legislation concerning the role of the Marine Corps in national defense.

== Early career ==
Samuel R. Shaw was born on June 6, 1911, in Cleveland, Ohio, as the son of William Henry and Ella Kenner Shaw. He attended the high school in Dayton, Ohio, and entered the Marine Corps service in September 1928 and following boot camp, he served two years as enlisted man until he was appointed to the United States Naval Academy at Annapolis, Maryland, in July 1930. During his time at the academy, Shaw was active in football, basketball and track.

Many of his classmates became general officers later: Henry W. Buse Jr., Victor H. Krulak, Ralph K. Rottet, Frank C. Tharin, Robert J. Stroh, Gordon Chung-Hoon, John P. Condon, John F. Flynn, Ronald W. Gladney Jr., James H. Howard, Frank B. Miller, George R. Over, Henry G. Sanchez, George C. Seay, Raymond N. Sharp, Arthur F. Spring, Harold O. Deakin, Robert E. Hommel, John W. Sapp Jr., John E. Weber and Samuel F. Zeiler.

He graduated on May 31, 1934, and was commissioned second lieutenant on the same date. As any other newly commissioned marine officer, he was ordered to the Basic School at Philadelphia Navy Yard for additional officer training, which he completed in June of the following year. Shaw was then attached to the Marine detachment aboard the cruiser USS Tuscaloosa and participated in Fleet Problem XVII, taking place off the west coast of the United States, Central America, and the Panama Canal Zone.

Shaw was transferred to Marine Corps Base Quantico in June 1936 and joined 5th Marine Regiment. He was promoted to the rank of first lieutenant in July 1937 and temporarily detached from the regiment to complete the Army Ordnance Field Service School at Raritan Arsenal, Metuchen, New Jersey. Upon the completion of the school, Shaw rejoined 5th Marines and also served with the Marine Corps Rifle and Pistol Teams, which he later commanded at the Rifle Range, Cape May, New Jersey, from March to August 1939.

He subsequently attended the Junior Course at the Marine Corps Schools, Quantico, which he completed in June 1940. Following his graduation, he was promoted to the rank of captain and commanded Rifle and Pistol Team.

== World War II ==
Shaw sailed for Pearl Harbor in October 1940 and assumed duty as Commander of Company A at Marine Barracks, Pearl Harbor Navy Yard under Colonel Gilder D. Jackson. He was present during the Japanese attack on the Harbor on December 7, 1941, and participated in the anti-aircraft defense. Shaw was promoted to major in May 1942 and to lieutenant colonel in April 1943.

Captain Shaw later described the events of Japanese attack as following:

The boat guards were in place, and the music was out there, and the old and new officer of the day. And we had a music, and a hell of a fine sergeant bugler who had been in Shanghai. He would stand beside the officers of the day, and there came the airplanes, and he looked up and he said, "Captain, those are Japanese war planes." And one of the two of them said, "My God, they are, sound the call to arms." So the bugler started sounding the call to arms before the first bomb hit. Of course they had already started taking out the machine guns. They didn't wait for the key in the Officer of the Day's office, they just broke the door down and hauled out the machine guns, put them in position. Everybody that wasn't involved in that drill grabbed their rifles and ran out in the parade ground, and started firing at the airplanes. They must have had several hundred men out there with rifles. And every [Japanese] plane that was recovered there, or pieces of it, had lots of 30-caliber holes – somebody was hitting them, machine guns or rifles. Then I remembered – here we had all these guys on the post who had not been relieved, and they had been posted at 4 o'clock, and come 9 o'clock, 9:30 they not only had not been relieved but had no chow and no water. So I got hold of the mess sergeant and told him to organize, to go around to the posts. They had a depot. At the beginning it was a supply depot. I told him to send a party over there and draw a lot of canteens and make sandwiches, and we'd send water and sandwiches around to he guys on posts until we found out some way to relieve all these guys, and get people back. Then he told me that it was fine except that he didn't have nearly enough messmen, they were all out in the parade ground shooting. I think the second phase of planes came in at that time and we had a hell of an uproar.

He was transferred to the staff of Fleet Marine Force, San Diego area and served as assistant chief of staff for operations and training under major generals Holland Smith and Clayton B. Vogel successively. Shaw was later ordered to the Army Command and General Staff College at Fort Leavenworth, Kansas, which he completed in October 1944. He departed for the Pacific area the following month and joined Commanding officer, 6th Marine Division under Major General Lemuel C. Shepherd Jr. at Guadalcanal.

Shaw assumed command of 6th Pioneer Battalion and after few months of training, he sailed for Okinawa in March 1945 and after few weeks in staging area at Ulithi, a little atoll in the Caroline Islands, he led his unit ashore on April 1, 1945. The 6th Pioneer battalion was responsible for the securing of the logistical support on time, because arrival of supplies and equipment on landing beaches piled high and could lead to congestion and confusion. Shaw distinguished himself in this capacity and received the Legion of Merit with Combat "V" for his work.

== Later career ==
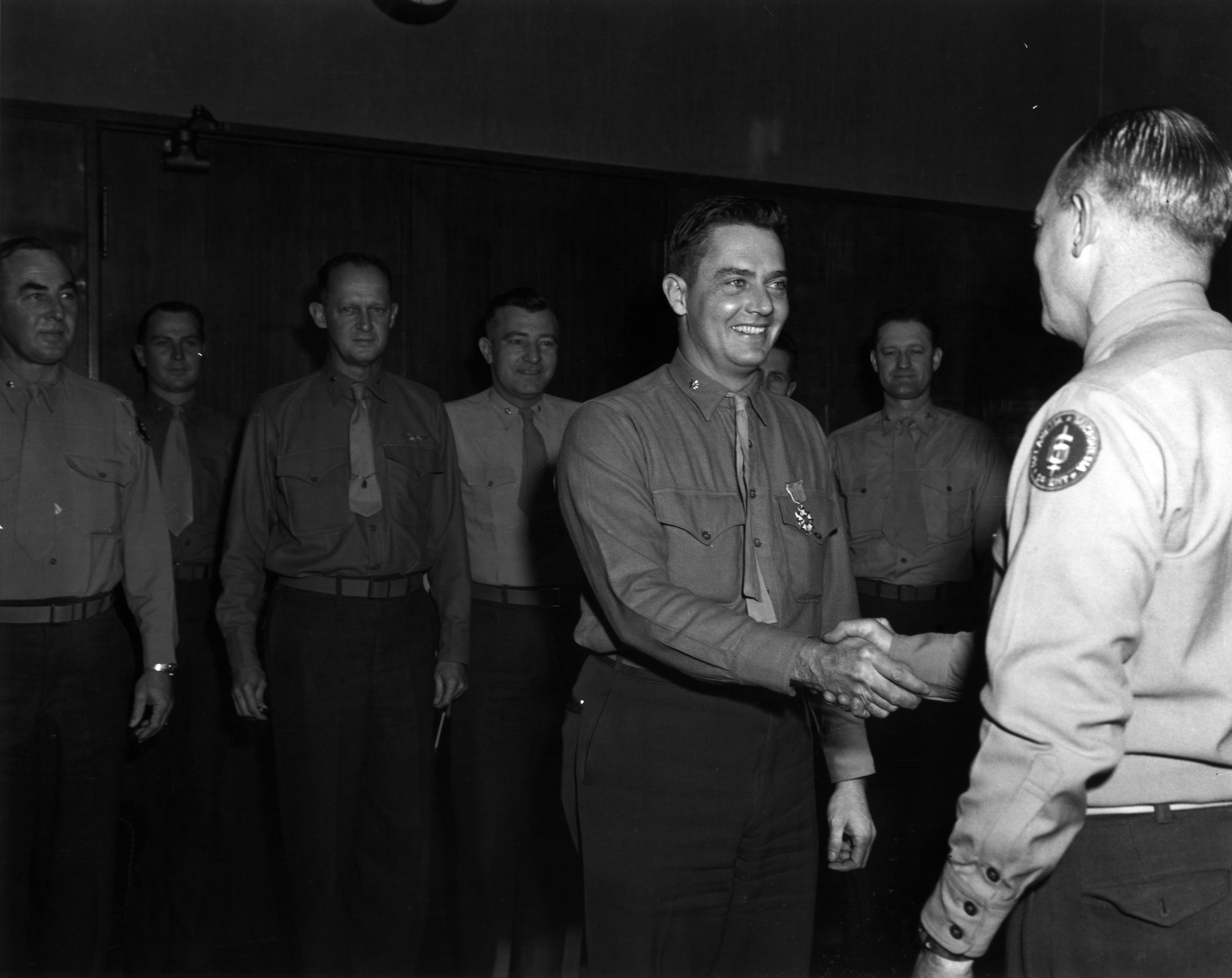
Shaw receives Legion of Merit from General Shepherd for his service with 6th Pioneer Battalion at Okinawa.

Following the Okinawa campaign, 6th Marine Division was stationed on Guam until October 1945, when they received orders for new mission. They were ordered to China in order to assist with the repatriation of more than 600,000 Japanese and Koreans, who remained in China after the end of World War II, and the protection of American lives and property. Shaw landed with the battalion in Qingdao in Shandong and witnessed the surrender of the Japanese 5th Independent Mixed Brigade under Major General Eiji Nagano.

He held the command of 6th Pioneer battalion until the end of December 1945, when he was transferred to the staff of 6th Marine Division and succeeded lieutenant colonel Wayne H. Adams as assistant chief of staff for logistics. Following the disbandment of 6th Marine Division at the end of March 1946, Shaw served with 3rd Marine Brigade until September of that year. He was decorated with the Bronze Star Medal for his service with 6th Marine Division and also received Order of the Cloud and Banner with Special Cravat (4th Class) by the Government of Republic of China.

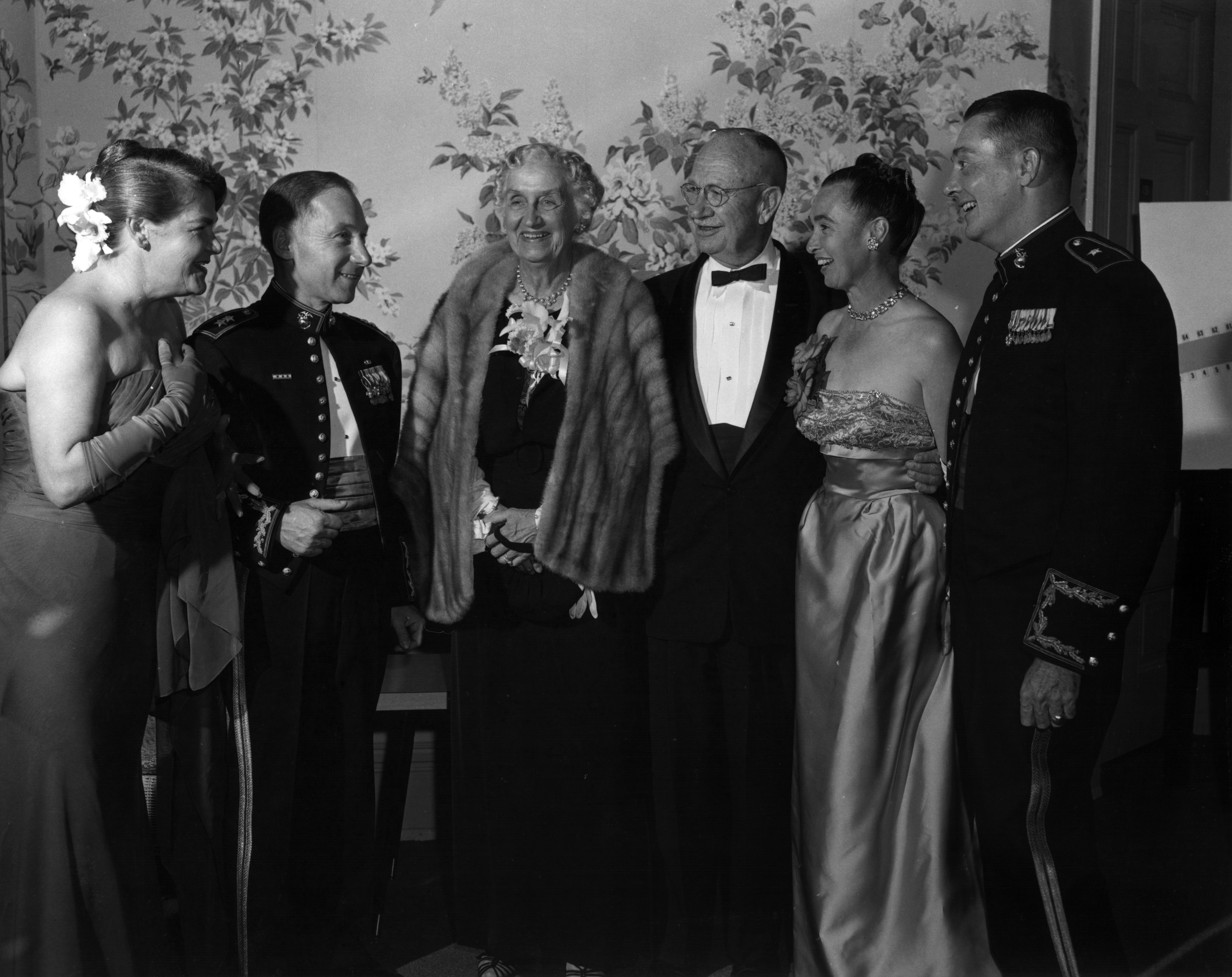
Officers Ball in San Diego, 1960. Shaw with his wife Joy (right), Holland Smith with wife Ada (center) and Victor H. Krulak with wife Amy (left).

Shaw subsequently returned to the United States and became a member of the so-called "Chowder Society", special Marine Corps Board under general Gerald C. Thomas, which was tasked by Commandant Alexander Vandegrift to conduct research and prepare material relative to postwar legislation concerning the role of the Marine Corps in national defense. Due to cuts in Marine Corps budget, the threat of merging of the Marine Corps into the United States Army, was more realistic. Also thanks to his work, he is one of the few men, who helped the future of the Corps.

While in this assignment, Shaw had the opportunity to cooperate with great names of modern Marine history such as: Merrill B. Twining, Victor H. Krulak, Merritt A. Edson, Robert E. Hogaboom, James E. Kerr, James C. Murray, Jonas M. Platt, DeWolf Schatzel, James D. Hittle, Robert D. Heinl, Edward H. Hurst or Marine Corps Reserve officers John R. Blandford, Arthur B. Hanson, Lyford Hutchins, and William McCahill.

Shaw was transferred to Washington, D.C., in January 1949 for duty as research officer in the Organizational Research and Policy Division, Office of the Vice Chief of Naval Operations under Admiral Arthur W. Radford.

He was promoted to the rank of colonel in August 1949 and assumed duty as Shore Party Officer in the Engineer Section, Division of Plans and Policies, at Headquarters Marine Corps due to his experiences in World War II. Shaw later served as Chief of the Joint Action Panel in the Marine Corps, Division of Plans and Policies under Brigadier General Edwin A. Pollock and left Washington in February 1952.

Shaw subsequently joined the Joint Amphibious Board at Little Creek Naval Base, Virginia and remained with that assignment until July of the following year. He was then transferred to Marine Corps Base Quantico and joined the Advanced Research Group, Marine Corps Educational Center, tasked with the development of recommendations on how the Marine air-ground task force should evolve structurally to meet the challenges of atomic warfare and new technologies such as helicopters and jet aircraft. Other members of the group were Thomas J. Coolley, John P. Condon, August Larson Joseph N. Renner, Carson A. Roberts, George R. E. Shell, Eustace R. Smoak, William J. Van Ryzin, and Richard G. Weede.

He sailed for Korea in June 1954 and joined 1st Marine Division under Major General Robert E. Hogaboom as assistant chief of staff for logistics. However Armistice was already in effect and he saw no combat. Shaw participated in the guarding of Korean Demilitarized Zone until July 1955 and then returned to Headquarters Marine Corps, Washington for duty as director, Policy Analysis Branch.

In June 1957, he was named deputy chief of staff, research and development, and promoted to the rank of brigadier general in November of that year. Shaw was transferred to Quantico in July 1958 and was appointed director of the Marine Corps Development Center there. In this capacity, he was responsible for the developing of Marine Corps warfighting abilities to enable the Corps to field combat-ready forces. Its responsibilities include doctrine, organization, training and education, requirements development, and leadership.

Shaw assumed duty as commanding general, Troop Training Unit, Pacific Fleet and was responsible for amphibious training of several marine and navy units within Pacific Fleet. He retired from the Marine Corps service on March 1, 1962, after 34 years of active service.

== Retirement and civil career ==
Shaw remained in retirement only until September 1962 when he was recalled to active duty as director of programs on the staff of the Preparedness Sub-Committee, Senate Armed Services Committee in Washington, D. C. He also served as advisor to President John F. Kennedy during the Cuban Missile Crisis in October of that year. Shaw continued to serve with Senate Armed Service Committee and travelled to Vietnam 13 times during the War.

He was named the chief legislative liaison official for the Selective Service System in 1972 and continued in this capacity until his second retirement in 1977. Shaw was decorated with Distinguished Civilian Service Medal by President Jimmy Carter for his service with Selective Service System and Senate Armed Services Committee.

Shaw settled in Alexandria, Virginia, and served as president of the Marine Corps Historical Committee and had been editor of the Marine Corps Gazette magazine. He was a member of the Military Order of the Carabao and the Army & Navy Club.

Brigadier General Samuel R. Shaw died of heart attack on April 4, 1989, in DeWitt Army Hospital at Fort Belvoir, Virginia. General Shaw is buried at Quantico National Cemetery.

== Decorations ==
Here is the ribbon bar of Brigadier General Samuel R. Shaw:

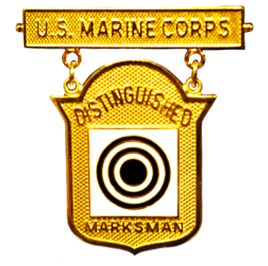

1st Row	Legion of Merit with Combat "V"			
2nd Row	Bronze Star Medal	Navy Presidential Unit Citation with one star	Distinguished Civilian Service Medal	American Defense Service Medal with Base Clasp
3rd Row	Asiatic-Pacific Campaign Medal with two 3/16 inch service stars	American Campaign Medal	World War II Victory Medal	China Service Medal
4th Row	National Defense Service Medal with one star	Korean Service Medal	United Nations Korea Medal	Order of the Cloud and Banner with Special Cravat (4th Class) (Republic of China)

== See also ==
- 6th Marine Division

Military offices
Preceded by Harvey C. Tschirgi	Commanding General, Troop Training Unit, Pacific Fleet; November 1959 - March 1, 1962	Succeeded by John G. Bouker
