= VMFA-311 =

United States Marine Corps fighter attack squadron

Marine Fighter Attack Squadron 311
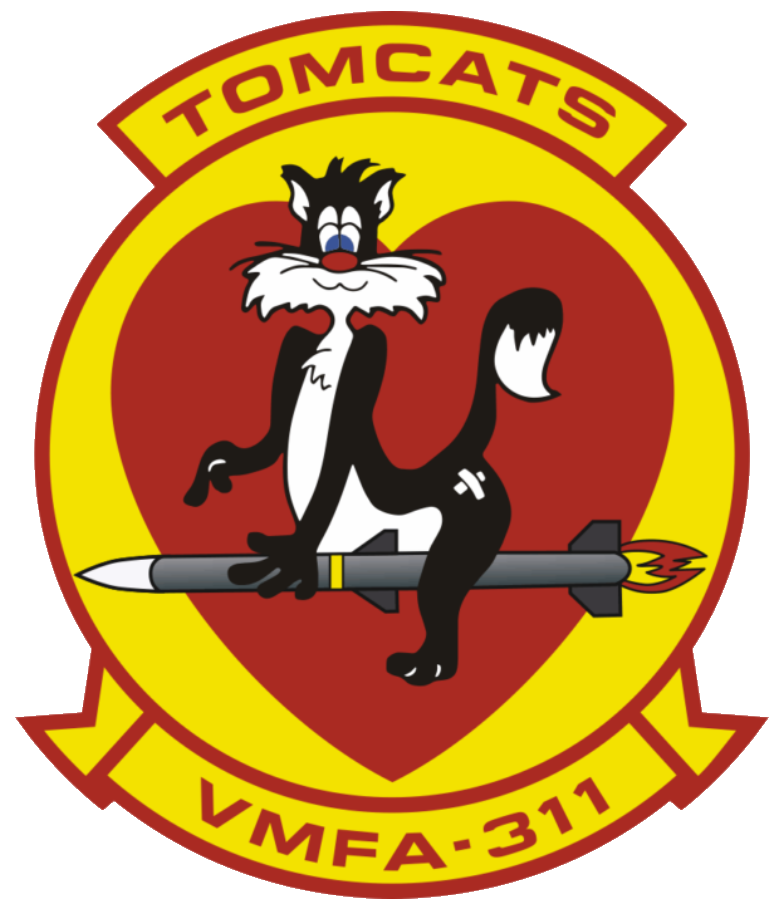
- VMFA-311 insignia
- Active: 1 December 1942 – 15 October 2020; April 14, 2023 – present
- Country: United States of America
- Branch: United States Marine Corps
- Type: Fighter/attack squadron
- Role: Close air support Air interdiction Aerial reconnaissance
- Nicknames: Tomcats; Hells Belles (WWII)
- Tail Code: WL
- Engagements: World War II; Battle of Okinawa; Korean War; Attack on the Sui-ho Dam; Vietnam War; Operation Starlite; Operation Desert Storm; Global war on terrorism; Operation Enduring Freedom; Operation Iraqi Freedom; 2003 invasion of Iraq Operation Epic Fury

Commanders
- Notable commanders: Ralph K. Rottet; Michael R. Yunck; John P. Condon; Paul J. Fontana; John H. Miller; Robert Sofge

Aircraft flown
- Fighter: SNJ Texan; F4U Corsair; TO-1 Shooting Star; F9F Panther; F9F Cougar; A4D-2 Skyhawk; AV-8B Harrier II; F-35C Lightning II

Marine Fighter Attack Squadron 311 (VMFA-311) is a United States Marine Corps fighter attack squadron consisting of F-35C Lightning II. Known as the "Tomcats", the squadron is based at Marine Corps Air Station Miramar, California and falls under the command of Marine Aircraft Group 11 (MAG-11) and the 3rd Marine Aircraft Wing (3rd MAW).

== History ==
=== World War II ===
==== Commissioning & early training ====
Marine Fighting Squadron 311 (VMF-311) was commissioned on 1 December 1942 at Marine Corps Air Station Cherry Point, North Carolina. The squadron was assigned to Marine Aircraft Group 31 of the 3rd Marine Aircraft Wing and was commanded by Major Ralph K. Rottet . The squadron moved to Marine Corps Air Station Parris Island, South Carolina on 18 April 1943. While at Parris Island, the squadron transitioned from flying SNJ Texan trainers to flying the newly fielded Vought F4U Corsair. By the end of June, VMF-311 had 15 Corsairs on the flightline and had totally divested all of its SNJs. On 31 August 1943, the squadron departed the east coast arriving at Marine Corps Air Depot Miramar, California on 8 September 1943. On 23 September 1943, VMF-311 along with the other MAG-31 squadrons embarked aboard the USS Nassau (CVE-16) headed for the Pacific Theater.

==== American Samoa & the Marshall Islands ====
VMF-311 participated in what was one of the earliest American catapult operations involving the Corsair when 21 F4Us launched from USS Nassau on 6 October 1943 inbound to United States Naval Station Tutuila. The squadron, along with the rest of MAG-31, was now part of the 4th Marine Base Defense Aircraft Wing. On 8 October, VMF-311 aircraft flew to a newly constructed airfield on Wallis Island where they remained until January 1944. During its time in American Samoa, the squadron was responsible for flying combat air patrols and other missions as required but did not engage any enemy aircraft.

On 26 January 1944 VMF-311 personnel embarked on the USS Typhoon (LST-1118) and USS Constantine arriving at Roi-Namur on 6 February 1944. Early in the morning on 12 February 1944, Japanese bombers hit Roi-Namur and destroying most of the squadron's equipment and all of its tents and personal gear. 14 officers and 99 enlisted Marines were casualties during this raid. On 24 February, the squadron was moved again, this time to Kwajalein Atoll. Beginning on 23 March 1944, the squadron began flying strafing missions against Wotje, Maloelap, Mille, Jaluit, and Taroa. The strikes continued while the squadron moved back to Roi-Namur by 4 April. On 14 May, VMF-311 conducted its first bombing mission utilizing the F4U Corsair. During the squadron's time on Roi-Namur, Charles Lindbergh, at the time a consultant with United Aircraft, flew combat missions with the squadron. VMF-311 continued in its roll of engaging bypassed Japanese Garrisons until March 1945.

==== Okinawa and the end of the war ====
On 8 March 1945, the squadron embarked on the USS Sitkoh Bay (CVE-86) and the USS Breton (CVE-23) with its newly arrived F4U-1Cs with 4 x 20mm cannons and four pairs of pylons for rockets. On 7 April, squadron aircraft landed at Yontan Airfield joining the Tactical Air Force, Tenth Army during the Battle of Okinawa. That same day the squadron scored its first enemy aircraft when multiple squadron aircraft flying combat air patrol engaged and destroyed a kamikaze Kawasaki Ki-48 headed for the Sitkoh Bay. During the month of April the squadron was credited with shooting down 22 enemy aircraft and in May another 37.

On 1 July the squadron departed Yontan to begin operations from Chimu Airfield, also on Okinawa. The next day, four squadron aircraft took part in the unit's first fighter sweeps against Kyushu. Two more were conducted during the rest of July. At the close of combat operations on Okinawa, VMF-311 was credited with shooting down 71 Japanese aircraft in a four-month period. This was the second highest total of Japanese aircraft in the Tactical Air Force. During its five months on Okinawa, the squadron lost 16 aircraft with 3 pilots killed. On 9 September 1945, the squadron departed Chimu Airfield for Yokosuka Naval Airfield.

=== 1946–1950 ===
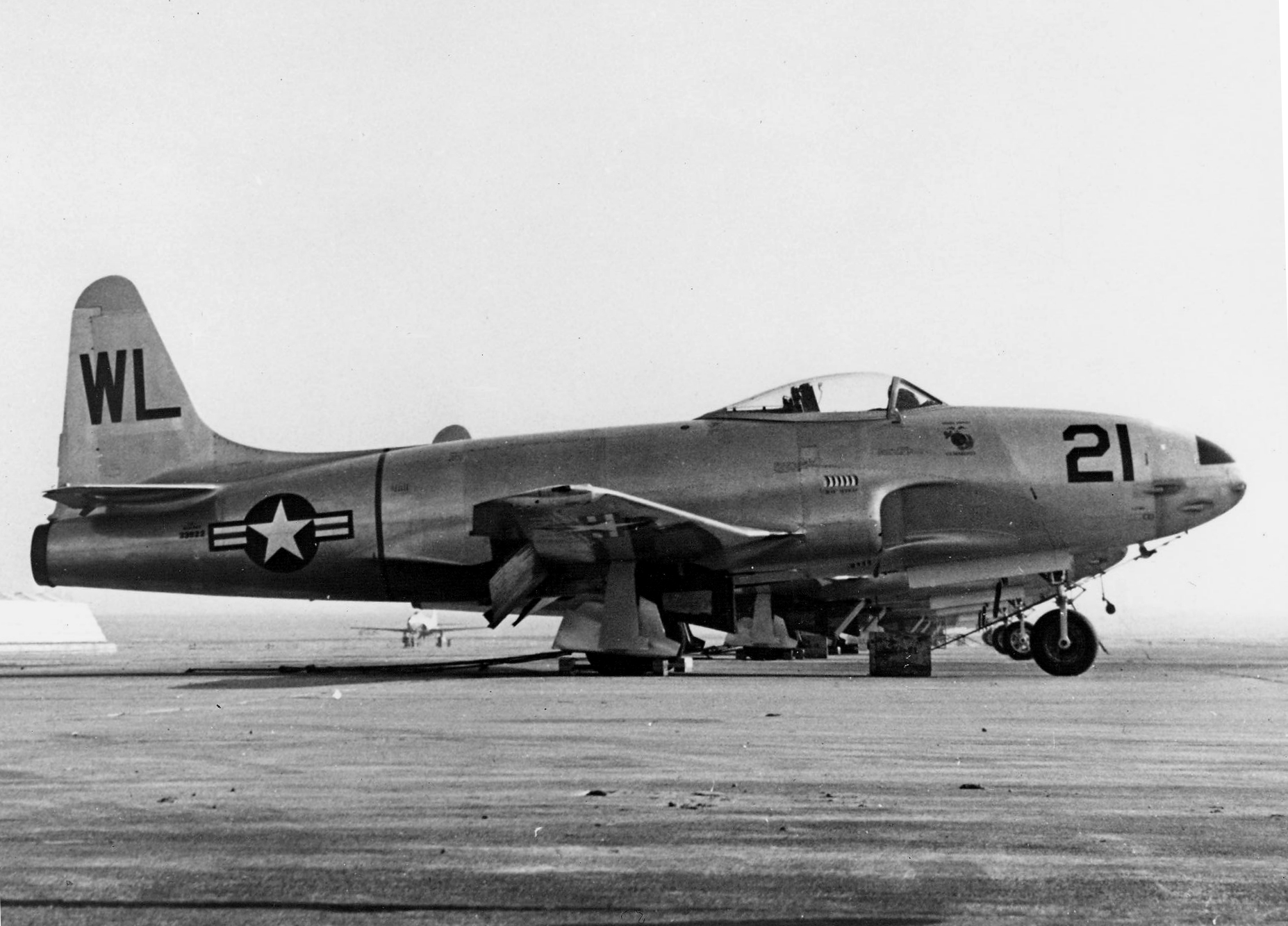
TO-1 Shooting Star from VMF-311 in 1948

On 17 September 1945, the squadron landed at the Yokosuka Naval District to begin occupation duty in mainland Japan. Occupational duty in Japan lasted till May 1946, when MAG-31 was notified to prepare for the termination of its Japanese assignment; VMF-311 was going home. Between July 1946 and April 1947 the squadron had a sleeping existence and being transferred to MAG-32 and later MAG-12 while consisting of one officer, but in 1949 VMF-311 became the first West Coast Marine jet squadron when it started flying the TO-1 Shooting Star. Coincidentally the squadron was re-designated Marine Fighter Squadron 311 (VMF-311) and around that time acquired the code letters WL, phonetically pronounced as "William Love," but from which also came the nickname "Willy Lovers". The squadron quickly transitioned to the F9F Panther in October 1949 and found itself once again preparing for war by November 1950, arriving once again at Yokusuka airfield in Japan.

=== The Korean War, 1950–1955 ===
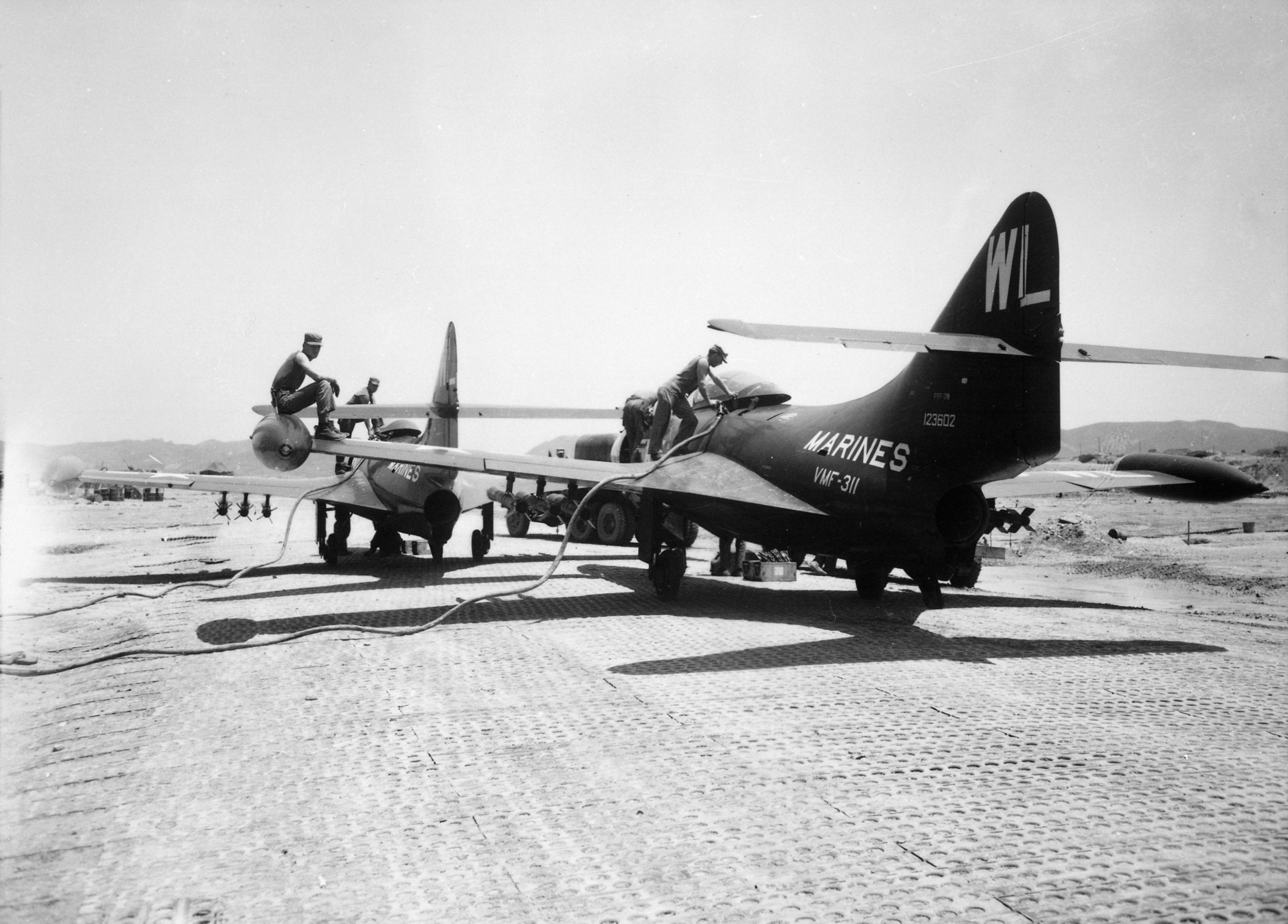
Two VMF-311 F9F-2Bs at Pohang during the Korean War

Arriving in South Korea on 7 December 1950, VMF-311 was the first land-based Marine jet squadron to be used in combat providing close air support for the Marines and Soldiers on the ground. In late-June 1952 the squadron participate in the attack on the Sui-ho Dam. Additionally, the squadron pioneered strip-alert tactics still practiced today. Legendary pilots during this era included later astronaut and Senator John Glenn and baseball star Ted Williams. CApt William L. Armogast was the last Marine Corps jet pilot to drop bombs in North Korea when he destroyed a communist supply point with 4 x 500-lb bombs less than one hour before the ceasefire was set to begin. In over 2 1/2 years of action in Korea the squadron amassed 18,851 combat sorties. In 1957, the squadron finally was re-designated Marine Attack Squadron 311 (VMA-311). The nickname "Tomcats" was also bestowed during this era.

=== Vietnam War ===
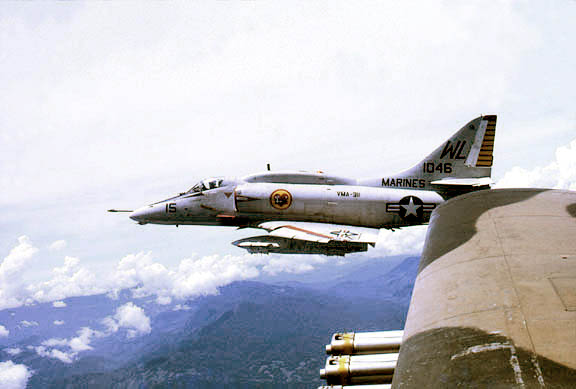
VMA-311 A-4E over South Vietnam in 1970

The first A4D-2 Skyhawk was received in the summer of 1958, initiating 30 years of Skyhawk service. In May 1965 the squadron, now flying A-4Es, deployed to Chu Lai Air Base, South Vietnam and on 2 June, they conducted their first combat mission of the Vietnam War. In August 1965, VMA-311 supported the 7th Marine Regiment in Operation Starlite, the first major American operation of the war. The squadron recorded a four-day sortie total of 240 from 5 to 8 May 1968 in support of their fellow marines during the Battle of Khe Sanh.

The squadron moved to Danang Air Base in late July 1970. In early 1971 the squadron provided support for Operation Lam Son 719 the South Vietnamese offensive into Laos and was credited with destroying eight People's Army of Vietnam tanks.During May 1971 the squadron readied for redeployment, flying their last mission on 7 May before leaving South Vietnam on 12 May.

The squadron rejoined Marine Aircraft Group 12 (MAG-12) at MCAS Iwakuni with the entire squadron redeployed by 27 May 1971. On 29 October the squadron deployed to Naha Air Base until 15 January 1972.

On 16 May 1972 VMA-311 once again deployed to South Vietnam with MAG-12 Forward and VMA-211 to Bien Hoa Air Base in response to the North Vietnamese Easter Offensive. The squadron would support Army of the Republic of Vietnam forces fighting in the Battle of An Loc. Their final sortie in-country would occur on 29 January 1973, a day before they would drop the last ordnance from a Marine A-4 Skyhawk during the war. VMA-311 would fly 54,625 combat sorties during their time supporting operations in Vietnam, Laos and Cambodia.

=== The Gulf War ===
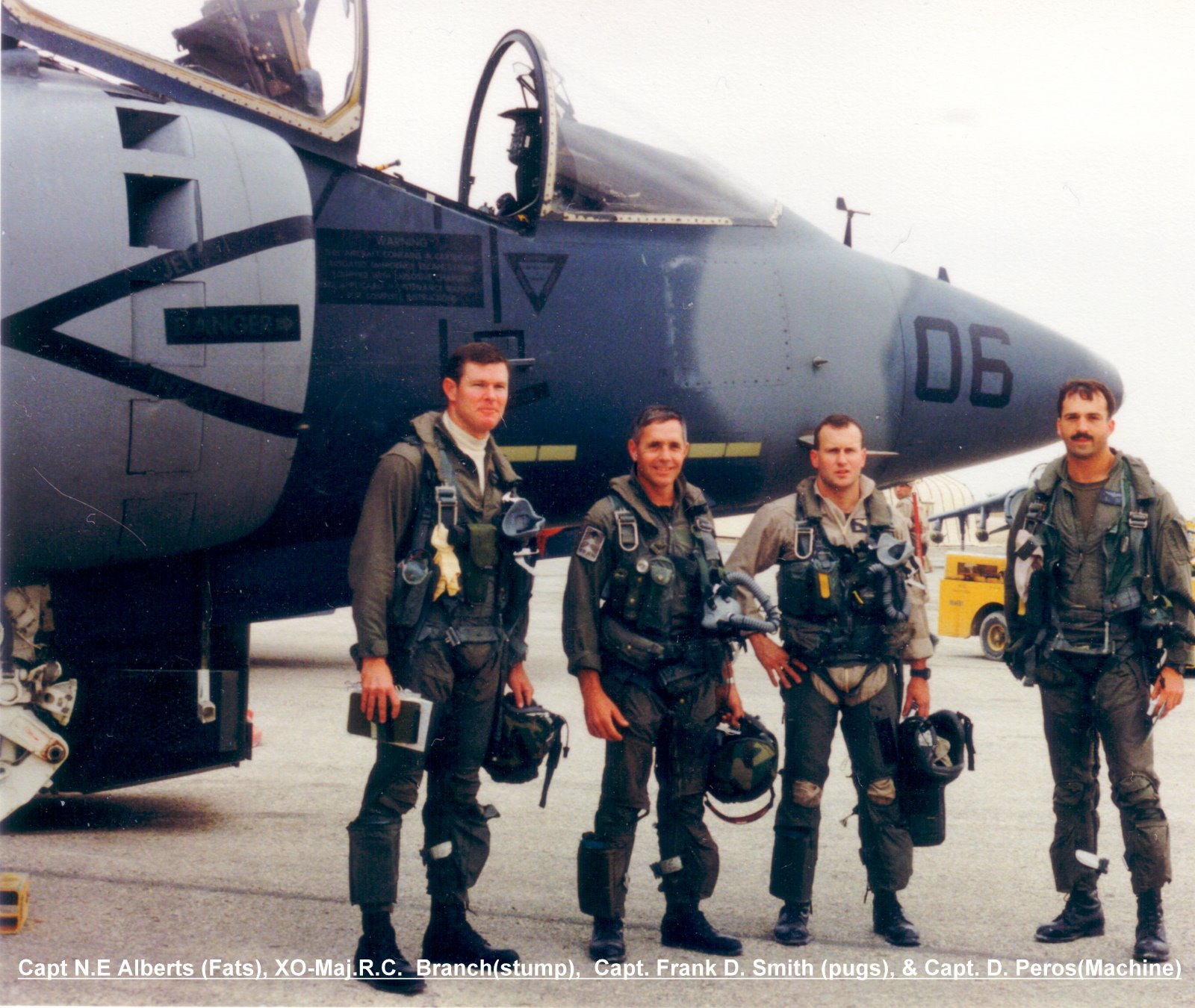
Some 311 Harrier pilots in 1991

In 1988 VMA-311 received its first AV-8B Harrier and shortly thereafter headed into harm's way again. On 11 August 1990, after the Iraqi invasion of Kuwait, VMA-311 deployed in support of Operation Desert Shield, leading all other Marine fixed-wing squadrons into Saudi Arabia where they were based out of King Abdulaziz Naval Base. While there, the Tomcats were the most forward deployed fixed-wing squadron. On 17 January 1991 while in support of Operation Desert Storm the squadron became the first to utilize the AV-8B in combat when a flight of four Harriers destroyed an Iraqi artillery position in support of the Battle of Khafji. During 43 days of air combat operations, Tomcat pilots flew 1,017 combat missions and delivered 840 tons of ordnance against enemy targets throughout Kuwait and Southern Iraq.

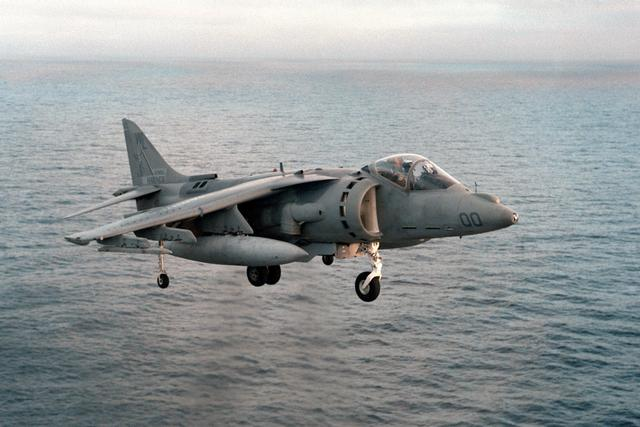
A VMA-311 Harrier landing on USS Tarawa in 2001

=== Global war on terrorism ===
On 3 November 2001, VMA-311 Harriers attached to the 15th Marine Expeditionary Unit embarked aboard USS Peleliu became the first Harriers to fly combat missions in Afghanistan during Operation Enduring Freedom.

On 15 January 2003, VMA-311 deployed to the Northern Persian Gulf as part of Amphibious Task Force West. On 21 March 2003, almost 59 years to the day after VMF-311's first combat sortie in World War II, they flew their first combat sortie of Operation Iraqi Freedom. During the war they flew over 550 sorties while dropping 77 tons of precision ordnance, destroying or neutralizing 132 Iraqi targets while operating from two amphibious assault carriers, USS Bonhomme Richard and USS Tarawa. The squadron returned from the Persian Gulf on 24 July 2003. In October 2004, the squadron deployed to Al Asad Air Base in Iraq in support of Operation Iraqi Freedom, while simultaneously deploying a 6 jet 90 Marine detachment to MAG-12 in Iwakuni, Japan to support the 31st Marine Expeditionary Unit. In September of 2006, a contingent of 6 jets was sent to support the 15th MUE aboard the USS Boxer (LHD 4), which was subsequently sent into Al Asad, Iraq to support their sister squadron VMA-211. The detachment left Iraq to return to the USS Boxer in April of 2007 to return to their home base of Yuma, AZ. In early 2008, the squadron made its final deployment to Al Asad Air Base in support of Operation Iraqi Freedom, while simultaneously deploying a 6 jet detachment aboard the USS Peleliu (LHA 5) in support of the 15th Marine Expeditionary Unit. The squadron's 2008 deployment to Iraq marked the Marine Corps Harrier's final participation in Operation Iraqi Freedom, and on 5 October 2008, VMA-311's aircraft were the last Harriers to fly combat missions in support of Operation Iraqi Freedom. For the year 2008, VMA-311 had the distinction of being selected as the Marine Corps "Attack Squadron of the Year" by the Marine Corps Aviation Association (MCAA). Operation Iraqi Freedom deployments were soon followed in 2010 with deployments again to the 15th MEU and a Unit Deployment Program to the Pacific region. While there, they spent over two months aboard USS Essex with the 31st MEU while participating in the multilateral exercises Cobra Gold 2010 and Balikatan 2010. VMA-311 deployed to Camp Bastion, Helmand Province, Afghanistan in support of Operation Enduring Freedom from April to September 2013.

=== Decommissioning (2020) ===
VMA-311 was decommissioned at MCAS Yuma on 15 October 2020.

=== Reactivation (2023) ===
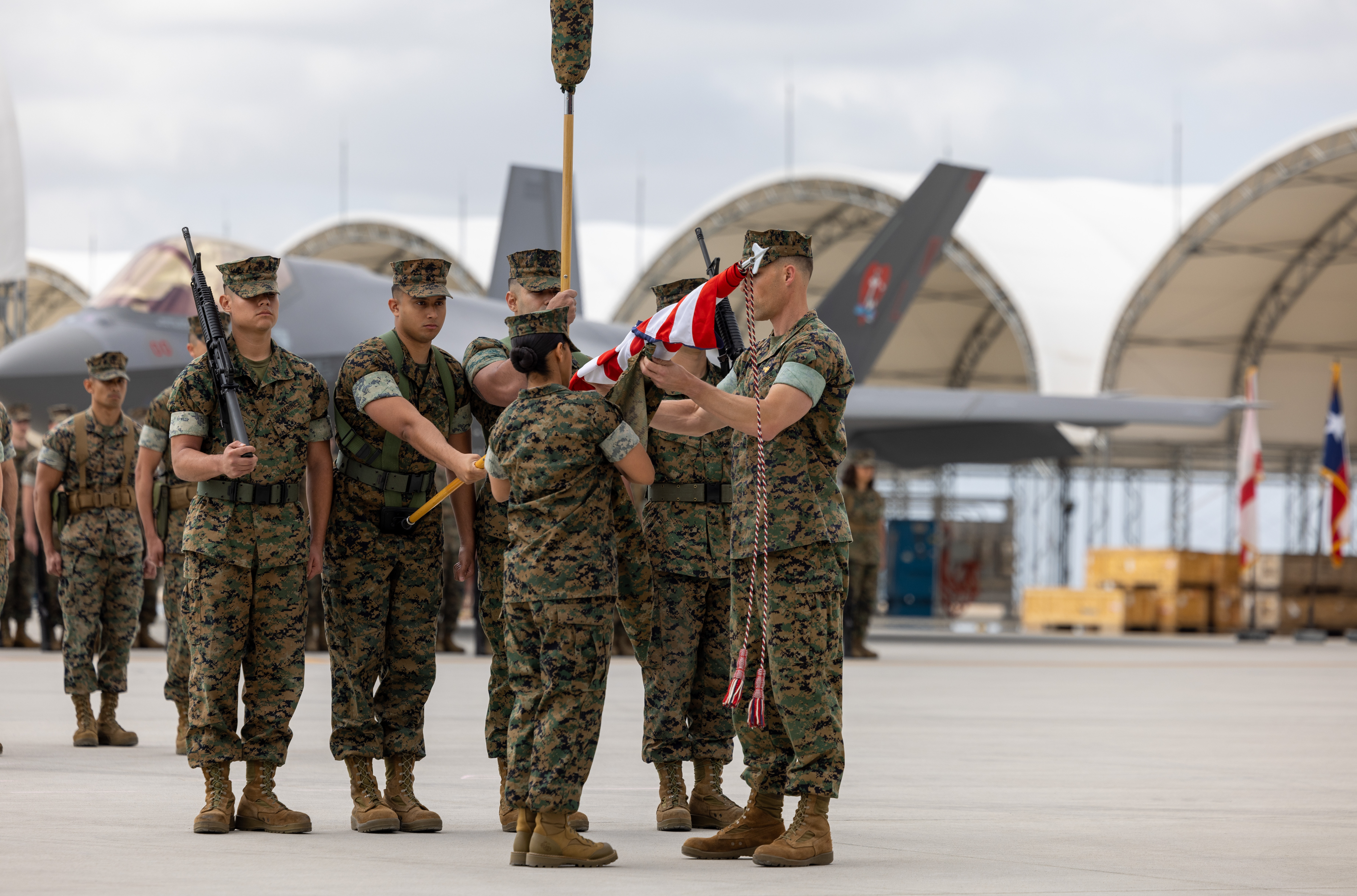
VMFA-311 reactivation ceremony, 14 April 2023

The squadron was reactivated on 14 April 2023 and will work in tandem with VMFA-314 to transition to F-35Cs. The transition is due to be concluded by 2024.

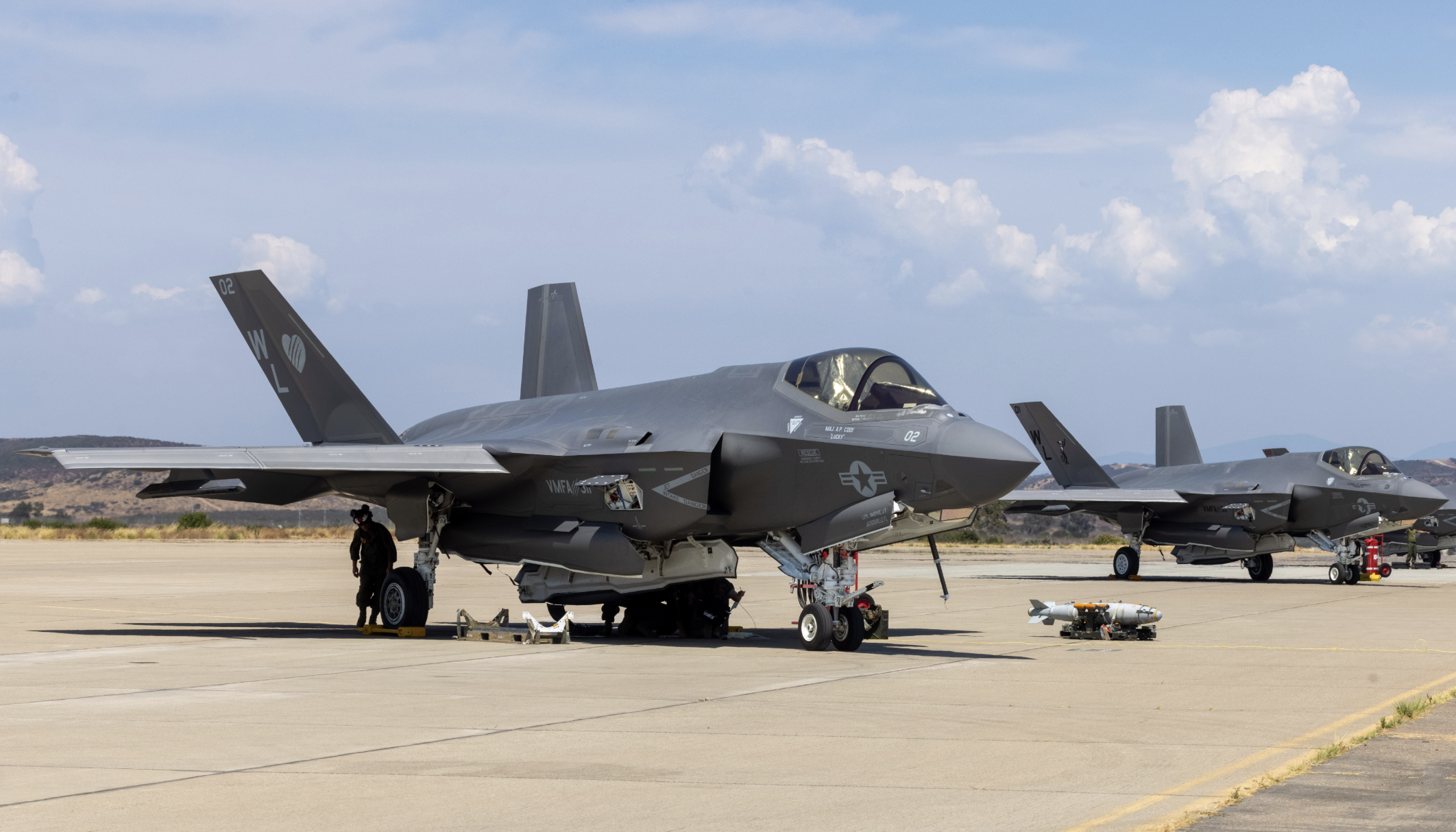
VMFA-311 F-35C's

The Tomcats declared Initial Operational Capability (IOC) in July of 2024 with their 6 aircraft.

In March 2026, 10 F-35C's from VMFA-311 arrived at RAF Lakenheath in the United Kingdom. This marks the first time the F-35C has landed in England.

Following the historic arrival of VMFA-311 and their F-35Cs at Lakenheath, the squadron departed the U.K. for the Middle East and combat sorties within Operation Epic Fury against Iran.

== Squadron aces ==
The following Marines from VMA-311 have been credited as Flying aces:

- 2nd Lt. William P. Brown Jr. - 7.0
- Maj. Michael R. Yunck - 7.0 (5.0 with VMA-311)
- Maj. Perry L. Shuman - 6.0

== Notable former members ==
- Eugene R. Brady - recipient of the Navy Cross for action during the Vietnam War flew with VMF-311 during the Korean War.
- Ted Williams - Hall of Fame baseball player flew with the squadron during the Korean War.
- John H Glenn Jr. - engineer, astronaut, businessman, and politician. He was the third American in space, and the first American to orbit the Earth, circling it three times in 1962, also flew with the squadron during the Korean War.

== Gallery ==
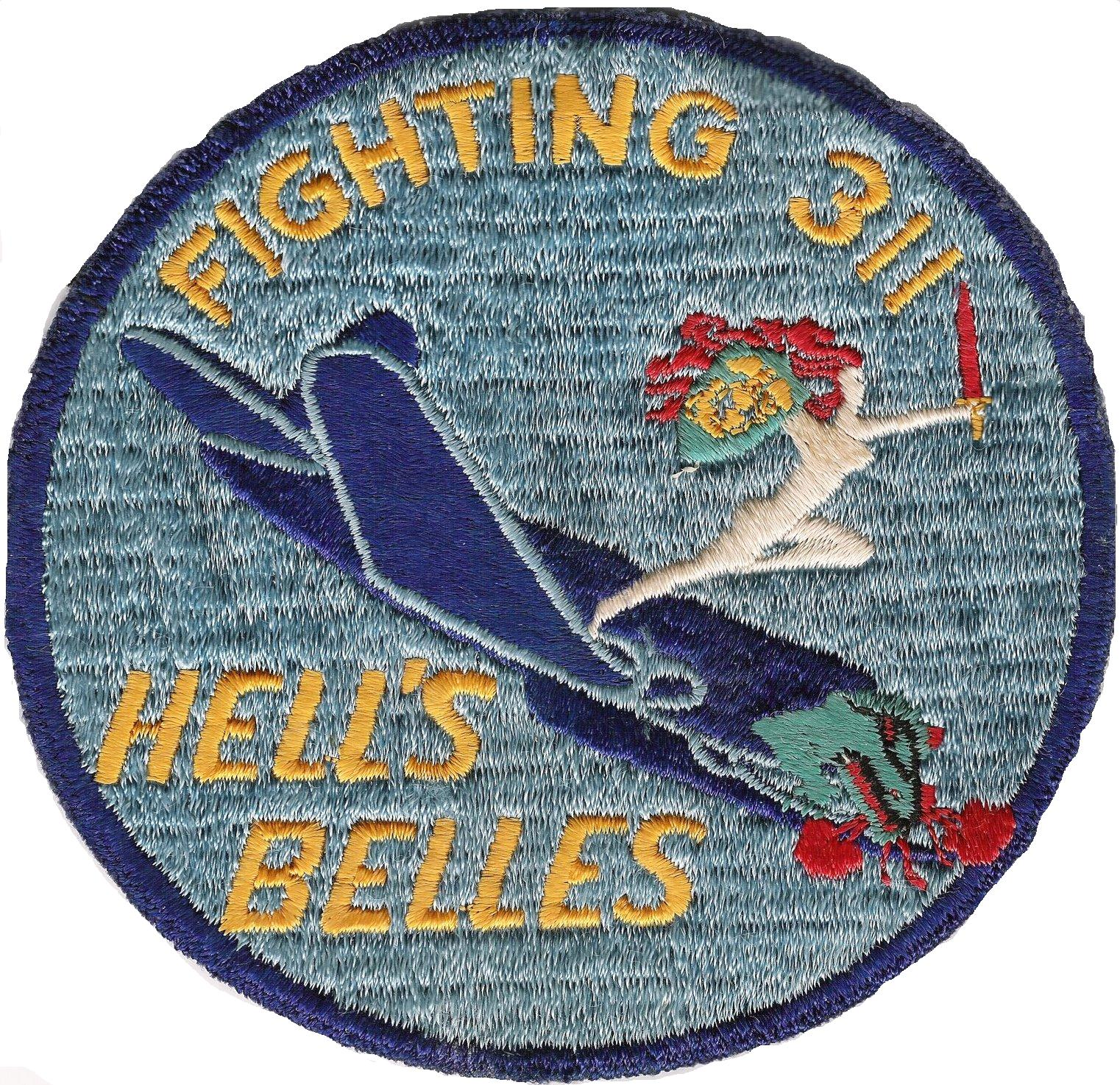
VMF-311 insignia during World War II

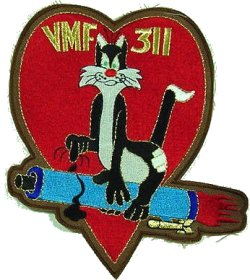
VMF-311 insignia during the Korean War

== See also ==
- United States Marine Corps Aviation
- List of United States Marine Corps aircraft squadrons
- List of decommissioned United States Marine Corps aircraft squadrons
