= USS Sigsbee =

Fletcher-class destroyer

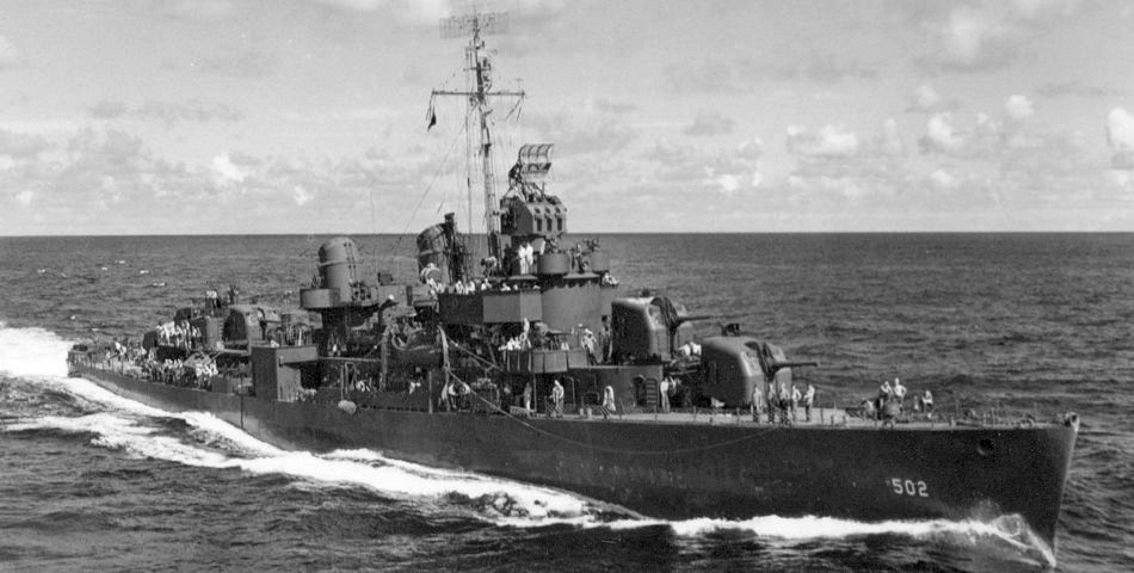
- USS Sigsbee (DD-502)

History

United States
- Namesake: Charles D. Sigsbee
- Builder: Federal Shipbuilding and Drydock Company, Kearny, New Jersey
- Laid down: 22 July 1942
- Launched: 7 December 1942
- Commissioned: 23 January 1943
- Decommissioned: 31 March 1947
- Stricken: 1 December 1974
- Fate: Sold for scrap, 31 July 1975

General characteristics
- Class & type: Fletcher-class destroyer
- Displacement: 2,050 tons
- Length: 376 ft 6 in (114.7 m)
- Beam: 39 ft 8 in (12.1 m)
- Draft: 17 ft 9 in (5.4 m)
- Propulsion: 60,000 shp (45 MW); 2 propellers
- Speed: 35 knots (65 km/h; 40 mph)
- Range: 6,500 nmi. (12,000 km) at 15 kt
- Complement: 336
- Armament: 5 × single Mk 12 5 in (127 mm)/38 guns; 5 × twin 40 mm (1.6 in) Bofors AA guns; 7 × single 20 mm (0.8 in) Oerlikon AA guns; 2 × quintuple 21 in (533 mm) torpedo tubes; 6 × single depth charge throwers; 2 × depth charge racks

USS Sigsbee (DD-502), a Fletcher-class destroyer, was a ship of the United States Navy named for Rear Admiral Charles D. Sigsbee (1845–1923).

== Construction and service ==
Sigsbee was laid down on 22 July 1942 by Federal Shipbuilding and Dry Dock Company, Kearny, New Jersey; launched on 7 December 1942; sponsored by Mrs. A. O. Fischer; and commissioned on 23 January 1943.

=== 1943 ===
Sigsbee completed outfitting three weeks later and sailed to Casco Bay, Maine, for 10 days of gunnery and torpedo practice before sailing to Guantanamo Bay, Cuba, to complete her shakedown. She returned to the Brooklyn Navy Yard, New York City, for post-shakedown overhaul. Upon completion, the destroyer escorted Birmingham (CL-62) to Norfolk. On 4 April, she escorted two tankers to Casco Bay and returned. Next was an escort trip with Independence (CV-22) and Guest (DD-472) to Trinidad, B.W.I., where the aircraft carrier trained her air group. Upon her return to Norfolk, Sigsbee refueled and with Guest and Earle (DD-635) escorted Lexington (CV-16) to Trinidad arriving on 16 May.

On 8 June, the destroyer was detached from the group and proceeded independently to New York. Sigsbee operated between New York, Casco Bay, and Norfolk until 22 July. On that date, the destroyer, with Harrison (DD-573), Daly (DD-519), and Lexington, stood out of Norfolk en route to Pearl Harbor via the Panama Canal. The canal was transited on 27 July, and Sigsbee arrived at Pearl Harbor on 9 August.

In mid-August, Sigsbee joined the task group built around carriers Yorktown (CV-10), Essex (CV-9), and Independence (CVL-22) commanded by Rear Admiral Charles Alan Pownall for raids against Marcus Island in which considerable damage was done to enemy installations. Sigsbee returned to Pearl Harbor on 8 September 1943.

Sigsbee was off Wake Island three weeks later and participated in the bombardment of that island on 5 October.

On 21 October, the destroyer stood out of Pearl Harbor en route to Efate, New Hebrides. She arrived on 5 November and spent the next two weeks in training with transports. On 13 November, Sigsbee sortied with Task Unit 53.1.4 (TU 53.1.4) for the Gilbert Islands. On 22 and 23 November, she bombarded Betio, at Tarawa Atoll. She then returned to Pearl Harbor on 14 December for a yard availability period.

=== 1944 ===
On 22 January 1944, Sigsbee sailed out of Pearl Harbor with Task Force 52 (TF 52) to participate in the assault and capture of Kwajalein, Marshall Islands. The destroyer bombarded Ennylabegan Island on the morning of 31 January and, that evening, Sigsbee and Ringgold (DD-500) entered the lagoon to protect American shipping and provide call-fire for troops ashore. The destroyer remained in the Marshall Islands until 1 March when she departed for Efate. Sigsbee sortied from there, on 20 March, with TF 37 to participate in the bombardment of Kavieng, New Ireland.

In April, Sigsbee patrolled the entrance to Humboldt Bay until the 26th when she screened a convoy to Cape Cretin. After patrolling in the Guadalcanal area for several weeks, Sigsbee joined TU 53.1.14 to take part in the Marianas campaign. The destroyer bombarded the Guam beaches during the period 16 to 18 July as well as covering the underwater demolition teams (UDTs) on the beaches. She then joined the picket screen and remained off Guam until 3 August. Sigsbee returned to Humboldt Bay for a month and then joined TF 77, proceeded to Morotai Island, North Moluccas, and provided fire support for the landings on Cape Podangi in mid-September.

Sigsbee returned to Humboldt Bay and was assigned to TF 78. The force sortied on 3 October for the assault and landings on Leyte in the Philippines on the 20th. After the invasion of Leyte, the destroyer sailed for San Francisco and an overhaul, arriving there on 15 November 1944. Sigsbee was back in Pearl Harbor on 19 January 1945 and then sailed for Ulithi where she joined TF 58, the Fast Carrier Task Force.

=== 1945 ===
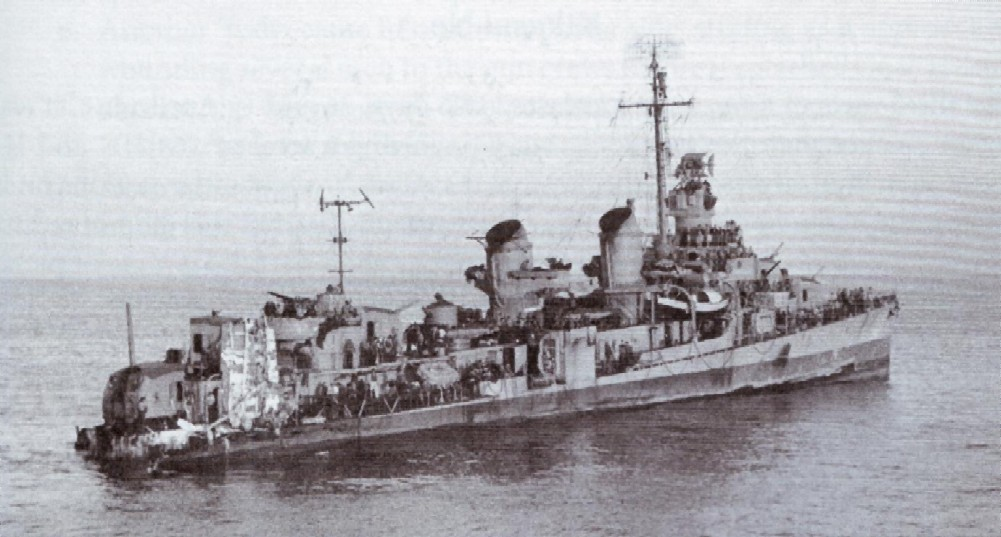
Sigsbee on 14 April 1945.

On 16 February, the task force launched air strikes against Japan and Okinawa in support of the landings on Iwo Jima. On 14 March, the fast carriers and Sigsbee again steamed out of Ulithi for air strikes against the Japanese home islands to neutralize the airfields in preparation for the forthcoming assault on Okinawa. The destroyer then joined the radar picket ships off that island and remained there until 14 April. On that date, the destroyer was struck aft of her number five gun by a kamikaze suicide plane. The port engine was knocked out of commission, the starboard engine could only be run at five knots, steering control was lost, and the ship began to take on water. Commander Gordon Pai'ea Chung-Hoon in command of Sigsbee continued to fight his ship and direct anti-aircraft fire, while at the same time directing damage control parties that saved his ship. Twenty-three sailors were killed in the attack.

Sigsbee was towed south to Guam (out of the battle area) where she was sufficiently repaired for the long tow back to Pearl Harbor (via Eniwetok). The destroyer arrived there on 7 June 1945 and had a complete new 60-foot stern installed. Ready for sea again, the ship sailed out of port on 28 September en route to the east coast of the United States. On 22 October, she arrived at Philadelphia. The following week, the ship moved to Charleston to prepare for inactivation.

=== Post WWII ===
On 1 May 1946, the destroyer was placed in commission, in reserve. On 31 March 1947, Sigsbee was placed in reserve, out of commission, with the Atlantic Reserve Fleet. On 1 December 1974, she was stricken from the Naval Vessel Register, and on 31 July 1975 the ship was sold and broken up for scrap.

== Awards ==
Sigsbee was awarded 11 battle stars for World War II service.
