= William Perry Brown Jr. =

Marine flying ace

William Perry Brown Jr
- Born: December 18, 1923; Lovelady, Texas
- Died: February 24, 1952 (aged 28); North Korea
- Military career
- Allegiance: United States of America
- Branch: United States Navy; United States Marine Corps
- Service years: 1942–1952
- Rank: Captain
- Nickname: "Brownie"
- Units: VMF-311; VMF-323
- Conflicts: World War II; Battle of Okinawa; Korean War
- Awards: Navy Cross (2); Distinguished Flying Cross (2); Purple Heart

William Perry Brown Jr. (December 18, 1923 – February 24, 1952) was a highly decorated United States Marine Corps aviator. He was a flying ace and a recipient of two Navy Crosses and was killed in the Korean War.

== World War II ==
William P. Brown was born in Lovelady, Texas, on December 18, 1923. On September 5, 1942, he enlisted in the United States Navy under the Aviation Cadet Program. He was commissioned in the Marines as a Second Lieutenant on November 16, 1943, and sent to Naval Air Station Jacksonville, Florida, where he attended F4U Corsair Combat Marine Fighter Operation Training. Afterwards, he was assigned to Marine Fighting Squadron 462 (VMF-462) at Marine Corps Air Station El Centro, California.

Brown was sent overseas where he was ultimately assigned to Marine Fighting Squadron 311 (VMF-311) during the battle of Okinawa in April 1945. On April 28, he shot down two Japanese planes. Just six days later on May 4, Brown personally shot down four Japanese planes in four minutes and earned the title of ace as well as his first Navy Cross. He scored a total of seven aerial victories during the battle and was the leading ace of his squadron. Brown then was briefly stationed at Peleliu and was there when the war ended. He was also awarded two Distinguished Flying Crosses during the war.

== Post-World War II ==
Brown was then assigned as a flight instructor at Naval Air Station Pensacola, Florida in December 1945. He married in 1947 and had two daughters with his wife. In September 1947, he was stationed at Marine Corps Air Station El Toro, California and remained there until January 1950. He attended numerous courses afterwards before deploying to Korea. His son was born three months after his death.

== Korean War and death ==
On February 6, 1952, Captain Brown left the United States and arrived in Korea on February 15, where he was assigned to the 1st Marine Aircraft Wing. Just nine days later, on February 24, Brown was temporarily attached to Marine Fighting Squadron 323 (VMF-323) and took part in an eight plane strike against enemy railroads and bridges in Sariwon, North Korea. He successfully dropped a 1,000 pound bomb on a rail line when he spotted an enemy truck convoy entering a heavily defended supply facility. He unhesitatingly pressed a strafing attack on the convoy while taking continuous anti-aircraft fire. Despite his plane taking catastrophic hits and bursting into flames, he continued his dive, firing his guns until his plane crashed and exploded in the middle of the convoy.

William P. Brown's body was never recovered. For his actions during his last combat mission, Brown was posthumously awarded his second Navy Cross. Several cenotaphs have been erected in his honor, including one in his hometown.

== Awards and decorations ==
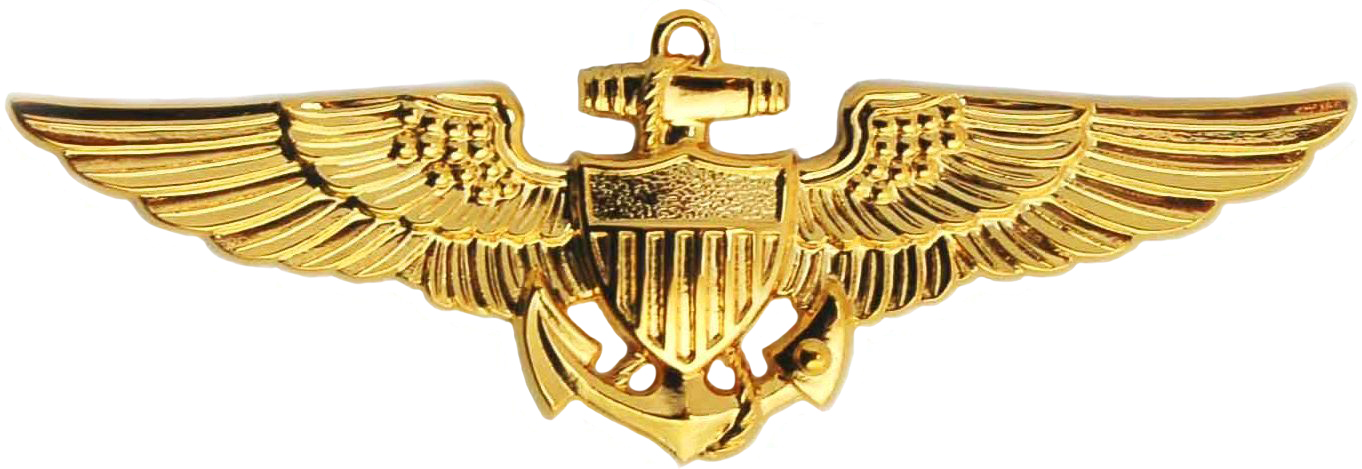

United States Naval Aviator Badge
Navy Cross w/ 5/16" Gold Star
Distinguished Flying Cross w/ 5/16" Gold Star	Purple Heart	Air Medal w/ 5/16" Silver Star and 5/16" Gold Star
Navy Presidential Unit Citation w/ 3/16" Bronze Star	American Campaign Medal	Asiatic-Pacific Campaign Medal w/ two 3/16" Bronze Stars
World War II Victory Medal	National Defense Service Medal	Korean Service Medal w/ 3/16" Bronze Star
Republic of Korea Presidential Unit Citation	United Nations Korea Medal	Republic of Korea War Service Medal

=== 1st Navy Cross citation ===
Citation:

The President of the United States of America takes pleasure in presenting the Navy Cross to Second Lieutenant William Perry Brown, Jr., United States Marine Corps Reserve, for extraordinary heroism and distinguished service in the line of his profession as Pilot of a Fighter Plane in Marine Fighting Squadron THREE HUNDRED ELEVEN (VMF-311), Marine Air Group THIRTY-ONE (MAG-31), FOURTH Marine Aircraft Wing, in aerial combat against enemy Japanese forces off Okinawa, Ryukyu Islands, on 4 May 1945. Leading his division on a combat air patrol, Second Lieutenant Brown sighted a flight of eleven enemy planes. Immediately giving battle, he fought his plane gallantly to shoot down four of the hostile craft and, by his expert flight leadership, contributed materially to the success of his division in destroying the remaining eight Japanese planes. His superb airmanship, courage and devotion to duty were in keeping with the highest traditions of the United States Naval Service.

=== 2nd Navy Cross citation ===
Citation:

The President of the United States of America takes pride in presenting a Gold Star in lieu of a Second Award of the Navy Cross (Posthumously) to Captain William Perry Brown, Jr., United States Marine Corps Reserve, for extraordinary heroism in connection with military operations against an armed enemy of the United Nations while serving as Pilot of a Plane temporarily attached to Marine Fighting Squadron THREE HUNDRED TWENTY-THREE (VMF-323), in action against enemy aggressor forces in the Republic of Korea on 24 February 1952. Volunteering to participate in an eight-plane strike against heavily defended rail and bridge installations along a main enemy supply route at Sariwon, Captain Brown fearlessly pressed home his attack in the face of an intense barrage of hostile anti-aircraft fire and scored a direct hit on a rail line with a 1,000-pound bomb. Spotting a convoy of enemy trucks entering a well-fortified supply center while he was recovering from his initial dive, he immediately launched a low-level strafing run on the objective despite damage to his plane from continuous hostile ground fire. Although his aircraft burst into flames, Captain Brown bravely continued to dive on the vehicles with his guns blazing until his plane crashed and exploded amid the convoy. His outstanding courage, superb airmanship and valiant devotion to duty in the face of overwhelming odds reflect the highest credit upon Captain Brown and the United States Naval Service. He gallantly gave his life for his country.

== See also ==
- Charles J. Loring Jr., Air Force pilot who also crashed plane into enemy target
- Kenneth L. Reusser, Marine pilot also awarded one Navy Cross at Okinawa and one in Korea
- List of World War II aces from the United States
- List of Navy Cross recipients for World War II
- List of Navy Cross recipients for the Korean War
- Louis J. Sebille, Air Force pilot who also crashed plane into enemy target
