= Michael R. Yunck =

American World War II flying ace

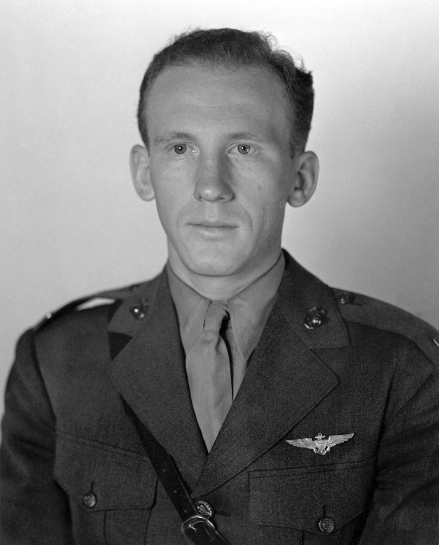
- Born: August 19, 1918; Detroit, Michigan, U.S.
- Died: September 1, 1984 (aged 66)
- Burial place: Arlington National Cemetery
- Military career
- Allegiance: United States
- Branch: United States Marine Corps
- Rank: Colonel
- Conflicts: World War II; Vietnam War; Korean War
- Awards: Silver Star (2); Distinguished Flying Cross; Bronze Star Medal; Purple Heart; Air Medal (3)

Michael Ryan Yunck (August 19, 1918 – September 1, 1984) was a United States Marine Corps aviator and a flying ace of World War II, credited with shooting down five enemy aircraft in aerial combat.

Yunck was born in Detroit, Michigan, on August 19, 1918. During the Guadalcanal Campaign, he flew with Marine Observation Squadron 251 (VMO-251) from October 26 – December 10, 1942, against enemy Japanese forces in the Solomon Islands area. He was awarded the Silver Star for his actions in the war. He later served as a helicopter pilot in the Vietnam War, where he was awarded a second Silver Star after his leg had to be amputated. He was also presented with the Distinguished Flying Cross.
