= Henry G. Sanchez =

Henry Gabriel Sanchez
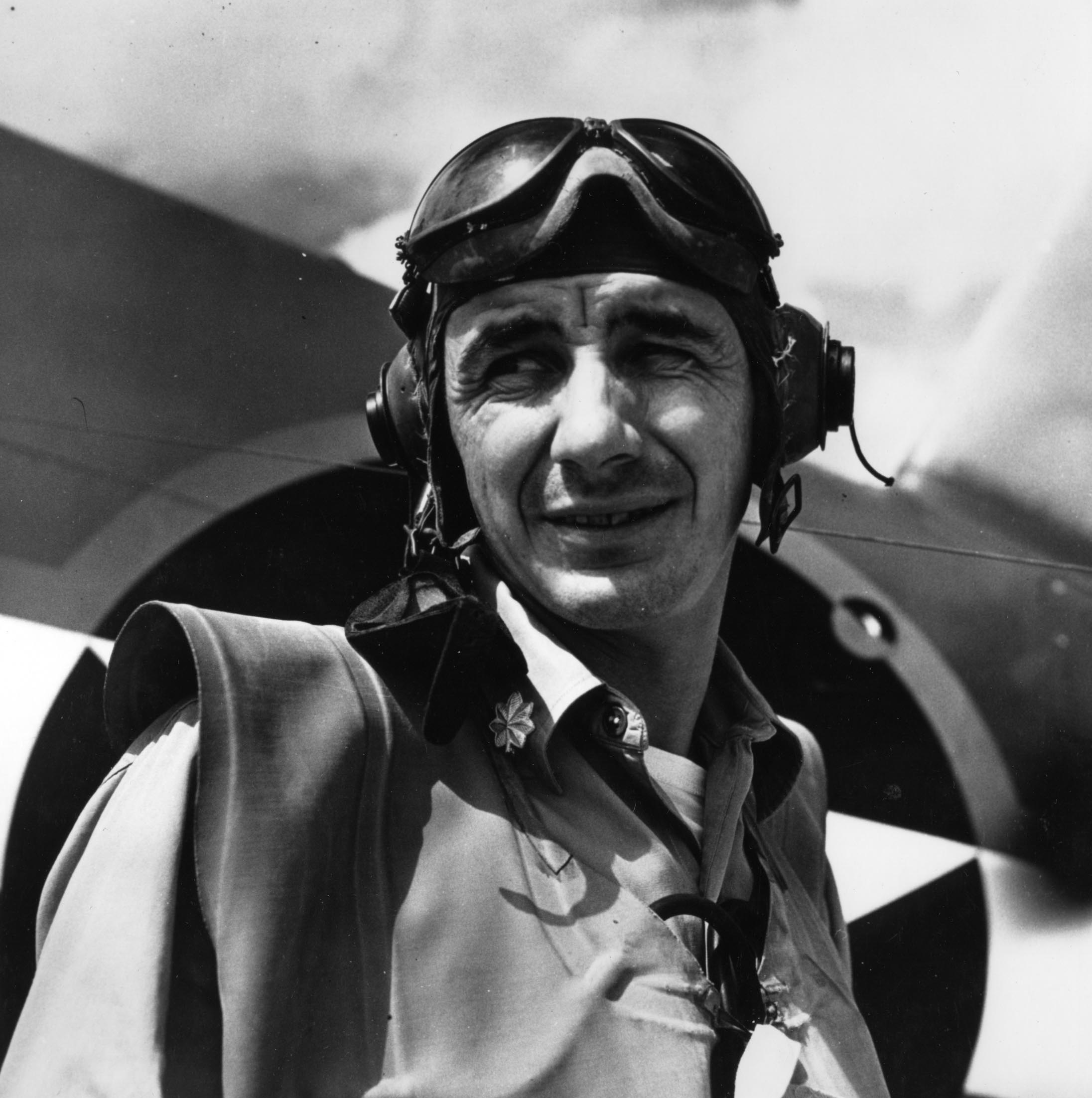
- Commander Henry G. Sanchez, USN, in 1943
- Born: December 29, 1907; New York City, US
- Died: March 13, 1978 (aged 70)
- Burial place: Arlington National Cemetery
- Military career
- Allegiance: United States
- Branch: United States Navy
- Service years: 1930 - 1959
- Rank: Rear Admiral
- Commands: VF-72; USS Suisun
- Conflicts: World War II; Battle of the Santa Cruz Islands
- Awards: Air Medal; Distinguished Flying Cross (US)

Henry Gabriel Sanchez (December 29, 1907 – March 13, 1978) was an Admiral in the United States Navy. During World War II, then-LCDR Sanchez commanded VF-72, an F4F squadron of 37 aircraft, on board the carrier Hornet from July to October 1942. His squadron was responsible for shooting down 38 Japanese airplanes during his command tour, which included the Battle of the Santa Cruz Islands.

== Early years ==
Henry Gabriel Sanchez was born on 29 December 1907 in New York City. He entered the US Naval Academy on 26 June 1926. Upon graduating and being commissioned as an Ensign on 5 June 1930, he chose a career in naval aviation.

After graduation from the Academy in 1930, he had sea duty aboard the USS Trenton until September 1931. He then returned to the United States for flight training at Naval Air Station Pensacola. Designated Naval Aviator on 31 September 1932, he remained at the Pensacola Air Station until October of that year, when he was ordered to report to Aircraft, Battle Force, USS Saratoga, flagship. Later he was assigned to Fighting Squadron Three-B, attached consecutively to the USS Langley and USS Ranger. He continued service with that Squadron until June 1935, and thereafter until April 1937 had duty at the Naval Air Station, Norfolk, Virginia.

From January 1940 to September 1941 he served at the Naval Air Station, Pensacola, Florida. He was assigned to Fighting Squadron Seventy-Two when war was declared on the Axis Powers on 8 December 1941 and in May 1942 he assumed command of that squadron.

== World War II ==
Fighting Squadron Seventy-Two was assigned early in the war to the USS Wasp, and later transferred to the USS Ranger on Atlantic patrol. The Squadron returned to the United States and, after picking up new planes, departed for Pearl Harbor, where they were assigned to the USS Saratoga. Back to Pearl Harbor, they left there to join the ill-fated Hornet, which was sunk on 26 October 1942 by enemy air attack in the Battle of Santa Cruz, Solomon Islands.

Sanchez was awarded the Air Medal for his bravery in this battle. "...Flying in extremely adverse weather over an enemy protected harbor [he] coolly and methodically strafed Japanese patrol planes and destroyers lying at anchor in spite of vigorous anti-aircraft opposition ..." He was also awarded a Gold Star in lieu of a Second Air Medal "for meritorious achievement...attached to the USS Hornet during the Battle of Santa Cruz...from October 15 to 26, 1942. Completing his fifth flight during this period, [he] contributed materially to the success of his squadron..." He was subsequently awarded the Distinguished Flying Cross, and cited in part as follows:

"...Covering a striking group of our scout and torpedo bombers [he] led a division of fighters in a determined and daring attack on Japanese interceptor planes, thus enabling our planes to succeed in their attack mission against enemy heavy naval units including carriers and cruisers..."

After the Hornet was sunk in October 1942, Fighting Squadron Seventy-Two, under his command, was based on the USS Enterprise, and later on smaller carriers, until February 1943.

Upon his return to the United States he had duty from April 1943 to January 1944 as Training Officer of an advanced combat tactics training squadron at the Naval Air Station Lee Field, Jacksonville, Florida. Following fitting out duty in the USS Rudyerd Bay at the Kaiser Shipbuilding Company, Vancouver, Washington, he joined her as Executive Officer upon her commissioning on 25 February 1944. Detached from that carrier escort in April 1944, he again had pre-commissioning duty at the Kaiser Shipbuilding Company, in connection with the USS Thetis Bay. She was commissioned on 21 April 1944, and he reported aboard as Executive Officer.

== Post-war service ==
In November 1945, he transferred to the USS Intrepid, assuming command of that carrier in April 1946, with additional duty as Executive Officer. Detached from command of the Intrepid in October 1946, he served as Chief of the Aviation Ships Section in the Office of the Chief of Naval Operations, Navy Department, Washington, D.C. He remained there until December 1949, at which time he reported as Commanding Officer of the USS Suisun. Ordered detached from that command, he was again in charge of the Aviation Ships Section in the Office of the Chief of Naval Operations, from December 1950 until March 1952. He then served on the staff of the Commander in Chief, US Naval Forces, Eastern Atlantic Mediterranean.

He reverted to his permanent rank of Commander on 1 December 1947, but was later selected for promotion to Captain, confirmed on 21 April 1949. He later advanced to rear admiral on the retired list. He died in 1978.

== Awards and honors ==
In addition to the Distinguished Flying Cross, the Air Medal with Gold Star, and the Presidential Unit Citation with three stars (First Marine Division, Reinforced and the USS Enterprise), Captain Sanchez had the China Service Medal; the American Defense Service Medal, Fleet Clasp; the American Campaign Medal; the European-African-Middle Eastern Campaign Medal; the Asiatic-Pacific Campaign Medal; the World War II Victory Medal; and the Navy Occupation Service Medal, Asia Clasp.
