= Gordon Chung-Hoon =

U.S. Navy admiral (1910–1979)

Gordon Paiʻea Chung-Hoon
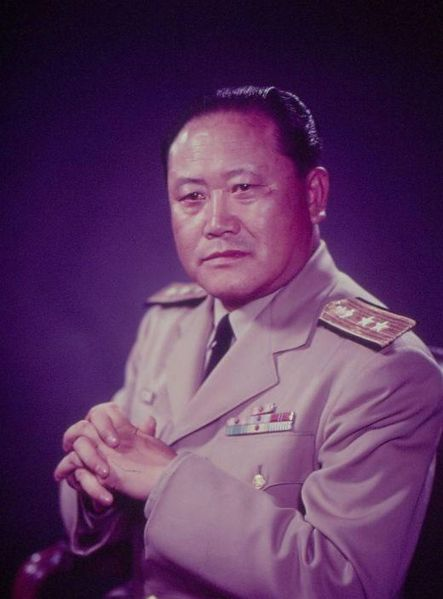
- Navy portrait as a rear admiral
- Born: July 25, 1910; Honolulu, Territory of Hawaii, U.S.
- Died: July 24, 1979 (aged 68); Honolulu, Hawaii, U.S.
- Burial place: National Memorial Cemetery of the Pacific
- Education: United States Naval Academy
- Spouses: Anita Corson (m. 1938; died 1950) Ola Luckey (m. 1952; died 1960) Jean Carlisle (after 1961)
- Military career
- Allegiance: United States of America
- Branch: United States Navy
- Service years: 1934–1959
- Rank: Rear Admiral
- Commands: USS Sigsbee; USS John W. Thomason; USS Norton Sound
- Conflicts: World War II, Korean War
- Awards: Navy Cross; Silver Star
- Other work: Hawaii Director of Agriculture and Conservation

Gordon Chung-Hoon
- Traditional Chinese: 張寬
- Simplified Chinese: 张宽
Transcriptions
Standard Mandarin
- Hanyu Pinyin: Zhāng Kuān

Gordon Paiʻea Chung-Hoon (July 25, 1910 – July 24, 1979) was an admiral in the United States Navy, who served during World War II and was the first Asian American flag officer. He received the Navy Cross and Silver Star for conspicuous gallantry and extraordinary heroism as commanding officer of USS Sigsbee from May 1944 to October 1945.

== Early life ==
He was born in Honolulu, Hawaii, on July 25, 1910. His father, William Chung-Hoon Jr., was a county treasurer and his mother Agnes Punana, a Hawaiian, was a member of the Kaʻahumanu Society. Chung-Hoon was the fourth of five children born to his family. He graduated from Punahou School in 1929.

== Military career ==
Chung-Hoon attended the United States Naval Academy and graduated in May 1934, becoming the first Asian American graduate of the academy. While a student he gained national prominence as the football team's halfback and punter, and in 1934 starred on the team that broke an 11-year winless streak against the Army team. In 1958 Sports Illustrated's Silver Anniversary All-American issue featured Chung-Hoon as one of its 1933 football stars.

After graduation Chung-Hoon was assigned to the cruiser USS Indianapolis as an ensign. As of January 1937 he was serving as an ensign aboard the destroyer USS Montgomery. He was a lieutenant (junior grade) on USS Dent as of January 1939.

=== World War II ===
Chung-Hoon served on the battleship USS Arizona as a lieutenant, but was in Honolulu on a weekend pass during the attack on Pearl Harbor. Chung-Hoon heard the attack from Honolulu and attempted to return to his ship but was delayed by roadblocks and traffic jams. By the time he reached the Arizona the ship had already exploded and sunk.

After the sinking of Arizona, Chung-Hoon served as a naval liaison officer with coastal artillery before becoming executive officer on a destroyer in 1942, working convoy details in the Atlantic. He also served on board the cruiser USS Honolulu.

From May 1944 to October 1945 Chung-Hoon commanded the destroyer USS Sigsbee. In the spring of 1945, Sigsbee assisted in the destruction of 20 enemy planes while screening an aircraft carrier strike force off the Japanese island of Kyūshū. On April 14, 1945, while on radar picket station off Okinawa, a kamikaze crashed into Sigsbee, reducing her starboard engine to five knots (9.3 km/h; 5.8 mph) and knocking out the ship's port engine and steering control. Despite the damage, then Commander Chung-Hoon kept his antiaircraft batteries delivering "prolonged and effective fire" against the continuing Japanese air attack while simultaneously directing the damage control efforts that allowed Sigsbee to make port under her own power. A total of 23 of her crew were killed.

The damage had been severe enough that Admiral William Halsey, Jr. told Chung-Hoon to scuttle the ship. However, Chung-Hoon declined to do so, telling the admiral "No, I have kids on here that can't swim and I'm not putting them in the water. I'll take her back."

The next day Chung-Hoon led a burial at sea for the dead. One crewmate said of Chung-Hoon during the burial, "I often remember that the only man tough enough not to duck, was also the only man tender enough to cry."

For Chung-Hoon's service aboard Sigsbee he received the Navy Cross and the Silver Star for conspicuous gallantry and extraordinary heroism.

During the war, two of Chung-Hoon's brothers served in the army in the Pacific theater.

=== Postwar ===
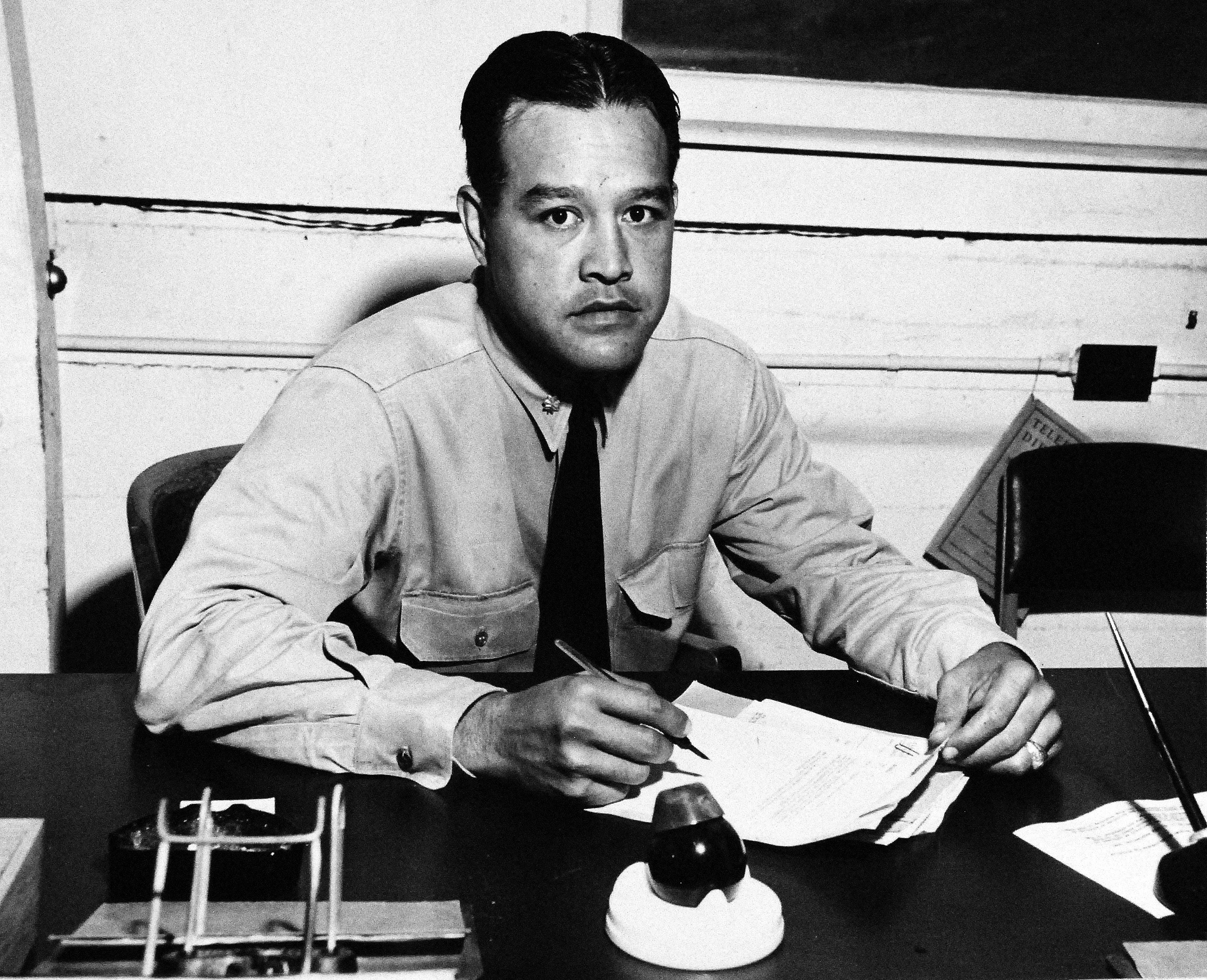
Chung-Hoon as a young officer

After Sigsbee was inactivated following the end of the war, Chung-Hoon was transferred to Pearl Harbor in November as officer in charge of the Special Activities Division of Service Force, Pacific Fleet, responsible for various administrative duties.

From August 16, 1950, to March 7, 1952, Chung-Hoon commanded the destroyer USS John W. Thomason during the Korean War. Under Chung-Hoon's command the destroyer operated as part of the 7th Fleet, patrolling off the coast of Korea and taking part in gun bombardments.

He was promoted to the rank of captain on 1 July 1953.

He served as the Commanding Officer of Afloat Training Group Middle Pacific from March to June 1954, where he directed the training and certification of Hawaii based ships.

Chung-Hoon served as captain of the guided missile testing ship USS Norton Sound between July 1956 and August 1957. He was subsequently transferred to the Office of the Chief of Naval Operations in Washington, D.C., his last post. Chung-Hoon retired in October 1959 and was promoted to rear admiral upon retirement, making him the first Asian American flag officer of the United States Navy.

== Later life and legacy ==
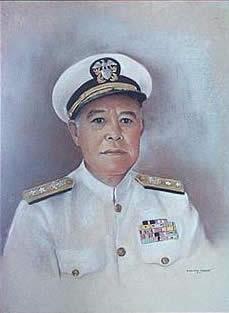
Portrait of Chung-Hoon

He was appointed to be the director of the Hawaii Department of Agriculture by the first Governor of the State of Hawaii, William F. Quinn, and held that position between January 1961 and June 1963. Chung-Hoon subsequently worked as a realtor. He made a foray into politics by running as a Republican for one of the four seats representing the Hawaii 7th State Senate District in 1966, but finished fifth in the primary. Chung-Hoon died on July 24, 1979, at Tripler Army Medical Center in Honolulu.

The Arleigh Burke-class destroyer USS Chung-Hoon, commissioned in 2004, is named for him.

== Personal life ==
Chung-Hoon first married Anita Corson while serving aboard Dent in December 1938; she died of cancer in 1950. He married Ola Luckey in 1952, and later retired in order to spend more time with her. Luckey died of cancer in April 1960, months after they had returned to Honolulu following his retirement. He married his third wife, travel consultant Jean Carlisle (died 2001), in January 1961, adopting her son, Perry White; Chung-Hoon was otherwise childless.

== Awards and honors ==

| Navy Cross | Silver Star | China Service Medal |
| American Defense Service Medal w/ Fleet Clasp (3/16" Bronze Star) | American Campaign Medal | European–African–Middle Eastern Campaign Medal |
| Asiatic-Pacific Campaign Medal w/ one 3/16" Silver Star and two 3/16" Bronze Stars | World War II Victory Medal | Navy Occupation Service Medal w/ 'Asia' clasp |
| National Defense Service Medal | Korean Service Medal w/ four 3/16" Bronze Stars | Republic of Korea Presidential Unit Citation |
| United Nations Korea Medal | Republic of Korea War Service Medal | Philippine Liberation Medal |

=== Navy Cross citation ===
The President of the United States of America takes pleasure in presenting the Navy Cross to Commander Gordon Paiea Chung-Hoon, United States Navy, for extraordinary heroism and distinguished service in the line of this profession as Commanding Officer of the Destroyer U.S.S. SIGSBEE (DD-502), a unit of an Advanced Picket Group, in action against enemy Japanese forces in the vicinity of Okinawa, Ryukyu Islands, on 14 April 1945. Although his ship suffered major damage when struck by an enemy plane and all power was lost, Commander Chung-Hoon coolly carried out defensive maneuvers and directed his anti-aircraft batteries in delivering prolonged and effective fire against the continued heavy enemy air attack. Afterwards, he supervised damage-control procedure which resulted in his ship being made sea-worthy for a safe return to port under its own restored power. Commander Chung-Hoon's gallant fighting spirit, courage and unwavering devotion to duty were in keeping with the highest traditions of the United States Naval Service.

=== Silver Star citation ===
The President of the United States of America takes pleasure in presenting the Silver Star to Commander Gordon Paiea Chung-Hoon, United States Navy, for conspicuous gallantry and intrepidity as Commanding Officer of the Destroyer U.S.S. SIGSBEE (DD-502), in action against enemy Japanese forces in the vicinity of Kyushu Island, Japan, from 17 March 1945 to 10 April 1945. Commanding an important unit of an advanced picket group, Commander Chung-Hoon engaged in offensive operations against the enemy aerial forces and assisted in destroying twenty enemy planes. Subsequently attacked by six planes, he directed the SIGSBEE in shooting down one dive bomber before it could penetrate the formation. By his courage and leadership, he contributed materially to the successful operation of the SIGSBEE and his devotion to duty was in keeping with the highest traditions of the United States Naval Service.
