= VMFA-323 =

Marine Fighter Attack Squadron 323
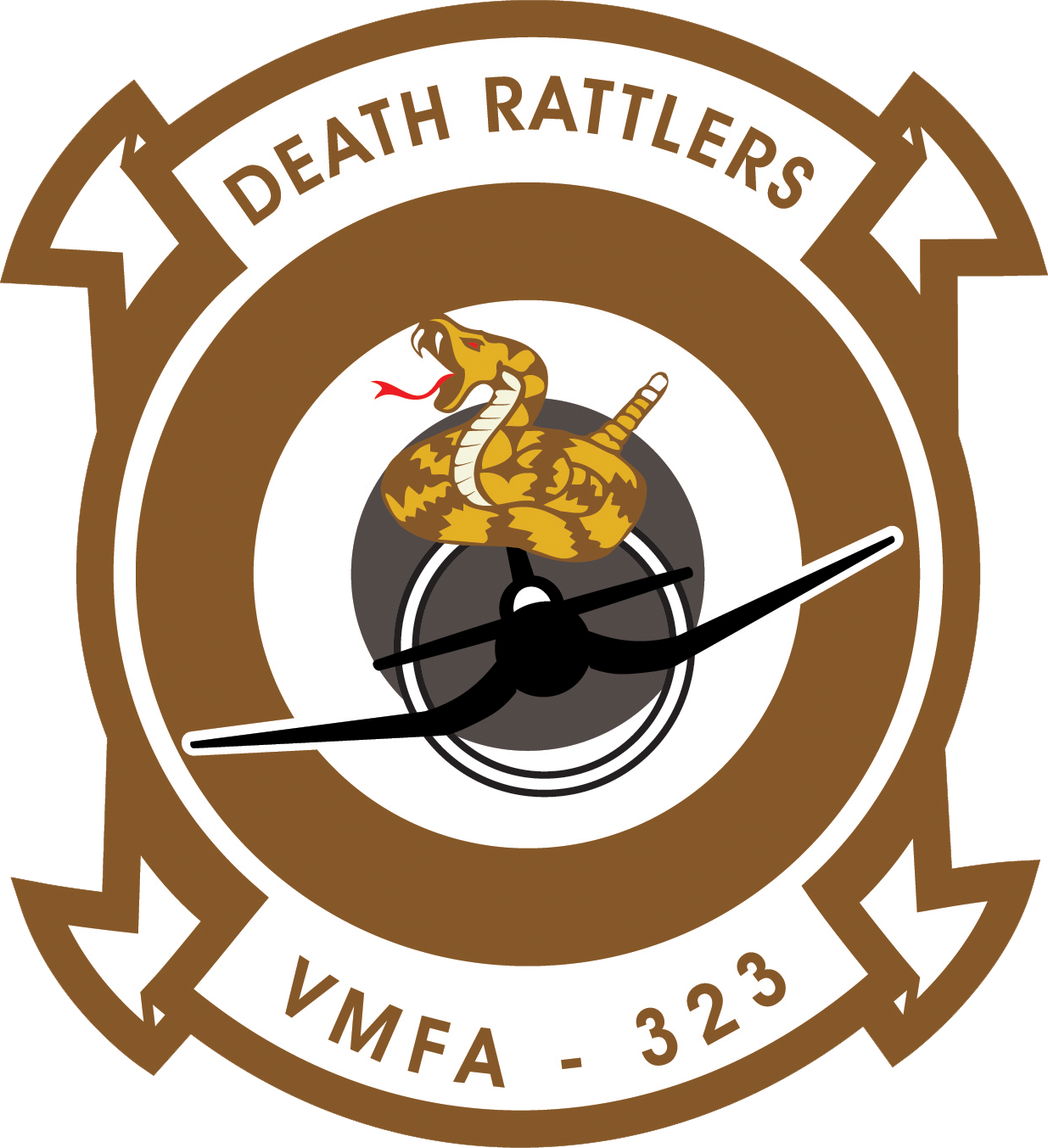
- Marine Fighter Attack Squadron 323 insignia
- Active: 1 August 1943 - present
- Country: United States of America
- Branch: United States Marine Corps
- Type: Aircraft Carrier-Based Fighter/Attack
- Role: Close air support Air interdiction Aerial reconnaissance
- Part of: Marine Aircraft Group 11; 3rd Marine Aircraft Wing
- Garrison/HQ: Marine Corps Air Station Miramar, California
- Nickname: Death Rattlers
- Motto: "Come to Fight - Come to Win" or unofficially "Come to Drink - Come to Fight"
- Colors: WS/NA
- Engagements: World War II; Battle of Okinawa; Korean War; Battle of Inchon; Battle of Chosin Reservoir; Attack on the Sui-ho Dam; Dominican Civil War; Vietnam War; Operation Eagle Claw; Operation El Dorado Canyon; Operation Desert Storm; Operation Southern Watch; Global war on terrorism; Operation Enduring Freedom; Operation Iraqi Freedom; 2003 invasion of Iraq; Operation Inherent Resolve

Commanders
- Current commander: LtCol John J. Kress

Aircraft flown
- Fighter: F4U Corsair (1943-53); F9F Panther (1953-54); F9F Cougar (1954-56); FJ-4 Fury (1956-59); F-8 Crusader (1959-64); F-4 Phantom II (1964-82); F/A-18 Hornet (1982-present); F-35C Lightning II (future)

Marine Fighter Attack Training Squadron 323 (VMFAT-323) is a Fleet Replacement Detachment squadron of the United States Marine Corps. The squadron is equipped with the McDonnell Douglas F/A-18C and F/A-18D Legacy Hornet and is based at Marine Corps Air Station Miramar, California, United States. It falls under the command of Marine Aircraft Group 11 (MAG-11) and the 3rd Marine Aircraft Wing (3rd MAW). Their tail code is WS and their radio callsign is Snake and Viper.

== History ==
=== World War II ===
VMF-323 was commissioned 1 August 1943, at Marine Corps Air Station Cherry Point, North Carolina. According to oral history, the squadron got its name from three fighter pilots who killed a 6-foot (1.8 m) rattlesnake and hung its skin in the squadron's ready room. VMF-323 began training in F4U Corsairs almost immediately for combat in the Pacific theater of World War II. On 16 December 1943, the squadron received orders to prepare to move to the west coast of the United States beginning the first week of January 1944. Much of the new squadron's training was done at Marine Corps Air Station El Centro and Marine Corps Air Station Camp Pendleton, California. In July 1944, the Death Rattlers departed for the Pacific aboard USS Long Island. For the next nine months, VMF-323 flew training missions from secure island bases in the South Pacific.

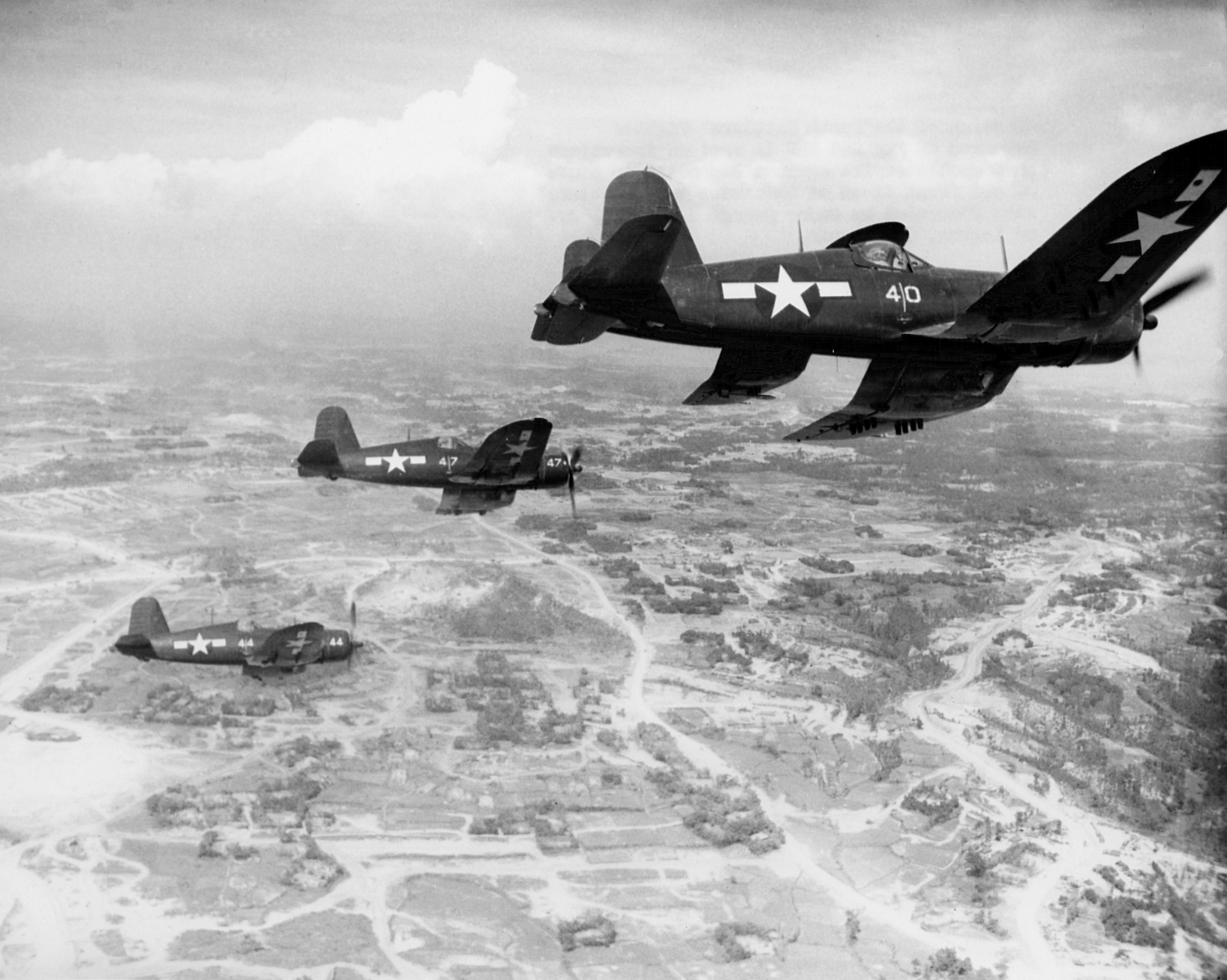
VMF-323 FG-1Ds over Okinawa in 1945

On 9 April 1945, 24 aircraft from the Death Rattlers launched from the USS White Plains (CVE-66) and flew into Kadena airfield in support of Operation Iceberg during the Battle of Okinawa. Combat operations commenced the following day. Between then and the Japanese surrender in August, the Death Rattlers racked up 124 Japanese planes shot down without a single loss. The highest total of any squadron during the battle. Twelve Death Rattlers became aces.

After the war, the Death Rattlers were based at Marine Corps Air Station El Toro, where they conducted training exercises. It was around this time that the squadron appeared in the 1949 movie Sands of Iwo Jima.

=== Korean War and post-war ===
When the Korean War began in 1950, VMF-323 began combat operations from USS Badoeng Strait as part of Marine Aircraft Group 33 (MAG-33), supporting ground forces in the Battle of Pusan Perimeter, Battle of Inchon, Battle of Chosin Reservoir and almost every other major campaign of the conflict. During action near Kosong, on 11 August 1950, a VMF-323 Corsair pilot, Captain Vivian M. Moses, became the first Marine aviator killed in Korea. Around January 1951, VMF-323 performed their likely last combat operations from the USS Badoeng Strait and moved with MAG-33 to Bofu Airbase in Honshu Japan. Shortly afterward in Feb 1951 VMF-323 was rebased to the K-1 airfield near Pusan. Conditions at K-1 were reportedly harsh, as the squadron was living in tents, had no furniture, and was eating K-Rations in freezing weather. In March, the squadron was transferred officially to Marine Aircraft Group 12 (MAG-12). From 20 April onward the difficult non-hard-surface runway at the K-16 airfield near Seoul was used as a forward operating base for rearming and refueling, while K-1 was used for repair and scheduled maintenance. In June 1951, VMF-323 moved briefly to Itami Air Base in Osaka Japan, and then embarked on the USS Sicily. The squadron replaced its F4U-4Bs with the F4U-4 when it went aboard. Combat operations were flown off the Sicily for a few months. On 20 Sep, the Death Rattlers left the Sicily for Itami, changed back to F4U-4Bs, and rebased again to K-1. On 30 Oct 1951 the squadron was rebased to the K-18 near Kangnung, and on 21 April 1952, rebased to K-6 near Pyeongtaek. The unit also took part in the attack on the Sui-ho Dam in June 1952.

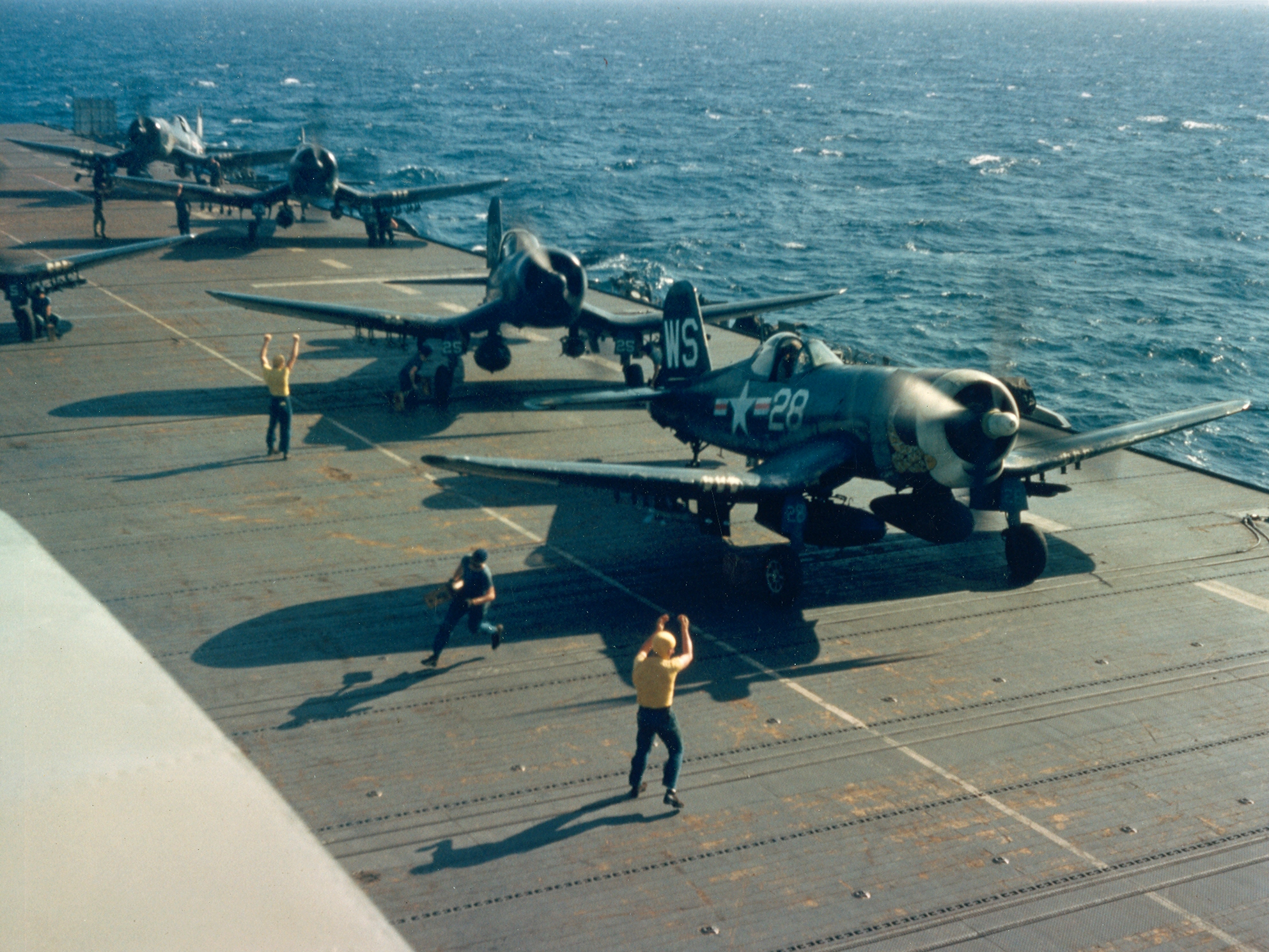
VMF-323 F4U-4s on USS Sicily, in 1951

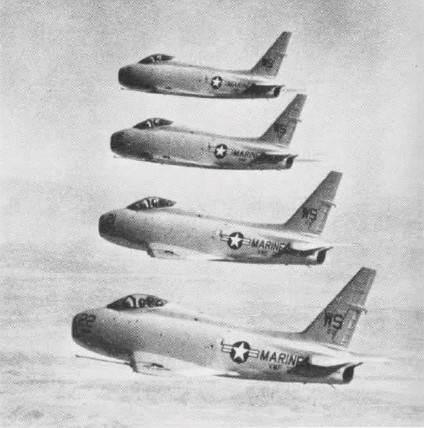
FJ-4Bs of VMF-323, ca. 1957.

The squadron was re-designated Marine Attack Squadron 323 (VMA-323) in June, 1952. Around this time the 24 aircraft complement was changed to include approximately half F4U-4Bs and half of the more heavily armored ground attack focused AU-1s. The Death Rattlers left Korea in July 1953. VMA-323 was the Marine fixed-wing attack squadron with the longest overseas service during the Korean War, accumulating a total of 48,677 hours of flight time since their August 1950 arrival in Korea. In total, 16 Death Rattlers were Killed In Action (the same number of losses as in WWII) and 4 became POWs.

Once back home, the squadron began flying the F9F Panther and then the F9F Cougar, a swept-wing version of the Panther. In 1956 the squadron adopted the FJ-4 Fury, with which it deployed to the western Pacific in 1957. That year, the Death Rattlers flew armed patrols over the Quemoy and Matsu islands to support Chinese nationalist forces.

The squadron was reestablished at MCAS El Toro and received its first F8U Crusaders in the summer of 1958. it trained in 1958 and 1959 was then assigned to USS Oriskany.

In 1964, the squadron returned to MCAS Cherry Point, where they received their present designation of Marine Fighter Attack Squadron 323 (VMFA-323). This same year, the Death Rattlers began flying the F-4 Phantom II. During the Dominican Crisis in 1965, the Death Rattlers provided air cover while American citizens were evacuated.

=== Vietnam War ===
As the United States grew closer to war in South Vietnam, the Death Rattlers deployed to Da Nang Air Base beginning on 25 October 1965. Combat operations started the day after they arrived. The squadron lost its first aircraft a week after they arrived when the squadron's executive officer was shot down by a surface-to-air missile over North Vietnam. It was the only Marine F-4 felled by a SAM during the war. The squadron remained in Vietnam until 1969, flying combat sorties from Da Nang and Chu Lai.

=== 1980s to 2001 ===
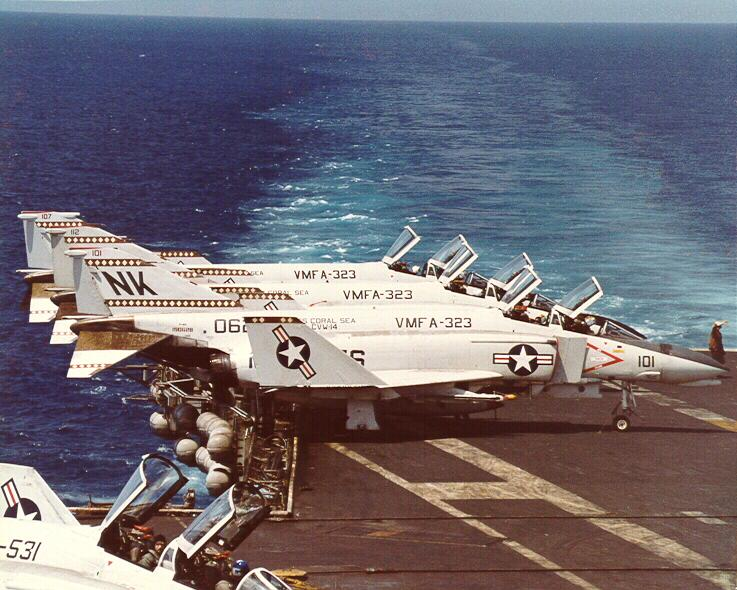
F-4Ns of VMFA-323 on USS Coral Sea, 1979–80.

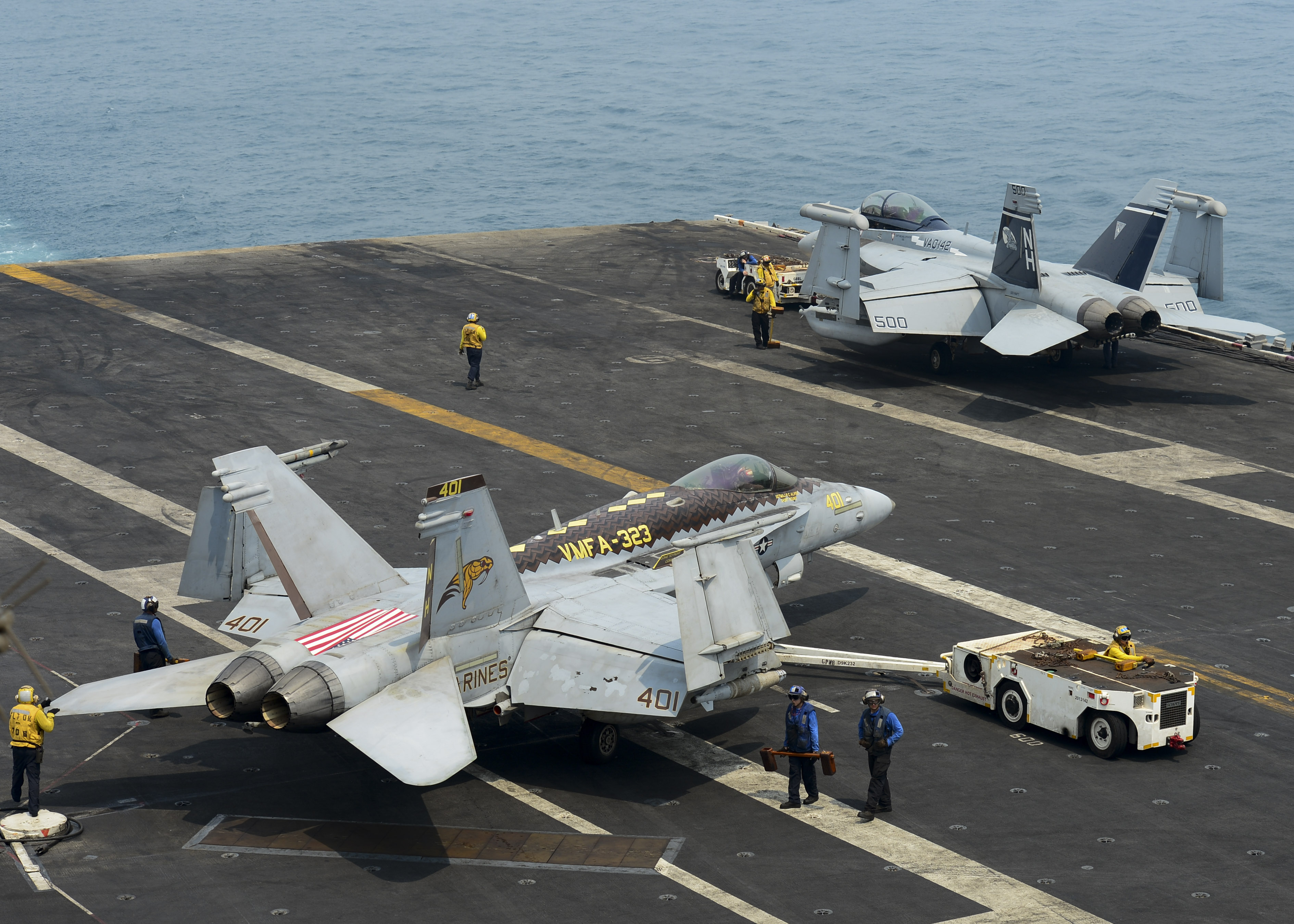
A VMFA-323 F/A-18C shown with CVW-11 tail code of NH instead of the usual WS aboard USS Nimitz, in August 2017.

The squadron embarked on its only aircraft carrier cruise in the F-4 Phantom in November 1979 aboard USS Coral Sea. After liberty stops in, Korea, Thailand, and Singapore, Coral Sea arrived in the Arabian Sea in January 1980 flying protection caps for Coral Sea and USS Nimitz. On 24 April 1980, VMFA-323 was prepared to fly combat missions into southern Iran in support of US hostages rescue attempt Operation Eagle Claw with the mission to shoot down any Iranian combat aircraft that attempted to take off. When Operation Eagle Claw failed, VMFA-323 F-4s flew missions around the clock until all US support ships had exited the Persian Gulf and the Gulf of Oman. The squadron was awarded the Presidential Unit Citation for its service. The squadron arrived back at Subic Bay, RP after 102 straight days at sea.

On 14 September 1982, VMFA-323 transitioned to its current aircraft, the F/A-18 Hornet. In October 1985, the squadron deployed again aboard Coral Sea, this time to the Mediterranean Sea. In spring of 1986 during freedom of navigation exercises held in international waters and airspace off the coast of Libya. On 15 April 1986, the squadron provided SAM suppression and fighter Combat Air Patrol (CAP) sorties during Operation El Dorado Canyon.

In 1994, 1995, 1997, 1999, and 2001 the Death Rattlers flew missions in support of Operation Southern Watch.

=== Global war on terrorism ===
On 2 November 2002, VMFA-323 deployed aboard USS Constellation as part of CVW-2 to conduct Operation Southern Watch. While on this deployment, the Death Rattlers transitioned from Operation Southern Watch to Operation Iraqi Freedom conducting sorties into Baghdad on the first night of the war.

On 2 May 2005, two F/A-18C Hornet fighter jets from VMFA-323, BuNo 164721 and BuNo 164732, collided over south-central Iraq, during a sortie from USS Carl Vinson, killing the executive officer and a junior officer.

=== 2020 & beyond ===
With the deactivation of VMFAT-101 on 1 October 2023, the Death Rattlers took over the training responsibilities with a Fleet Replacement detachment for until FY2027.

On 8 June 2020, VMFA-323 departed on their final Carrier Cruise aboard CVN-68 USS Nimitz, Flying sorties over Syria, Iraq, Somalia, and Afghanistan.

On 25 February 2021, the Squadron launched of an aircraft carrier for the final time in the F/A-18 as they returned home to MCAS Miramar.

On 18 March 2024, the first photograph of VMFA-323 using an F/A-18D Legacy Hornet was taken. Almost all Marine F/A-18 squadrons have begun to use the 2-seat Legacy Hornet which traditionally have been reserved for non-combat training roles. This comes as the squadron's single seat aircraft age into retirement, hitting their maximum allowed flight hours. The F/A-18Ds will help the squadron stay combat ready as they transition to the F-35.

On 10 October 2026, VMFA-323 was redesignated as VMFAT-323, fully taking over as the Fleet Replacement Detachment (FRD) responsibilities left after VMFAT-101's deactivation. The squadron has given up their combat role, now flying with the primary roll of training Marine aviators.

In accordance with the 2025 Aviation Plan, VMFA-323 is to begin transitioning to the F-35C Lightning II in FY2029 and complete the transition no later than FY2030.

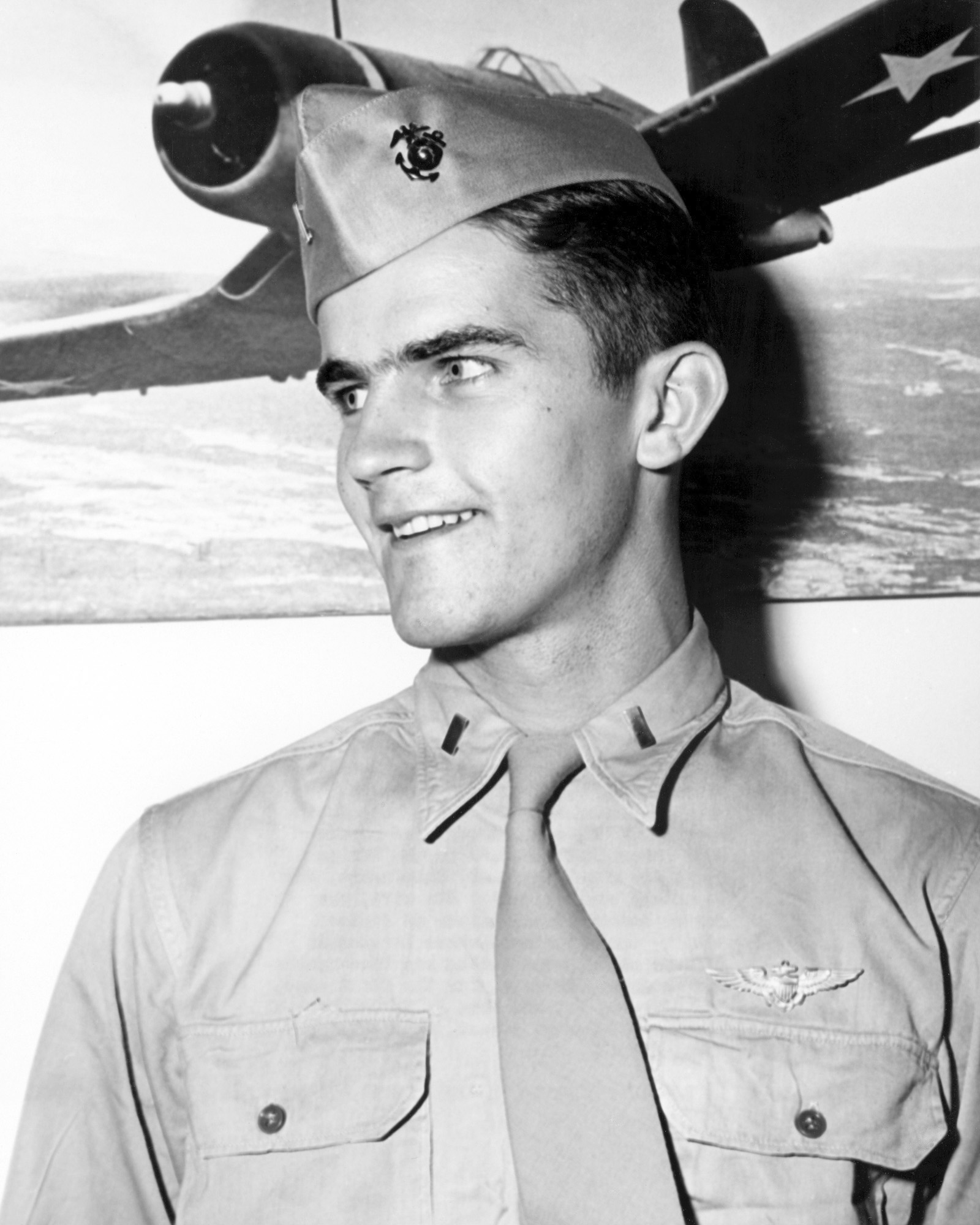
Lt. Jeremiah J. O'Keefe in 1945

== Squadron aces ==
- Brian M. Mitchell 8.0
- Jeremiah J. O'Keefe - 7.0
- John W. Ruhsam - 7.0
- Robert Wade - 7.0
- Joseph V. Dillard - 6.3
- Dewey F. Durnford - 6.3
- Francis A. Terrill - 6.1
- George C. Axtell - 6.0
- Jefferson D. Dorroh - 6.0
- William L. Hood - 5.5
- Stuart C. Alley Jr. - 5.0
- Charles W. Drake - 5.0
- Albert P. Wells - 5.0

== Miscellaneous Information ==
- An F-4N Phantom painted with VMFA-323 squadron markings can be seen on the flight deck of the Intrepid Sea-Air-Space Museum.
- Jerry Coleman, then second baseman for the New York Yankees, flew with VMA-323 during the Korean War.

== See also ==
- List of active United States Marine Corps aircraft squadrons
- United States Marine Corps Aviation
- CVW-17
