= USS Badoeng Strait =

Commencement Bay-class escort carrier of the US Navy

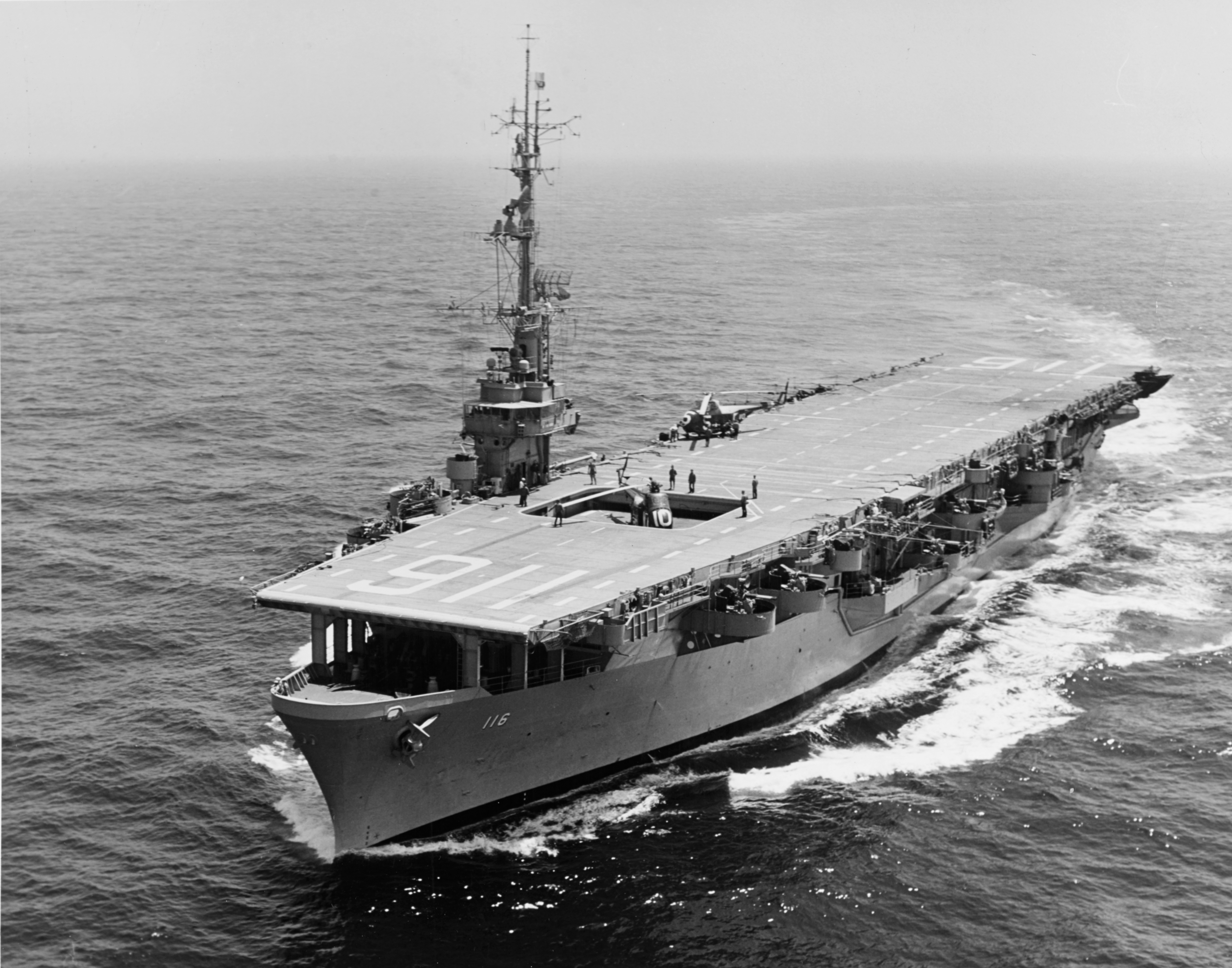
- Badoeng Strait operating helicopters in 1954

History

United States
- Name: Badoeng Strait
- Namesake: Battle of Badung Strait
- Builder: Todd-Pacific Shipyards
- Laid down: 18 August 1944
- Launched: 15 February 1945
- Commissioned: 14 November 1945
- Decommissioned: 17 May 1957
- Nickname(s): "Bing Ding"
- Fate: Sold and scrapped 1972

General characteristics
- Class & type: Commencement Bay-class escort carrier
- Displacement: 21,397 long tons (21,740 t)
- Length: 557 ft 1 in (169.80 m) loa
- Beam: 75 ft (23 m)
- Draft: 32 ft (9.8 m)
- Installed power: 16,000 shp (12,000 kW); 4 × boilers
- Propulsion: 2 × Steam turbines; 2 × screw propellers
- Speed: 19 knots (35 km/h; 22 mph)
- Complement: 1,066
- Armament: 2 × 5 in (127 mm) dual-purpose guns; 36 × 40 mm (1.6 in) Bofors AA guns; 20 × 20 mm (0.8 in) Oerlikon AA guns
- Aircraft carried: 33
- Aviation facilities: 2 × aircraft catapults

USS Badoeng Strait was a Commencement Bay-class escort carrier of the United States Navy during the Korean War. The Commencement Bay class were built during World War II, and were an improvement over the earlier Sangamon class, which were converted from oil tankers. They were capable of carrying an air group of 33 planes and were armed with an anti-aircraft battery of 5 in (127 mm), 40 mm (1.6 in), and 20 mm (0.8 in) guns. The ships were capable of a top speed of 19 knots (35 km/h; 22 mph), and due to their origin as tankers, had extensive fuel storage.

She was named after the Badung Strait, located between the Indonesian islands of Bali and Nusa Besar, which was the site of a World War II battle in February 1942, between American–Netherlands and Japanese naval forces.

== Design ==
In 1941, as United States participation in World War II became increasingly likely, the US Navy embarked on a construction program for escort carriers, which were converted from transport ships of various types. Many of the escort carrier types were converted from C3-type transports, but the Sangamon-class escort carriers were instead rebuilt oil tankers. These proved to be very successful ships, and the Commencement Bay class, authorized for Fiscal Year 1944, were an improved version of the Sangamon design. The new ships were faster, had improved aviation facilities, and had better internal compartmentation. They proved to be the most successful of the escort carriers, and the only class to be retained in active service after the war, since they were large enough to operate newer aircraft.

Badoeng Strait was 557 ft 1 in (169.80 m) long overall, with a beam of 75 ft (23 m) at the waterline, which extended to 105 ft 2 in (32.05 m) at maximum. She displaced 21,397 long tons (21,740 t) at full load, of which 12,876 long tons (13,083 t) could be fuel oil (though some of her storage tanks were converted to permanently store seawater for ballast), and at full load she had a draft of 27 ft 11 in (8.51 m). The ship's superstructure consisted of a small island. She had a complement of 1,066 officers and enlisted men.

The ship was powered by two Allis-Chalmers geared steam turbines, each driving one screw propeller, using steam provided by four Combustion Engineering-manufactured water-tube boilers. The propulsion system was rated to produce a total of 16,000 shp (12,000 kW) for a top speed of 19 knots (35 km/h; 22 mph). Given the very large storage capacity for oil, the ships of the Commencement Bay class could steam for some 23,900 nautical miles (44,300 km; 27,500 mi) at a speed of 15 knots (28 km/h; 17 mph).

Her defensive anti-aircraft armament consisted of two 5 in (127 mm) dual-purpose guns in single mounts, thirty-six 40 mm (2 in) Bofors guns, and twenty 20 mm (1 in) Oerlikon light AA cannons. The Bofors guns were placed in three quadruple and twelve twin mounts, while the Oerlikon guns were all mounted individually. She carried 33 planes, which could be launched from two aircraft catapults. Two elevators transferred aircraft from the hangar to the flight deck.

== Service history ==
=== Construction and early career ===
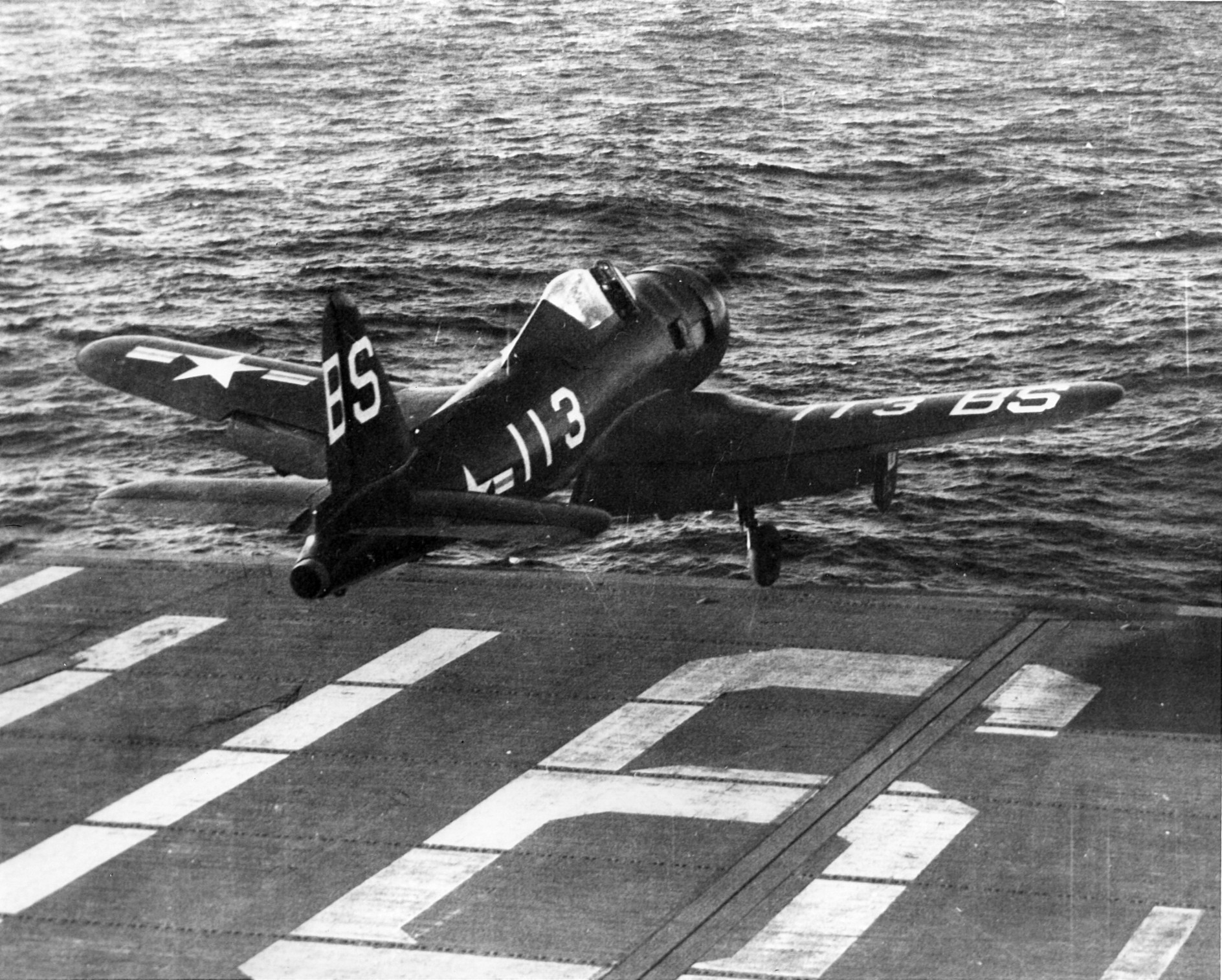
A Ryan FR-1 Fireball launching from Badoeng Strait, 1947.

The first fifteen ships of the Commencement Bay class were ordered on 23 January 1943, allocated to Fiscal Year 1944. The ship, originally to have been named San Alberto Bay, was laid down on 18 August 1944, at the Todd-Pacific Shipyard in Tacoma, Washington. She was renamed Baedoeng Strait and was launched on 15 February 1945, after which she was moved to the Commercial Iron Works for fitting-out work. She was commissioned into active service on 14 November 1945, by which time World War II had ended. Badoeng Strait then underwent additional work to modify her to serve as a flagship, after which she sailed for San Diego, California, for her shakedown cruise and initial training. There, she carried out air qualification training with her new aircrew. She got underway again in late March 1946, bound for Pearl Harbor, which she reached on 2 April. She then returned to California on 20 April, where she was temporarily placed in reserve at San Diego.

On 6 January 1947, Badoeng Strait was recommissioned, and she went to sea on 14 January to begin training exercises, including flight operations with her new aircraft. She made another visit to Pearl Harbor from 11 to 26 February, before resuming training exercises off California that lasted through June. During this period, she alternated between Carrier Divisions 15 and 17, serving as the flagship of the divisions. On 5 July, Badoeng Strait went to the San Francisco Naval Shipyard for an overhaul that lasted until 11 November. She then embarked on a shakedown cruise before resuming training operations through December. The ship began a cruise to the western Pacific on 5 January 1948 to ferry aircraft to the American base at Apra Harbor, Guam. There, she picked up passengers for the voyage back to California, arriving back in San Diego on 10 February. She next ferried aircraft to Pearl Harbor in April, followed by another overhaul at Hunters Point Naval Shipyard that began on 24 May and lasted for three months. She departed for San Diego on 16 June and spent the following four months carrying out anti-submarine warfare training. The rest of the year saw the ship confined to port.

In early January 1949, Badoeng Strait took aboard Composite Squadron VC-21, which was equipped with TBM-3 Avenger bombers for anti-submarine exercises, which continued until 25 February. She moved north to the Puget Sound Naval Shipyard for another overhaul on 30 March that lasted into early July, when she returned to San Diego. She returned to anti-submarine training with VC-21 and VC-11 from July through September. In October, she went to Hawaii for a two-week training period, before returning to San Diego on 14 November. The ship remained in port for the net two months, before resuming training operations in the middle of January 1950. She operated out of San Diego for the next six months before moving to Naval Air Station Alameda on 16 June, where she took on a contingent of 223 Naval Reserve Officers Training Corps cadets for a training cruise.

=== Korean War ===
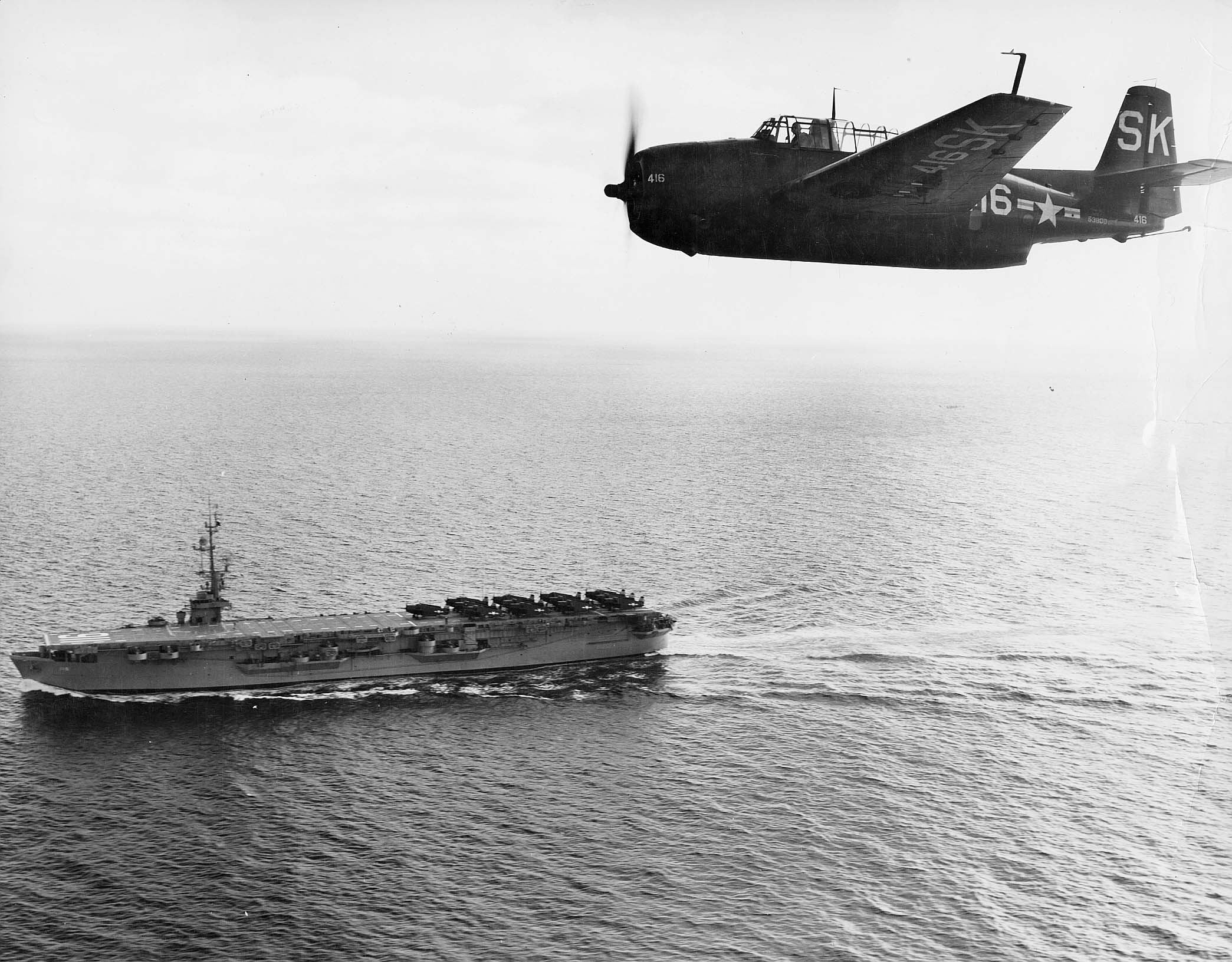
A TBM-3 Avenger flying over Badoeng Strait, c. 1950

The Korean War broke out on 25 June 1950, when North Korea invaded the South, and the United Nations intervened two days later. Badoeng Strait was ordered to join the forces assembling to defeat the North Korean invasion. The ship stopped in Pearl Harbor to disembark the NROTC cadets still aboard and then returned to San Diego to take on supplies and ammunition for wartime operations. On 14 July, she departed with the Marine Corps squadrons MAG-33 and VMF-323 aboard, bound for Kobe, Japan. While cruising near the Marianas Islands on 27 July, Badoeng Strait came alongside the dock landing ship Gunston Hall to refuel that vessel. The two ships collided during refueling, but neither was damaged seriously. Badoeng Strait arrived in Kobe on 31 July and unloaded equipment before sortieing on 4 August to begin combat operations in the Tsushima Strait. The following day, one of VMF-323's Vought F4U Corsair fighters crashed on landing, injuring the pilot and destroying the aircraft.

Beginning on 6 August, the ship's aircraft began attacking North Korean forces and infrastructure in south-western Korea as they advanced on South Korean and American forces in the Battle of the Pusan Perimeter. Badoeng Strait's pilots carried out nearly 240 raids for the next week, and during this period, they supported an attack by the 1st Marine Brigade toward Jinju. The ship lost five aircraft during these operations, though four of the pilots survived. Badoeng Strait then briefly left to refuel and rearm at Sasebo, Japan, before resuming operations on 15 August. She and her sister ship Sicily provided further support to the 1st Marine Brigade until 23 August. Badoeng Strait was then detached to cover the withdrawal of the British destroyer HMS Comus, which had been damaged by North Korean aircraft. The carrier's fighters provided combat air patrol over the damaged destroyer for two days as it passed through the Yellow Sea, and on 26 August, Badoeng Strait returned to the Tsushima Strait for further attacks on North Korean forces.

The ship returned to Sasebo on 29 August for another round of replenishment, departing again on 5 September. Her aircraft resumed attacks on North Korean positions the next day as Allied forces began preparations for the imminent landing at Incheon. Badoeng Strait returned to Sasebo on 11 September, then returned to operations off Korea two days later. Her aircraft supported Allied forces as they fought their way inland from Incheon from 14 to 22 September, before stopping in Incheon to replenish fuel and ammunition. After four days, Badoeng Strait got underway again to take part in the operation into the Seoul area, which culminated in the liberation of the South Korean capital on 28 September. The ship then moved north to interdict North Korean supply lines for the next several days. On 2 October, the ship left the combat area to replenish at Sasebo, arriving two days thereafter. She remained there for two weeks to give her crew a rest from the near constant combat operations over the last two months.

Badoeng Strait next went to sea on 16 October, rendezvousing with Sicily in the Sea of Japan later that day. By that time, the UN offensive into North Korea was well underway, and the ships covered operations around Wonsan for the following eleven days. She assisted a marine unit south of Wonsan that came under attack on 28 October from a North Korean division that had been bypassed by the main UN offensive. The ship next provided aerial support to the US 7th Infantry Division as it advanced toward Kapsan and Pungsan near the Chinese border. The weather worsened into November, frequently preventing air operations, and on 14 November, Badoeng Strait departed for Sasebo, arriving two days later. The ship returned to the coast of Korea on 23 November, and on 25 November, her aircraft began heavy operations against Chinese troops that had intervened in the war. Her planes provided aerial support to the marines fighting at the Battle of Chosin Reservoir in late November and into December.

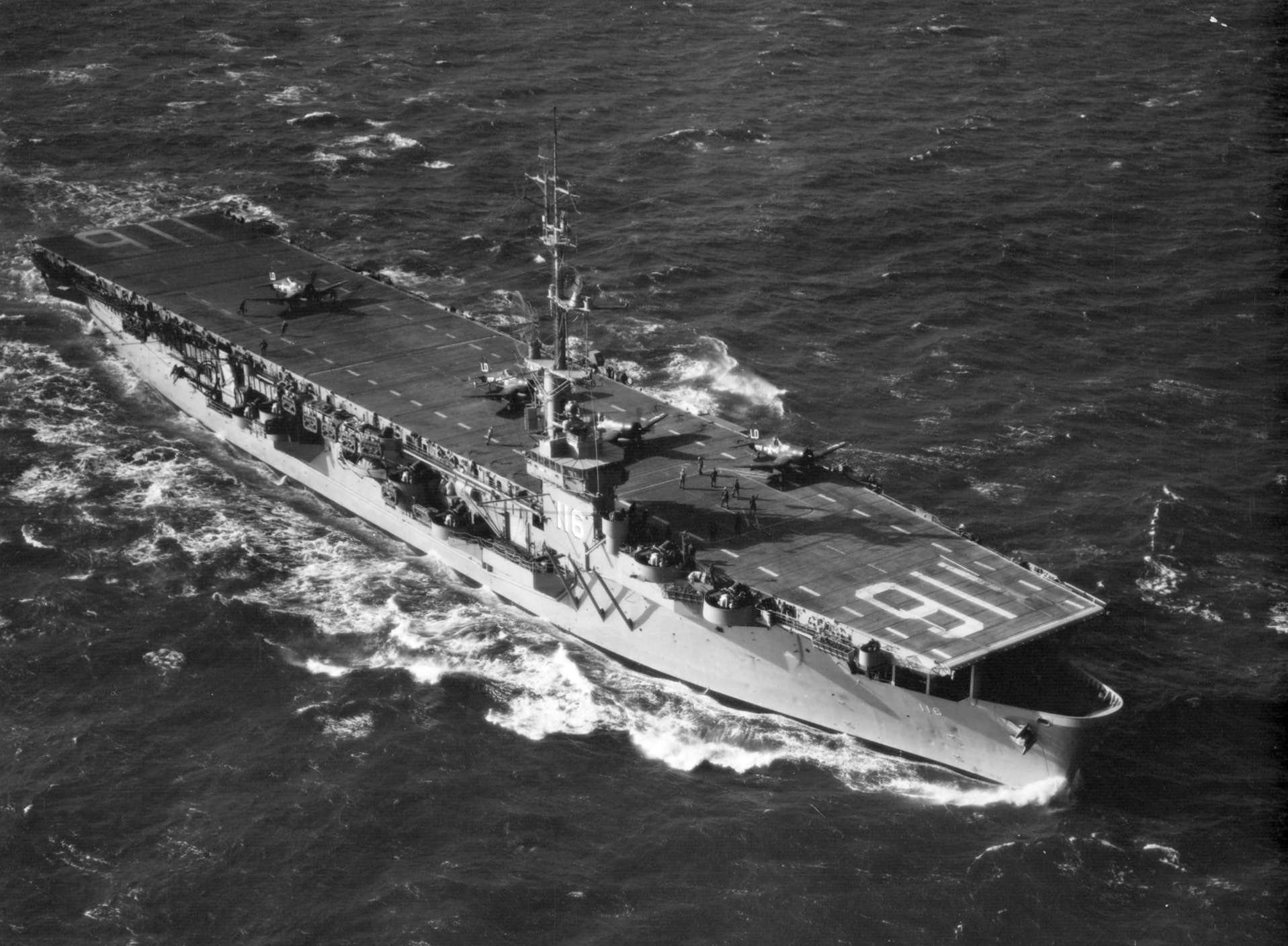
Badoeng Strait off the coast of Korea in 1952

The ship withdrew to the Sea of Japan on 10 December to replenish fuel, ammunition, and stores while underway. Three days later, she had returned to Wonsan to cover the Hungnam evacuation over the course of 15–24 December. The following day, she refueled at sea and then moved into the Yellow Sea by 27 December, where her aircraft operated over Seoul, which was also being evacuated by Allied forces in the face of Chinese advances. The ship operated in the area through 6 January 1951, when bad weather and the need to refuel and rearm led the ship to withdraw once again to Sasebo, arriving there on 9 January. She remained there until 29 January, when she departed to return to San Diego. After arriving there on 7 February, she moved north for an overhaul at Puget Sound that lasted until mid-July. The ship sailed back to San Diego on 20 July, where she carried out a month of flight training in preparation for another deployment to Korea.

Badoeng Strait got underway on 15 September, bound for Korean waters. She stopped briefly in Pearl Harbor on 21 September and then continued on to Yokosuka, arriving there on 2 October. There, she joined Carrier Division 17 and became its flagship. She spent the next two months participating in anti-submarine training exercises held off Okinawa with other elements of the 7th Fleet. In December, she returned to Korea to join a blockade of North Korean ports. Over the following days, her aircraft took part in a number of operations in western North Korea. She returned to Yokosuka on 28 December for replenishment and then carried out patrols in the Yellow Sea between 7 January 1952 and 6 February. The Australian carrier HMAS Sydney replaced her that month, allowing Badoeng Strait to return to San Diego. She stopped in Pearl Harbor on the way to drop off spare aircraft and other equipment, before proceeding on to San Diego, arriving there on 1 March.

The ship underwent periodic maintenance and then began a period of pilot training for Navy squadrons VS-23 and VS-871, followed by a Marine Corps helicopter unit in early June. She returned to San Diego on 11 June and thereafter made preparations for a third deployment to Korea. The ship got underway for East Asia on 19 July. She reached Japan by August, and while in Kobe on the 10th, she embarked planes from VS-931. Badoeng Strait then went to sea for anti-submarine training off Okinawa, and after a week there, joined the rest of 7th Fleet for operations off Japan that lasted through September. The ship finally sortied from Sasebo for combat operations on 5 October, though this time, her activities were limited to providing anti-submarine patrols for various naval units in the area off Wonsan. She returned to Sasebo on 17 October for maintenance that lasted until 28 October. The ship spent the next three months patrolling off the coast of Korea as part of the blockade force; she contributed her fighters for combat air patrols, to sweep for enemy forces, and to support Allied forces fighting ashore. During this period, she also took part in an officer exchange program with the British carrier HMS Glory. She arrived at Sasebo on 5 February 1953, unloaded equipment, and then proceeded to Yokosuka on 7 February, arriving two days later. On 11 February, she left for California, ending her operations in the Korean War. She earned six battle stars for her service during the conflict.

=== Later career ===
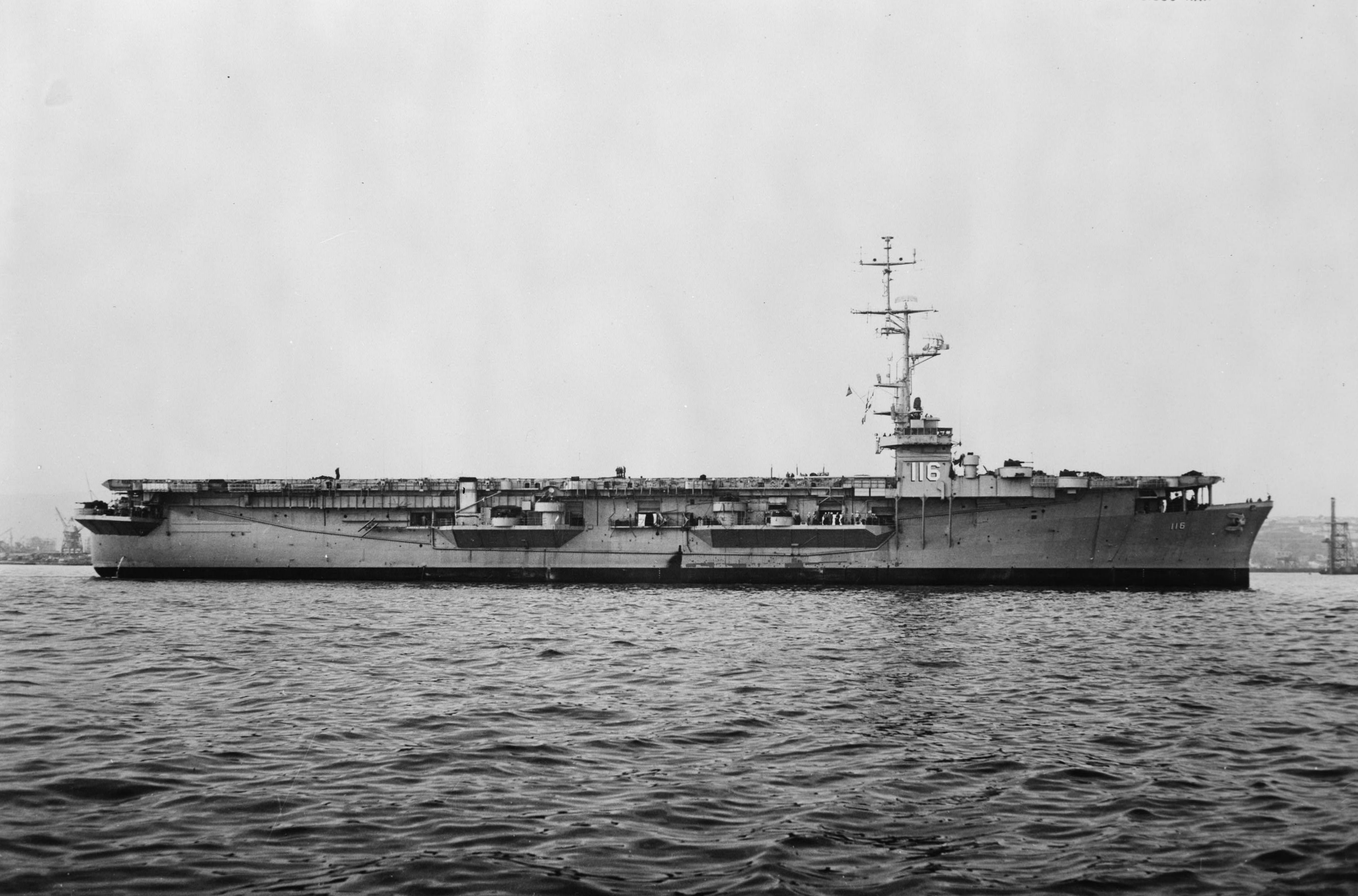
Badoeng Strait in the San Francisco Naval Shipyard in 1956

Badoeng Strait reached San Diego on 27 February; the following month, she moved to the San Francisco Naval Shipyard for an extensive overhaul and modernization that lasted for six months. She then returned to San Diego to be placed in limited commissioned, allocated to the reserve fleet there. She was placed in full commission again in February 1954. For the next year, she carried out anti-submarine training, including tests of the new Grumman S-2 Tracker anti-submarine aircraft and of helicopters in the anti-submarine role. The ship made another cruise to East Asia beginning in April 1955. She had aboard VS-38 and a helicopter detachment from HS-2. During the cruise, she visited Japan, patrolled off the coast of China, and took part in anti-submarine exercises with elements of 7th Fleet. She visited Taiwan and Okinawa in September before steaming back across the Pacific, arriving in San Diego on 1 October. From there, she moved back to San Francisco for another three months of mainentance.

The ship returned to San Diego in February 1956, and thereafter departed to join several ships in the Marshall Islands to participate in Operation Redwing, a series of nuclear weapons tests that involved seventeen separate detonations. These were carried out at Eniwetok and the Bikini Atoll. Badoeng Strait provided air transport from the fleet to Bikini, supported the Marine helicopter unit HMH-363, and served as a radiation safety checkpoint. Her crew also assisted with construction projects ashore. On 31 July, she got underway for San Diego, arriving on 8 August. Late the following month, she took part in extensive amphibious assault training, which lasted for fifteen weeks and included joint operations with Marine helicopters. The exercises also tested helicopter assaults and helped to develop air assault doctrine.

By the late 1950s, Badoeng Strait was worn out, and was too small to accommodate new jet aircraft and assault helicopters entering service. Because the Commencement Bay-class ships were not large enough to operate these new aircraft, the Navy had begun to replace them with the much larger Essex-class aircraft carriers by the mid-1950s. Proposals to radically rebuild the Commencement Bays either with an angled flight deck and various structural improvements or lengthen their hulls by 30 ft (9.1 m) and replace their propulsion machinery to increase speed came to nothing, as they were deemed to be too expensive. On 14 January 1957, she left San Diego for Bremerton, Washington, where she was prepared for long-term storage in the reserve. She was decommissioned on 17 May and assigned to the Pacific Reserve Fleet based in Bremerton. On 7 April 1959, she was reclassified as an aircraft ferry with the hull number AKV-17, but she saw no further active use. She was struck from the Naval Vessel Register on 1 December 1970, and on 8 May 1972, was sold to the ship breaking firm American Ship Dismantlers, based in Portland, Oregon. She was thereafter broken up for scrap.
