= Marine Aviation Training Support Group 33 =

Marine Aviation and Training Support Group 33
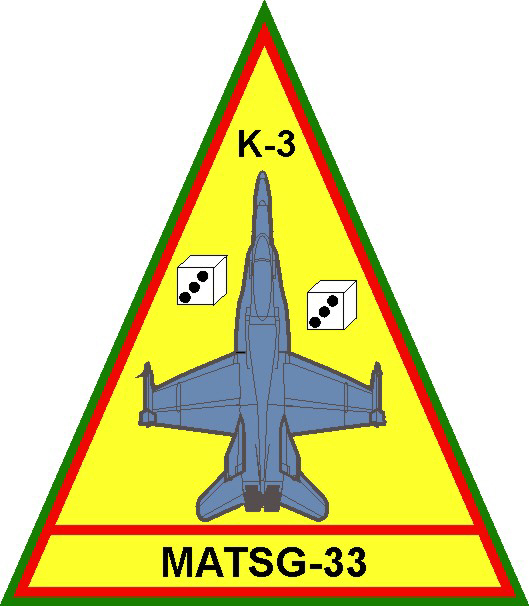
- MATSG-33 insignia
- Active: 1 February 1943 - 15 December 1970; 2000 – 22 June 2016
- Country: United States
- Allegiance: United States of America
- Branch: United States Marine Corps
- Role: Training
- Part of: TECOM
- Garrison/HQ: Naval Air Station Oceana
- Engagements: World War II * Battle of Okinawa; Korean War * Battle of Pusan Perimeter * Attack on the Sui-ho Dam

Commanders
- Current commander: Col Newell B. Day
- Notable commanders: Louis Robertshaw; John P. Condon

Marine Aviation and Training Support Group 33 (MATSG-33) was a United States Marine Corps aviation training group that was originally established during World War II as Marine Aircraft Group 33 (MAG-33). Fighter squadrons from MAG-33 fought most notably during the Battle of Okinawa and also as the first Marine aviation units to support the Korean War when they arrived as part of the 1st Provisional Marine Brigade. They helped stabilize the United Nations positions during the Battle of Pusan Perimeter and fought in Korea for the remainder of the war. At some point in the 1960s, the group was deactivated and was not reactivated until 2000, when Marine Aviation Training Support Group at Naval Air Station Oceana, Virginia was renamed MATSG-33. It was again deactivated on 22 June 2016.

== Mission ==
Provide administration and training support to all Marines aboard NAS Oceana. While the MATSG's mission was administrative in nature, the command monitored the flow of students through the Naval Air Training Command, provides Marine Corps discipline and Marine Corps peculiar training

== History ==
=== World War II ===
Marine Aircraft Group 33 (MAG-33) was commissioned on 1 February 1943 at Marine Corps Air Station Cherry Point, North Carolina. They moved to Marine Corps Auxiliary Field Bogue on 27 September 1943. On 6 April 1944, the group again transferred, this time to Marine Corps Air Station Eagle Mountain Lake, Texas where they spent the remainder of the summer training. In August, they moved on to Marine Corps Air Station Miramar, California to prepare for their deployment to the South Pacific.

In September 1944, MAG-33 left California for the Marshall Islands. They eventually settled in Espiritu Santo on 29 November 1944 after travelling through Pearl Harbor, Eniwetok, Peleliu, Ulithi and Manus Island. On 2 April 1945, the group arrived off Okinawa and eventually based out of, what is today, Kadena Air Base. They served throughout the Battle of Okinawa, providing close air support for the Marines and Soldiers on the ground. The group remained on Okinawa for the remainder of the war. Under the command of Col. Ward E. Dickey, MAG-33 set the record for most air-to-air kills on Okinawa at 214.

In January 1946, the group returned to the United States and was based out of Marine Corps Air Station El Toro.

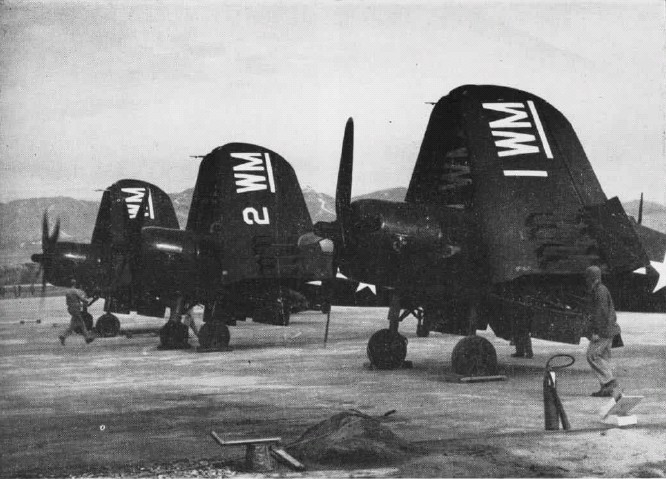
MAG-33 F4U-4s in 1948 during a maneuver at Camp Pendelton

=== Korean War ===
On 2 July 1950 the Joint Chiefs of Staff voted to commit the 1st Provisional Marine Brigade to combat in Korea. At the outbreak of the war, MAG-33 was part of the 1st Marine Aircraft Wing (1st MAW) and located at Marine Corps Air Station El Toro, California. The group was well below normal strength due to force cuts which came after World War II. Because it was a skeleton of itself, the majority of 1st MAW had to be stripped bare to reconstitute the MAG. Air group personnel and equipment boarded the transport USS General A. E. Anderson (AP-111) and the attack cargo ship USS Achernar (AKA-53) at Terminal Island; aircraft and aircrews were embarked on USS Badoeng Strait (CVE-116). On 14 July, exactly twelve days after the receipt of the warning order to deploy, MAG-33 set sail for Korea.

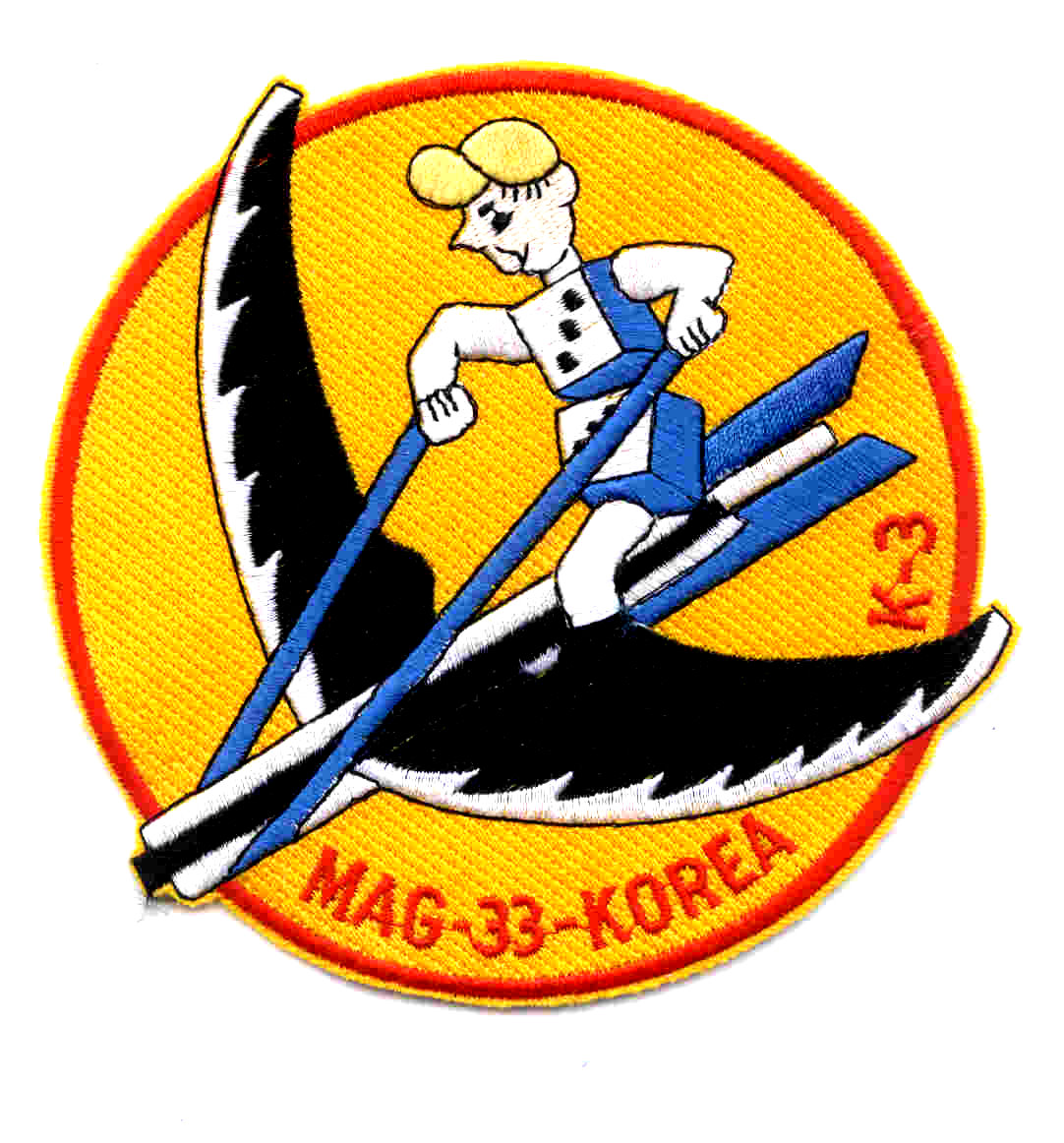
MAG-33 insignia used during the Korean War.

MAG-33 had offloaded in Kobe, Japan and were composed of the F4U Corsair squadrons of VMF-323 and VMF-214, the Flying Nightmares of VMF(N)-513 flying the night-fighting versions of the Corsair and the F7F Tigercat and VMO-6 with its eight OY-2 observation aircraft and four HO3S1 helicopters. VMF-323 stationed itself on board the USS Badoeng Strait (CVE-116), VMF-214 would fly off the USS Sicily (CVE-118), VMF(N)-513 would operate from Itazuke under Fifth Air Force control and VMO-6 would be based in Pusan. The first offensive action of the group came on 3 August when VMF-214 launched an eight plane strike package against the North Korean 6th Division in the vicinity of Jinju. MAG-33 would also deploy with the first helicopter ever to be employed by the United States in combat.

=== 2000 to present ===
Commencing in January 1982, Marine Corps officer and enlisted personnel were assigned to Light Attack Wing One (CLAW ONE). These Marines performed duties as members of the F/A-18 Hornet Fleet Introduction Team and were administratively joined on the rolls of Marine Barracks, Cecil Field. In 1984, approximately 195 Marines of all grades were assigned permanently to units at NAS Cecil Field. In subsequent years, this number increased due to the number of Marines temporarily undergoing instruction with VFA-106. During the Base Realignment and Closure (BRAC) board of 1993, it was determined that VFA-106, Naval Aviation Maintenance Group Detachment, and MATSG would be reassigned to Naval Air Station Oceana upon the closure of NAS Cecil Field.

On 4 May 2000, the Commanding General of Marine Corps Combat Development Command released a message redesignating all MATSGs to incorporate appropriate honors and history of Marine Aircraft Groups. Hence, MATSG, NAS Cecil Field, was redesignated as MATSG-33 upon the reassignment to NAS Oceana, taking on the history of MAG-33.

On 1 July 2006, the Commandant of the Marine Corps released a message realigning all MATSGs to fall under the Commanding General, Training Command, part of Training and Education Command.

On 22 June 2016, MATSG-33 conducted its deactivation ceremony aboard NAS Oceana.

== See also ==
- List of United States Marine Corps aircraft groups
- United States Marine Corps Aviation
