= VS-931 =

VS-931 Antisubmarine Squadron was activated at Willow Grove Naval Air Station in Pennsylvania on 1 March 1951 during the Korean War and was transferred to Los Alamitos Naval Air Station in California. The squadron was sent abroad on the USS Sicily and operated near Japan and Okinawa. Upon transferring to the USS Badoeng Strait, the Squadron went to Korea on two occasions to protect the US Naval fleet from enemy submarines. There were several transfers back and forth between the two ships and in addition the squadron was stationed on land bases at Atsugi and Itami for brief periods. The squadron returned to the States aboard the USS Sicily. Upon returning to Los Alamitos the squadron's designation was changed from VS-931 to VS-20.
