= Attack on the Sui-ho Dam =

US air-raid on hydro-electric dams during the Korean War

- Part of the bombing of North Korea
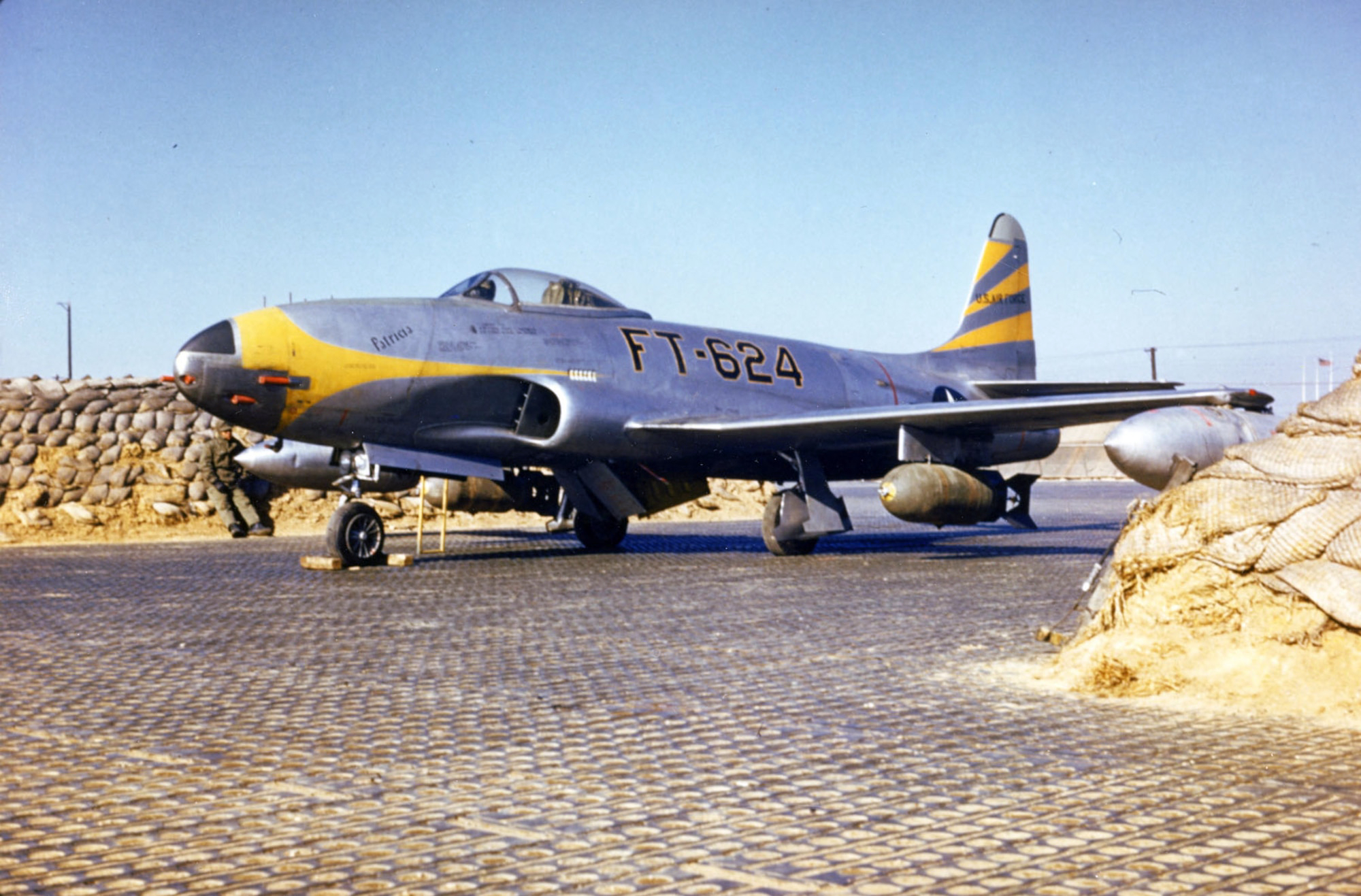
- F-80C fighter-bomber of the 8th FBG with wing-mounted bombs
Date	June 23–27, 1952
Location	Sui-Ho (Sup'ung-ho), Choshin Changjin, Fusen (Pujǒn), and Kyosen (P'ungsan), North Korea
Result	United Nations victory

Belligerents
United Nations: United States; South Africa	Soviet Union; China; North Korea

Commanders and leaders
(United States) Otto P. Weyland	(Soviet Union) Georgii A. Lobov

Strength
(United States) 670 USAF, USN, USMC fighter/fighter-bombers	(Soviet Union) 210 VVS MiG interceptors (China) (North Korea) 275 PLAAF/KPAAF (UAA) MiGs; 87 major AA guns

Casualties and losses
Five fighter/fighter-bombers lost or written off	Multiple MiGs shot down/destroyed Unknown number of AA guns destroyed/damaged Permanent destruction of 90% of generating capacity, power outage in North Korea for two weeks and reduction of available power to northeast China by 23%

The attack on the Sui-ho Dam was the collective name for a series of mass air attacks during the Korean War on thirteen hydroelectric generating facilities by United Nations Command air forces as part of the North Korean bombing campaign on June 23–24 and June 26–27, 1952. Primarily targeting the hydroelectric complex associated with the Sui-ho Dam in North Korea, the attacks were intended to apply political pressure at the stalled truce negotiations at Panmunjeom.

Heavily defended by Soviet, Chinese and North Korean Air Forces, as well as major anti-aircraft guns, the hydroelectric targets were subjected to attacks totaling 1,514 sorties. These were conducted jointly by fighters and fighter-bombers of the United States Air Force, US Navy, US Marine Corps, and South African Air Force, the first time in 21 months that the separate air arms had worked together on a massive scale. The attack on the facilities was followed seventeen days later by another series of large-scale joint attacks on the capital city of Pyongyang. (Note: On July 11, FEAF began a two-month politically motivated campaign, "Operation Pressure Pump," with 1,254 sorties against 30 targets at Pyongyang. In four attacks over a 24-hour period, with the Fleet Air Arm, Royal Australian Air Force, and the Republic of Korea Air Force also participating, 28 of the 30 targets were heavily damaged, with three completely destroyed, for a loss of three fighter-bombers and eight others receiving major damage. The mass attacks were repeated on August 29, with 1,403 sorties against 31 targets, establishing a single-day record, again with a loss of three fighter-bombers. (Futrell, USAF in Korea 1950-1953, p. 517 and 529))

The attacks destroyed 90% of the facilities targeted and completely knocked out power in North Korea for two weeks, as well as reducing available power to northeast China by 23%. North Korea built new facilities but did not restore its previous capacity until after the armistice in 1953. Politically, the attacks failed to sway the truce talks, as highly publicized repercussions in both the UK and the United States Congress undermined their impact.

Four attacks on a much more limited scale occurred between September 12, 1952, and June 7, 1953, causing only minor damage and little impact on the outcome of the truce talks. UN forces also exerted pressure on the North Korean infrastructure by attacking the smaller power-generating plants of the North Korean power grid during the summer of 1952 to prevent them from filling the void in power generation.

== Background and plans ==
=== North Korea's power systems ===
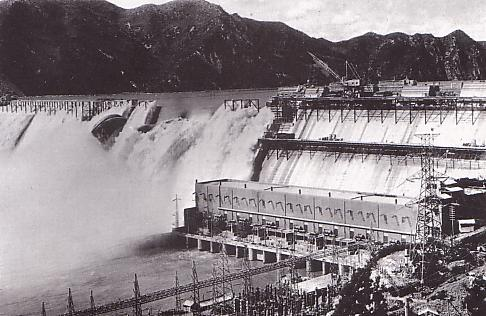
Sui-ho Dam under construction in July 1942

The Sui-ho Dam (now Supung Dam or sometimes Shuifeng Dam) on the Yalu River (40°28′N 124°58′E), at the time the fourth largest in the world, had been constructed in 1941 by Japan. The concrete dam was 853 m (2,799 ft) long, 97 m (318 ft) thick at the base, 18 m (59 ft) wide at the crest, and 160 m (520 ft) high. Its reservoir storage capacity was more than 20 billion cubic meters, and the Japanese had built six turbine generators each with a capacity of 100,000 kilowatts. The dam's generating facilities provided power for much of western North Korea and for the Port Arthur and Dairen regions of northeast China.

Three of the five other hydroelectric systems were located near each other in South Hamgyong Province north of Hungnam. Each consisted of four plants 8–16 km (5.0–9.9 mi) apart along a 50 km (31 mi) stretch of river, numbered by planners as 1 through 4, with plant 1 closest to its respective reservoir. The northernmost, the Kyosen (P'ungsan) system, was on the Namdae Ch'on with its terminus at Tanch'on. The Fusen (Pujǒn) system was due north of Hungnam on the Songch'on-gang, with its four plants close together but in mountain gorges. The Choshin (Changjin) ran south and then east in the mountain canyons from the Chosin Reservoir and connected with the Songch'on-gang south of Fusen Plant No. 4.

=== Planning history ===
North Korea had six hydroelectric systems and six small thermoelectric plants at the outbreak of the war, and all were on the list of strategically important targets compiled by the Joint Chiefs of Staff (JCS). B-29 Superfortresses of the United States Air Force had begun bombing industrial targets in North Korea soon after the invasion of the South in the summer of 1950 but had not attacked any part of the power transmission grid. As early as August 23, 1950, while UN forces were still struggling to hold the Pusan Perimeter and well before the UN landing at Inchon, planners of the USAF FEAF (Far East Air Forces) had asked if the hydroelectric system should be attacked; no decision had yet been made as to whether North Korea was to be occupied.

On September 21, 1950, FEAF attacked a plant of the Fusen system near Hungnam, completely destroying its transformers, and recommended that all the plants be destroyed. General Douglas MacArthur directed the attacks to proceed, but before that happened the JCS authorized MacArthur to enter North Korea and advised that targets of "long-term importance" including the hydroelectric plants should not be destroyed. A ban on bombing the Sui-ho (Sup'ung) Dam was put in place on November 6, 1950, at the direction of the U.S. State Department, to avoid providing a provocation for entry in the war by China. Even after China's massive intervention in the following month the ban was never rescinded, and it was reiterated by the UN Command when the truce talks began in July 1951.

On March 3, 1952, when the peace talks appeared to be near stalemate, FEAF commander, General Otto P. Weyland, recommended to UN commander General Matthew Ridgway that the hydroelectric plants be attacked to "create psychological and political effects to our advantage." Ridgway rejected the plan and also informed the JCS that he was unwilling to use force except as the last resort.

On April 28, President Harry Truman announced that Ridgway was being replaced as commander in Korea by General Mark Clark, and UN negotiators at Panmunjom made a compromise proposal on the stalemated issues. The next day the JCS asked Weyland to provide target information and recommendations in the event of complete stalemate, and he repeated his recommendation to bomb the hydroelectric plants. Ridgway objected to the JCS on May 1, stating that no attack should be made except on his recommendation, to which the JCS agreed. The next day the communists totally rejected the UN proposal, and while the talks continued, the UN took the stance that their position was irrevocable.

Clark took command on May 12, the first of a series of key changes in the military command in Korea. On May 19 Vice Admiral Joseph J. Clark became commander of the Seventh Fleet, on May 30 Lieutenant general Glenn O. Barcus took over the Fifth Air Force, and on June 4 Vice Admiral Robert P. Briscoe became commander of Naval Forces Far East. All brought a new aggressiveness to their commands and were desirous of attacking the hydroelectric plants. Briscoe made the recommendation to Clark on June 6, followed by Weyland the next day.

At Clark's direction, FEAF prepared two attack plans on the system, one of which included bombing the Sui-ho Dam while the other did not. The three systems in South Hamgyong were targeted, while two smaller systems—one near the border with the Soviet Union and the other immediately behind the battleline—were excluded. The plans, submitted to Clark on June 11, included both FEAF and Task Force 77 units, and Clark approved the lesser plan on June 17, naming Weyland as "coordinating agent". However, in reviewing the plans, the JCS recommended to Truman that the Sui-ho Dam also be attacked and he approved. The JCS authorized the attack on June 19, and the alternate plan was put into effect with a tentative date of June 23 or June 24, which would allow Briscoe to use four aircraft carriers in the operation. The operations plan was finalized when Clark proposed to Weyland that naval aircraft, originally slated only for the eastern complexes, be added to the attack on Sui-ho.

=== UN air order of battle, June 1952 ===
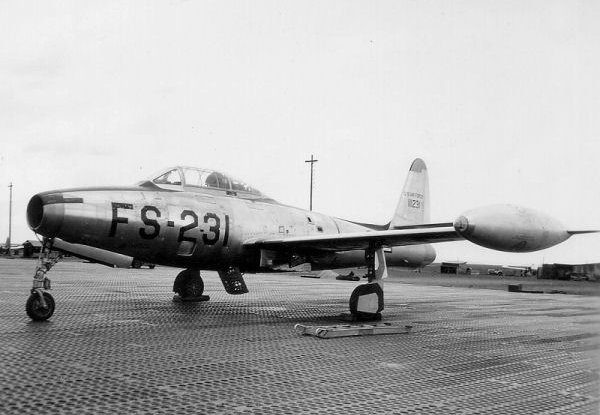
F-84G Thunderjet

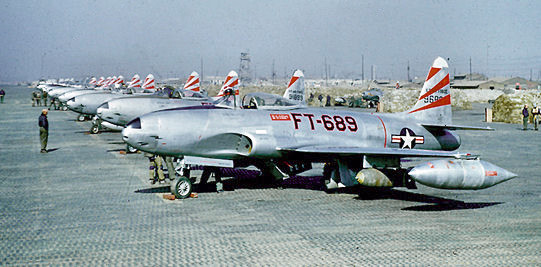
F-80C Shooting Stars of the 8th Fighter-Bomber Group

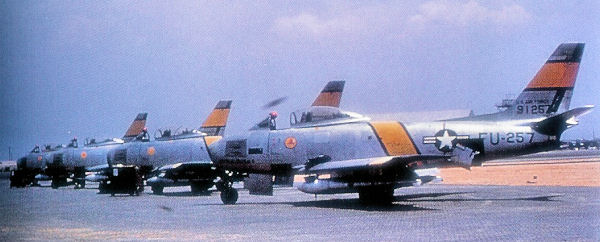
F-86 Sabres of the 4th Fighter-Interceptor Group

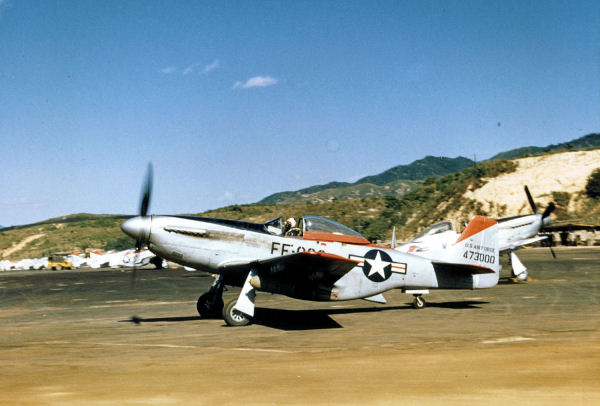
F-51K of 67th FBS, 18th FBG

The following air combat units were assigned to the attacks on the North Korean hydroelectric plants:

- Far East Air Forces – Lt. Gen. Otto P. Weyland
  - Fifth Air Force – Lt. Gen. Glenn O. Barcus
    - 4th Fighter-Interceptor Group – Col. Royal N. Baker
      - 334th FIS, 335th FIS, 336th FIS
    - 51st Fighter-Interceptor Group – Lt. Col. Albert S. Kelly
      - 16th FIS, 25th FIS, 39th FIS
    - 8th Fighter-Bomber Group – Col. Levi R. Chase
      - 35th FBS, 36th FBS, 80th FBS
    - 18th Fighter-Bomber Group – Col. Sheldon S. Brinson
      - 12th FBS, 67th FBS, 2 Sqd SAAF
    - 49th Fighter-Bomber Group – Lt. Col. Gordon F. Blood
      - 7th FBS, 8th FBS, 9th FBS
    - 136th Fighter-Bomber Group -Lt. Col. Donald F. Sharp
      - 111th FBS, 154th FBS, 182nd FBS
  - 1st Marine Aircraft Wing – Maj. Gen. Clayton C. Jerome
    - Marine Aircraft Group 12
      - VMA-121, VMA-212, VMA-323
    - Marine Aircraft Group 33
      - VMF-115, VMF-311
- Naval Forces Far East – Vice Adm. Robert P. Briscoe
  - Seventh Fleet – Vice Adm. Joseph J. Clark
    - Task Force 77 – Rear Adm. Apollo Soucek
      - Carrier Division One – Rear Adm. Herbert E. Regan
        - Carrier Air Group Seven, embarked on Bon Homme Richard – Cmdr. G. B. Brown
          - VF-71, VF-72, VF-74, VA-75
        - Carrier Air Group Eleven, embarked on Philippine Sea – Cmdr. J.W. Onstott
          - VF-112, VF-113, VF-114, VA-115
      - Carrier Division Three – Rear Adm. Soucek
        - Carrier Air Group Two, embarked on Boxer – Cmdr. A.L. Downing
          - VF-24, VF-63, VF-64, VA-65
        - Carrier Air Group Nineteen, embarked on Princeton – Cmdr. William Denton Jr.
          - VF-191, VF-192, VF-193, VA-195

=== Soviet air order of battle, June 1952 ===
The defending Soviet Air Forces (VVS) were represented on June 23, 1952, by the 64th Fighter Aviation Corps employing two of its three Soviet Air Defence Forces fighter aviation divisions (USAF wing-equivalent) on forward air bases of the Antung airfield complex in Northeast China, totaling six regiments with 246 MiG-15/MiG-15bis, of which 210 were rated combat-ready. (Note: The two forward-based PVO fighter aviation divisions opposing the Fifth Air Force had arrived on January 4, 1952 for a combat tour of duty that would last until August 10, 1952. A third fighter aviation division of four regiments, the 133rd IAD, had arrived in May 1952 and was in Corps Reserve in the Mukden area, although one of its regiments, the 485th IAP, had recently moved into a new airfield at Dapu near Antung and was available for combat as shown.) In addition, six full-strength fighter aviation divisions of the Unified Air Army (UAA), (Note: These were the 3rd, 4th, 12th, 15th, 17th, and 18th IAD of the Unified Air Army.) a joint command of the People's Liberation Army Air Force and Korean People's Army Air Force, were also combat operational in Northeast China with 275 MiG-15s.

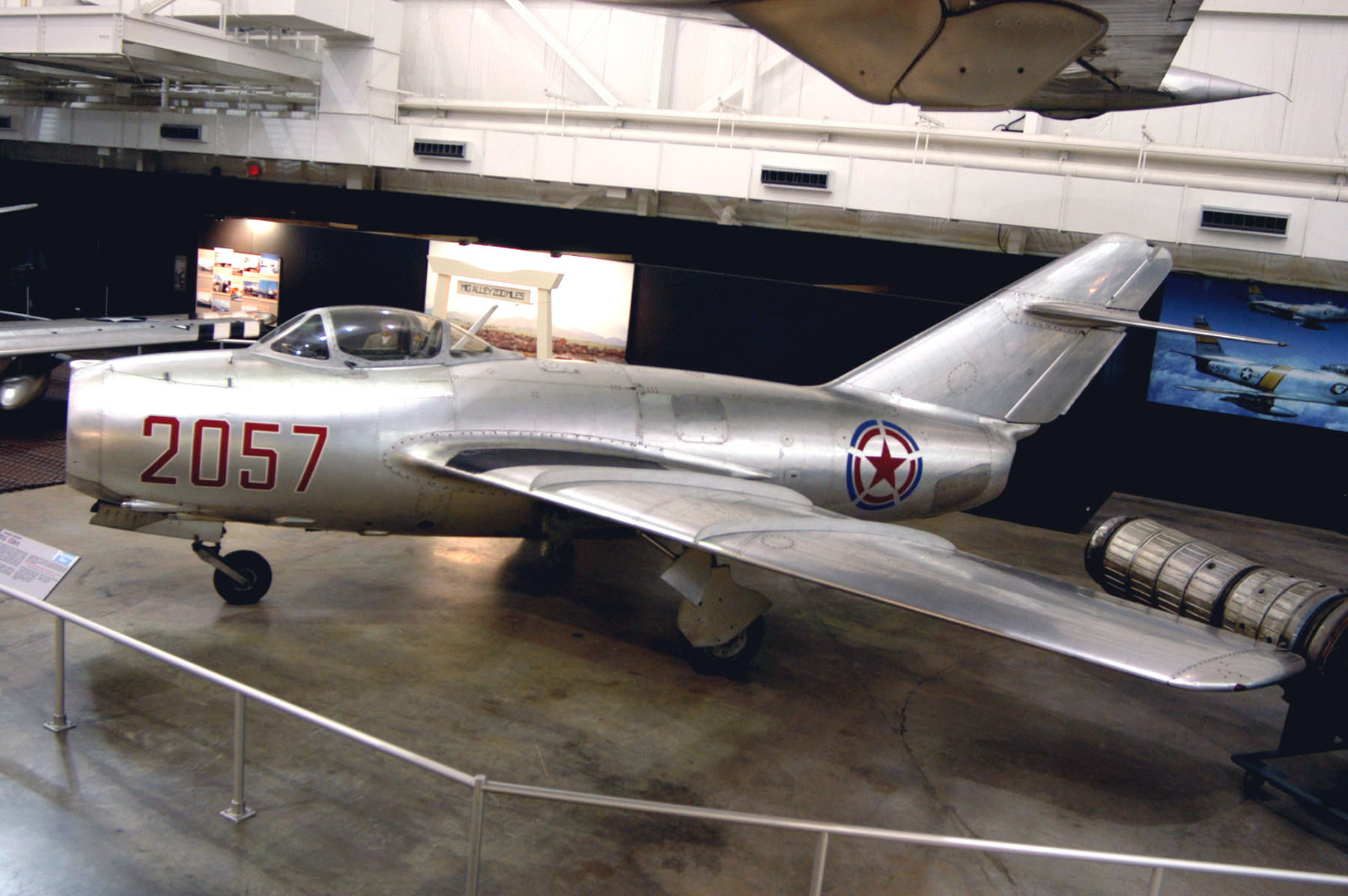
MiG-15bis on display at National Museum of the United States Air Force.

- 64th Fighter Aviation Corps – Major General Georgii A. Lobov
  - 97th Fighter Aviation Division PVO
    - 16th IAP (Fighter Aviation Regiment)
    - 148th GIAP (Guards Fighter Aviation Regiment)
  - 190th IAD (Fighter Aviation Division) PVO
    - 256th Fighter Aviation Regiment (256 IAP)
    - 494th IAP (Fighter Aviation Regiment)
    - 821st IAP (Fighter Aviation Regiment)
  - 351st NIAP (Night Fighter Aviation Regiment) VVS (Note: 351st NIAP was a "separate" nightfighter unit attached directly to 64th IAK and equipped with MiG-15 and Lavochkin La-11.)
  - 485th IAP (Fighter Aviation Regiment) (133rd IAD)

A third fighter division of the 64th IAK was based in the rear areas at Mukden and Anshan with four additional regiments. (Note: The Soviet rear area units were the 133rd IAD, 147th GIAP, 415th IAP, 726th IAP, and 578th IAP TOF (Tiho Okeanskogo Flota, i.e. "Pacific Ocean Fleet").) It was still in training and was not fully combat operational until July 12. The 37-mm guns of the PVO 87th ZAD (Antiaircraft Artillery Division) were responsible to provide local anti-aircraft artillery defense to Sui-ho, Choshin, Fusen and Kyosen.

== Air strikes June 1952 ==
=== Target assignments June 23–24 ===
Far East Air Forces hydroelectric targets
Unit	Base	Aircraft	Mission role	June 23 target	June 24 target
4th Fighter-Interceptor Group	K-14, Kimpo, South Korea	F-86E	MiG protection	Sui-ho Dam	Sui-ho Dam
51st Fighter-Interceptor Group	K-13, Suwon, South Korea	F-86E	MiG protection	Sui-ho Dam	Sui-ho Dam
8th Fighter-Bomber Group	K-13, Suwon, South Korea	F-80C	Strike	Sui-ho Dam	Sui-ho Dam
18th Fighter-Bomber Group	K-46, Hoengsong, South Korea	F-51K	Strike	Fusen No. 3 and 4	Choshin No. 1 and 2
49th Fighter-Bomber Group	K-2, Taegu, South Korea	F-84G	Strike	Sui-ho Dam	Sui-ho Dam
136th Fighter-Bomber Group	K-2, Taegu, South Korea	F-84G	Strike	Sui-ho Dam	Sui-ho Dam
Marine Aircraft Group 12	K-6, Pyongtaek, South Korea	F4U-4; AD-4	Strike	Choshin No. 4	
Marine Aircraft Group 33	K-3, Pohang, South Korea	F9F-2	Strike	Choshin No. 3	

Source: The United States Air Force in Korea, p. 487

Task Force 77 hydroelectric targets
Group	Squadron	Aircraft	Mission role	June 23 target	June 24 a.m. mission	June 24 p.m. mission
CVG-2	VF-63; VF-64	F4U-4	Strike	Kyosen No. 4	Kyosen No. 4	transformers
	VA-65	AD-4	Strike	Sui-ho Dam	Sui-ho Dam	transformers
	VF-24	F9F-2	flak suppression	Sui-ho Dam	Sui-ho Dam	
CVG-7	VF-71; VF-72	F9F-2	flak suppression/strike	Kyosen No. 2 & Fusen No. 2	MiG protection	
	VF-74	F4U-4	Strike	Kyosen No. 2 & Fusen No. 2	Kyosen No. 4	transformers
	VA-75	AD-4	Strike	Kyosen No. 2 & Fusen No. 2	Kyosen No. 4	transformers
CVG-11	VF-112; VF-113	F9F-2; F4U-4	Strike	Fusen No. 1	Kyosen No. 3	transformers
	VF-114	F9F-2	flak suppression	Sui-ho Dam	MiG protection	
	VA-115	AD-4	Strike	Sui-ho Dam	Kyosen No. 3	transformers
CVG-19	VF-192; VF-193	F4U-4	strike	Kyosen No. 3	Fusen No. 1, 2, & 3	Kyosen No. 3
	VF-191	F9F-2	flak suppression	Sui-ho Dam	Fusen No. 1, 2, & 3	
	VA-195	AD-4	Strike	Sui-ho Dam	Fusen No. 1, 2, & 3	Kyosen No. 3

Source: Carrier and Air Group Action Reports

=== First day missions ===
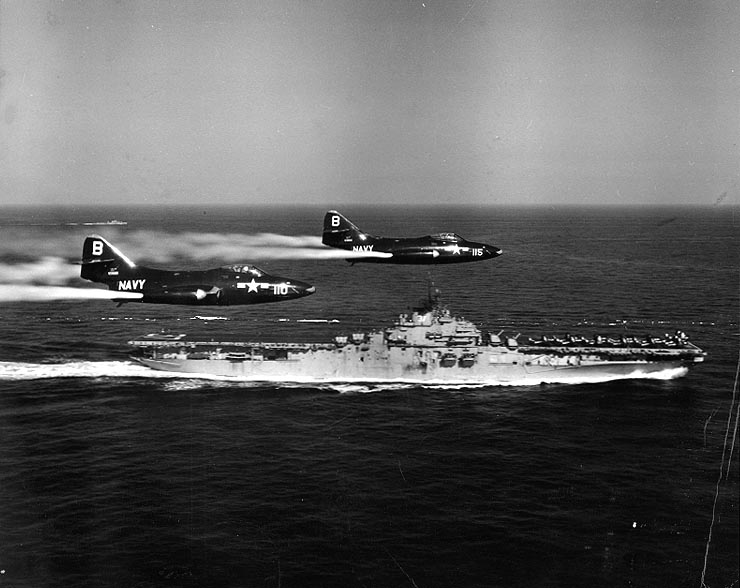
USS Princeton and F9F Panthers of VF-191

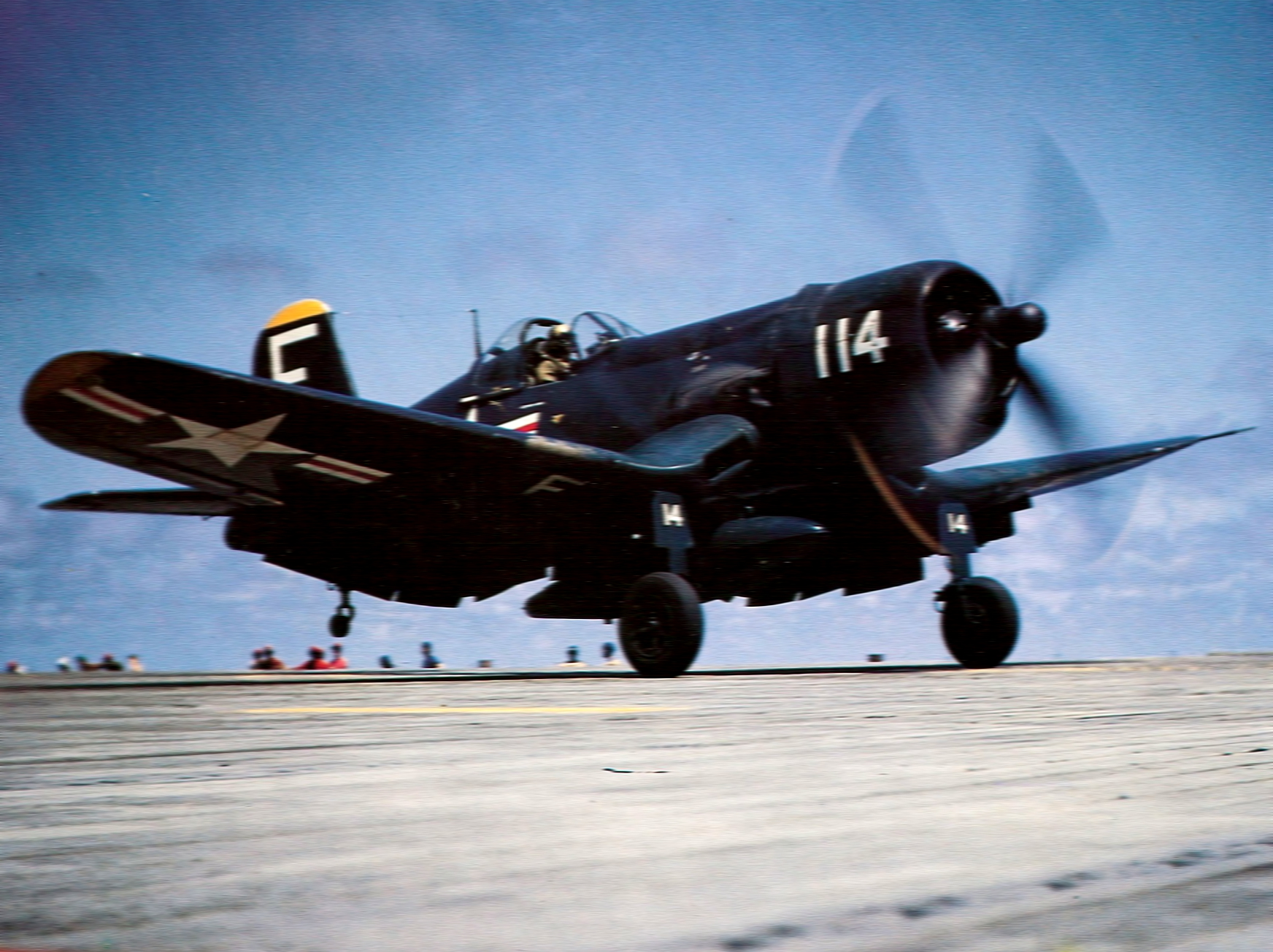
F4U-4 Corsair on the USS Boxer

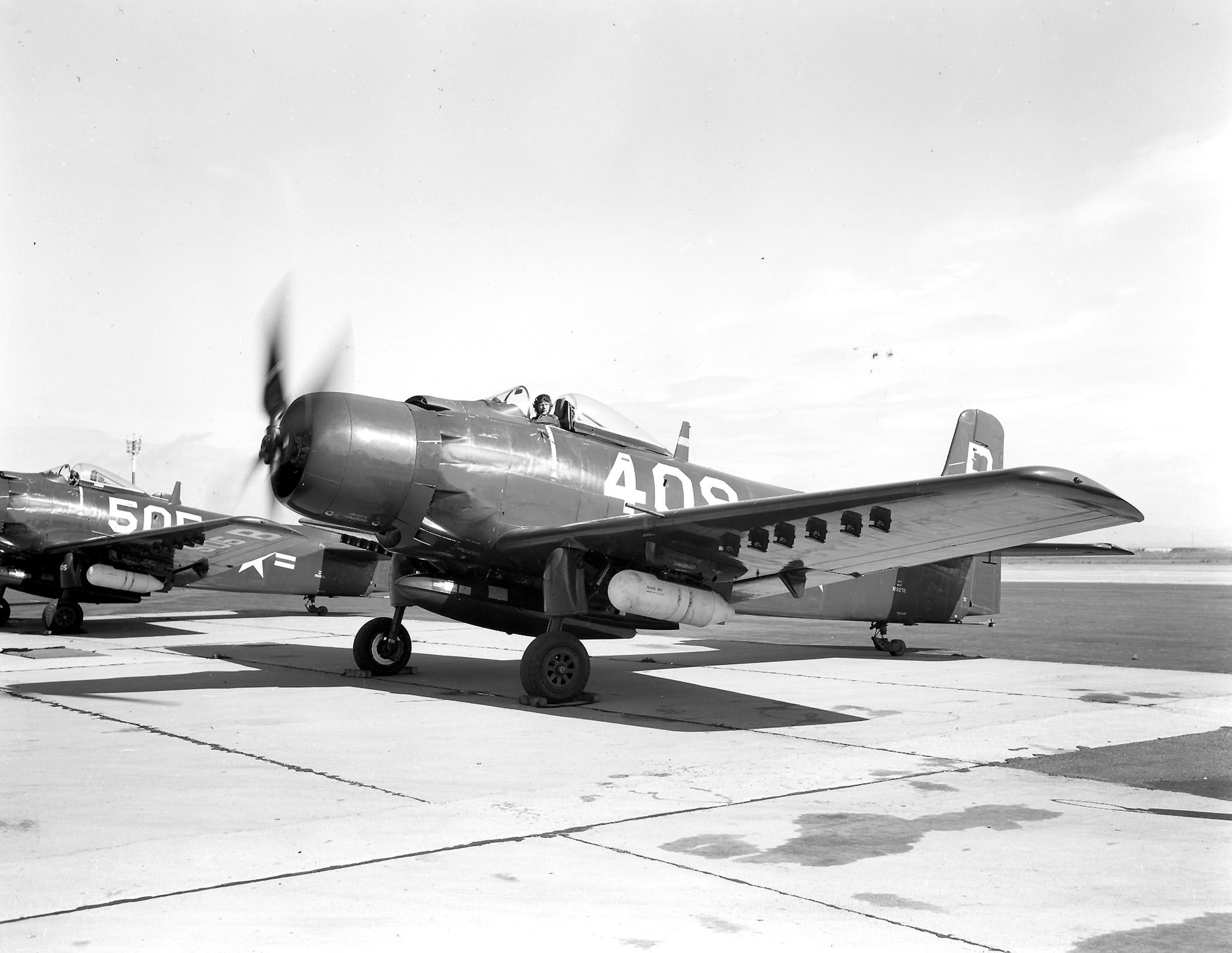
U.S. Navy AD Skyraider

Task Force 77 had four aircraft carriers available for the attacks. USS Philippine Sea was already on the line during the planning process, joined by USS Princeton on June 2 and USS Boxer on June 9. Rear Adm. Apollo Soucek was aboard Boxer and took operational command of Task Force 77. When Weyland approved Navy participation in the Sui-ho strike, USS Bon Homme Richard sailed from Yokosuka, Japan, on June 21 to provide the added force needed, arriving early on June 23.

The mission was to be launched at 08:00 June 23 (all times local time zone), with strikes beginning at 09:30 at all targets. However, weather reconnaissance aircraft reported unbroken clouds over the Yalu River, and Weyland postponed the attack at 07:40. As the morning passed, however, the weather system moved south, and Weyland immediately reversed himself and at 13:00 ordered the attacks to proceed, using the heavy clouds as concealment for the attackers en route to their targets, with a new attack time of 16:00.

Aircraft from all four U.N. services were a mixture of propeller-driven and jet aircraft, and in general the propeller aircraft launched up to an hour earlier than the jets to coordinate their arrival over the target together. The carriers launched their propeller aircraft at 14:00 and their jets at 15:00. Air Force fighter-bombers, having the longest distance to fly, took off at 14:30. Because the Sui-ho Dam was located less than forty miles (64 km) from the MiG-15 fighter base complex at Antung/Tai Ton Chao/Phen Chen in China, where 150 MiGs had been counted by the weather reconnaissance, a coordinated simultaneous arrival over the targets was crucial to limiting the effectiveness of any defensive reaction.

The carrier aircraft of TF77 crossed the Korean coast at Mayang-do northeast of Hungnam and flew low over the mountains at 5,000 feet (1,500 m) to mask their radar signature. The propeller and jet divisions rendezvoused approximately 50 miles (80 km) east of Suiho shortly before 16:00 and climbed to the attack altitude of 10,000 feet (3,000 m) for a high-speed run-in.

Eighty-four F-86 Sabres of the 4th and 51st Fighter-Interceptor Groups were the first to arrive in the Sui-ho target area, tasked to provide cover against MiG attack and, according to one participant, to prevent MiGs from taking off by overflying their bases at low altitude, even though officially UN aircraft were not allowed to cross the Yalu except in hot pursuit. According to US sources, 160 MiGs took off before the arrival of the covering force but flew deeper into China, possibly fearing that their airfields were the targets, and none attempted to intercept the strike force.

Incursions into Manchuria by pilots of the 51st FIG to surprise MiGs over their own airfields had resulted in heavy losses for the 64th IAK during the previous months, with at least half of the MiGs destroyed in April and May 1952 shot down during take-offs or landings. (Note: The "sanctuary attacks" were allegedly conducted under an unofficial policy nicknamed Maple Special to establish contrived conditions for hot pursuit. (Dorr, Lake, and Thompson, p. 41)) The Soviets developed a counter-tactic to cover takeoffs from Antung with combat air patrols launched from Mukden and Anshan, but on June 23, despite good weather over Antung, inclement conditions at Mukden prevented covering MiGs from taking off. In turn, this kept Soviet fighters based at Antung from countering the strike, to avoid pointless losses during takeoffs.

At 16:00, 35 Navy F9F Panthers began runs to suppress the anti-aircraft fire from 44 heavy caliber gun and 37 automatic weapons emplacements reported around the dam. Twelve AD Skyraiders of VA-65 off Boxer then began their dive-bombing runs on the Sui-ho generating stations, followed by 23 Skyraiders off Princeton and Philippine Sea, releasing 81 tons of bombs in little more than two minutes.

Between 16:10 and 17:00, USAF jets added 145 tons of bombs on the Sui-ho generating plant with 79 sorties by F-84 Thunderjets of the 49th and 136th Fighter-Bomber Groups and 45 by F-80 Shooting Stars of the 8th Fighter-Bomber Group (8th Fighter-Bomber Wing).

At almost the same time, 52 F-51 Mustangs of the 18th Fighter-Bomber Group and the South African 2 Squadron struck Fusen plants 3 and 4, west of Hungnam, while 40 Marine Skyraiders and F4U Corsairs of MAG-12 bombed Choshin No. 4, and 38 Panthers of MAG-33 hit Choshin No. 3. The lower Fusen plants and the Kyosen complex were bombed by 102 Corsairs, 18 Skyraiders and 18 Panthers off the carriers. In all on June 23, Task Force 77 flew 208 strike sorties and FEAF 202. (Note: Field claims 230 sorties, but the figure "208" is specifically cited in the action report of Boxer, CTF-77's flagship.) At 19:00, two RF-80 photo-recon aircraft of the 67th Reconnaissance Group, escorted by six flights of F-86s, returned to Sui-ho, while Marine F2H-2P Banshee photo-recon planes of VMJ-1 and Navy F9F-2P Panthers of VC-61 overflew the eastern systems to assess damage.

Two F-80s of the 8th FBW were battle-damaged by flak over Sui-ho, and written off after crash landings at Taegu. An F4U flown by the squadron commander of VF-63 (from Boxer) was heavily damaged over Kyosen No. 4 and made a water-landing in which the pilot was rescued, the only naval plane lost. A VA-115 Skyraider (from Philippine Sea) had its hydraulic system damaged by flak over Sui-ho and diverted to K-14 airfield in South Korea, for a wheels-up landing, and another from VA-75 was severely damaged when it was struck by debris from a bomb explosion but recovered aboard Bon Homme Richard. The only other battle damage reported by the attacking units was by Carrier Air Group 11 off Philippine Sea: a Corsair hit in an accessory compartment over Kyosen No. 3, and a Skyraider at Sui-ho struck by small arms fire.

=== Subsequent missions and damage results ===
Although interpretation of reconnaissance photos and assessments by returning pilots indicated heavy damage to the Sui-ho, Choshin, Fusen and Kyosen No. 1 and 2 plants, most of the targets were re-struck the next day, June 24, in both morning and afternoon missions.

In the morning missions, Air Force F-84s and Navy Skyraiders attacked Sui-ho, judging it totally destroyed, with one Skyraider suffering minor damage. Princeton aircraft bombed Fusen, Mustangs of the 18th FBG hit the unscathed Choshin plants 1 and 2, and planes off Boxer and Philippine Sea struck the remainder of the Kyosen plants.

In the afternoon Princeton completed the destruction of Kyosen No. 3, but incurred the loss of a Corsair of VF-192 in the process, although the pilot was rescued at sea by a helicopter from USS Helena. An F-86E of the 335th FIS was written off after its return to K-14, the result of damage by a MiG attack. Aircraft from the other three carriers struck transformer stations along the power grid at Chungdae-ri, Naemǒkpang, and Man'gyo-ri, in the vicinity of Kojǒ (Kangwon Province), and at Yuchǒn, Haeju, Chaeryong, Kaishu, and Chang-yôn in North Hwanghae Province.

Attacks by B-29 Superfortresses scheduled against Choshin No. 1 and 2 for the night of June 24–25, on the second anniversary of the start of the war, were cancelled after the targets were struck by F-51s during the day, but 25 bombers already prepared for the mission were re-targeted to radar-directed close support sorties along the front lines. (Note: The USAF official history notes that the targets had been "reserved" for attack by the B-29s but that the Mustangs had over-zealously struck them.) After a pause on June 25, Choshin and Fusen were re-attacked by smaller numbers of Air Force fighters on June 26–27 to complete the hydroelectric attacks. Total bombing sorties during the four-day effort were 730 by land-based fighter-bombers and 546 by carrier aircraft. F-86 Sabres flew an additional 238 counter-air sorties to protect the force from MiGs. UN losses were five aircraft: two Navy Corsairs crashed at sea and three Air Force jets written off at their home bases. All of the pilots were rescued.

Approximately 90% of North Korea's power-production capacity was destroyed in the attacks, with 11 of the 13 generating plants put totally out of operation and the remaining two doubtful of operating. China suffered an estimated loss of 23% of its electric requirements for northeast China, and other intelligence estimates stated that industrial output in 60% of its key industries in the Dairen region failed to meet production quotas. For two weeks North Korea endured a total power blackout.

Both China and the Soviet Union immediately sent technicians into North Korea to repair or re-build lost generators. For much of the summer of 1952 only approximately 10% of former energy production was restored, primarily by its thermoelectric plants.

== Political effects of June attacks ==
Any effect the attacks had on the communist hierarchy's representatives at the truce talks was immediately negated by reaction of the Labour Party leaders Clement Attlee and Aneurin Bevan who criticized the operation as risking World War III, even though there were no allegations of territorial violations or objections that the plants were non-military targets.

The Labour Party saw an opportunity to cripple the ruling Conservatives and called for a vote in the House of Commons to censure the Churchill government, based on the British government's "failure to secure effective consultation" from the U.S. beforehand (The Minister of Defence, Lord Harold Alexander, had been in Korea when Clark first approved the FEAF plan, but had left Korea before the JCS input). The government barely survived the vote after U.S. Secretary of State Dean Acheson publicly took the blame, stating the U.S. was at fault for not consulting the British "as a courtesy", although the price for this stance was undercutting Clark and the Panmunjom negotiators. Naval historian James Field commented that cooperation between the services was much smoother than between the allies.

While conferring with Alexander, Clark had already agreed in principle to British requests for a representative of the UN staff, and Churchill's designate was appointed as a deputy chief of staff on July 31, 1952.

The other factor crippling the political effect of the strikes occurred in the United States and was the opposite of that in Britain. Critics of the Truman administration in Congress quickly seized on the military success of the strikes to question why the attacks had taken almost two years to be approved. General Clark, who agreed, so advised the JCS. Secretary of Defense Robert A. Lovett, to whom the inquiries were made, cited seven factors, but some were long obsolete by the time of the attacks and others clearly badly estimated.

Despite the lack of political effect on the truce talks, and the widely publicized negative reactions on both sides, the campaign against the hydroelectric system and its destruction became an acceptable objective of UN forces.

== Follow-up attacks ==
=== Summer 1952 power grid campaign ===
Within ten days of the strikes, UN air forces resumed attacks to keep the power grid out of service, although the Sui-ho Dam and its environs were not among the targets. (Note: Soviet records described a strike on the Sup'ung (Sui-ho) Dam on July 4, claiming that despite severe air-to-air losses among their MiGs, they successfully repulsed an attempt to destroy the dam. (Seidov and Britton, pp. 390–391) However USAF records indicate that the target on July 4 was the North Korean Military Academy at Sakchu, in the same general vicinity, and UN air attacks did not target the dams themselves but their operating facilities. (Futrell, USAF Operations in the Korean Conflict, p. 513))

Task Force 77 renewed its strikes on July 3 with attacks by Navy aircraft from the carriers Philippine Sea, Bon Homme Richard, and Boxer. Both Kyosen power plants were targeted, as were three power plants at Puryŏng-ŭp (Funei). The latter, previously unstruck, had been scheduled to be bombed on June 29 but the mission had been cancelled because of fog in the target area. Bon Homme Richard's Air Group Seven further damaged Kyosen No.1, but smoke obscured Kyosen No.2, and it was restruck on July 8, destroying its powerhouse and penstocks (piping that delivers water to the turbines). USAF F-84s of the 49th FBW attacked the Choshin plants on July 8, striking the generators, transformer yards, and penstocks in 41 sorties.

On July 19, Air Group Seven's aircraft bombed Choshin No. 3, scoring five hits on its transformer yard, while Air Group Nineteen aboard Princeton bombed Choshin No. 1, and again on July 20, noting a significant increase in AAA defenses. On July 23, the thermo-electric plant at Wonsan was attacked for the first time, by aircraft from Bon Homme Richard, which reported it completely destroyed. On the nights of July 19–20, and July 21–22, 44 B-29 sorties were flown against Choshin No. 2.

Air Group Seven attacked Puryŏng-ŭp No. 3 on July 26, the Kojǒ No. 3 transformer yard on July 31, Choshin No. 1 on August 1, Kyosen No. 2 on August 3, and Kyosen No. 1 on September 21. A newly activated air group, Air Task Group Two (ATG-2), aboard USS Essex, also attacked Kyosen No. 2 on August 3, then struck Choshin No. 1 and Kyosen No. 1 on August 5. In the fifteen attacks by the Navy, no carrier aircraft were lost. Further B-29 sorties were directed against Choshin No.1, sixteen on the night of August 29, and fifty on the night of September 1.

=== September 1952 ===
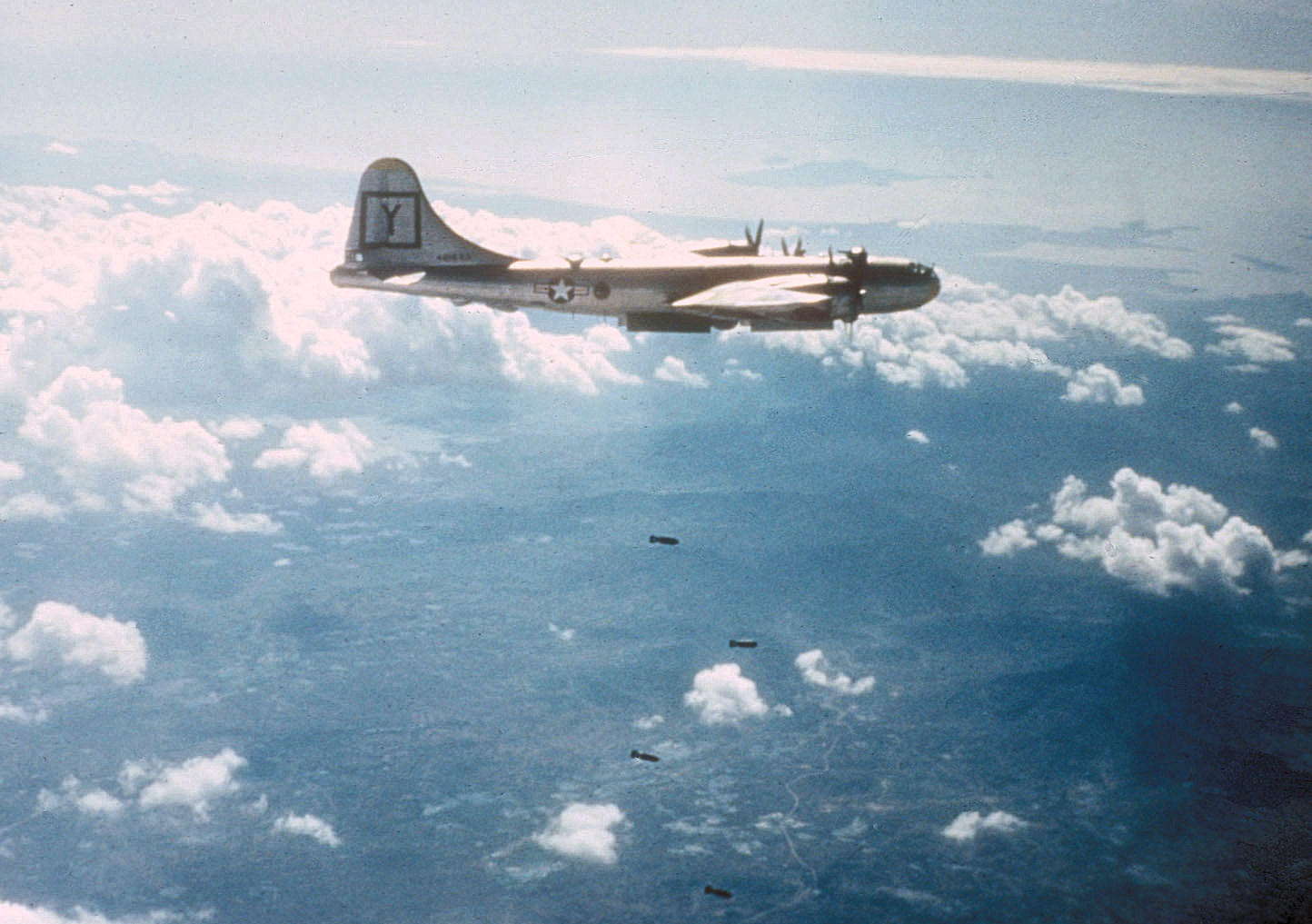
307th Bomb Group B-29 bombing a target in Korea.

The United Nations again attacked the Sui-ho hydroelectric complex on the night of September 12–13, 1952, employing a strike force consisting of flak/searchlight suppression flights of B-26 Invaders and naval aircraft of USS Princeton, an electronic counter-measures flight of four specially modified B-29 Superfortresses to jam Soviet AAA radars and communications, and a bombing force of 25 B-29s of the 19th and 307th Bomb Groups using SHORAN navigation aids to locate the target.

After the take off from Kadena Air Base, Okinawa, at 19:00 on September 12, the bomber force suffered its first setback when an unexpected cold front over Korea caused icing in the upper surfaces of wings and fuselage of some B-29s. A 19th Bomb Group bomber stalled and crashed 21 miles (34 km) southwest of Kangnung, killing all but one of its crew. The flak suppression forces were able to locate and attack only eight searchlights, and flak shot down an F4U of VF-193.

The B-29 force arrived at Sui-ho at 23:55, but in spite of the jamming by the ECM aircraft encountered a dense flak barrage. A B-29 of the 307th BG was shot down, either by a MiG-15 as claimed by the Soviets or by AAA as reported by a surviving crew member, (Note: A gunner aboard the B-29 immediately behind the destroyed bomber, A2C Francis "Bud" Farrell, witnessed the destruction and sharply disputes the Soviet claim as false. He and the surviving gunner, A1C Fred Parker, both assert that the B-29 was hit by flak in its bomb bay, detonating the bombs. (Farrell, "No Sweat", pp. 163–164)) and another of the 19th BG was damaged. Two others were hit by flak, making emergency landings at Taegu AB, South Korea. The intensity of AAA fire and MiG attacks dispersed the bomber formation with a consequential loss of accuracy. (Note: The defenders' task was greatly simplified by UN rules of engagement that required bomb runs be made parallel to the border to prevent any accidental incursion into Manchuria. Consequently all B-29 attacks had to be made east-to-west along the Yalu to limit the time of exposure to communist defenses.) The Soviet after-action report stated:

Up to 500 bombs weighting 250/450/1000 kgs were dropped on the target. Three bombs hit the upper part of the dam, one hit the part of the turbine room which had been already destroyed, and up to 50 hit the previously destroyed transformer facility. The remaining bombs missed the target by 1–2 km to the southeast. In addition to high-explosive bombs, the enemy used incendiary and napalm bombs. The dam, the working turbines, the generators and the transformers were not damaged. The shock waves destroyed a high-voltage overhead cable and six peasant huts. The warehouse storing the POW’s food burned down. One local man was killed and two were wounded.

Despite initial USAF estimates claiming five hits on the main powerhouse and three on the transformer yards, photo reconnaissance on October 12 reported that the complex was still in limited operation, indicated by the flow of tailrace water from two turbines.

=== February 15, 1953 ===
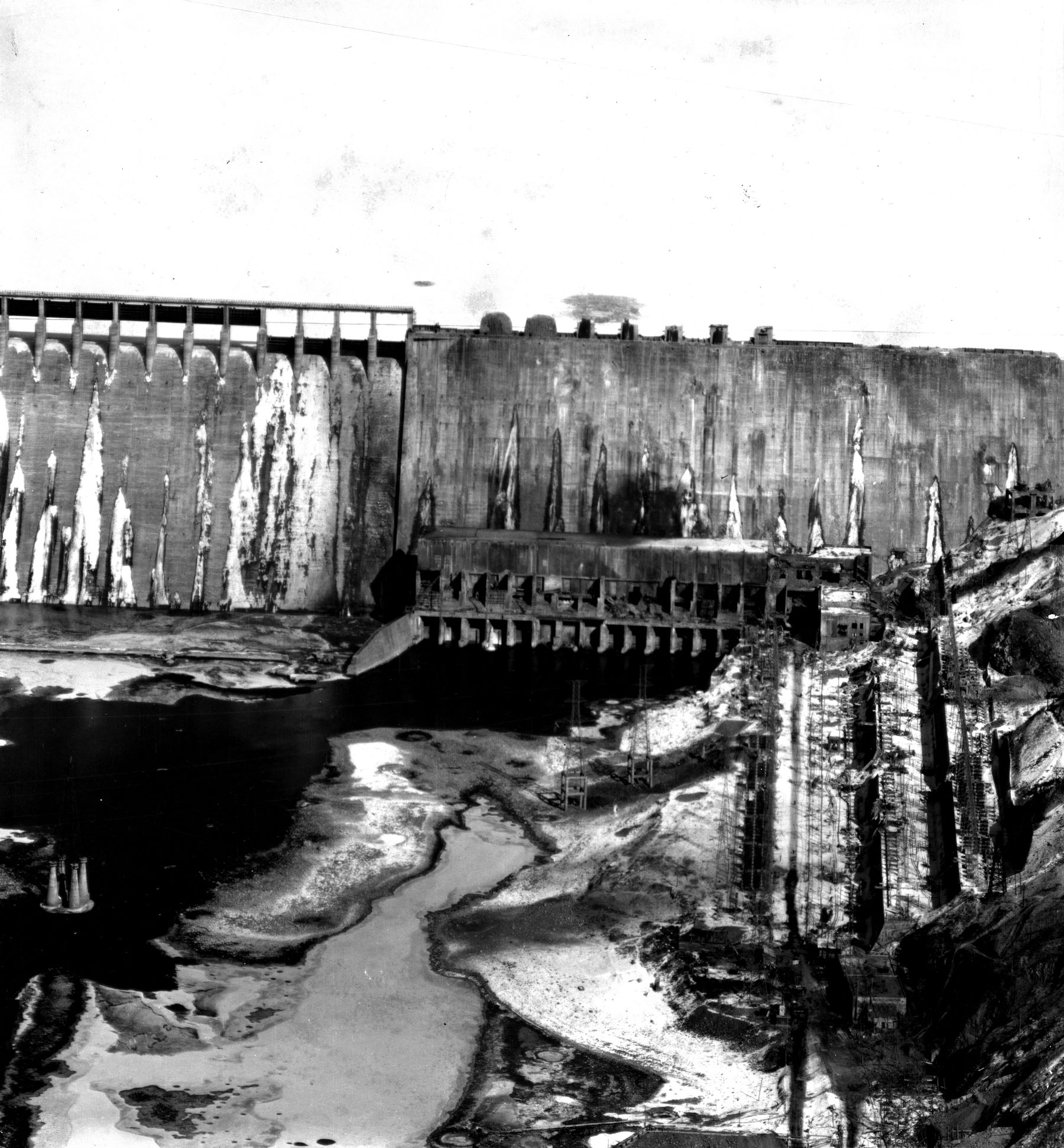
Sui-ho Dam, 22 February 1953

Reconnaissance photographs of tailrace activity continued to indicate that two generators of the Sui-ho hydroelectric complex remained in operation. A low-level attack by 24 F-84s of the 49th FBG on February 15, 1953, carrying two 1000-pound bombs each and escorted by 82 F-86s, struck the complex without loss. However, the escorts were attacked by 30 MiG-15s, and in the ensuing combat the Soviet 913th IAP (32nd IAD) claimed two F-86s shot down, for the loss of one MiG. Escorting F-86s, however, claimed four MiGs shot down and reported no losses.

=== May 10, 1953 ===
Eight F-84s of the 474th FBG attacked Sui-ho again on May 10 without loss, placing three delayed-action bombs in the power house. In air combat among the escorts and interceptors, the Chinese People's Liberation Army Air Force claimed an F-86 shot down, with its own MiG-15 pilot subsequently shot down and killed. However, 4th FIW pilots claimed two MiGs shot down with no losses that date. (Note: The F-86 shown as written off on 10 May 1953 was reported by USAF as a loss due to accident.)

=== June 7, 1953 ===
The final attack of the Korean War on the Sui-ho hydroelectric complex was made on June 7, 1953. A force of eight F-86F fighter-bombers from the 8th FBG, in "integral flight formation" with twelve of the 51st FIG to disguise its mission, flew as part of the Yalu River patrol, escorted by 66 other F-86s. The fighter-bomber formation reached the Sui-ho Reservoir, a common F-86 checkpoint, then rolled into its bomb run, surprising the defenders. Although several hits were reported, tailrace activity several days later indicated two generators were probably operating, and further attacks were discontinued for lack of intelligence of their location within the vast powerhouse.

A private source alleges that in connection with this mission, F-86s of the 4th FIG entered deep into Manchuria to ambush the Soviet MiGs while they were taking off, shooting down two MiGs of the 535th IAP (32nd IAD), and that part of the 535th IAP evaded the blockading Sabres to engage the escort, damaging an F-86E of the 51st FIG beyond economic repair. The 781st IAP (TOF, 165th IAD) claimed an F-86F of the 67th FBS as destroyed when it was written off after return to base. USAF records, however, claim that the aircraft was a total loss after a tire failed during landing, and that its fighters shot down five MiGs.

The purpose of the strikes was to remind the communists that the UN intended to make continuation of the war as expensive as possible for them. Sui-ho's No. 6 and 7 generators, and that of Choshin No. 1, were back in operation at the time of the armistice.

== Notes ==
Footnotes

Citations
