= USS Sicily =

Commencement Bay-class escort carrier of the US Navy

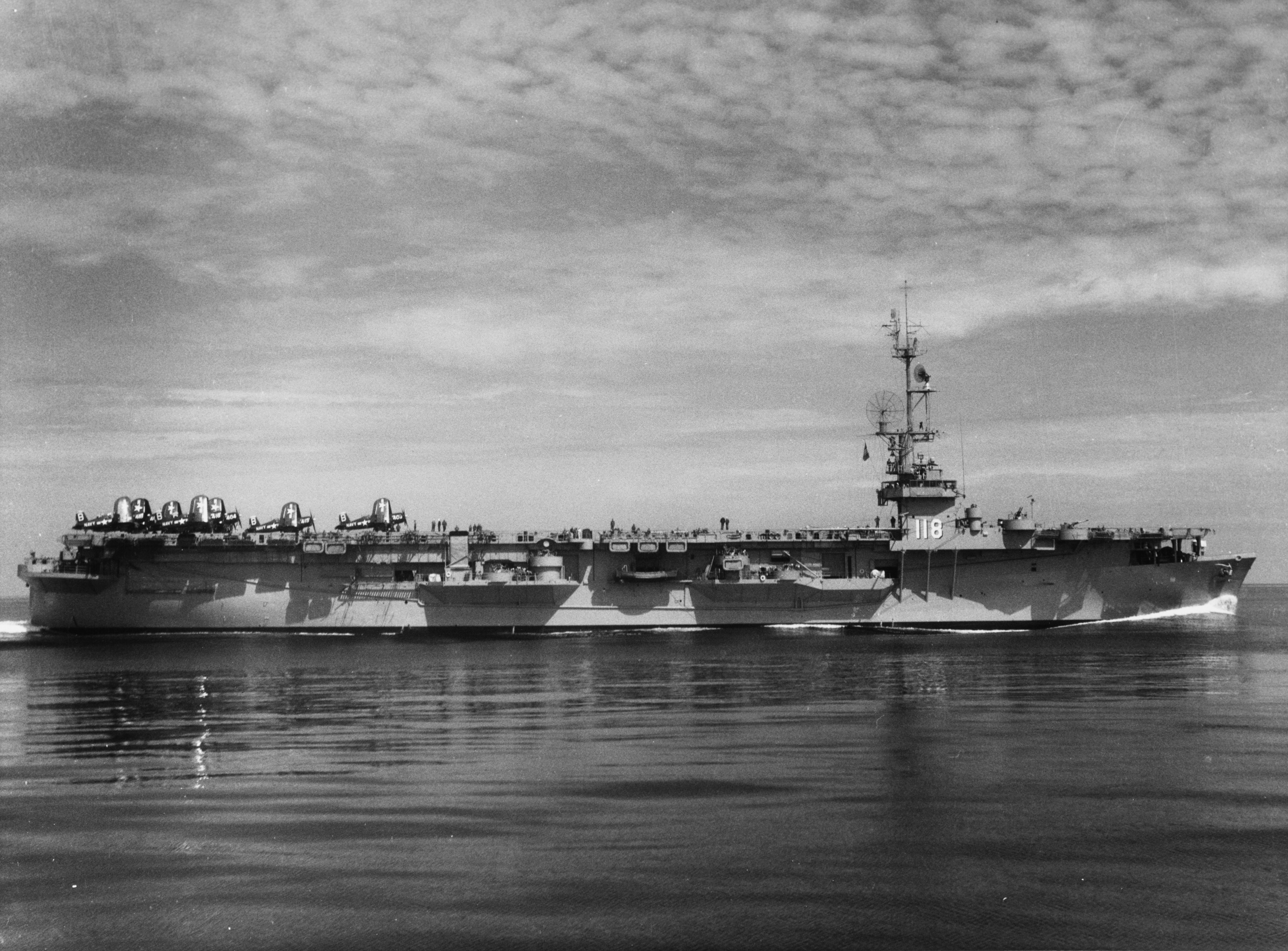
- USS Sicily in April of 1954

History

United States
- Name: USS Sicily
- Builder: Todd Pacific Shipyards
- Laid down: 23 October 1944
- Launched: 14 April 1945
- Commissioned: 27 February 1946
- Decommissioned: 4 Oct 1954
- Stricken: 1 July 1960
- Fate: Sold for scrap, 31 October 1960

General characteristics
- Class & type: Commencement Bay-class escort carrier
- Displacement: 21,397 long tons (21,740 t)
- Length: 557 ft 1 in (169.80 m) loa
- Beam: 75 ft (23 m)
- Draft: 32 ft (9.8 m)
- Installed power: 16,000 shp (12,000 kW); 4 × boilers
- Propulsion: 2 × Steam turbines; 2 × screw propellers
- Speed: 19 knots (35 km/h; 22 mph)
- Complement: 1,066
- Armament: 2 × 5 in (127 mm) dual-purpose guns; 36 × 40 mm (1.6 in) Bofors AA guns; 20 × 20 mm (0.8 in) Oerlikon AA guns
- Aircraft carried: 33
- Aviation facilities: 2 × aircraft catapults

USS Sicily was a Commencement Bay-class escort carrier in the United States Navy. The Commencement Bay class were built during World War II, and were an improvement over the earlier Sangamon class, which were converted from oil tankers. They were capable of carrying an air group of 33 planes and were armed with an anti-aircraft battery of 5 in (127 mm), 40 mm (1.6 in), and 20 mm (0.8 in) guns. The ships were capable of a top speed of 19 knots (35 km/h; 22 mph), and due to their origin as tankers, had extensive fuel storage.

She was named in honor of the successful Allied invasion of Sicily during World War II. Sicily was laid down on 23 October 1944 by Todd-Pacific Shipyards, Tacoma, Washington, as Sandy Bay; launched on 14 April 1945; sponsored by Mrs. Julius Vanderwiele; renamed Sicily on 5 June 1945; and commissioned on 27 February 1946, Capt. B. W. Wright in command.

== Design ==
In 1941, as United States participation in World War II became increasingly likely, the US Navy embarked on a construction program for escort carriers, which were converted from transport ships of various types. Many of the escort carrier types were converted from C3-type transports, but the Sangamon-class escort carriers were instead rebuilt oil tankers. These proved to be very successful ships, and the Commencement Bay class, authorized for Fiscal Year 1944, were an improved version of the Sangamon design. The new ships were faster, had improved aviation facilities, and had better internal compartmentation. They proved to be the most successful of the escort carriers, and the only class to be retained in active service after the war, since they were large enough to operate newer aircraft.

Sicily was 557 ft 1 in (169.80 m) long overall, with a beam of 75 ft (23 m) at the waterline, which extended to 105 ft 2 in (32.05 m) at maximum. She displaced 21,397 long tons (21,740 t) at full load, of which 12,876 long tons (13,083 t) could be fuel oil (though some of her storage tanks were converted to permanently store seawater for ballast), and at full load she had a draft of 27 ft 11 in (8.51 m). The ship's superstructure consisted of a small island. She had a complement of 1,066 officers and enlisted men.

The ship was powered by two Allis-Chalmers geared steam turbines, each driving one screw propeller, using steam provided by four Combustion Engineering-manufactured water-tube boilers. The propulsion system was rated to produce a total of 16,000 shp (12,000 kW) for a top speed of 19 knots (35 km/h; 22 mph). Given the very large storage capacity for oil, the ships of the Commencement Bay class could steam for some 23,900 nautical miles (44,300 km; 27,500 mi) at a speed of 15 knots (28 km/h; 17 mph).

Her defensive anti-aircraft armament consisted of two 5 in (127 mm) dual-purpose guns in single mounts, thirty-six 40 mm (2 in) Bofors guns, and twenty 20 mm (1 in) Oerlikon light AA cannons. The Bofors guns were placed in three quadruple and twelve twin mounts, while the Oerlikon guns were all mounted individually. She carried 33 planes, which could be launched from two aircraft catapults. Two elevators transferred aircraft from the hangar to the flight deck.

== Service history ==
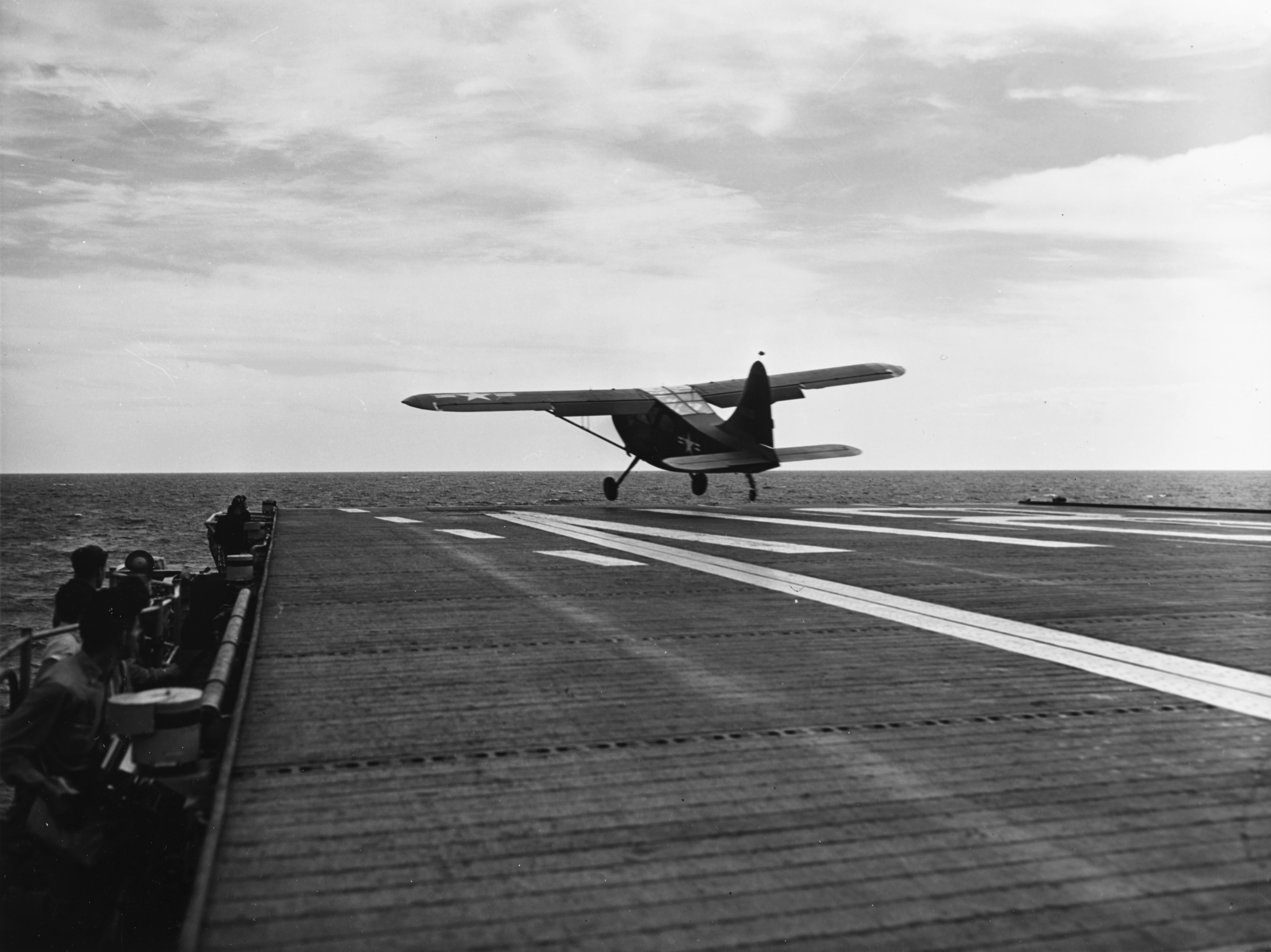
A United States Marine Corps OY-2 takes off from Sicily in 1950.

The first fifteen ships of the Commencement Bay class were ordered on 23 January 1943, allocated to Fiscal Year 1944. The ship was laid down at the Todd-Pacific Shipyards in Tacoma, Washington, on 23 October 1944. She was launched on 14 April, originally named Sandy Bay, but on 5 June was renamed Sicily for the Battle of Sicily, fought in July and August 1943. After completing fitting-out work, she was commissioned into active service on 27 February 1946, by which time World War II had ended. She moved to Portland, Oregon, for final fitting out, before continuing on to Seattle, Washington, for supplies, and then sailing on to San Diego, California. Sicily conducted a shakedown cruise off the coast of California in April and early May. On 15 May, the ship received orders to proceed to New York. After passing through the Panama Canal and stopping briefly at Norfolk, Virginia, she arrived in New York on 6 June and entered the Brooklyn Navy Yard. On 30 September, she departed for Argentia, Newfoundland, to participate in cold weather training. Sicily operated as part of the Atlantic Fleet for the next three years, based in Norfolk.

On 3 April 1950, Sicily was transferred to the Pacific Fleet, based in San Diego, California, where she arrived on 28 April. The outbreak of the Korean War on 25 June interrupted plans for anti-submarine warfare training over the summer, leading to Sicily's deployment to East Asian waters on 2 July. The ship got underway on 4 July to begin operations off Korea as the flagship of Carrier Division 15. She launched air strikes against North Korean positions using the fighters of VMF-214 on 3 August. She supported Allied ground operations at Pohang, the Battle of Inchon, the Second Battle of Seoul, and the marines' withdrawal after the Battle of Chosin Reservoir. On 5 February 1951, Sicily returned to San Diego. Her next deployment to Korea began on 13 May, which saw the ship resume combat operations off the eastern and western coasts of Korea until 12 October. Her third and final tour of the war lasted from 8 May 1952 to 4 December; during this period, she served with the United Nations Escort and Blockading Force.

Sicily made a fourth cruise in East Asian waters beginning on 14 July 1953, shortly before the Korean Armistice Agreement ended the fighting in Korea. Sicily received five battle stars for her operations during the war. Her voyage in the region lasted until 25 February 1954. After arriving back in California, the ship was decommissioned and allocated to the Pacific Reserve Fleet. By this time, the Navy had begun replacing the Commencement Bay-class ships with much larger Essex-class aircraft carriers, since the former were too small to operate newer and more effective anti-submarine patrol planes. Proposals to radically rebuild the Commencement Bays either with an angled flight deck and various structural improvements or lengthen their hulls by 30 ft (9.1 m) and replace their propulsion machinery to increase speed came to nothing, as they were deemed to be too expensive. She remained in the reserve fleet for the next six years. She was struck from the Naval Vessel Register on 1 July 1960 before being sold on 31 October to the Nicolai Joffe Corporation, to be broken up.

== See also ==
- VS-931, antisubmarine squadron
