= Joseph J. Went =

United States Marine Corps general

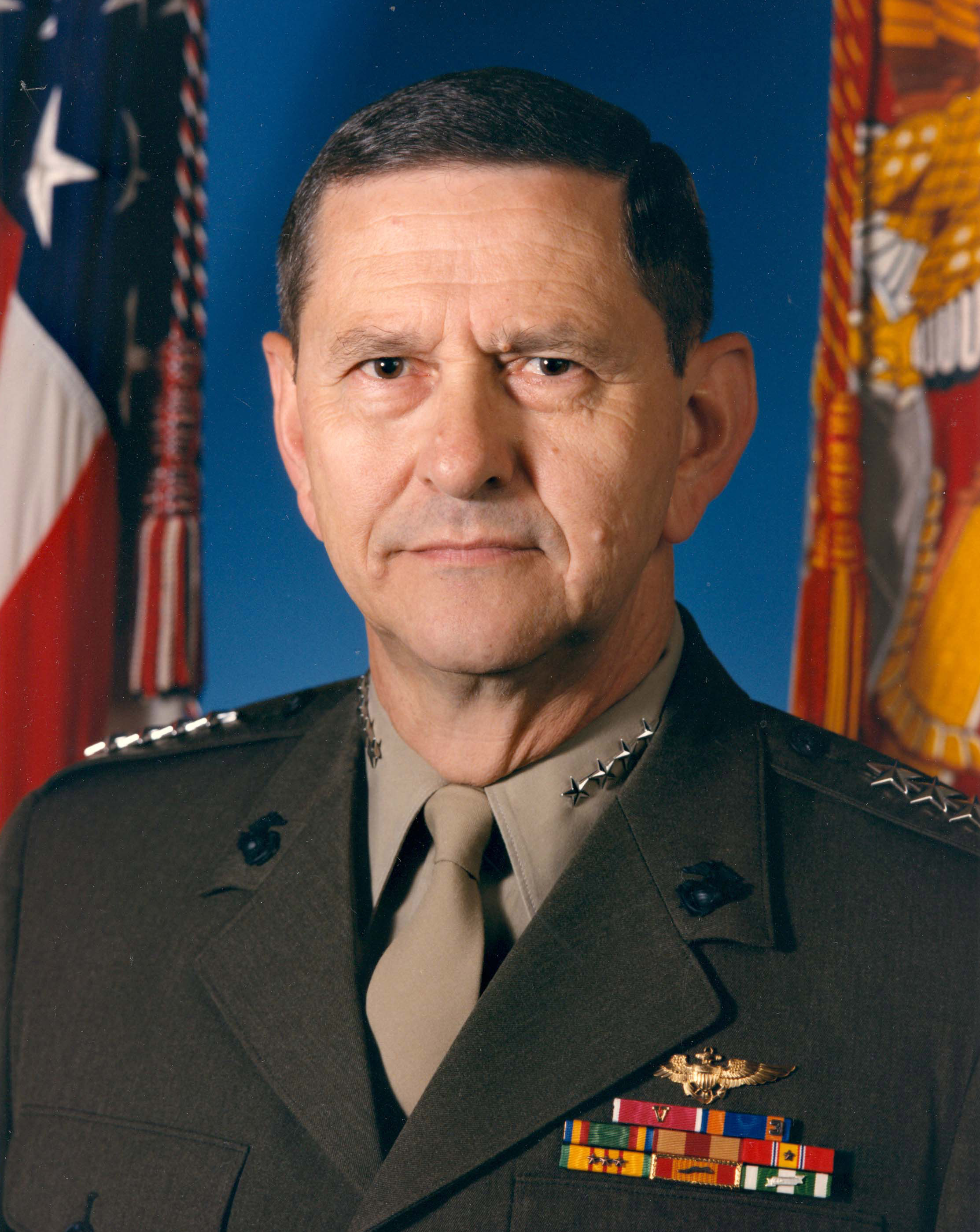
- General Joseph J. Went
- Born: September 16, 1930 (age 96); New Milford, Connecticut, U.S.
- Military career
- Allegiance: United States of America
- Branch: United States Marine Corps
- Service years: 1952–1990
- Rank: General
- Commands: H&MS-12; VMA-214; Marine Aircraft Group 24; 3rd FSSG; 1st Marine Aircraft Wing; Assistant Commandant of the Marine Corps
- Conflicts: Vietnam War
- Awards: Legion of Merit

Joseph John Went (born September 16, 1930) is a retired United States Marine Corps four-star general. His final assignment was as Assistant Commandant of the Marine Corps and Chief of Staff. He retired in 1990 after 38 years of service.

== Biography ==
Joseph J. Went was born in New Milford, Connecticut on 16 September 1930. In 1953, he received a Bachelor of Arts degree in Chemistry from the University of Connecticut. He received a master's degree in Business Administration from George Washington University in 1963, and graduated with distinction from the Naval War College in June 1972.

=== Marine Corps career ===
Went entered the Marine Corps in July 1952 and was commissioned a second lieutenant in December 1952. Following completion of The Basic School in June 1953, he underwent flight training at the Naval Air Station Pensacola. Second lieutenant Went was promoted to first lieutenant on 18 August 1954, and was designated a naval aviator a month later.

He was promoted to captain on 1 July 1956, major on 1 November 1963, lieutenant colonel on 1 October 1967, and colonel on 1 July 1974. During these years, he served with Marine attack, reconnaissance, transport and fighter squadrons. He commanded Headquarters and Maintenance Squadron 12, Marine Attack Squadron 214, Marine Aircraft Group 24, the 3rd Force Service Support Group, and the 1st Marine Aircraft Wing. He also had extensive experience in operational and joint planning, financial management and logistics.

Colonel Went assumed duty as Chief of Staff, 1st Marine Brigade, Hawaii, in April 1976. While serving in this capacity, he was selected in February 1978 for promotion to brigadier general. He assumed duty as Deputy Fiscal Director of the Marine Corps on 1 April 1978 and was advanced to brigadier general on 1 August 1978. In June 1980, he was assigned duty as Commanding General, 3rd Force Service Support Group (Rein), FMF, Pacific, Okinawa, Japan. He was advanced to major general on 2 June 1982 and assigned duty as Commanding General, 1st Marine Aircraft Wing, FMF, Pacific, Okinawa, Japan. MajGen Went served in this capacity until May 1983. On 6 June 1983, he was assigned duty as the Deputy Commander, Fleet Marine Force, Pacific, Camp H. M. Smith, Hawaii. During June 1984, MajGen Went reported to Headquarters Marine Corps where he was assigned as Deputy Chief of Staff for Reserve Affairs. On 6 June 1985, he became Deputy Chief of Staff for Installations and Logistics and was promoted to lieutenant general on 1 August 1985.

Lieutenant General Went was appointed to the grade of general and reassigned as the Assistant Commandant of the Marine Corps on 1 July 1988. He assumed additional duties as the Chief of Staff on 6 October 1988. He served in both these capacities until 31 July 1990. Gen Went retired from the Marine Corps on 1 August 1990 after 38 years of military service.

=== In retirement ===
General Went is on the board of directors of the Armed Services YMCA (ASYMCA) which provides support services to military service members and their families.

== Awards and decorations ==
General Went's decorations include:

Badge	Naval Aviator Badge		
1st row	Navy Distinguished Service Medal		
2nd row	Army Distinguished Service Medal	Legion of Merit w/ valor device	Air Medal w/ Strike/Flight numeral "3"
3rd row	Navy Unit Commendation	Marine Corps Expeditionary Medal	National Defense Service Medal w/ 1 service star
4th row	Vietnam Service Medal w/ 3 service stars	Vietnam Gallantry Cross unit citation	Vietnam Campaign Medal

== See also ==
- List of United States Marine Corps four-star generals

== Notes ==
Military offices
Preceded by Thomas R. Morgan	Assistant Commandant of the Marine Corps; 1988-1990	Succeeded by John R. Dailey
