= John K. Davis =

United States Marine Corps general (1927–2019)

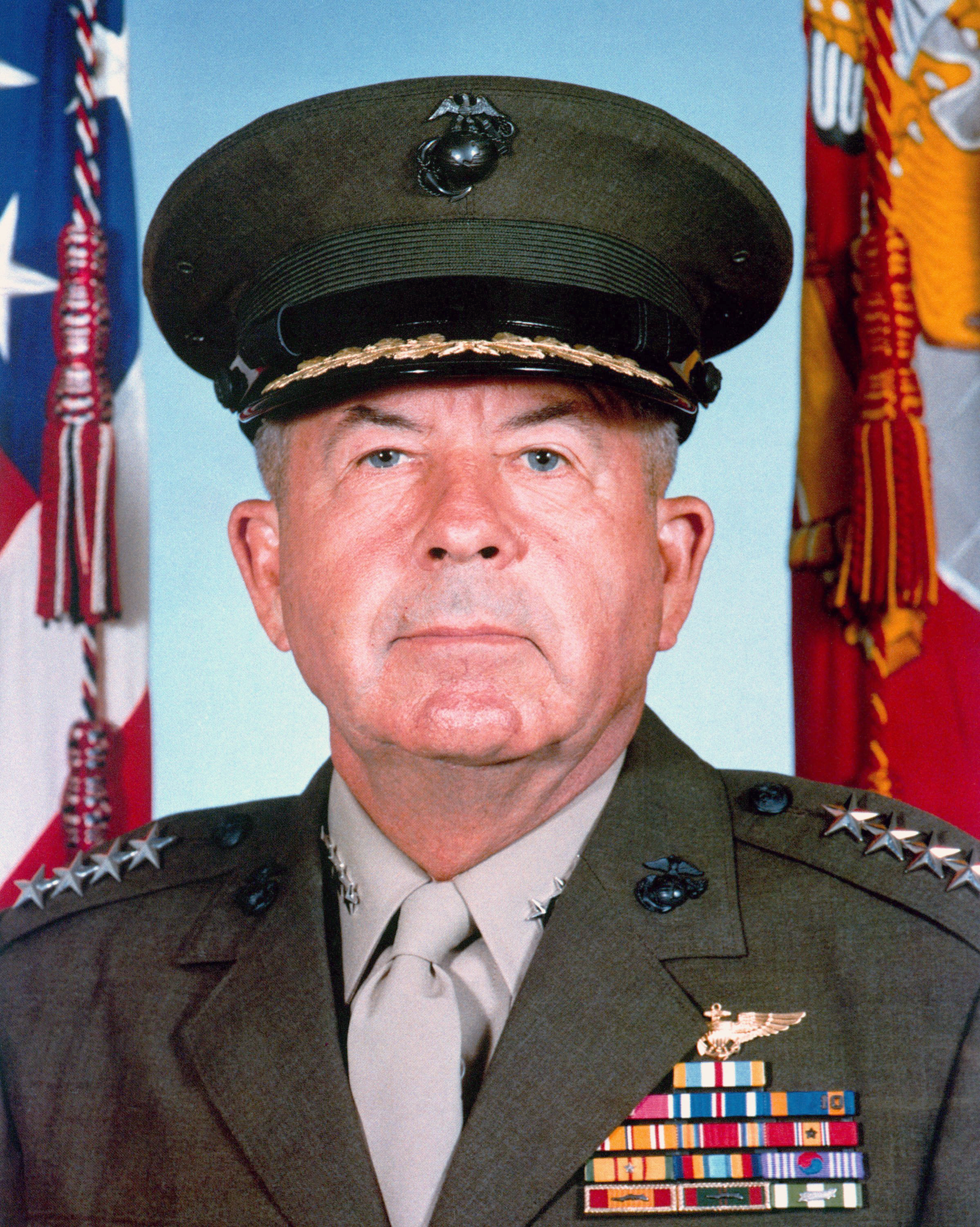
- Davis as Assistant Commandant of the Marine Corps (1983)
- Born: March 14, 1927; Hagan, New Mexico, U.S.
- Died: July 31, 2019 (aged 92); Mission Viejo, California, U.S.
- Military career
- Allegiance: United States of America
- Branch: Marine Corps
- Service years: 1945–1986
- Rank: General
- Commands: VMFA(AW)-224; Marine Aircraft Group 46; 3rd Marine Aircraft Wing; 1st Marine Aircraft Wing; Assistant Commandant of the Marine Corps
- Conflicts: Vietnam War
- Awards: Distinguished Service Medal; Defense Superior Service Medal; Legion of Merit; Distinguished Flying Cross

John Kerry Davis (March 14, 1927 – July 31, 2019), also known as J.K. Davis, was a United States Marine Corps four-star general. Davis, a Vietnam War veteran and naval aviator, served as the Commanding General of the 3rd Marine Aircraft Wing (1977–1978) and the 1st Marine Aircraft Wing (1978-1978). His final assignment was as the Assistant Commandant of the Marine Corps from July 1, 1983, to June 1, 1986.

== Biography ==
=== Early life and Military career ===
Davis was born on March 14, 1927, in Hagan, New Mexico. He graduated from Albuquerque High School in 1945, and enlisted in the Marine Corps Reserve, attaining the rank of private first class prior to being released to inactive duty. He holds a B.A. degree in Social Studies from the University of New Mexico (1950), and an M.P.A. degree in Public Administration from George Washington University (1963). He was commissioned a U.S. Marine Corps second lieutenant in June 1950.

Upon completing The Basic School, Marine Corps Schools, Quantico, Virginia, in March 1951, Davis was assigned as a platoon commander, 3rd Amphibious Tractor Battalion, Camp Pendleton, Calif. He was promoted to first lieutenant in June 1952, and the following October he began flight training at the Naval Air Station Pensacola, Florida. He was promoted to captain in December 1953, and designated a Naval Aviator in June 1954.

Davis served as a training officer with VMF(N)-542 at Marine Corps Air Station El Toro, California. He remained in that billet until December 1954, when he was transferred to the 1st Marine Aircraft Wing, serving in Korea and Japan, as the S-4 Officer, and later, as the S-1 Officer, Marine All-Weather Fighter Squadron 513, Marine Aircraft Group 12. He returned to the United States in May 1956, as Operations Officer, Marine Air Control Squadron 4, Marine Wing Headquarters Group, 3rd Marine Aircraft Wing, at MCAS El Toro. He was later reassigned and served consecutively as the aviation safety officer in VMA-121, MAG-15, and VMA-311.

=== Vietnam War ===
In July 1959, Davis was transferred to the Naval Air Station Beeville, Texas, as S-3 Officer, Training Squadron 26. He was promoted to major in February 1961, and in July 1962, attended the Air Command and Staff College, Maxwell Air Force Base, Alabama. He completed the course in June 1963, and was ordered to MCAS Iwakuni, Japan, serving concurrently as S-3 Officer, Marine Wing Headquarters Group 1, and as Officer-in-Charge, Tactical Air Control Center, 1st Marine Aircraft Wing. From September 1964 to August 1967, he served as a staff officer in the Air Branch, Joint Exercise Planning Division, Headquarters, Allied Forces, Northern Europe, Oslo, Norway. He was promoted to lieutenant colonel in January 1966.

Davis returned to the United States in September 1967, and served consecutively as Executive Officer for Marine Aircraft Group 14, Commanding Officer of VMFA(AW)-224 and Commanding Officer again for VMAT(AW)-202. He attended the Industrial College of the Armed Forces in Washington, D.C., from August 1968 to June 1969, when he was ordered to the Republic of Vietnam as the 1st Marine Aircraft Wing Aviation Safety Officer, and later, as Executive Officer, Marine Aircraft Group 11.

Davis was promoted to colonel in August 1970, and a month later, returned to the United States as Executive Officer, Office of the Deputy Chief of Staff (Air), Headquarters Marine Corps, Washington, D.C. He remained in that billet until June 1973, when he transferred to El Toro as Commanding Officer, Marine Aircraft Group 46/Marine Air Reserve Training Detachment.

=== Peacetime ===
Davis became Assistant Wing Commander, 3rd Marine Aircraft Wing, MCAS El Toro, following his advancement to brigadier general on July 1, 1975, and assigned duty as Commander, Marine Corps Air Bases, Western Area/Commanding General, Marine Corps Air Station El Toro, in June 1976. During this tour he was advanced to major general on February 17, 1977, and assigned duty as Commanding General, 3rd Marine Aircraft Wing, MCAS El Toro. From July 6, 1977, to August 8, 1977, he was assigned additional duty as Commanding General, 1st Marine Amphibious Force, Marine Corps Base Camp Pendleton.

On February 15, 1978, he was assigned duty as the Commanding General, 1st Marine Aircraft Wing, Marine Corps Base Camp Smedley D. Butler, Okinawa, Japan. He was assigned duty as the Director of Operations, J-3, Pacific Command, Camp H. M. Smith, Hawaii on June 16, 1979. Davis was assigned duty as the Commanding General, Fleet Marine Force, Pacific, Camp H.M. Smith, Hawaii on June 30, 1981, and was promoted to lieutenant general on July 1, 1981. Upon promotion to general, Davis assumed the assignment as Assistant Commandant of the Marine Corps on July 1, 1983, and served in this capacity until his retirement on June 1, 1986. During his term as Assistant Commandant, he served as president of the Marine Corps Association.

Davis has flown over 30 different aircraft including; the F3D, F9F, F11F, A-6, F-4, F-104, A-4, AH-64, UH-1, CH-46, CH-53, FA-18, and the XV-15 (MV-22 Prototype). He flew 285 combat hours in Republic of Vietnam (160 at night) and 171 combat missions (100 at night).

He died on July 31, 2019, at the age of 92, from cancer.

== Medals and decorations ==
A complete list of his medals and decorations include:

Naval Aviator Badge
	Navy Distinguished Service Medal	Defense Superior Service Medal	
Legion of Merit w/ valor device	Distinguished Flying Cross	Air Medal w/ Strike/Flight numeral "10"	Asiatic-Pacific Campaign Medal
World War II Victory Medal	National Defense Service Medal w/ 1 service star	Vietnam Service Medal w/ 5 service stars	Navy Sea Service Deployment Ribbon
Order of National Security Merit, Gugseon Medal	Vietnam Gallantry Cross unit citation	Vietnam Civil Actions unit citation	Vietnam Campaign Medal

== See also ==
- List of United States Marine Corps four-star generals

== Notes ==
Military offices
Preceded by Paul X. Kelley	Assistant Commandant of the Marine Corps; 1983-1986	Succeeded by Thomas R. Morgan
