= Marine Wing Support Squadron 171 =

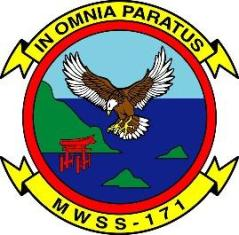
- MWSS-171's insignia
- Active: 16 April 1979 – present
- Country: United States
- Branch: USMC
- Type: Aviation ground support squadron
- Role: Support element
- Size: 600+
- Part of: Marine Air Group 12; 1st Marine Aircraft Wing
- Garrison/HQ: Marine Corps Air Station Iwakuni
- Nickname: "The Sentinels"
- Mottos: "In Omnia Paratus" "Ready for all things"
- Engagements: Operation Enduring Freedom; Operation Iraqi Freedom

Commanders
- Current commander: LtCol Gabriel D. Sanchez

Marine Wing Support Squadron 171 (MWSS-171) is an aviation ground support unit of the United States Marine Corps. Known as "The Sentinels", they are based out of Marine Corps Air Station Iwakuni, Japan. The squadron is part of Marine Aircraft Group 12 and the 1st Marine Aircraft Wing.

== Mission ==
Provide all essential Aviation Ground Support requirements to a designated fixed wing component of an Aviation Combat Element and all supporting or attached elements of the Marine Air Control Group. Additionally, the Squadron has the implied mission to supplement airbase facilities and services at Marine Corps Air Station Iwakuni, with support routed through MAG-12 for tasking.

== History ==
Marine Wing Support Squadron 171 began as Detachment "C" of Marine Wing Support Group 17, activated 16 April 1979. Formed from elements of Wing Engineer Squadron 17, Wing Transportation Squadron 17, and Headquarters Squadron 17. Having absorbed personnel and equipment from Marine Air Base Squadrons 12 and 15, Detachment "C" was re-designated Marine Wing Support Squadron 171 on 16 June 1986.

=== The 1990s ===
In June 1991, Mount Pinatubo on the island of Luzon (Republic of the Philippines) catastrophically erupted. In 1992, elements of Marine Wing Support Squadron 171 assisted in the final retrograde of personnel and equipment from Subic Bay Naval Base and Cubi Point Naval Air Station, located just 40 km to the southwest of the volcano.

Elements of MWSS-171 served among the almost 30,000 US military personnel that participated in Operation Restore Hope in Somalia in 1992, returning home to MCAS Iwakuni in May 1993.

=== Global War on Terror ===
Elements of the squadron continue to participate in Operation Enduring Freedom, in Afghanistan, and Operation Iraqi Freedom, in Iraq, from September 2001 to the present.

=== Operation Tomodachi ===
After the 2011 tsunami hit Japan, the squadron provided support for the transport of supplies to victims of the tsunami. A small detachment was also sent to Sendai to assist in cleanup, as well as provide shower support for refugees.

=== Exercise Forager Fury ===
MWSS-171 has conducted multiple exercises in the Pacific, showcasing its ability to support Marine Aircraft Groups in expeditionary environments and conditions.

== See also ==
- List of United States Marine Corps aviation support units
- Organization of the United States Marine Corps
- United States Marine Corps Aviation
