= Thomas R. Morgan =

American military officer (1930–2024)

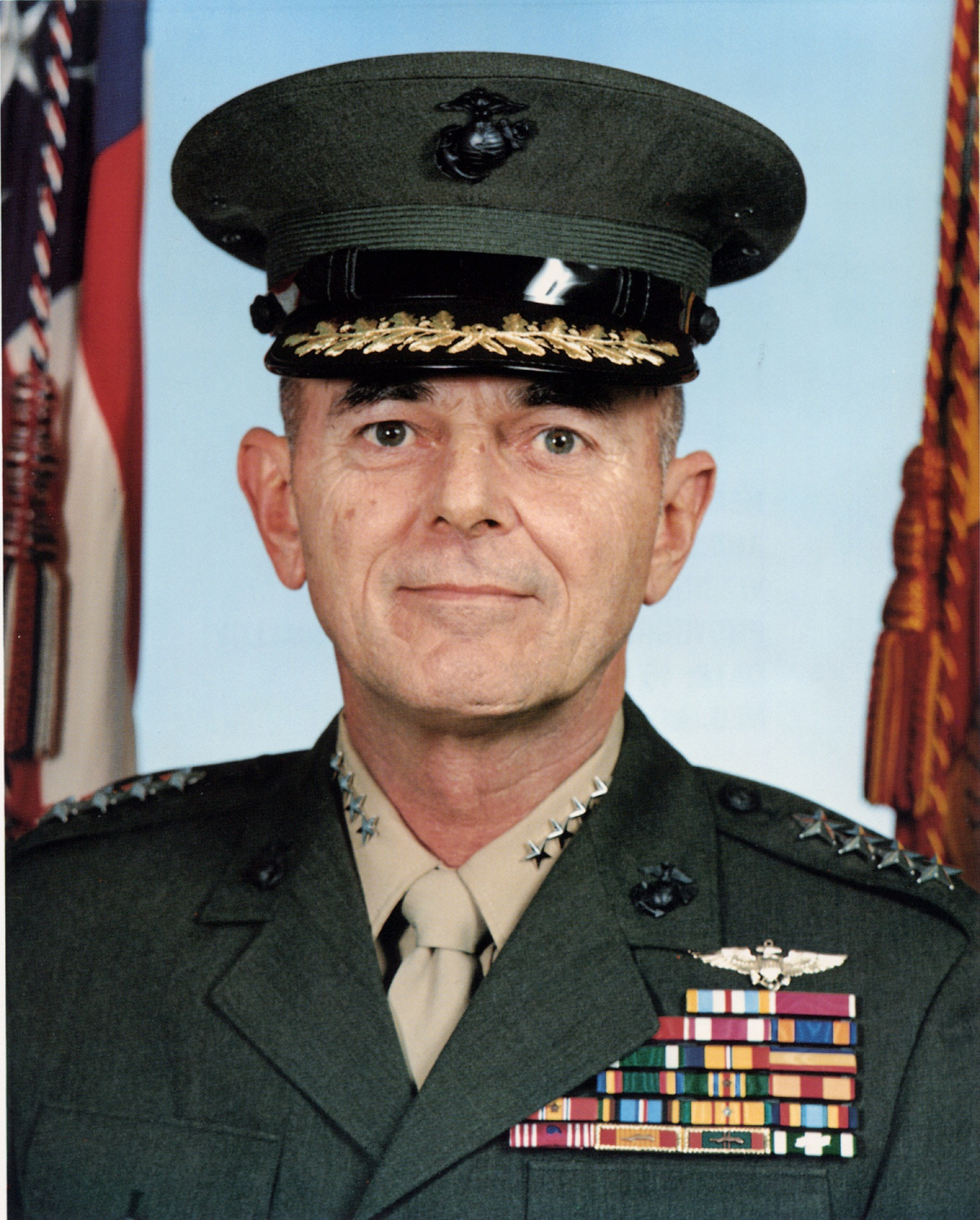
- General Thomas R. Morgan, USMC
- Born: January 6, 1930; Allentown, Pennsylvania, U.S.
- Died: December 6, 2024 (aged 94); Fairfax Station, Virginia, U.S.
- Military career
- Allegiance: United States of America
- Branch: United States Marine Corps
- Service years: 1952-1988
- Rank: General
- Commands: Assistant Commandant of the Marine Corps
- Conflicts: Vietnam War
- Awards: Defense Superior Service Medal; Legion of Merit; Bronze Star; Air Medal

General Thomas Rowland Morgan (January 6, 1930 – December 6, 2024) was an American Marine Corps general who served as Assistant Commandant of the United States Marine Corps from June 1986 until his retirement on July 1, 1988.

== Early life and education ==
Thomas Rowland Morgan was born on January 6, 1930, in Allentown, Pennsylvania to Harry C. and Olwen G. (Pierce) Morgan. He grew up in nearby Slatington, where he graduated from Slatington High School in 1948. He was a varsity player in basketball, baseball, and football, and served as captain of the basketball team during his junior and senior years in high school. In addition to his athletic achievements, he served as junior and senior class president, was inducted into the National Honor Society, and earned recognition as both "Most Dependable" and "Most Likely to Succeed."

Morgan went on to study at Colgate University in Hamilton, New York, where played on the basketball them and was a member of the Sigma Chi fraternity. He received a Bachelor of Arts degree in history and political science from Colgate in 1952. Upon graduating from Colgate, he was commissioned as a second lieutenant in the Marine Corps.

In June 1973, Morgan completed a Master of Arts degree in counselor education at the University of Virginia in Charlottesville.

== Military career ==
=== Early assignments (1952–1959) ===
Morgan was commissioned as a second lieutenant in the United States Marine Corps on June 6, 1952. After completing The Basic School in Quantico, Virginia, he was assigned to Naval Air Station Pensacola in Florida for flight training. He was designated a Naval Aviator in August 1954 and was subsequently stationed at Marine Corps Air Station El Toro in California. There, he served as assistant maintenance officer for Marine Night Fighter Squadron 542, part of Marine Aircraft Group 15 in the 3rd Marine Aircraft Wing.

In July 1955, Morgan was assigned to the 1st Marine Aircraft Wing in the Western Pacific, where he served as personnel officer for Marine Night Fighter Squadron 513, Marine Aircraft Group 11 and later as aide-de-camp to the commanding general of the wing. He was promoted to captain in August 1955.

Upon returning to Hawaii in July 1956, Morgan served as aide to the deputy commander of the Fleet Marine Force (FMF) in the Pacific, from July 1956 until July 1957. He continued his career in Hawaii as the assistant operations officer for Marine Attack Squadron 214 at Marine Corps Air Station, Kaneohe Bay .

=== Flight Instructor and early Staff positions (1959–1967) ===
In January 1959, Morgan was assigned to NAS Olathe, Kansas, as a flight instructor with the Navy's Jet Transitional Training Unit. After the unit was disestablished in October 1959, he was transferred to Marine Aircraft Group 32 at Marine Corps Air Station Beaufort, in South Carolina. There, he served as personnel officer and aircraft maintenance officer for Marine Fighter Squadron 333 until November 1961. He then returned to Japan as executive officer of Headquarters and Maintenance Squadron 11, Marine Aircraft Group 11 in NAS Atsugi, where he served until January 1962.

From 1962 to 1965, Morgan served as the fleet liaison officer at Marine Corps Air Station, Yuma, Arizona, where he coordinated aviation weapons training. He was promoted to major in July 1963. In July 1965, he was reassigned to Marine Aircraft Group 32 at MCAS Beaufort, where he served as Group Operations Officer and later as commanding officer of Marine Fighter Attack Squadron 312.

From January 1962 to July 1965, he served as the fleet liaison officer at Marine Corps Air Station, Yuma, Arizona, coordinating aviation weapons training. He was promoted to major in July 1963. Reassigned to Quantico, he entered the Command and Staff College, completing the course in June 1966. Morgan was ordered to Marine Aircraft Group 32, 2nd Marine Aircraft Wing at MCAS Beaufort, South Carolina in July 1966, where he served as group operations officer and later as commanding officer, Marine Fighter Attack Squadron 312. He was promoted to lieutenant colonel in July 1967.

=== Vietnam and additional Staff assignments (1968–1977) ===
In August 1968, he reported to Marine Aircraft Group 13 at Chu Lai, serving as group operations officer and then as officer-in-charge of the DaNang DASC in Vietnam.

He returned to the United States in September 1969 and was assigned as executive officer of Marine Corps Air Station, Quantico, and later as G-3 Marine Corps Base. From July 1971 until July 1973, he was assigned to the Naval Reserve Officer Training Corps Unit at the University of Virginia, where he served as executive officer.

Promoted to colonel in July 1973, Morgan was ordered to the U.S. European Command Headquarters in Stuttgart, Germany, where he served as the chief of War Plans Branch, J-5. He remained in that position until he was assigned duty as assistant deputy chief of staff for requirements and programs, Headquarters Marine Corps, Washington, D.C. While serving in this capacity, he was selected in February 1977 for promotion to brigadier general.

=== General officer (1977–1988) ===
He received the promotion to brigadier general on March 18, 1977, and assumed duty as Assistant Division Commander, 3rd Marine Division, on Okinawa, Japan from April 1977 to April 1978.

On June 17, 1978, he was assigned as the assistant chief of staff (C-5) of the Combined Forces Command, Seoul, Korea. He served in this capacity until assuming duty as deputy commander, FMF, Pacific, Camp H. M. Smith, Hawaii, in July 1980.

On May 1, 1981, Morgan was promoted to major general with date of rank of August 1, 1977. He was assigned duty as the deputy chief of staff for Requirements and Programs, Headquarters Marine Corps, on May 26, 1981. On June 13, 1985, he was advanced to lieutenant general and assumed the duty as deputy chief of staff for plans, policies and operations. He was assigned additional duties as acting chief of staff on November 16, 1985.

Morgan was nominated by the president to the grade of general and assigned as Assistant Commandant of the Marine Corps in March 1986. Upon advancement to general on June 1, 1986, he assumed his final assignment. He retired on July 1, 1988, after completion of more than 36 years of active service.

Throughout his career, General Morgan made significant contributions to the Marine Corps, particularly through his leadership in numerous overseas assignments, his impact on aviation operations, and his strategic approach to military planning. His service took him to various locations worldwide, including the Western Pacific, Vietnam, Europe, and Korea, where he played a key role in shaping Marine Corps operations and doctrine.

== Retirement years and death ==
After retiring from active duty, General Morgan remained actively engaged with the military community, dedicating time to supporting veterans and military organizations. He served on the board of governors of the USO for 10 years and the board of directors of the Armed Forces Benefits Association (AFBA) for 15 years. He served as a senior fellow for the National Defense University's CAPSTONE Course for well over 20 years, where he mentored generals and flag officers from all branches of the military. He served as military advisor to the board of regents of the Uniformed Services University of the Health Sciences (USUHS) for over 20 years. In 2011, he was the recipient of an honorary Doctorate of Humane Letters from Colgate University.

Morgan died at the age of 94 on December 6, 2024, in Fairfax Station, Virginia. He was predeceased by his wife of 66 years, Barbara, who died on September 7, 2023. He was survived by his three daughters and their husbands, four grandsons, and a great-granddaughter.

In his honor, the U.S. Flag was flown at half-mast on 4 February 2025 on all U.S. Navy ships and U.S. Navy and Marine Corps stations until sunset.

== Awards and decorations ==
General Morgan's personal awards and decorations include:

Naval Aviator Badge
| 1st Row | Defense Superior Service Medal | | Legion of Merit | Bronze Star |
| 2nd Row | Meritorious Service Medal | Air Medal | Navy and Marine Corps Commendation Medal | Combat Action Ribbon |
| 3rd Row | Navy Presidential Unit Citation | Navy Unit Commendation | Navy Meritorious Unit Commendation w/ 1 service star | Marine Corps Expeditionary Medal |
| 4th Row | National Defense Service Medal w/ 1 service star | Armed Forces Expeditionary Medal | Vietnam Service Medal w/ 5 service stars | Navy Sea Service Deployment Ribbon |
| 5th Row | Order of National Security Merit, Cheon-Su Medal | Vietnam Gallantry Cross unit citation | Vietnam Civil Actions unit citation | Vietnam Campaign Medal |

== See also ==
- List of United States Marine Corps four-star generals

Military offices
| Preceded by John K. Davis | Assistant Commandant of the Marine Corps; 1986-1988 | Succeeded by Joseph J. Went |
