= VMFA-242 =

Marine Fighter Attack Squadron 242
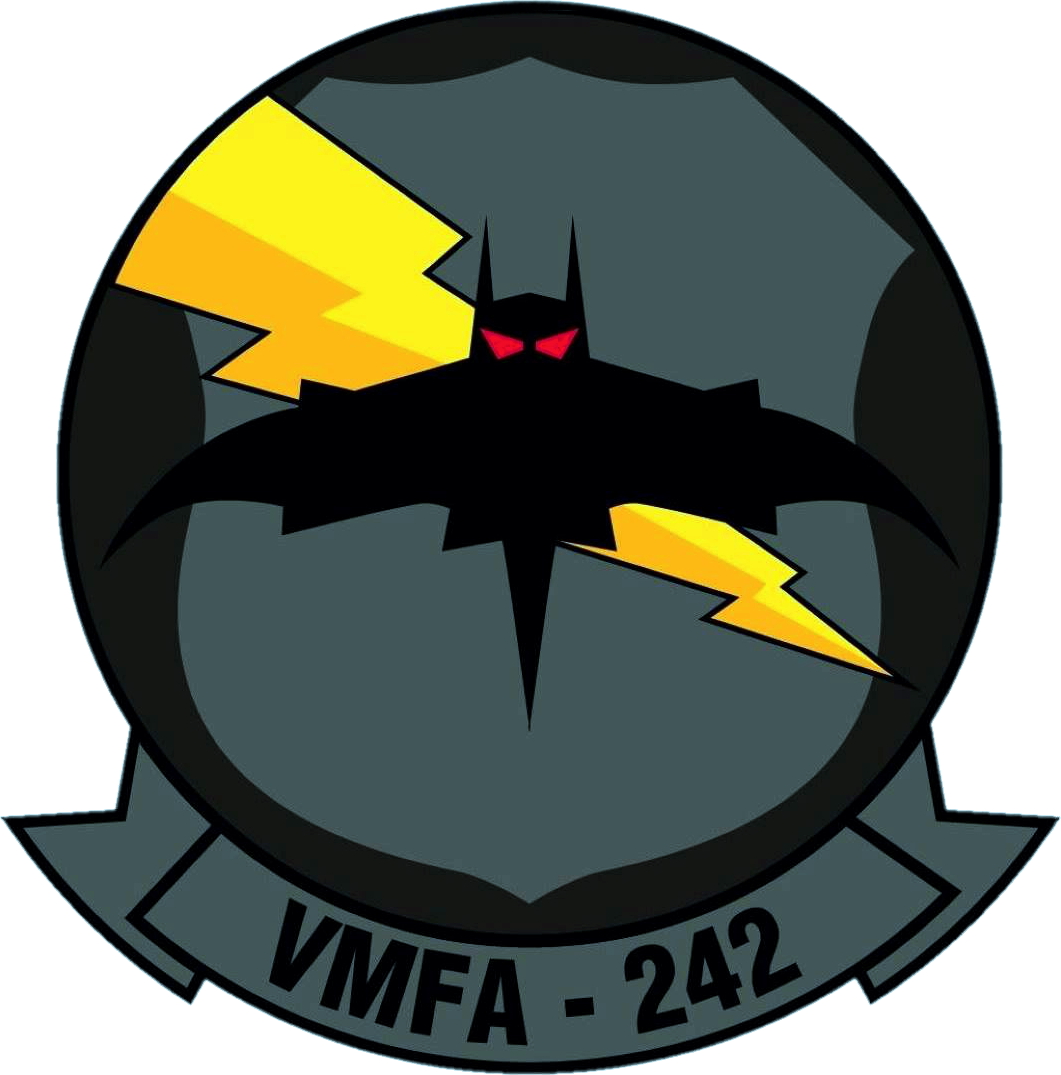
- VMFA-242 Patch
- Active: 1 Jul 1943 - 23 Nov 1945; 1 Oct 1960 - present
- Country: United States
- Branch: United States Marine Corps
- Type: Fighter/Attack
- Role: Close air support Air interdiction Aerial reconnaissance
- Part of: Marine Aircraft Group 12; 1st Marine Aircraft Wing; III Marine Expeditionary Force
- Garrison/HQ: Marine Corps Air Station Iwakuni
- Nicknames: Bats; Profane (callsign)
- Motto: "Victory by Dawn"
- Tail Code: DT
- Mascot: Bat
- Engagements: World War II; Battle of Saipan; Battle of Tinian; Battle of Iwo Jima; Vietnam War; Operation Iraqi Freedom; Operation Phantom Fury

Commanders
- Commanding Officer: LtCol. Nathaniel H. Thayer
- Executive Officer: Maj. Jeffrey D. Specht

Aircraft flown
- Attack: A-6 Intruder; A-4 Skyhawk; F/A-18D Hornet; F/A-18C Hornet
- Bomber: TBM Avenger
- Fighter: F-35B Lightning II

Marine Fighter Attack Squadron 242 (VMFA-242) is a United States Marine Corps squadron flying F-35B Lightning II STOVL Stealth Fighter. The squadron, known as the "Bats", is based at Marine Corps Air Station Iwakuni, Japan and falls under the command of Marine Aircraft Group 12 (MAG-12) and the 1st Marine Aircraft Wing (1st MAW). The radio callsign is "Profane".

== History ==
=== World War II ===
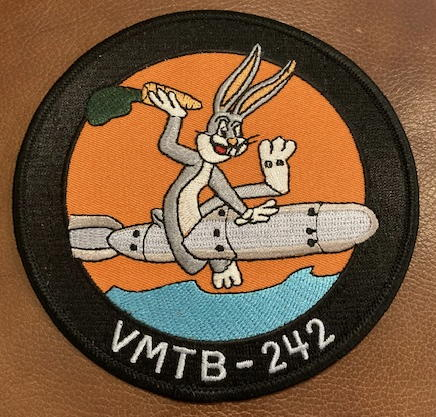
VMTB-242 patch during WWII while flying the TBM Avenger

Marine Torpedo Bombing Squadron 242 (VMTB-242) was commissioned on 1 July 1943 at Marine Corps Air Station El Centro, California. The squadron began training at MCAS El Centro flying the TBM Avenger. The squadron departed San Diego on 28 January 1944 on board the escort carrier USS Kitkun Bay. It arrived at Espiritu Santo in the Southwest Pacific on 15 February 1944. Thus began the squadron's long combat history, starting in the Northern Solomons, later shifting to the Battle of Saipan and Battle of Tinian, and finally to Battle of Iwo Jima where the squadron landed on D+17 and flew anti-submarine patrols until the end of World War II. On 5 November 1945, the squadron left Guam for San Diego and 18 days later was deactivated on 23 November 1945.

During WWII, Warner Brothers and Disney designed many patches for military units, including one for VMTB-242 with Bugs Bunny riding a torpedo.

=== Reactivation ===
Squadron patch after reactivation as VMA-242

On 1 October 1960 at Marine Corps Air Station Cherry Point, North Carolina the squadron was reactivated as Marine Attack Squadron 242 flying the A4D Skyhawk. During the Cuban Missile Crisis in October 1962, VMA-242 deployed to Naval Air Station Key West, Florida and maintained a ready posture until the Soviet withdrawal of offensive weapons from Cuba. In September 1963, VMA-242 embarked for duty with the 1st MAW. The squadron operated from MCAS Iwakuni, Japan until its return to MCAS Cherry Point in September 1964, at which time it transitioned to the A-6A Intruder and was redesignated VMA(AW)-242. The transition training was conducted by VA-42, the East Coast A-6 Fleet Replacement Squadron at Naval Air Station Oceana, Virginia. Advance teams of key VMA-242 personnel, began arriving at Oceana in the summer of 1963. They were the second line squadron to fly the A-6A after VA-75.

=== Vietnam War ===
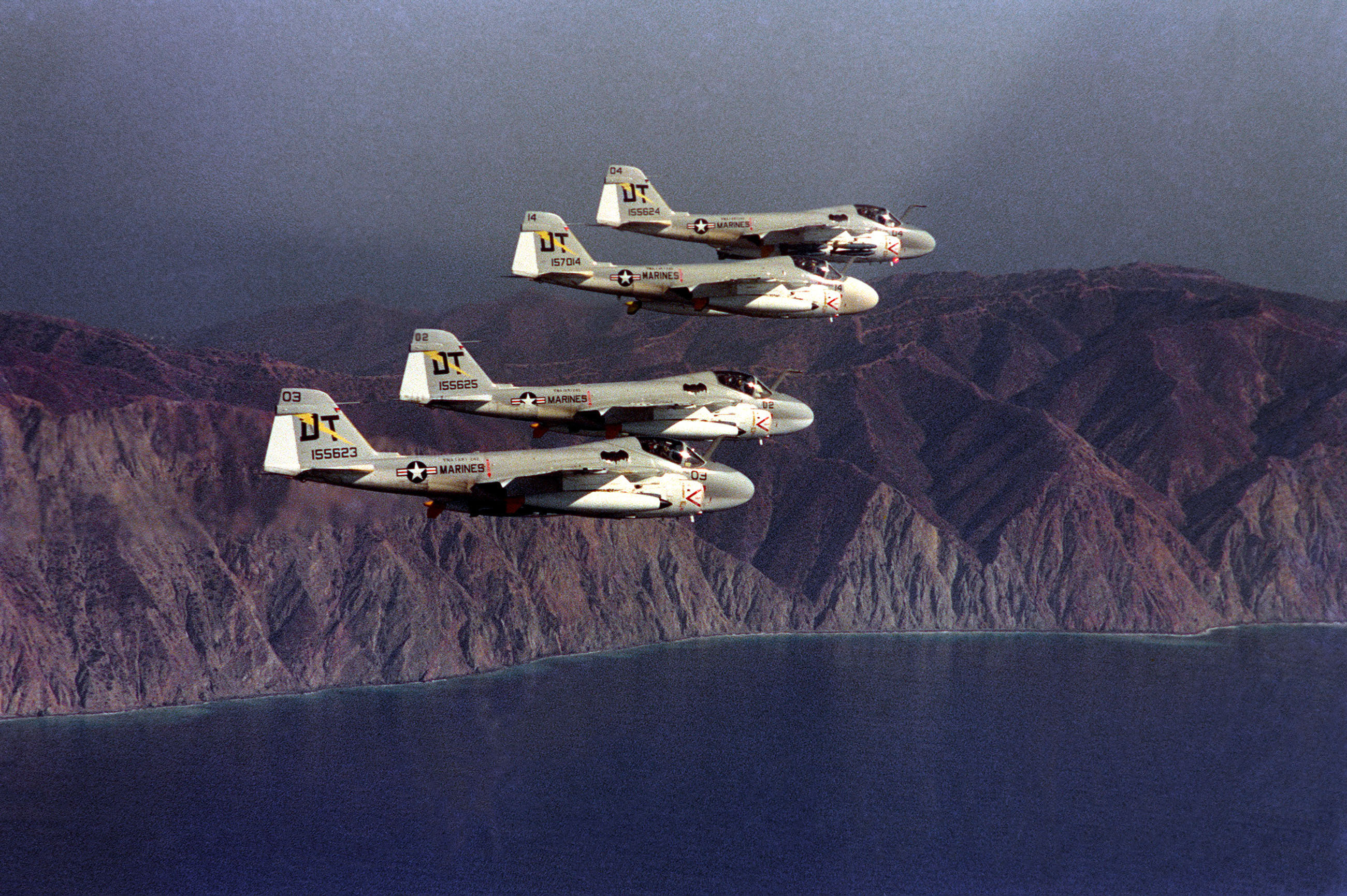
Four A-6A Intruders of VMA(AW)-242 in 1975

In late 1966, VMA(AW)-242 joined the 1st MAW at Da Nang Air Base, Republic of Vietnam and by November of that year, was participating in combat operations against the Viet Cong and the People's Army of Vietnam. Initially the squadron supported allied ground forces, but during April 1967, they were also assigned to the first of many Operation Rolling Thunder missions over North Vietnam. The squadron, utilizing the unique capabilities of the A-6, flew patrols over North Vietnam until the bombing halt late in 1968. Until the squadron's departure from Vietnam in late April 1971, the squadron continued supporting allied forces in South Vietnam, as well as flying sorties against the Ho Chi Minh Trail in North Vietnam and central Laos. During the squadron's tour in the Republic of Vietnam, VMA(AW)-242 logged 16,783 combat sorties and delivered 85,990 tons of ordnance. During the war, the squadron was known as the Batmen. At some date after the war this was modified to the Bats.

=== Post-Vietnam and the 1980s ===
VMA(AW)-242 arrived at Marine Corps Air Station El Toro, California in early September 1970 and became the first A-6A squadron in the 3rd Marine Aircraft Wing. In September 1977, the squadron transitioned to the A-6E aircraft. After ten years at MCAS El Toro, they again deployed overseas to MCAS Iwakuni as part of the six-month Unit Deployment Program (UDP). During this deployment, the squadron deployed and trained in such places as the Philippines, Okinawa, Japan, and Korea. Upon its return to MCAS El Toro on 22 April 1981, VMA(AW)-242 began receiving the latest model Intruder, the A-6E TRAM, in preparation for redeployment to MCAS Iwakuni in April 1982.

During August 1983, VMA(AW)-242 was the first Marine squadron to deploy to the African continent as part of Operation Eastern Wind in Berbera, Somalia. While in country, they conducted joint operations with the Somali Army Air Defense Force and the United States Navy and Air Force.

In April 1984 and November 1985, the squadron participated in its third and fourth UDP deployments to the Western Pacific. Returning to MCAS El Toro in May 1986, the squadron was awarded the Lawson H. M. Sanderson trophy as the Marine Corps Attack Squadron of the Year for 1986. In April 1987, the squadron made their fifth WestPac UDP deployment. October 1988 saw VMA(AW)-242 redeploy to MCAS Iwakuni, Japan for the sixth and final WestPac UDP with the A-6E Intruder.

A VMFA(AW)-242 F/A-18D Hornet in April 2020

=== 1990s ===
In August 1990, the squadron initially deployed as part of MAG-70 in Operation Desert Shield but got no further than MCAS Cherry Point for a few days in August 1990. Ten aircraft were flown to MCAS Cherry Point with the intent to trade four 3-G limited aircraft for unlimited aircraft from VMA(AW)-224 so that the squadron would have ten aircraft that were not impacted by the wing fatigue limitation program. However, at the last minute, it was decided to not deploy the squadron. All the squadron's aircraft were transferred to USMC and USN squadrons, and they returned to El Toro to begin transitioning to the F/A-18D Hornet a month earlier than originally planned.

On 14 December 1990, VMA(AW)-242 was re-designated as Marine All Weather Fighter Attack Squadron 242, and began conversion to the F/A-18D Hornet. VMFA(AW)-242 received its first aircraft in February 1991 with the final Hornet being accepted in August of that year. It was during the transition to the F/A-18D that the squadron adopted its motto, "Mors ex tenebris."

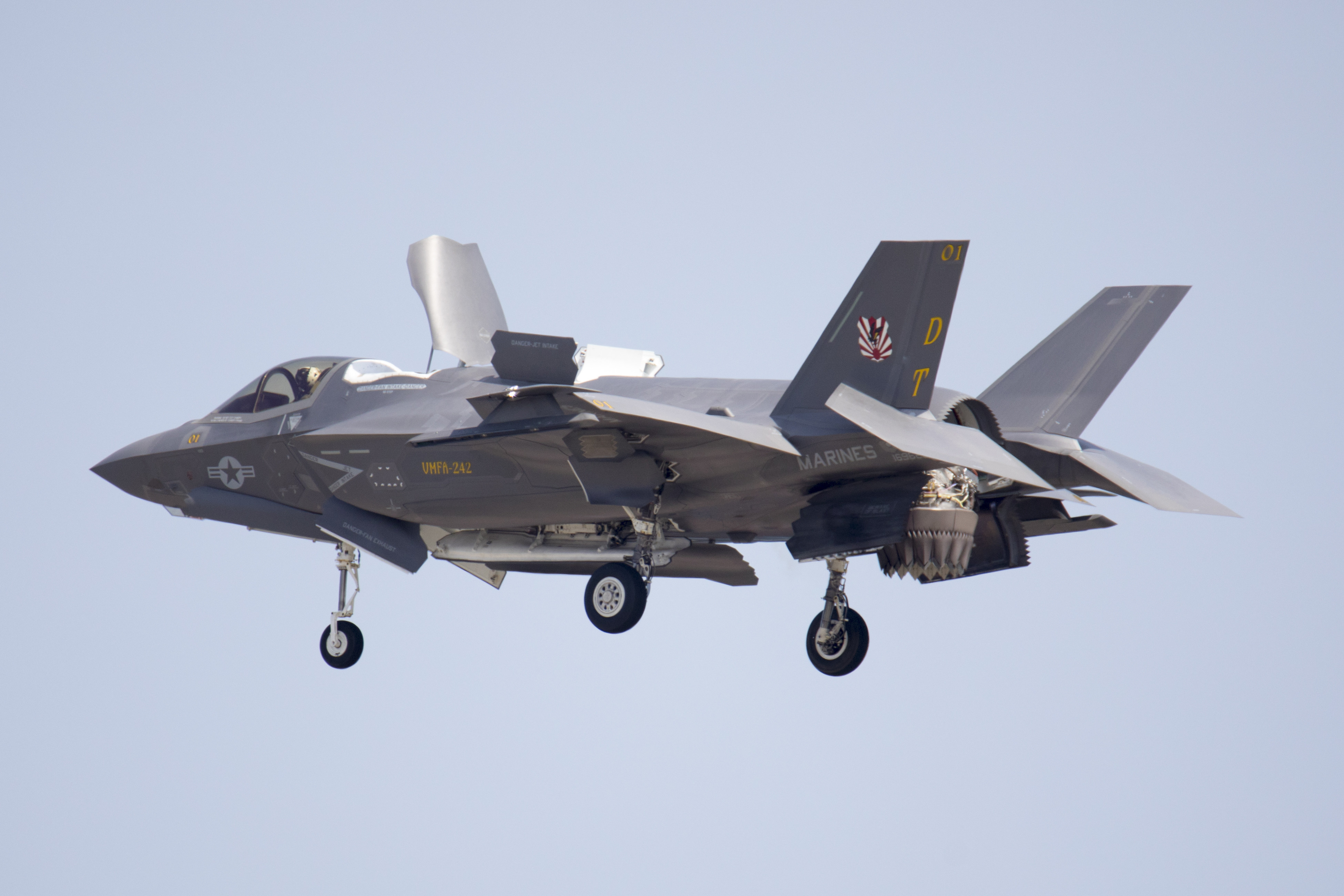
VMFA-242 F-35B, in April 2021.

=== The Global War on Terror ===
From 4 August 2004 to 18 March 2005, the squadron supported the Iraq War. Utilizing the combat callsign "Profane", VMFA(AW)-242 spent seven months flying out of Al Asad Airbase, Iraq. During this time they provided close air support for the 1st Marine Division during Operation Phantom Fury. Squadron sections flew cyclic missions dropping over 300,000 pounds of ordnance in support of Marines and Soldiers on the ground overtaking the city. During this battle, precision-guided ordnance was dropped close to friendly forces with zero cases of friendly fire. Just two months later, in January 2005, over a five-day period, squadron aircraft were airborne twenty-four hours a day in order to deter insurgents' efforts to undermine Iraq's first democratic elections. The squadron received the Robert M. Hanson "Marine Fighter Squadron" of the Year award in October 2005.

Due to a re-organization within Marine aviation, VMFA(AW)-242 moved from MAG-11 at MCAS Miramar to MAG-12 in its current home at MCAS Iwakuni in 2008.

=== 2020s ===
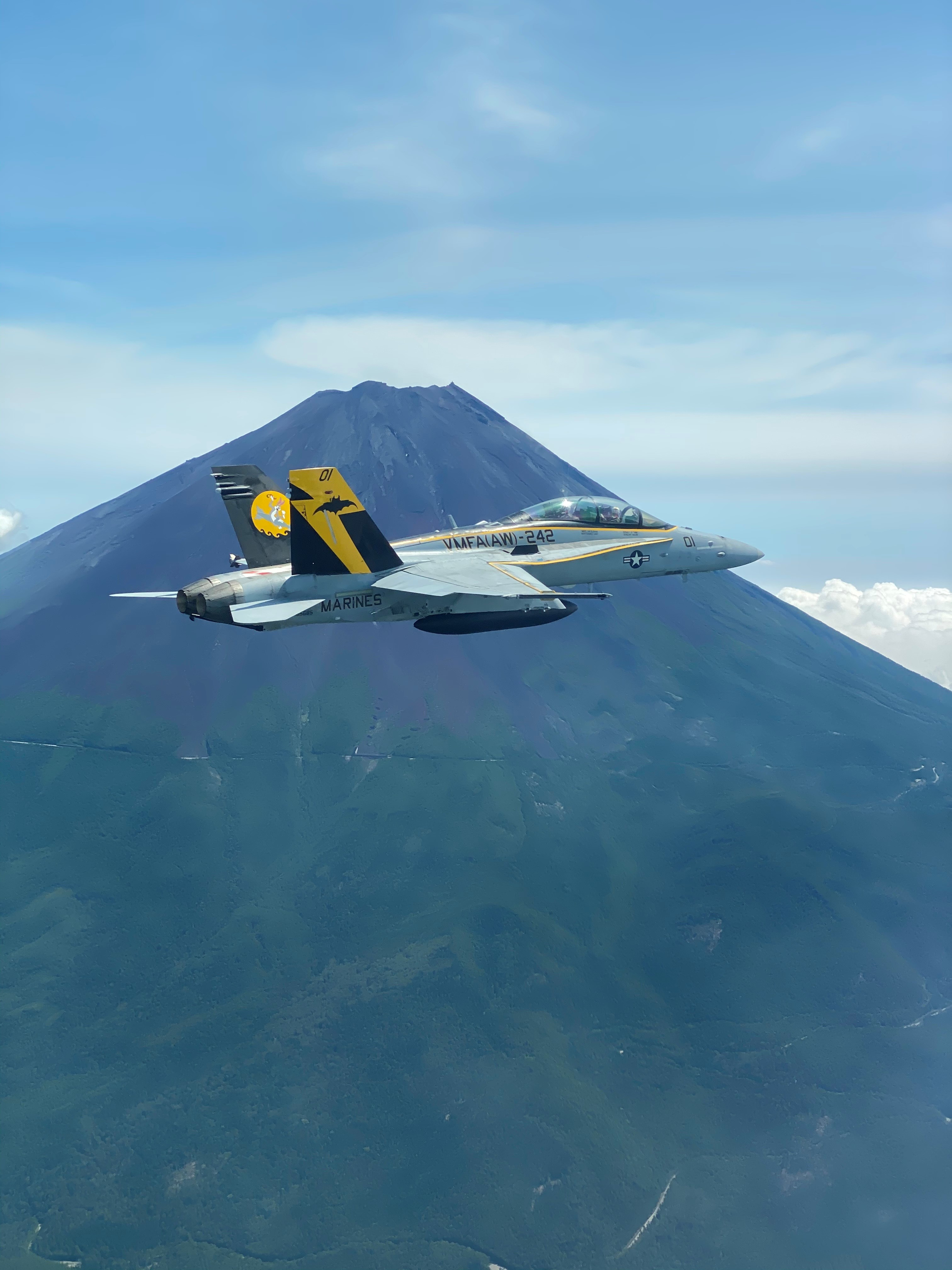

On 16 October 2020, the squadron was re-designated as Marine Fighter Attack Squadron 242 (VMFA-242) after its transition from the F/A-18D Hornet to the F-35B Lightning II. On 3 October 2021, two aircraft from the squadron operated from the flight deck of the Japanese carrier JS Izumo. The aircraft were testing newly completed modifications to the Izumo that allow it to operate F-35s, and it marked the first time since WWII that fixed-wing aircraft have operated off a Japanese warship.

== In popular culture ==
An A-6A Intruder from VMA(AW)-242 was featured in the 1974 film The Disappearance of Flight 412. The aircraft (side number 8) can be seen taxiing for an alert launch. Shots from inside the cockpit show the Bombardier/Navigator (BN) and also the refueling probe. This was another case of multiple aircraft being used for one: A-6 taxiing and flying (inside the cockpit), F-4 Phantom IIs taking off, and F9F Panthers flying (external shots).

VMA(AW)-242 was the subject of a ProPublica investigation, "Faulty Equipment, Lapsed Training, Repeated Warnings: How a Preventable Disaster Killed Six Marines," primarily focussing on a fatal accident in December 2018. The story was part of a package of investigative articles on the Navy and Marines which was awarded the Pulitzer Prize for National Reporting in 2020.

== See also ==
- List of active United States Marine Corps aircraft squadrons
- United States Marine Corps Aviation
