= J. K. Davis =

J. K. Davis may refer to:

- John Kerry Davis (1927–2019), a US Marine Corps four-star general
- John King Davis (1884–1967), an Australian explorer and navigator
