= Marine Aviation Logistics Squadron 12 =

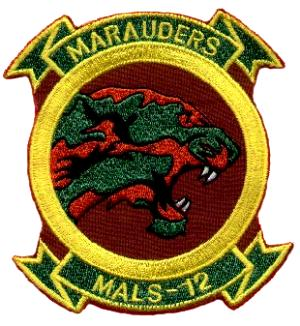
- MALS-12 Insignia
- Active: 1 February 1943 – present
- Country: United States
- Allegiance: United States of America
- Branch: United States Marine Corps
- Type: Logistics
- Role: Aviation logistics support
- Part of: Marine Aircraft Group 12; 1st Marine Aircraft Wing
- Garrison/HQ: Marine Corps Air Station Iwakuni
- Nickname: Marauders
- Engagements: World War II; Korean War; Vietnam War; Operation Desert Storm

Commanders
- Current commander: LtCol Jason M. Constance

Marine Aviation Logistics Squadron 12 (MALS-12) is an aviation logistics support unit of the United States Marine Corps. Known as the "Marauders", they fall under the command of Marine Aircraft Group 12 (MAG-12) and the 1st Marine Aircraft Wing (1st MAW) and are currently based at Marine Corps Air Station Iwakuni.

== Mission ==
Provide aviation logistics expertise, planning and material to MAG-12 and its subordinate tactical aircraft squadrons in order to support operational contingencies, theater security cooperation plans, and training exercises in the Pacific Command area of responsibility.

== History ==
=== World War II ===
Activated as Headquarters and Services Squadron 12 (HQSQ-12) on 1 March 1942, the squadron was assigned in May of that year to the 1st Marine Aircraft Wing and was re-designated on 1 July as Headquarters Squadron 12 (HS-12). Throughout World War II, HS-12 was attached to both the 1st and 2nd Marine Aircraft Wings and participated in numerous campaigns throughout the Northern Solomons, Leyte, Luzon, and the Southern Philippines. Re-deployed to Beiping, China in October 1945, to participate in the post-war occupation of Northern China.

=== Korean War ===
The squadron was called to action on the Korean peninsula at the outbreak of hostilities. Deployed to Wonson, Korea in October 1950, HS-12 distinguished itself in combat during the Battle of Chosin Reservoir, East Central Front, and the Western Front Campaigns until June 1956. In July 1956, the newly re-designated Headquarters and Maintenance Squadron 12 (H&MS-12) re-deployed from Korea to its current home base at MCAS Iwakuni, Japan.

=== Vietnam War ===
In May 1965, H&MS-12 deployed in support of combat operations at Chu Lai and Bien Hoa, Republic of Vietnam. Returning to Iwakuni in February 1970, elements of H&MS-12 returned to Vietnam, participating in combat operations at Bien Hoa from May 1972 to January 1973.

=== 1970s & 1980s ===
From January 1973 until September 1988, H&MS-12 continued to provide support for aviation units assigned to Marine Aircraft Group 12 (MAG-12) and various units throughout the Western Pacific. On 1 October 1988, the squadron was combined with H&MS-15 and re-designated as Marine Aviation Logistics Squadron 12 (MALS-12). During December 1989, MALS-12 deployed a substantial detachment to the Philippines in support of MAG-12 operations during the attempted coup.

=== 1990s ===
In 1990, MALS-12 supported the pre-deployment aircrew training and aircraft grooming of two squadrons in preparation for their deployment to Southwest Asia for participation in Operation Desert Shield and Operation Desert Storm. During June 1993, in concert with the six aircraft AV-8B detachment to the 31st Marine Expeditionary Unit (31st MEU), MALS-12 began the ongoing support to the 31st MEU.

== See also ==
- United States Marine Corps Aviation
- Organization of the United States Marine Corps
- List of United States Marine Corps aviation support squadrons
