= Marine Aircraft Group 12 =

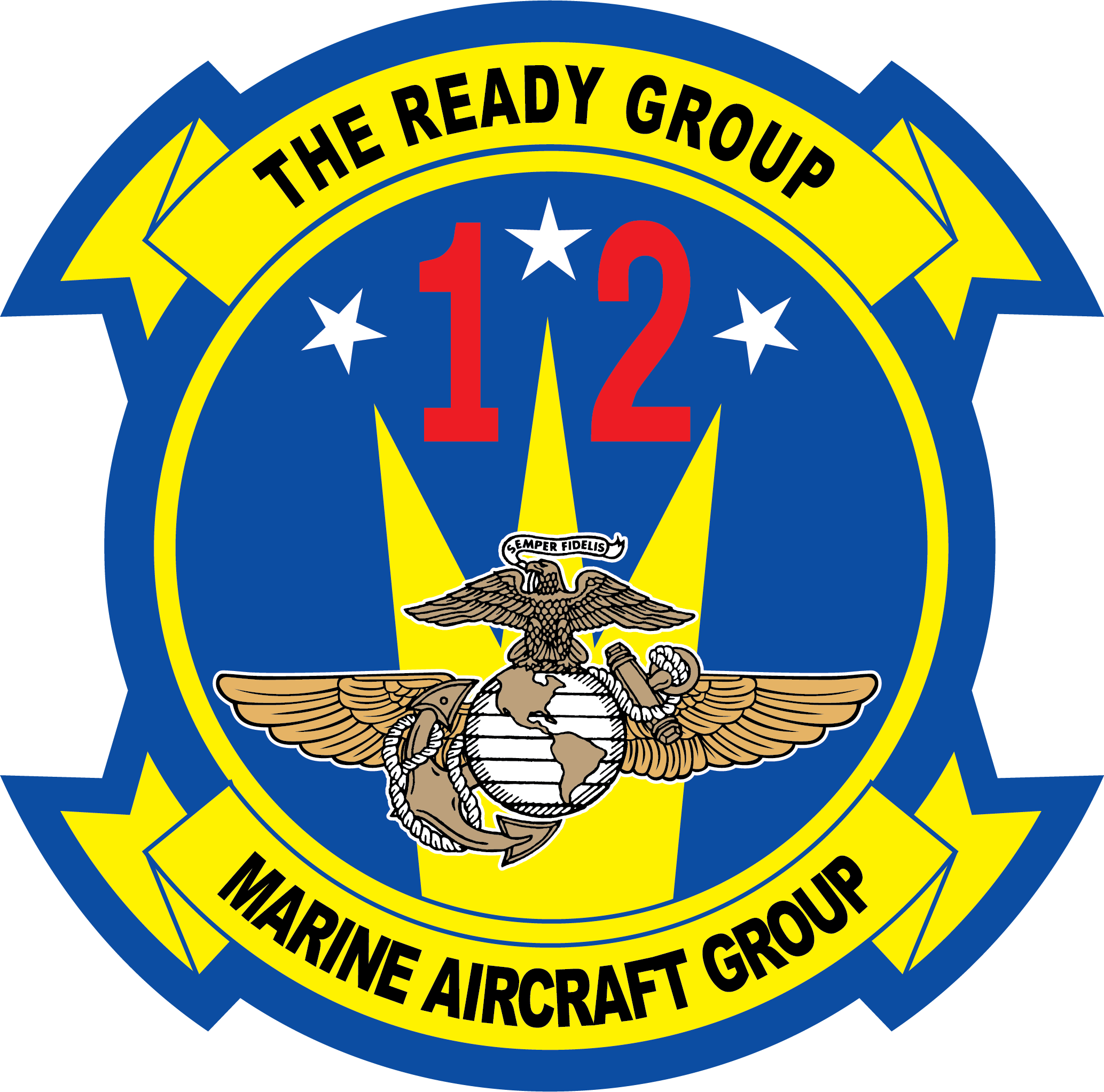
- Active: 1 March 1942 – present
- Country: United States
- Branch: United States Marine Corps
- Type: Fixed Wing Aircraft Group
- Role: Offensive Air Support; Antiair Warfare; Aerial Reconnaissance; Electronic Warfare; Assault Support
- Part of: 1st Marine Aircraft Wing; III Marine Expeditionary Force
- Garrison/HQ: Marine Corps Air Station Iwakuni
- Nickname: The Ready Group
- Engagements: World War II * Philippines campaign (1944–45); Korean War * Attack on the Sui-ho Dam; Vietnam War; Operation Enduring Freedom

Commanders
- Commanding Officer: Col Kyle B. Shoop
- Sergeant Major: SgtMaj R. Carlos Lopez
- Executive Officer: LtCol Daniel V. Jernigan
- Notable commanders: Mark R. Wise; William O. Brice; Vernon M. Guymon; Robert E. Galer; Edward C. Dyer; John P. Condon; Ralph K. Rottet; George S. Bowman Jr.

Marine Aircraft Group 12 (MAG-12) is an active air group of the United States Marine Corps, tasked with providing fighter and assault support aircraft. It is currently part of the 1st Marine Aircraft Wing (1st MAW), itself an integral part of the III Marine Expeditionary Force, and based at MCAS Iwakuni in Japan.

== Mission ==
The mission of Marine Aircraft Group 12, as the tactical air arm of the 1st Marine Aircraft Wing, is to conduct air reconnaissance, electronic warfare, antiair warfare, offensive air support, control of aircraft and missiles, and assault support from advanced bases, expeditionary bases or the sea base supported by organic aviation logistics and aviation ground support logistics as required by III MEF and United States Pacific Command and be prepared to conduct such support and engagement operations as may be directed.

== Subordinate units ==
F-35B Lightning II squadrons:

- VMFA-121
- VMFA-242

Unit Deployment Program squadrons, one stateside-based squadron on a six-month rotational deployment as a part of MAG-12.

- One VMFA squadron (Operates F/A-18C/D, F-35B or F-35C).

KC-130J Aerial Refueler Transport squadrons:

- VMGR-152

Marine Aviation Logistics squadrons:

- MALS-12

Marine Wing Support squadrons:

- MWSS-171

== History ==
=== WW II ===
Marine Aircraft Group 12 was activated at Camp Kearny, San Diego, California, on 1 March 1942. Shortly thereafter, deployed to the Pacific Theater. From December 1942 until cessation of hostilities in late 1945, the Group participated in numerous operations in the Solomon and Philippine Islands supporting the Army, Navy and Marine Corps as well as Philippine guerrilla forces. MAG 12 was brought to the Philippines by the request of Admiral "Bull" Halsey when he said,

I had had under my command in the South Pacific a Marine Air Group which had proved its versatility in everything from fighting to blasting enemy vessels. I knew that the group was now under MacArthur's command, and I knew, too, without understanding why, that when Kenney was not keeping it idle, he was assigning it to missions far below its capacity. Kinkaid's complaint of insufficient air cover prompted me to take a step which was more than a liberty; to a man of meaner spirit than MacArthur's it would have seemed an impertinence. I called these Marines to his attention. He ordered them forward, and within 24 hours of their arrival, they had justified my recommendation.

For such service, the Group earned the Army Distinguished Unit Award and the Navy Unit Citation.

=== Korean War ===
On 20 April 1952, MAG-12 made its home at K-6 Air Base, Pyongtaek. During the war units from MAG-12, except VMA-312 which was on board the USS Bataan (CVL-29), came under the control of the Air Force's Fifth Air Force. Through the end of the Korean War, the group participated successfully in numerous operations and accumulated over 80,000 effective combat sorties against enemy troops, installations, vehicles and countless other vital targets. A second Navy Unit citation was awarded for its Korean War service.

=== Post Korea and Vietnam War ===
During 1956, after nearly 6 years in Korea, MAG-12 was withdrawn to Marine Corps Air Station Iwakuni, Japan, and remained there conducting close air support for Fleet Marine Forces in the Western Pacific until 1965.

In May 1965, MAG-12 deployed to Chu Lai, Vietnam, to support Marine infantry and other allied forces in their engagements against the Viet Cong and the North Vietnamese Army units. The Group participated in many large operations, including the recapture of Hue City and the relief of besieged units at Khe Sanh. Two more Navy Unit Citations were received as a result of the Group's contribution to the Vietnam War effort. After almost 5 years of combat, MAG-12 was withdrawn from the Republic of Vietnam in February 1970, and reestablished at MCAS Iwakuni, Japan.

MAG-12's stay in Japan, though, was short. In May 1972, MAG-12 again deployed to Vietnam and conducted combat operations from Bien Hoa Air Base until finally withdrawing from the war on 29 January 1973 where they were the last American combat aviation unit still in country. MAG-12 then returned to MCAS Iwakuni, where it remains today.

=== Post Vietnam ===
From this base, MAG-12 has conducted numerous operations throughout the WESTPAC area and participated in hundreds of joint service training exercises, continually honing its combat skills.

== See also ==
- United States Marine Corps Aviation
- List of United States Marine Corps aircraft groups
- List of United States Marine Corps aircraft squadrons
