= Marine Corps Air Station Iwakuni =

American–Japanese air base in Yamaguchi, Japan

- 岩国飛行場
- Iwakuni, Yamaguchi Prefecture in Japan
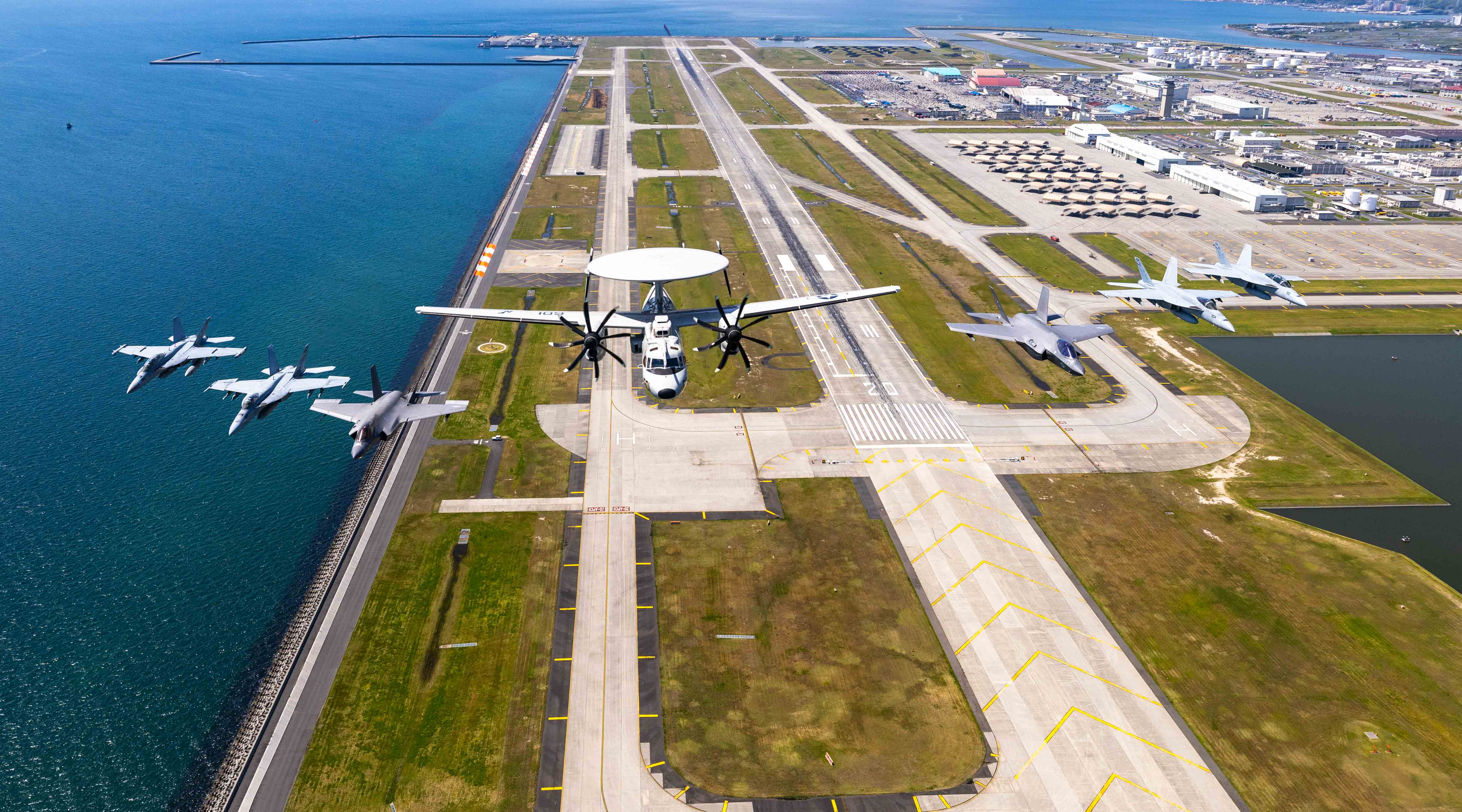
- Carrier Air Wing Five aircraft fly over MCAS Iwakuni in 2025.

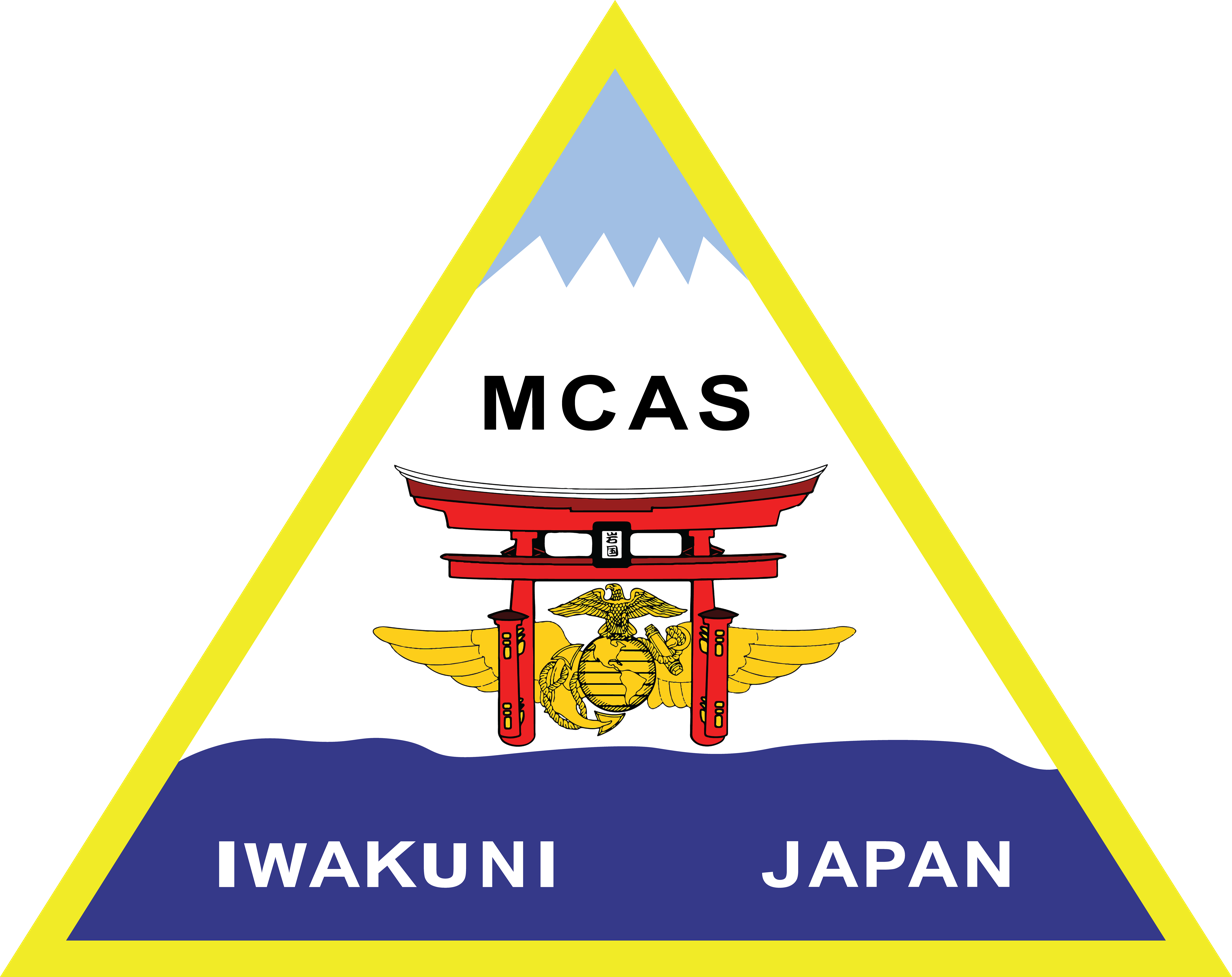

Site information
- Type: Marine Corps Air Station
- Owner: Various (leased by Government of Japan and made available to the US)
- Operator: US Marine Corps (USMC); US Air Force (USAF); US Navy (USN); Japan Maritime Self-Defense Force (JMSDF)
- Controlled by: Marine Corps Installations Pacific (MCIPAC)
- Condition: Operational
- Website: www.mcasiwakuni.marines.mil

Location
- Location in Japan MCAS Iwakuni (Japan)
- Coordinates: 34°08′42″N 132°14′39″E

Site history
- Built: 1940
- In use: 1940 – present

Garrison information
- Current commander: Colonel Kenneth K. Rossman
- Past commanders: Colonel Richard M. Rusnok, Jr.
- Garrison: Marine Aircraft Group 12 (USMC); Carrier Air Wing 5 (USN); Fleet Air Wing 31 (JMSDF)

Airfield information
- Identifiers: IATA: IWK, ICAO: RJOI, WMO: 477640
- Elevation: 3 metres (10 ft) AMSL
Runways
Direction	Length and surface
02/20	2,440 metres (8,005 ft) Concrete
- Other airfield facilities: 1x seaplane ramp and 1x V/STOL pad
- Airfield shared with Iwakuni Kintaikyo Airport. Source: Japanese AIP at AIS Japan

Marine Corps Air Station Iwakuni or MCAS Iwakuni (岩国飛行場, Iwakuni hikōjō) (IATA: IWK, ICAO: RJOI) is a joint Japan Maritime Self-Defense Forces and United States Marine Corps air station located in the Nishiki river delta, 1.3 NM (2.4 km; 1.5 mi) southeast of Iwakuni Station in the city of Iwakuni, Yamaguchi Prefecture, Japan.

== History ==
The Japanese government bought a large portion of what is today MCAS Iwakuni in 1938, with the view of establishing a naval air station. They commissioned the new base on 8 July 1940. When World War II started, the Iwakuni Air Station was used as a training and defense base. The station housed 96 trainers and 150 Zero fighter planes on the airstrip. In September 1943, a branch of the Etajima Naval Academy was established here, with approximately 1,000 cadets undergoing training in the Basic, Junior, and Senior Officer's schools at any one time. American B-29's bombed Iwakuni in May and August 1945, concentrating on the oil refinery and Rail Transport Office or train station areas. The last air raid took place just a day before the war was brought to a close.

The first allies to reach Iwakuni at the war's end were a group of U.S. Marines who had signed papers ending the conflict for the Japanese air base. After the end of World War II, various military forces from the United States, Britain, Australia, and New Zealand occupied the base and it was repaired by No. 5 Airfield Construction Squadron RAAF and designated a Royal Australian Air Force Base in 1948. The Americans first occupied the base in 1950 to use it as a springboard for aircraft heading to the Korean War. In 1952, the base officially became a United States military base.

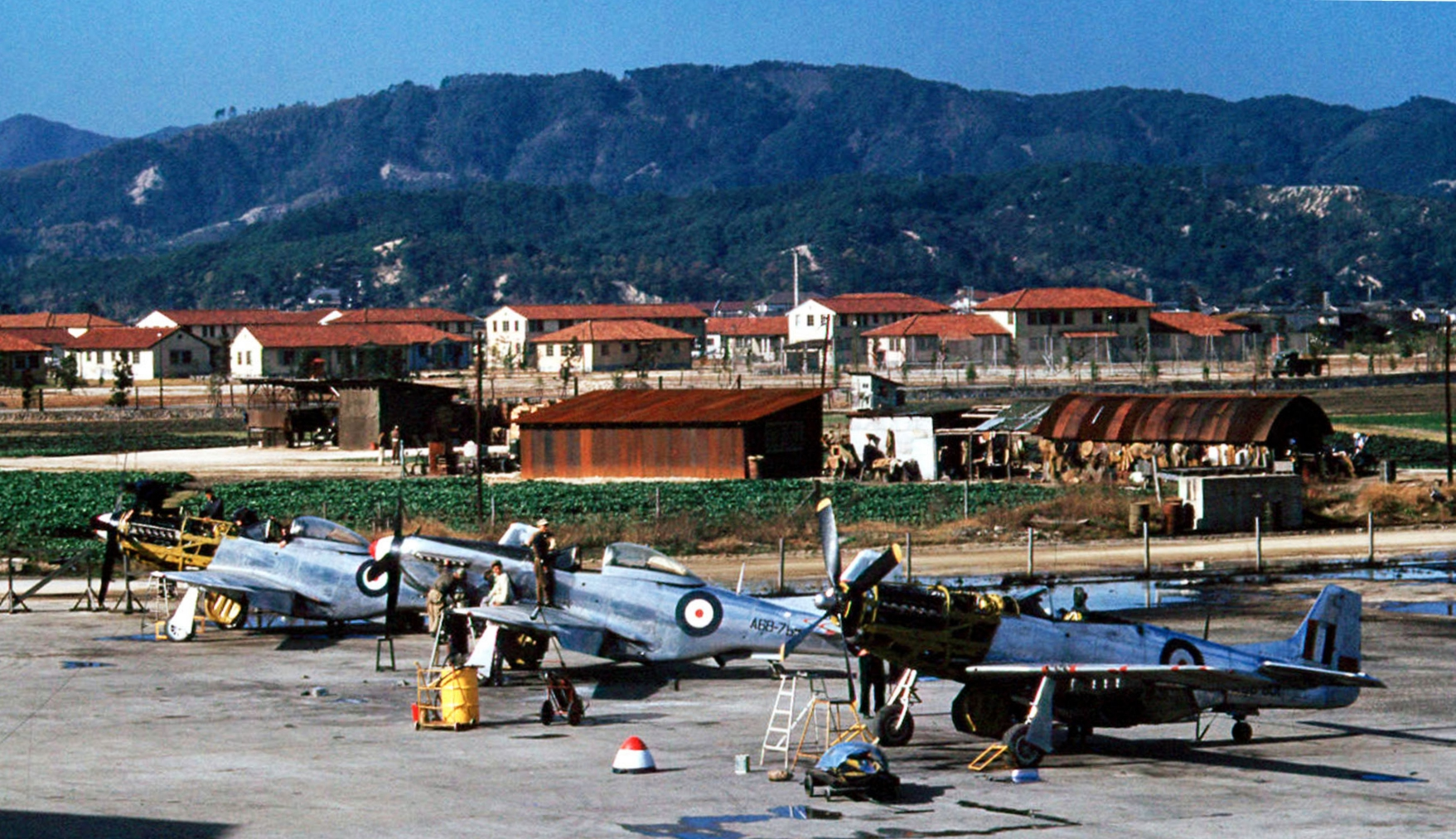
F-51Ds of RAAF No. 77 Squadron in maintenance at Iwakuni Airfield, June 1950.

Iwakuni had scheduled international service by private airlines from 1952 to 1964, during which time it had the IATA airport code IWJ. This code was later reassigned to Iwami Airport in neighboring Shimane Prefecture.

Nuclear weapons were moved from Okinawa to the base for storage during a brief period in 1966. When U.S. ambassador to Japan Edwin O. Reischauer learned of the presence of the weapons, which was a violation of the Treaty of Mutual Cooperation and Security between the United States and Japan, he told the United States Department of State that if the weapons were not removed within 90 days he would resign and go public with the information. The weapons were removed shortly thereafter, and their presence at the base did not become publicly known until 2010.

It is currently home to around 10,000 United States Marines, sailors, and family members. The base is detailed for Marine pilot training and air patrol, using F/A-18 Hornet fighter-attack aircraft among others in compliance with the Treaty of Mutual Cooperation and Security obligations to protect Japan. MCAS Iwakuni is also shared with the Japanese Maritime Self Defense Force. MCAS Iwakuni is home to a Department of Defense school, Matthew C. Perry (Elementary, Middle School, and High School).

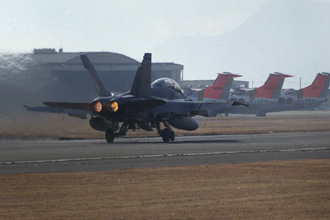
USMC F/A-18D takes off from MCAS Iwakuni in December 2005

A new off-shore runway opened at the base on 30 May 2010. The new runway is 2,440 meters in length.

On 22 November 2017, a C-2A Greyhound cargo plane with 11 crew and passengers aboard crashed southeast of Okinawa after departing the base for the aircraft carrier USS Ronald Reagan. Eight of the 11 on board were rescued.

On 6 December 2018, a F/A-18D Hornet (callsign "Profane 12") belonging to VMFA(AW)-242 collided mid-air with a KC-130 (callsign "Sumo 41") from VMGR-152 during a nighttime training exercise. The crew of Sumo 41 were killed in the collision along with the pilot of Profane 12. The co-pilot of Profane 12 was rescued by JMSDF Search & Rescue in Japanese waters. An investigation into the accident was led by the Marine Corps. ProPublica later conducted their independent investigation after finding the Marine Corps's initial results to be inaccurate.

=== USN Carrier Air Wing 5 relocation to MCAS Iwakuni ===
Since at least 2005 there had been plans to relocate Carrier Air Wing Five's fixed wing aircraft from Naval Air Facility Atsugi in Kanagawa Prefecture to Iwakuni. Yamaguchi governor Sekinari Nii said there was "no way" Yamaguchi prefecture would accept this. In 2006 Iwakuni voters rejected the plan in a plebiscite and Iwakuni mayor Katsusuke Ihara urged Tokyo to drop the plan. In 2007 the Japanese government passed legislation to prepare for the relocation of US Forces in Japan including subsidies for local affected areas.

The move was planned to have been done in 2014, but after construction delays the move was delayed by three years, to 2017.

The move did not include the wing's two helicopter squadrons which remain based at NAF Atsugi. The first CVW-5 squadron, VAW-125 flying the E-2D Hawkeye arrived in January 2017. The Boeing E/A-18G Growlers of VAQ-141 "Shadowhawks" completed relocation in January, 2018. By March 2018, all fixed wing aircraft of Carrier Air Wing 5 had completed relocation from NAF Atsugi.

=== USMC F-35B aircraft ===
The first aircraft of Marine Fighter Attack Squadron 121 "Green Knights" (VMFA-121) arrived on 18 January 2017. This became the first forward deployed F-35B Lightning II squadron in the United States Marine Corps. They have since flown show of force sorties against North Korea.

== Role and operations ==
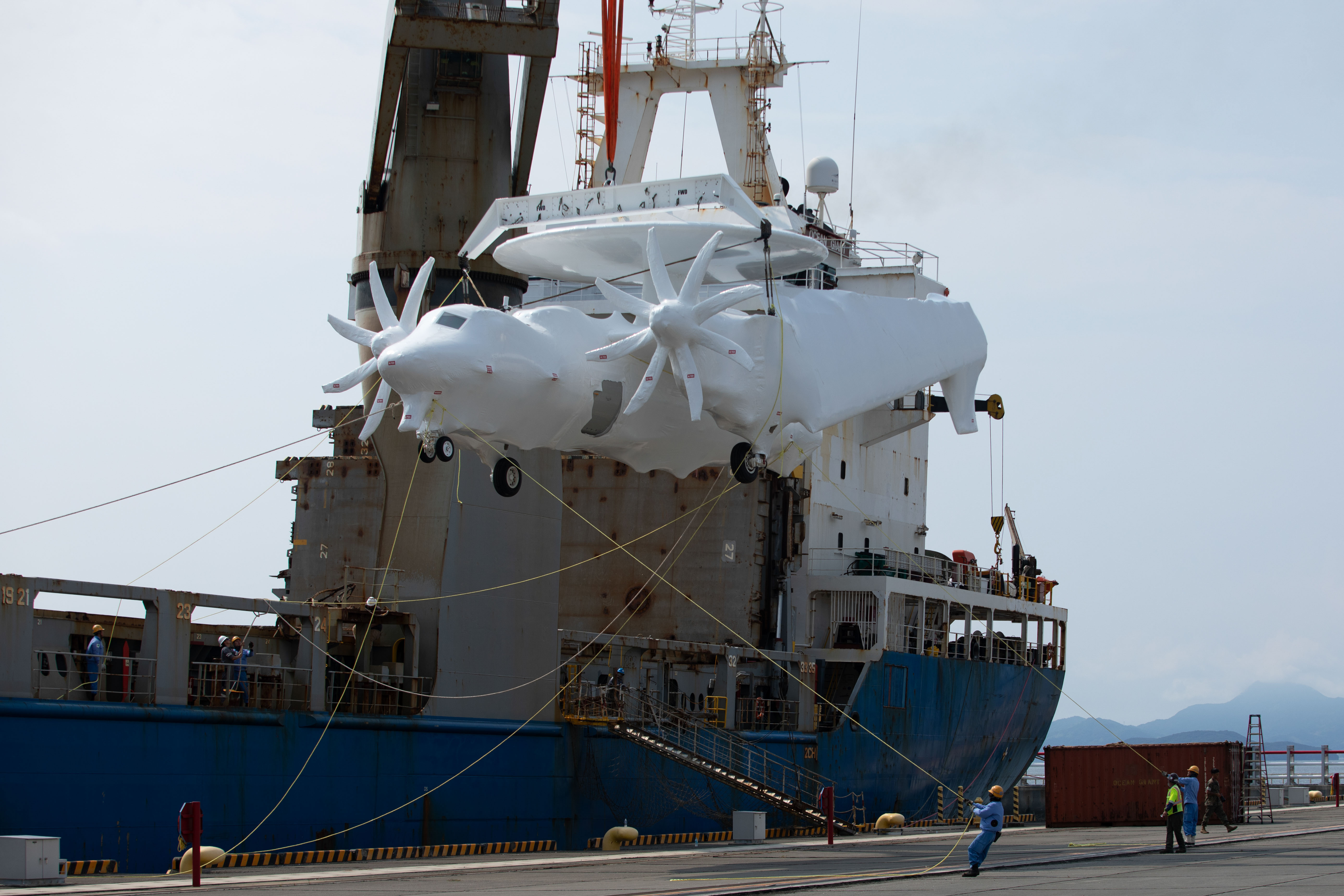
A vehicle carrier ship offloads an E-2D Advanced Hawkeye at the MCAS Iwakuni harbor (2025)

MCAS Iwakuni supports transportation of military assets between sea and shore through use of its co-located harbor and airfield.

=== US Marine Corps ===
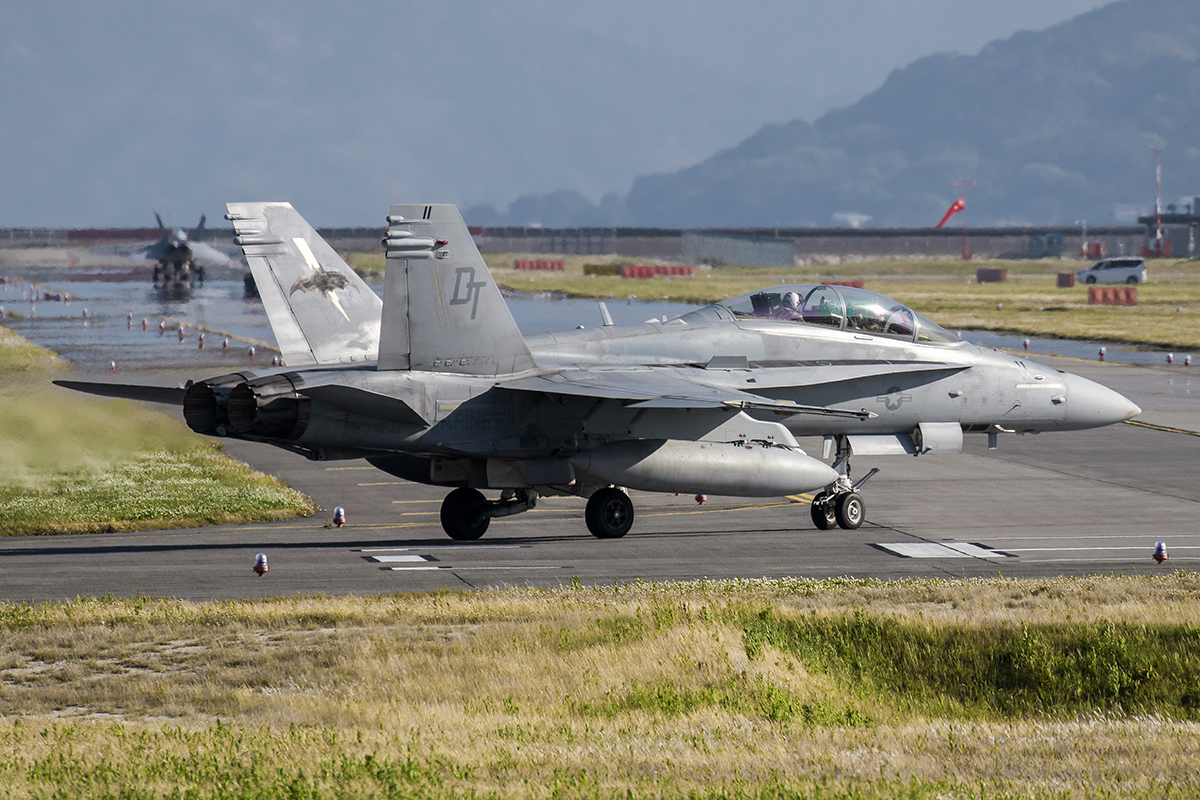
Taxiing F/A-18D Hornet of VMFA(AW)-242 at Marine Corps Air Station Iwakuni (2018)

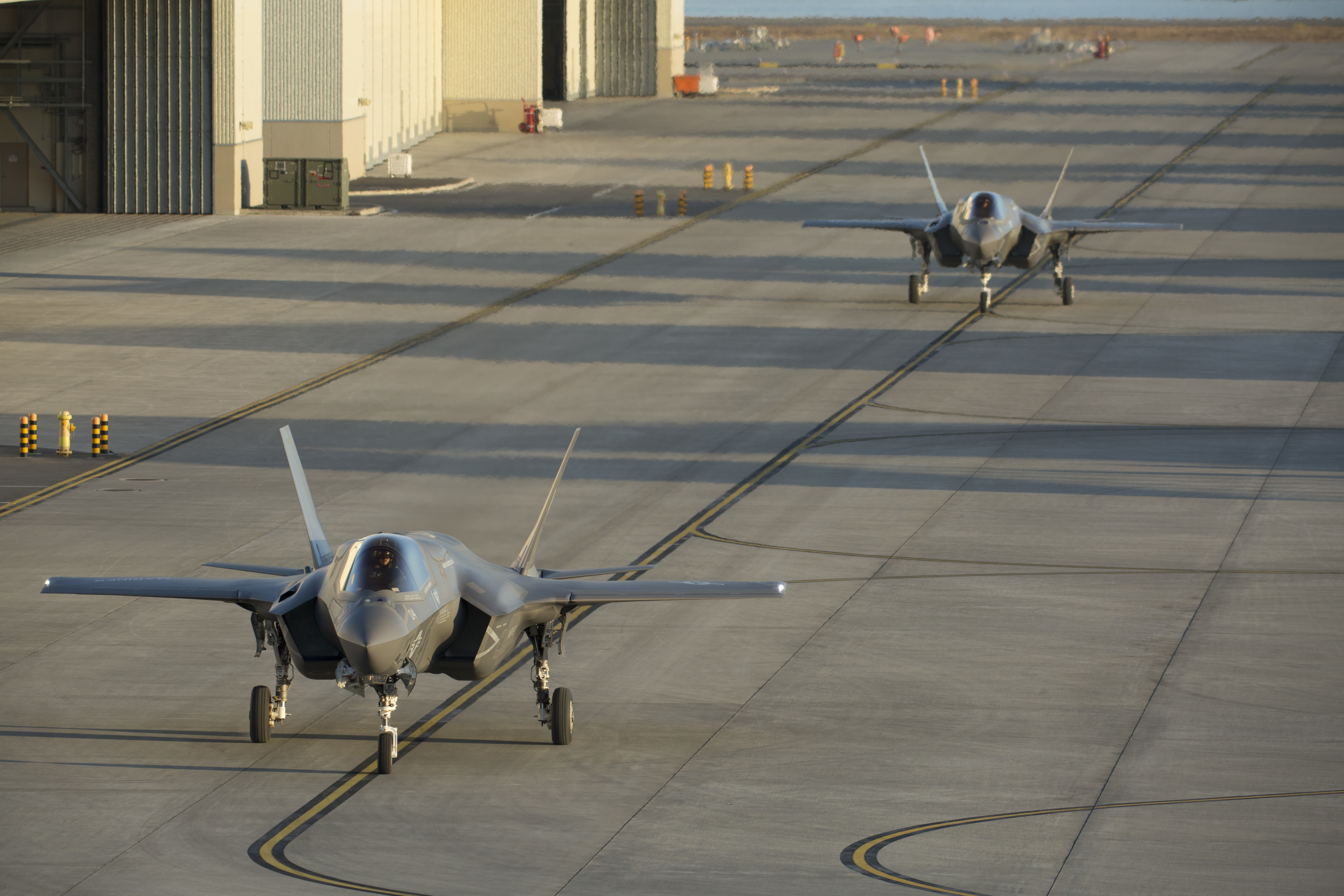
F-35B Lightning IIs with Marine Fighter Attack Squadron (VMFA) 121, taxi to the runway at Marine Corps Air Station Iwakuni

Marine Aircraft Group 12 (MAG-12) contains the rotary and fixed wing aircraft assets of Marine Corps Air Station Iwakuni. MAG-12 is home to three flying squadrons, an aviation logistics squadron, and a ground support squadron.

- VMFA-242 "Bats"— one of two permanent forward deployed Marine F-35B Lightning II fighter squadrons.
- VMFA-121 "Green Knights"- the other permanent forward deployed Marine F-35B Lightning II fighter squadron.
- VMGR-152 "Sumos" — moved here from MCAS Futenma in Okinawa commencing in June 2014 with their 15 KC-130J Super Hercules.
- Marine Aviation Logistics Squadron 12 (MALS-12) provides logistics support, guidance, and direction to MAG-12 and other commands aboard the Station. Click on the link to the right for more information on the Marauders.
- Marine Wing Support Squadron 171 (MWSS-171) provides essential Aviation Ground Support to the Station
- Headquarters and Headquarters Squadron (H&HS) provides administrative support and conducts training in general military skills for more than 800 Marines and sailors aboard MCAS Iwakuni.
- Combat Logistics Company 36 (CLC-36) Provides logistic support to MWSS-171 and MAG 12.

=== US Air Force ===
The 374th Communications Squadron provides communications support to H&HS, MAG-12, Branch Medical Clinic Iwakuni, Army Corps of Engineers, and the JMSDF.

== Tenant Squadrons USMC/USN ==
Flying units based at MCAS Iwakuni.

Insignia	Squadron	Code	Callsign/Nickname	Assigned Aircraft	Operational Assignment
	Strike Fighter Squadron 147	VFA-147	Argonauts	F-35C Lightning II	Carrier Air Wing Five
	Strike Fighter Squadron 195	VFA-195	Dambusters	F/A-18E Super Hornet	Carrier Air Wing Five
	Strike Fighter Squadron 27	VFA-27	Royal Maces	F/A-18E Super Hornet	Carrier Air Wing Five
	Strike Fighter Squadron 102	VFA-102	Diamondbacks	F/A-18F Super Hornet	Carrier Air Wing Five
	Electronic Attack Squadron 141	VAQ-141	Shadowhawks	E/A-18G Growler	Carrier Air Wing Five
	Airborne Command and Control Squadron 125	VAW-125	Tigertails	E-2D Advanced Hawkeye	Carrier Air Wing Five
	Marine Fighter Attack Squadron 121	VMFA-121	Green Knights	F-35B Lightning II	1st Marine Aircraft Wing (1st MAW)
	Marine Fighter Attack Squadron 242	VMFA-242	Bats	F-35B Lightning II	1st Marine Aircraft Wing (1st MAW)
	Marine Aerial Refueler Transport Squadron 152	VMGR-152	Sumos	KC-130J Hercules	1st Marine Aircraft Wing (1st MAW)

== Based units ==
Flying and notable non-flying units based at MCAS Iwakuni.

=== United States Marine Corps ===
Marine Corps Installations – Pacific

- Headquarters and Headquarters Squadron – UC-12W Huron

1st Marine Aircraft Wing

- Marine Aircraft Group 12
  - Marine Aerial Refueler Transport Squadron 152 (VMGR-152) – KC-130J Super Hercules
  - Marine Fighter Attack Squadron 242 (VMFA-242) – F-35B Lightning II
  - Marine Aviation Logistics Squadron 12 (MALS-12)
  - Marine Fighter Attack Squadron 121 (VMFA-121) – F-35B Lightning II
  - Marine Wing Support Squadron 171 (MWSS-171)

3rd Marine Logistics Group

- Combat Logistics Regiment 35
  - Combat Logistics Company 36 (CLC-36)

=== United States Air Force ===
Pacific Air Forces (PACAF)

- Fifth Air Force
  - 374th Airlift Wing
    - 374th Mission Support Group
      - 374th Communications Squadron
        - Operating Location Bravo

=== United States Navy ===
US Pacific Fleet

- Naval Air Force Pacific
  - Helicopter Sea Combat Squadron 25 (HSC-25)
    - Detachment 6 – MH-60S Seahawk
  - Carrier Air Wing Five (CVW-5)
    - Carrier Airborne Early Warning Squadron 125 (VAW-125) – E-2D Hawkeye
    - Fleet Logistics Support Squadron Composite 40 (VRC-40)
      - Detachment 5 – C-2A Greyhound
    - Electronic Attack Squadron 141 (VAQ-141) – EA-18G Growler
    - Strike Fighter Squadron 27 (VFA-27) – F/A-18E Super Hornet
    - Strike Fighter Squadron 102 (VFA-102) – F/A-18F Super Hornet
    - Strike Fighter Squadron 147 (VFA-147) – F-35C Lightning II
    - Strike Fighter Squadron 195 (VFA-195) – F/A-18E Super Hornet

=== Japan Maritime Self-Defense Force ===
Fleet Air Force

- Fleet Air Wing 31
  - Air Patrol Squadron 71 – US-1A and US-2
  - Air Patrol Squadron 81 – EP-3 and OP-3C
  - Air Patrol Squadron 91 – UP-3D and U-36A
  - Mine Countermeasures Helicopter Squadron 111 – MCH-101

== Commercial services ==
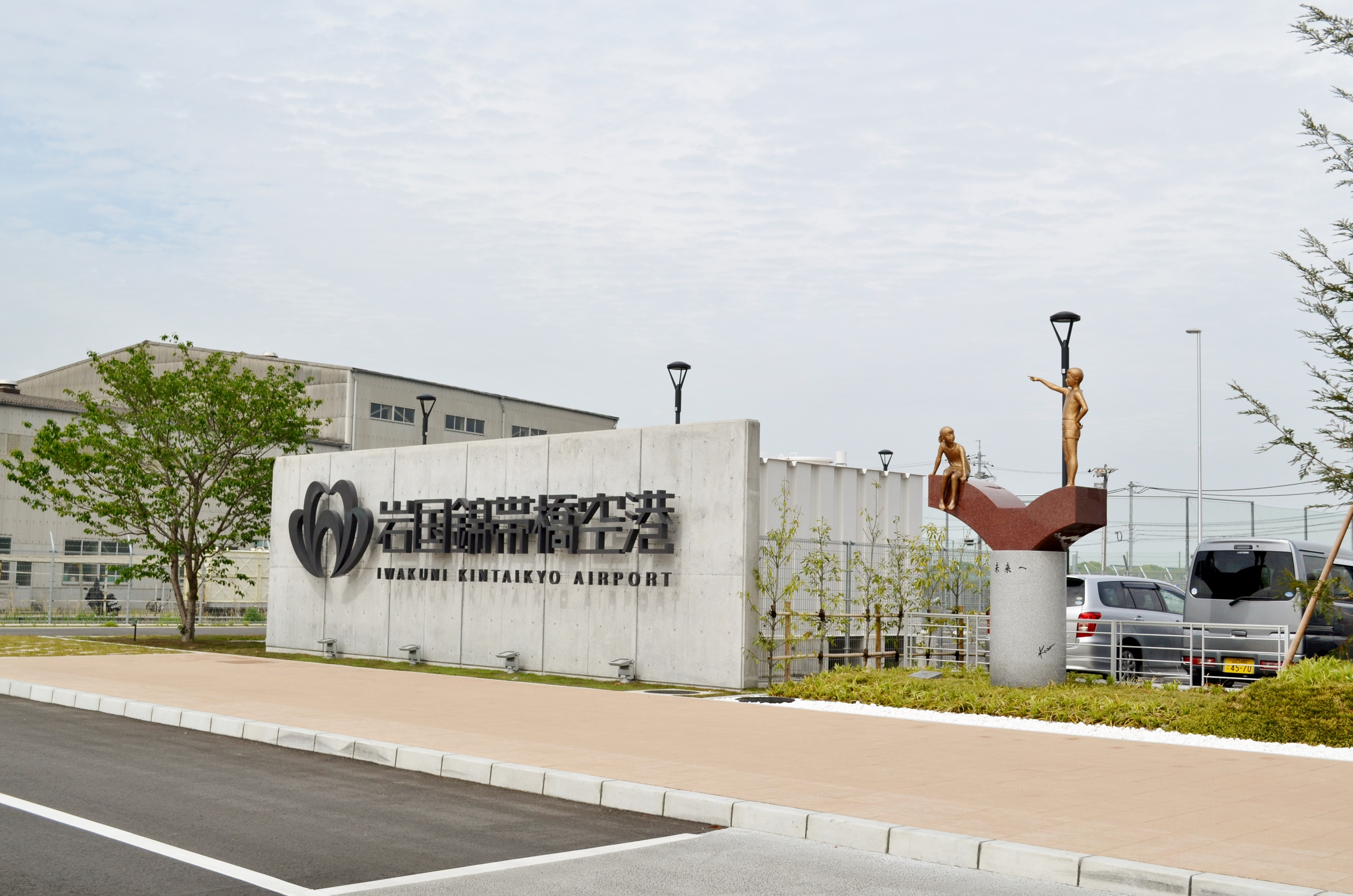
Iwakuni Kintaikyo Airport

Regular commercial service started from 13 December 2012 with a civilian airport terminal built to accommodate commercial flights. It was initially projected that up to 430,000 passengers would use the airport each year, and in the first seven months of operations the airport handled over 200,000 passengers, with average load factors between Iwakuni and Tokyo exceeding 70% during June 2013.

Since the IATA airport code IWJ, formerly assigned to Iwakuni, was reassigned to Iwami Airport, a new IATA code of IWK was assigned to Iwakuni. The inaugural flight was operated by All Nippon Airways from Haneda Airport. Iwakuni Airport is called by its official nickname "Iwakuni Kintaikyo Airport", named after the Kintaikyo bridge near the airport. In the future, the airport plans to serve international flights to China and South Korea as well as more cities within Japan. However, these plans were never made as nearby Hiroshima Airport and Matsuyama Airport already served dozens of these flights.

=== Airlines and destinations ===
Airlines	Destinations
All Nippon Airways	Tokyo–Haneda
ANA Wings	Naha, Tokyo–Haneda

== Friendship Day ==
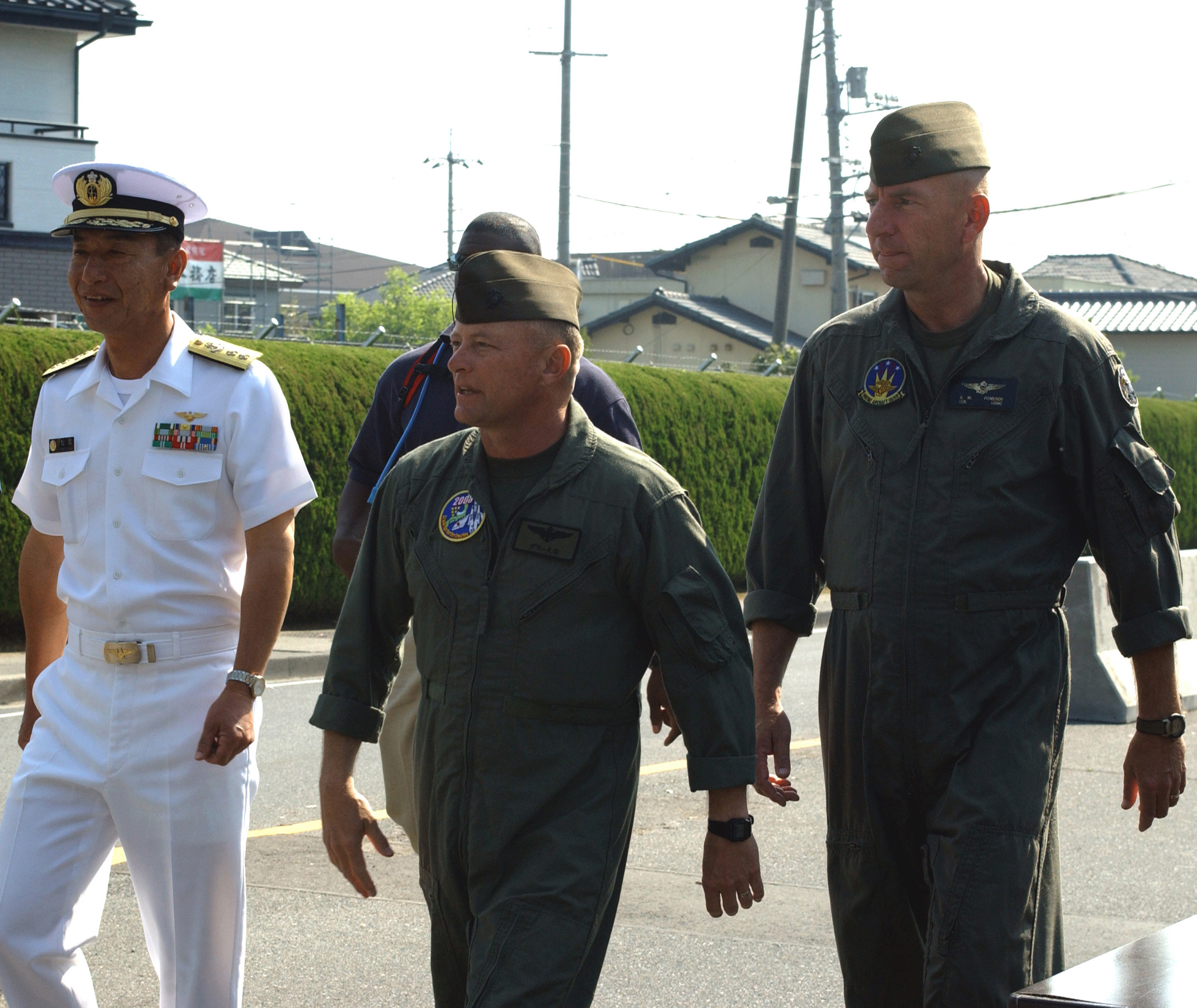
JSDAF Major General Matuoka Sadayosi and USMC Colonels Dave Darrah and Stephen Pomeroy walk towards MCAS Iwakuni front gate for the opening ceremonies of Friendship Day 2003

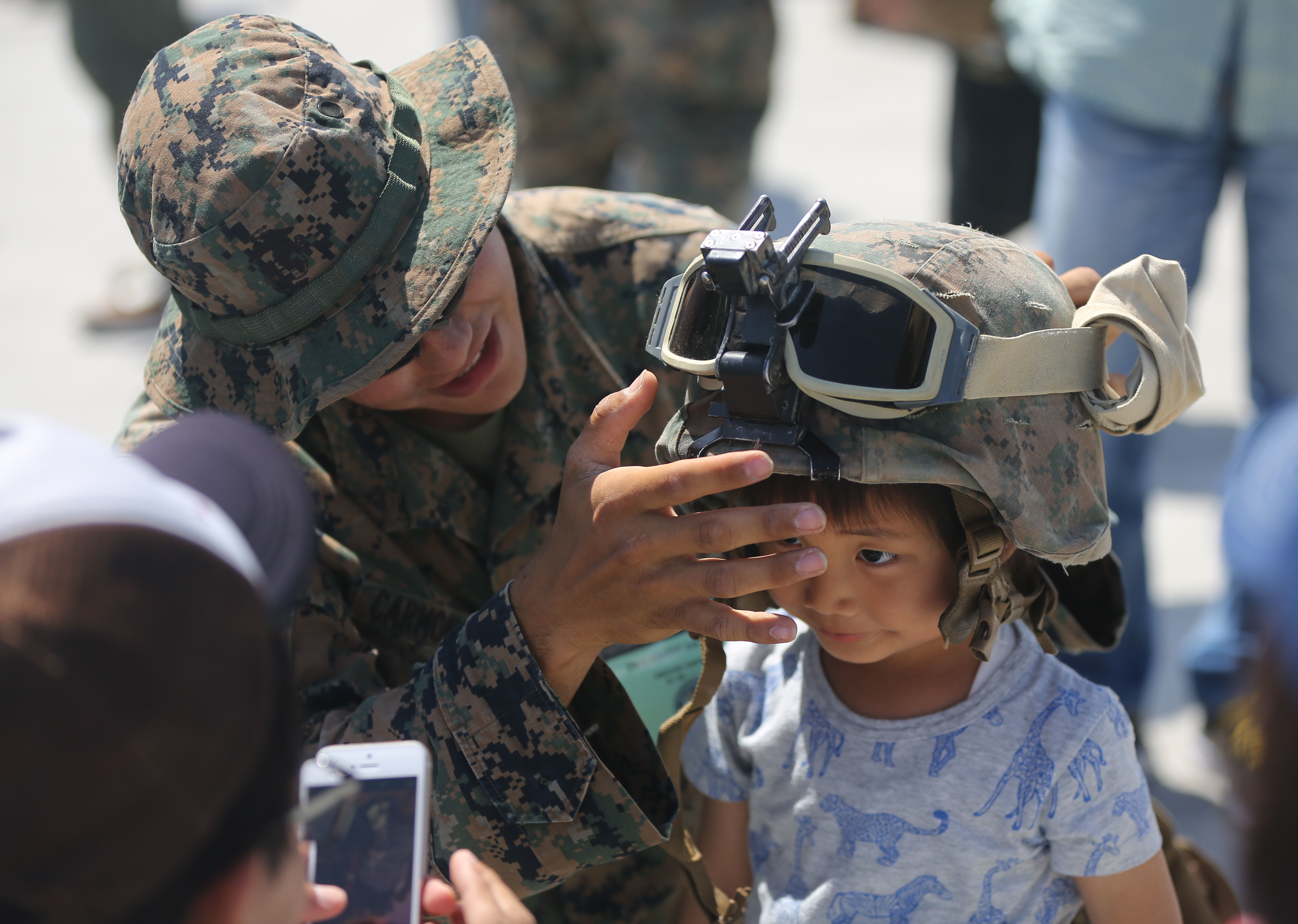
A child tries on a Kevlar helmet during the Marine Corps Air Station Iwakuni Friendship Day 2016 Air Show, 5 May 2016.

Every year on 5 May, Japanese nationals and U.S. service members, government employees and their families officially celebrate their long-standing friendship by opening the gates of MCAS Iwakuni for one of Japan's largest air shows dedicated to enhancing the friendship of the two nations. The event, entitled Friendship Day, hosts an average 250,000 visitors who travel from all over Japan.

== See also ==
- List of United States Marine Corps installations
- List of airports in Japan
