= 1st Marine Aircraft Wing =

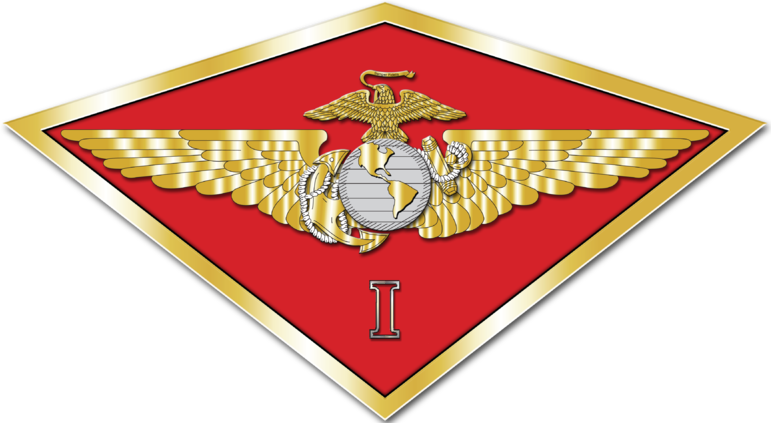
- 1st MAW insignia
- Active: 7 July 1941 - present
- Country: United States
- Branch: United States Marine Corps
- Type: Marine Aircraft Wing
- Role: Conduct air operations in support of the Fleet Marine Forces
- Part of: III Marine Expeditionary Force
- Garrison/HQ: Camp Foster
- Nickname: 1st MAW
- Engagements: World War II; Battle of Guadalcanal; Philippines campaign (1944–45); Korean War; Vietnam War; Operation Enduring Freedom

Commanders
- Commanding General: MGen Simon M. Doran
- Assistant Wing Commander: BGen Douglas C. Sanders
- Notable commanders: LtGen Louis E. Woods; Gen Roy S. Geiger; LtGen John F. Goodman; LtGen Albert D. Cooley

Insignia
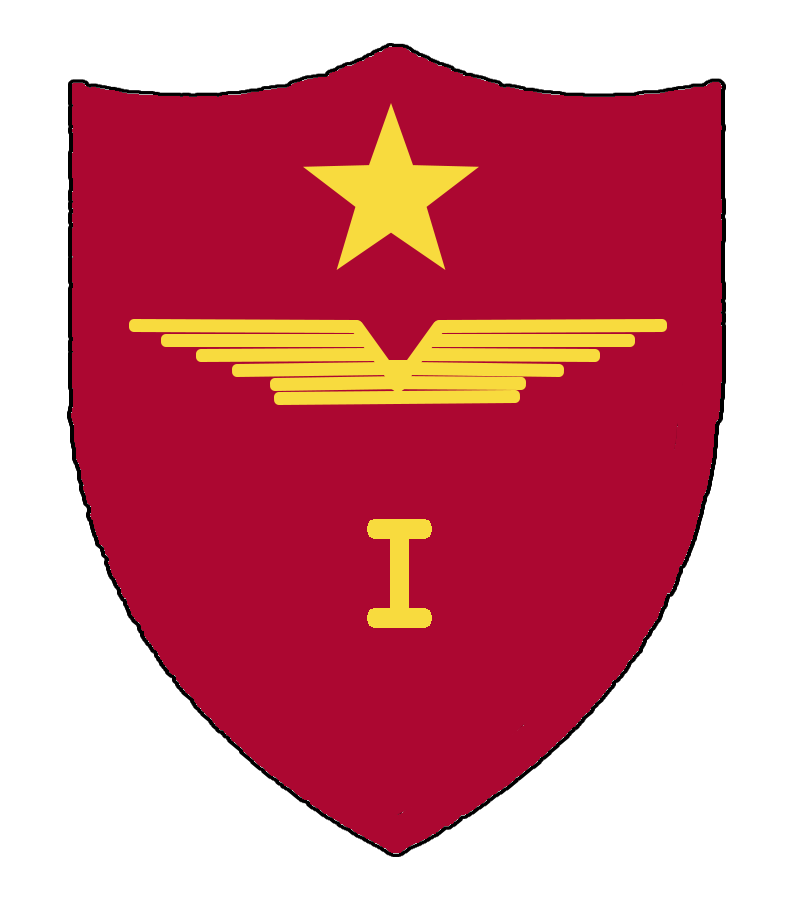
- Early WWII 1st MAW Insignia

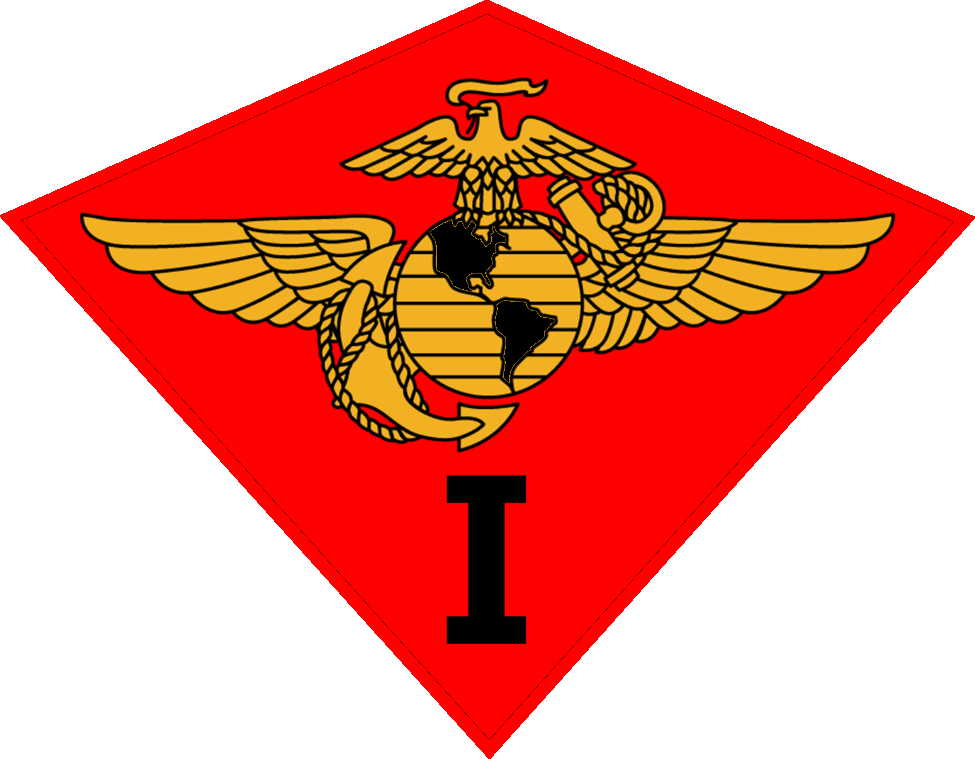
- Late WWII 1st MAW Insignia

The 1st Marine Aircraft Wing is an aviation unit of the United States Marine Corps that serves as the Aviation Combat Element of the III Marine Expeditionary Force. The wing is headquartered at Camp Foster on the island of Okinawa, Japan. Activated in 1940, the wing has seen heavy combat operations during World War II, the Korean War, and the Vietnam War.

== Mission ==
Conduct air operations in support of the Fleet Marine Forces to include offensive air support, antiair warfare, assault support, aerial reconnaissance including active and passive electronic countermeasures (ECM), and control of aircraft and missiles. As a collateral function, the Wing may participate as an integral component of Naval Aviation in the execution of such other Navy functions as the Fleet Commander may direct.

== Organization ==
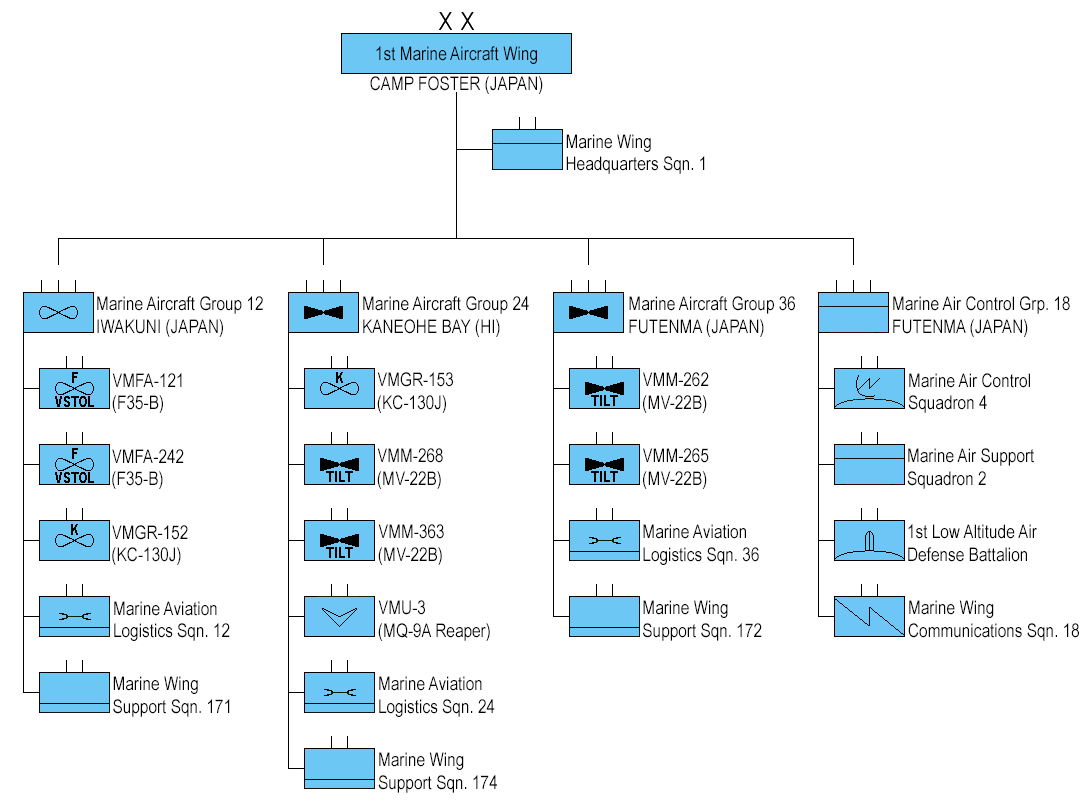
1st Marine Aircraft Wing organization as of May 2026 (click to enlarge)

As of May 2026 the 1st Marine Aircraft Wing consists of four subordinate groups, a headquarters squadron and a liaison unit:

- 1st Marine Aircraft Wing, at Camp Foster (Japan)
  - Marine Wing Headquarters Squadron 1 (MWHS-1), at Camp Foster
  - Marine Wing Liaison Kadena (MWLK), at Kadena Air Base (Japan)
  - Marine Aircraft Group 12 (MAG-12), at Marine Corps Air Station Iwakuni (Japan)
  - Marine Aircraft Group 24 (MAG-24), at Marine Corps Air Station Kaneohe Bay (Hawaii)
  - Marine Aircraft Group 36 (MAG-36), at Marine Corps Air Station Futenma (Japan)
  - Marine Air Control Group 18 (MACG-18), at Marine Corps Air Station Futenma (Japan)

== History ==
=== World War II ===
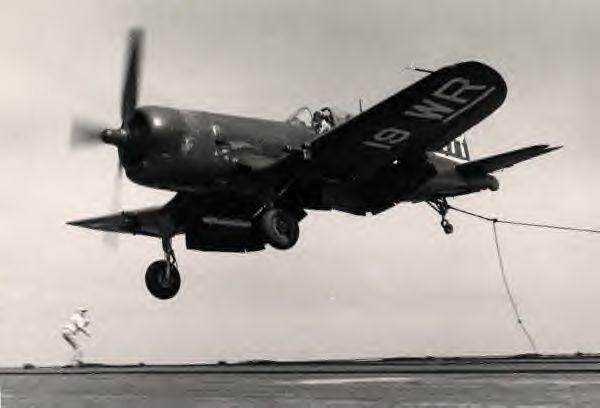
Marine F4U

In late 1940, Congress authorized a naval air fleet of fifteen thousand aircraft. The Marine Corps was allotted a percentage of these planes to be formed into 2 air wings with 32 operational squadrons. On the advice of Navy and Marine advisors returning from observing the war in Europe these numbers were doubled very soon after. It was under this expansion program that the 1st Marine Aircraft Wing was activated at Marine Corps Base Quantico, Virginia, on 7 July 1941. The First Marine Aircraft Group which was the largest east coast aviation unit in the Marines at the time, became its first component. Although a new wing, it is considered an unofficial descendant of the Northern Bombing Group of World War I.

Following the attacks on Pearl Harbor, the wing transferred to Naval Air Station San Diego, California, on 10 December 1941, and then to Camp Kearny on 31 December. The first deployment for 1st MAW came in August 1942 when forward elements of the Wing arrived on Guadalcanal and made up the Cactus Air Force supporting the 1st Marine Division during the Battle of Guadalcanal.

=== Korean War ===
At the beginning of the Korean War, the initial deployment of Marines was a provisional brigade activated on 7 July 1950 — the 1st Provisional Marine Brigade — formed from the 1st Marine Division and the 1st Marine Aircraft Wing. Its core consisted of two units — a regimental combat team from the 5th Marine Regiment and Marine Aircraft Group 33 (MAG-33). Their job was to provide close air support, resupply, and Medevac for Marine ground forces.

In late-June 1952, 75 aircraft from 1st MAW participated in the attack on the Sui-ho Dam which were strikes aimed at the hydroelectric plants in North Korea. The Wing's Chief of Staff Frank Schwable was shot down in July 1952 and while a prisoner of war confessed to having participated in germ warfare. He was eventually cleared of all charges, but his case prompted a review of training and expectations of prisoners-of-war.

Two 1st MAW aircraft groups, MAG-33 and MAG-12, and the 1st Antiaircraft Artillery Gun Battalion served during the course of the war. The wing flew 127,496 sorties of which over 40,000 were close air support and Marine helicopters evacuated more than 9,800 wounded personnel

=== Taiwan ===
From 6 March – 30 April 1963. The VMF-114, VMA-542 and VMF-235 of the 1st Marine Aircraft Wing from Okinawa deployed to Pingtung Air Base, Taiwan and with ROC Air Force participated in "BLUE EAGLE" exercise. While on Taiwan these units were under the control of United States Taiwan Defense Command.

=== Vietnam ===
From April 1962, when HMM-362 flew into the Mekong Delta to set up operations at the Sóc Trăng Airfield, through April 1975, when helicopters of HMM-164 evacuated the last Americans from the US Embassy, Saigon. While early missions involved Marine helicopters providing logistical support for South Vietnam, this role quickly expanded when 1st MAW pilots and crewmen were called upon to perform their traditional role of providing close air support for Marine combat units as American involvement in the war escalated.

Helicopters played an extensive role in air operations in Vietnam, as Marine pilots flew CH-34s and later CH-46s and CH-53s to transport Marines into landing zones near suspected enemy concentrations, and to evacuate the wounded following combat engagements. Helicopters, supplemented by C-130 transports where there were landing strips, were also used to re-supply Marines in the field at remote outposts. Other Marine pilots flew UH-1E Hueys and AH-1 Cobras. Many of these choppers provided reconnaissance and armed air cover for combat air operations.

The buildup of American troops resulted in the deployment of the Marine Corps' attack and fighter aircraft including the Douglas A-4 and the McDonnell F4B, as well as the maintenance, ordnance, and other support personnel necessary.

=== Global war on terror ===
HMH 463 has deployed to support the Operation Enduring Freedom Mission in Afghanistan in 2009.

== Current aircraft ==
Fixed-wing aircraft

- F/A-18D Hornet
- F-35B Lightning II
- KC-130J Super Hercules

Rotary-wing aircraft

- AH-1Z Viper
- UH-1Y Venom
- CH-53E Super Stallion

Tiltrotor Aircraft

- MV-22B Osprey

UAVs

- MQ-9A Reaper

== Unit awards ==
A unit citation or commendation is an award bestowed upon an organization for the action cited. Members of the unit who participated in said actions are allowed to wear on their uniforms the awarded unit citation. The 1st Marine Aircraft Wing has been presented with the following awards:

Streamer	Award	Year(s)	Additional Info
A streamer with red, gold, and blue horizontal stripes with a bronze star in the center	Presidential Unit Citation Streamer (Navy) with three Bronze Stars	1942, 1950, 1951, 1965-1967	Guadalcanal, Korea, Vietnam
	Presidential Unit Citation Streamer (Army) Streamer	1950	Korea
A green streamer with red, gold, and blue horizontal stripes along the top and bottom with one silver star in the center	Navy Unit Commendation Streamer	1952-1953	Korea
A green streamer with red, gold, and blue horizontal stripes and four stars in the center	Meritorious Unit Commendation Streamer	2000-2002	
	American Defense Service Streamer	1941-1945	World War II
	Asiatic-Pacific Campaign Streamer with one Silver Star		
	World War II Victory Streamer	1941–1945	Pacific War
	China Service Streamer		
	Korean Service Streamer with two Silver Stars	1950-1953	Korea
A red streamer with a horizontal gold stripe and three bronze stars in the center	National Defense Service Streamer with three Bronze Stars	1951–1954, 1961–1974, 1990–1995, 2001–present	Korean War, Vietnam War, Gulf War, war on terrorism
	Armed Forces Expeditionary Streamer		
A yellow streamer with two green horizontal stripes on the outside and three horizontal red stripes and two silver stars and one bronze star in the center	Vietnam Service Streamer with two Silver Stars and three Bronze Star		
A blue streamer with yellow, red, and white horizontal stripes	Global War on Terrorism Service Streamer	2001–present	
	Philippine Liberation Streamer	1945	
	Philippine Republic Presidential Unit Streamer	1945	
	Korean Presidential Unit Citation Streamer	1950	
A gold streamer with red horizontal stripes on the outer portions and a green palm in the center	Vietnam Gallantry Cross with Palm Streamer	1965–1971	
A green streamer with red horizontal stripes	Vietnam Meritorious Unit Citation Civil Actions Streamer	1965–1971	

== See also ==
- List of United States Marine Corps aircraft wings
- United States Marine Corps Aviation
- List of 1st Marine Aircraft Wing Commanders
