= Larson (surname) =

Larson is a Scandinavian patronymic surname meaning "son of Lars". "Lars" is derived from the Roman name "Laurentius", which means "from Laurentum" or "crowned with laurel." There are various spellings. As a surname, Larson may refer to the following notable people:

== People ==
=== Science and mathematics ===
- Edward Larson (b. 1953), American historian
- Gustav Larson (1887–1968), Swedish engineer, co-founder of Volvo
- Jens Fredrick Larson (1891–1981), American pilot and architect
- Lawrence Larson, American engineer
- Paul Larson, American computer scientist
- Richard Larson (b. 1943), American professor and operations researcher
- Ron Larson (b. 1941), American mathematician, author

=== Television and film ===
- Bob Larson, television evangelist
- Brie Larson, American actress and pop singer
- Chad Larson, member of the Aquabats
- Charles Larson, American TV writer and producer
- Eric Larson, animator for the Walt Disney Studios
- Glen A. Larson, television writer and producer
- Jack Larson, American actor, screenwriter and producer
- Jill Larson, American actress
- Lisby Larson, American actress
- Michael Larson, game show contestant
- Nancy Larson, host of the Christian television exercise program Shape Up with Nancy Larson, produced for WCPX-TV
- Ron Larson, art director, album cover designer, graphic artist
- Wolf Larson, Canadian actor

=== Art and literature ===
- Abigail Larson, American illustrator
- Erik Larson, American author
- Gary Larson, American cartoonist, author of The Far Side
- Hope Larson, freelance illustrator, cartoonist
- Joanne Larson, American writer
- Kate Larson (disambiguation), multiple people
- Kent Larson, American architect, author, and academic
- Kirby Larson, author of children's books
- Laura Larson, photographer and artist
- Lisa Larson, Swedish ceramicist

=== Music ===
- Chad Larson, American bass guitarist and actor (The Aquabats)
- Jonathan Larson, American composer
- Nathan Larson, American composer, musician
- Nicolette Larson, American singer

=== Sports ===
- Ben Larson, American college basketball player
- Dan Larson, American baseball player
- David Larson American swimmer
- Gary Larson, Australian rugby player
- Jordan Larson, American volleyball player
- Jud Larson, American Formula One driver
- Kyle Larson, American racing driver
- Kyle Larson (American football), American football player
- Lance Larson, American swimmer
- Lynae Larson, American marathon runner
- Mattie Larson, American gymnast
- Paul Larson (American football), American football player
- Reed Larson, American ice hockey player

=== Politics and law ===
- Alan Larson (born 1949), American diplomat
- Cal Larson, Minnesota state senator
- Chuck Larson, Iowa state senator
- Colin Larson, state representative from Colorado
- Edwin J. Larson (1885–1949), Wisconsin state assemblyman
- Grant Larson, Wyoming state senator
- Henry A. Larson, Minnesota state senator
- James Larson (1855–1923), Wisconsin state assemblyman
- Jerry L. Larson (1936–2018), Iowa Supreme Court justice
- Jess Larson (1904–1987), first Administrator of U.S. General Services
- John B. Larson, U.S. Representative from Connecticut
- Lew Larson, Minnesota state senator
- Morgan Foster Larson, 40th Governor of New Jersey
- Nathan Larson (politician), felon and political candidate from Virginia
- Nancy Larson, Minnesotan politician
- Nels Larson, Wisconsin state assemblyman
- Norman J. Larson, Minnesota state senator
- Oscar John Larson, U.S. Representative from Minnesota
- Thomas Larson (disambiguation), multiple people
- Wendy Larson, American politician

=== Military ===
- August Larson (1904–1981), U.S. Marine Corps major general
- Charles R. Larson (1936–2014), United States Navy admiral
- Doyle E. Larson (1930–2007), U.S. Air Force major general
- Duane S. Larson (1916–2005), North Dakota Air National Guard brigadier general
- Everett F. Larson (1920–1942), United States Marine and Silver Star recipient
- Jake Larson (1922–2025), TikToker and World War II veteran
- Jess Larson (1904–1987), U.S. Air Force Reserve major general
- Westside T. Larson (1892–1977), U.S. Air Force major general

== Fictional characters ==
- Dr. Larson, in the animated television series Darkwing Duck
- Kirsten Larson, American Girl character who immigrates from Sweden to Minnesota in the 1850s
- Vicki Larson, in the situation comedy Full House

== See also ==
- General Larson (disambiguation)
- Justice Larson (disambiguation)
- Senator Larson (disambiguation)
- Larsen
- Larssen
- Larsson
