= Larsson =

Larsson (IPA: [ˈlɑ̌ːʂɔn]) is a Swedish patronymic surname meaning "son of Lars". There are various spellings. Notable people with the surname include:

== Academics ==
- Hans Larsson (1862–1944) was a Swedish Professor of Philosophy at Lund University, Sweden
- Susanna Larsson Swedish epidemiologist at the Karolinska Institutet, Stockholm

== Arts ==
- Annika Larsson, Swedish photographer and video artist
- Carl Larsson, Swedish painter and interior designer
- Karl Larsson (artist), Swedish-American artist

=== Actors ===
- Babben Larsson, Swedish actress and comedian
- Barbro Larsson, Swedish actress
- Chatarina Larsson, Swedish actress

=== Fashion ===
- Alexandra Larsson, Swedish fashion model based in Argentina

=== Literature ===
- Anna Laestadius Larsson, Swedish novelist
- Åsa Larsson, Swedish crime-writer
- Stieg Larsson, Swedish journalist and crime-writer
- Zenia Larsson, Polish-Swedish writer and sculptor of Jewish descent

=== Military ===
- Alexandra Larsson, Swedish LGBT officer

=== Music ===
- Caroline Larsson (born 1986), Swedish singer, songwriter
- Johan Larsson (musician) (born 1974), Swedish musician
- Lars-Erik Larsson (1908–1986), Swedish composer
- Lia Larsson (born 2001), Swedish singer
- Lisa Larsson (born 1967), Swedish singer
- Rolf Magnus Joakim Larsson (born 1963), Swedish singer known professionally as Joey Tempest
- Zara Larsson (born 1997), Swedish singer

== Sports ==
- Adam Larsson, Swedish ice hockey player
- Bo Larsson, Swedish football player
- Emilia Larsson (born 1998), Swedish footballer
- Erik August Larsson, Swedish skier
- Gustav Larsson, Swedish cyclist
- Henrik Larsson, Swedish international football player
- Hugo Larsson, Swedish international football player
- Jacob Larsson, Swedish ice hockey player
- Johanna Larsson, Swedish tennis player
- Jordan Larsson, Swedish football player, son of Henrik Larsson
- Magnus Larsson, Swedish tennis player
- Maria Larsson (ice hockey), Swedish ice hockey player
- Markus Larsson, Swedish alpine skier
- Pelle Larsson (born 2001), Swedish basketball player
- Per Larsson, Swedish sprint canoer
- Sara Larsson, Swedish international football player
- Sebastian Larsson, Swedish football player
- Svante Larsson, Swedish football player

== Politics ==
- Dag Larsson (born 1960), Swedish politician
- John Larsson, the 17th General of The Salvation Army
- Kjell Larsson (1943–2002), Swedish politician
- Malin Larsson (born 1980), Swedish politician
- Rikard Larsson (born 1966), Swedish politician
- Virginia Larsson, Canadian politician and activist

== Other ==
- Göran Larsson (disambiguation), multiple people
- Johan Larsson (disambiguation), multiple people

== Fictional characters ==
- Gunvald Larsson, sidekick of Martin Beck in novels by Maj Sjowall and Per Wahloo

== See also ==
- Larsen (surname)
- Larssen
- Larson (surname)
