= Peter Larsen =

Peter Larsen may refer to:

- Peter Laurentius Larsen (1833–1915), Norwegian-American educator and founding president of Luther College
- Peter Orry Larsen (born 1990), Norwegian footballer
- Peter Thal Larsen, Dutch journalist
- Peter Larsen, former Minister for Food, Agriculture and Fisheries of Denmark
- Peter Larsen (media scholar) (born 1943), professor of media studies
- Peter Larsen (wrestler) (1904–1985), Danish Olympic wrestler
- Peter Larsen (politician) (born 1971), Danish politician

== See also ==
- Larsen (surname)
- Peter Larsson (disambiguation)
- Peter Larson (disambiguation)
