= Peter Larson (disambiguation) =

Peter Larson is an American paleontologist

Peter Larson or Pete Larson may also refer to:

- Pete Larson (American football), (born 1944)
- Peter Larson, co-composer of the off-Broadway musical Brownstone

== See also ==
- Peter Larsen (disambiguation)
- Peter Larsson (disambiguation)
- Larson (surname)
