= George R. E. Shell =

U.S. Marine Corps Brigadier General

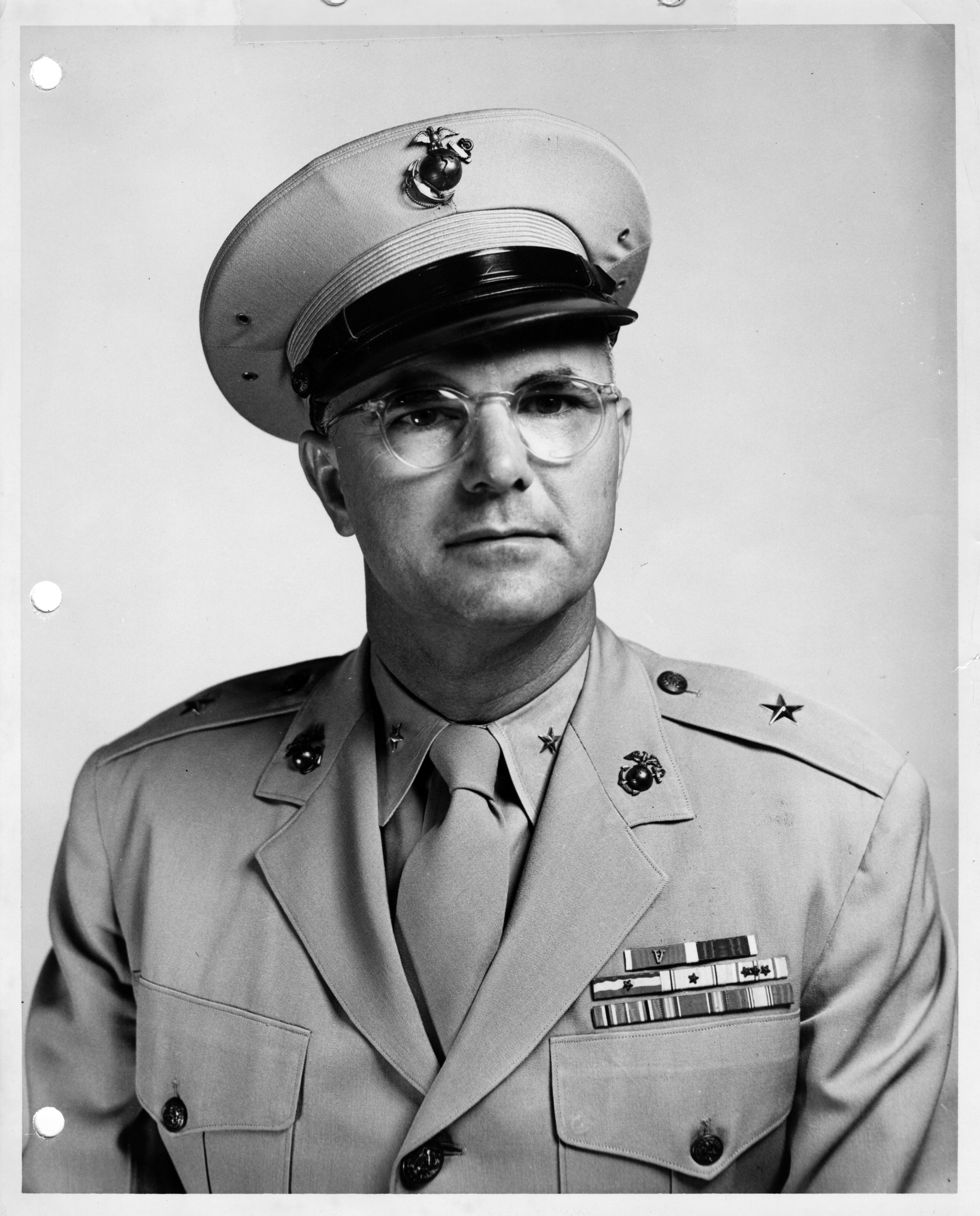
- BG George R. E. Shell, USMC
- Born: October 20, 1908; Phoebus, Virginia, U.S.
- Died: October 30, 1996 (aged 88)
- Burial place: Oak Grove Cemetery; Lexington, Virginia
- Military career
- Allegiance: United States of America
- Branch: United States Marine Corps
- Service years: 1931–1960
- Rank: Brigadier general
- Service number: 0-4671
- Commands: MCRD Parris Island; 1st Marine Brigade; 2nd Battalion, 10th Marines
- Conflicts: World War II: Battle of Guadalcanal; Battle of Tarawa; Battle of Saipan
- Awards: Legion of Merit; Purple Heart
- Other work: Superintendent of VMI

George Richard Edwin Shell (October 20, 1908 – October 30, 1996) was a decorated officer of the United States Marine Corps with the rank of brigadier general, who is most noted as the commanding officer of 2nd Battalion, 10th Marines during World War II. He later served as the 9th Superintendent of the Virginia Military Institute.

== Early career ==
Shell was born on October 20, 1908, in Phoebus, Virginia, and later attended high school in Hampton. During the summer of 1927, he entered the Virginia Military Institute in Lexington, and graduated with a Bachelor of Science degree in electrical engineering in June 1931. Shell was commissioned a second lieutenant in the Marine Corps the same month and assigned for officers training to the Basic School at the Philadelphia Navy Yard. Shell finished basic training in June 1932 and spent the following months serving at the Marine Barracks in Quantico. He was transferred to San Diego, California, at the end of March 1933 and spent a year of service there. He was attached to the Marine detachment aboard the newly commissioned heavy cruiser USS Astoria in March 1934 and took part in the shake-down cruise in the Pacific Ocean with the stops at Samoa, Fiji, New Caledonia, Australia and Hawaii. While aboard that vessel, he was promoted to the rank of first lieutenant in November 1934.

Detached from the USS Astoria in June 1935, Shell spent the following three years of service at the Marine Corps Base San Diego and with the headquarters Department of the Pacific in San Francisco. He was promoted to the rank of captain in July 1938 and assigned to the Battery Commanders' course at Field Artillery School at Fort Sill, Oklahoma in September of that year.

== World War II ==
Upon the graduation from the Field Artillery School in June 1939, Shell joined the 2nd Battalion, 10th Marine Artillery Regiment under Lieutenant Colonel John B. Wilson at San Diego. He served as a battery commander and took part in exercises at San Clemente Island. Shell served with 2nd Battalion until September 1940, when he was appointed commanding officer of the Marine detachment aboard the patrol gunboat USS Charleston. He took part in cruises to Alaska and Aleutian Islands. Promoted to the rank of major in May 1942, he subsequently rejoined the 2nd Battalion, 10th Marines, as executive officer in July of that year.

The 2nd Battalion had recently returned from a period of service in Iceland and conducted training and preparation for combat deployment for another eight months. Meanwhile, Shell was appointed commanding officer of 2nd Battalion and led it overseas as a part of 2nd Marine Division under Major General John Marston in October 1942. They arrived at Wellington in New Zealand, on October 19 and remained there until the end of December 1942.

Shell sailed for Guadalcanal at the beginning of January 1943 and took part in the final drive against Japanese forces. His battalion provided support artillery fire for the advancing Marine and United States Army units during the attack on Cape Esperance and remained in the combat area until February 19, 1943. Along with the rest of the 10th Regiment, the battalion then sailed back to New Zealand for recuperation and Shell was promoted to the rank of lieutenant colonel the next month.

The 10th Marines remained in New Zealand until November 1943, when they embarked for their new mission, the landings at Tarawa Atoll in the Gilbert Islands. The main task was to capture Japanese air base, which could be used for the next advance toward the Marshall Islands. Shell and his battalion subsequently took part in the amphibious landing on Tarawa on November 23.

Shell remained in command of his battalion for the next several months and took part in the amphibious landing on Saipan in Mariana Islands in June 1944. He was wounded by mortar fragments during the night attack on the second day of the battle and evacuated from the island. His wounds requested special care and Shell was ordered back to the United States in July 1944. He subsequently received the Legion of Merit with Combat "V" for his leadership of the battalion in the Pacific theater and also the Purple Heart for his wounds. Shell then spent several months in Naval Hospital in San Diego.

== Later career ==
In July 1946, Shell attended Naval War College in Newport, Rhode Island, and upon graduation in June 1947, was appointed an instructor there. He subsequently received orders for transfer to Washington, D.C., in May 1949, when he was assigned to the Joint Staff of the recently established Joint Chiefs of Staff under General Omar Bradley. While in this capacity, he was promoted to the rank of colonel in August 1949.

While posted to the Joint Chiefs of Staff, Shell also served as a member of the Joint Strategic Plans Group, a member of National Security Council Staff or Staff Assistant to the Joint Chiefs of Staff Representative to the National Security Council. He was ordered to Paris, France in February 1951 and appointed Staff Planning Officer in the Policy Branch within Operations Division at Supreme Headquarters Allied Powers Europe. Shell spent next a year and half in Europe, before he was ordered back to the United States at the end of August 1952.

His next assignment was at Marine Corps Schools Quantico in Virginia, where he served firstly as assistant chief of staff for operations and then as chief of staff. While at Quantico, he also served as a member of the Advanced Research Group, tasked with the development of recommendations on how the Marine air-ground task force should evolve structurally to meet the challenges of atomic warfare and new technologies such as helicopters and jet aircraft. Other members of the group were Thomas J. Coolley, John P. Condon, August Larson Joseph N. Renner, Carson A. Roberts, Samuel R. Shaw, Eustace R. Smoak, William J. Van Ryzin, and Richard G. Weede.

Shell was ordered to the headquarters of Fleet Marine Force Atlantic at Norfolk, where he was appointed chief of staff under Lieutenant General Oliver P. Smith in July 1954. However, Shell left Norfolk during June 1956; he was ordered to Kaneohe Bay, Hawaii, where he assumed command of 1st Marine Brigade. In his new capacity, he was promoted to the rank of brigadier general.

In April 1957, Shell was transferred to the Marine Corps Recruit Depot Parris Island, where he was appointed deputy commander and commanding general of Recruit Training Command. He also served as deputy to the base commander, Robert B. Luckey, until August 1958. He then spent a tour of duty at Headquarters Marine Corps as deputy chief of staff for research and development. Shell returned to Parris Island in October 1959, when he succeeded Major General David M. Shoup as depot commander. However, his career in the Marine Corps ended in June 1960, when he was offered the capacity of superintendent of the Virginia Military Institute (VMI). He served at the VMI until June 30, 1971, when he was relieved by Major General Richard L. Irby. Shell died on October 30, 1996, and is buried at Oak Grove Cemetery in Lexington, Virginia, together with his wife, Alice Reid Cushing Shell (1912–2002).

== Decorations ==
This is the ribbon bar of Brigadier General George R. E. Shell:

1st Row	Legion of Merit with Combat "V"		Purple Heart
2nd Row	Navy Presidential Unit Citation with 3/16" service star	American Defense Service Medal with Base Clasp	Asiatic-Pacific Campaign Medal with three 3/16" service stars
3rd Row	American Campaign Medal	World War II Victory Medal	National Defense Service Medal

Military offices
Preceded by David M. Shoup	Commanding General of the Marine Corps Recruit Depot Parris Island; October 20, 1959 – June 30, 1960	Succeeded by Thomas G. Ennis
Preceded by Wallace M. Greene	Commanding General of the Marine Corps Recruit Depot Parris Island; March 25, 1957 – July 4, 1957	Succeeded by Robert B. Luckey
