= Richard G. Weede =

U.S. Marine Corps general (1911–1985)

Richard Garfield Weede
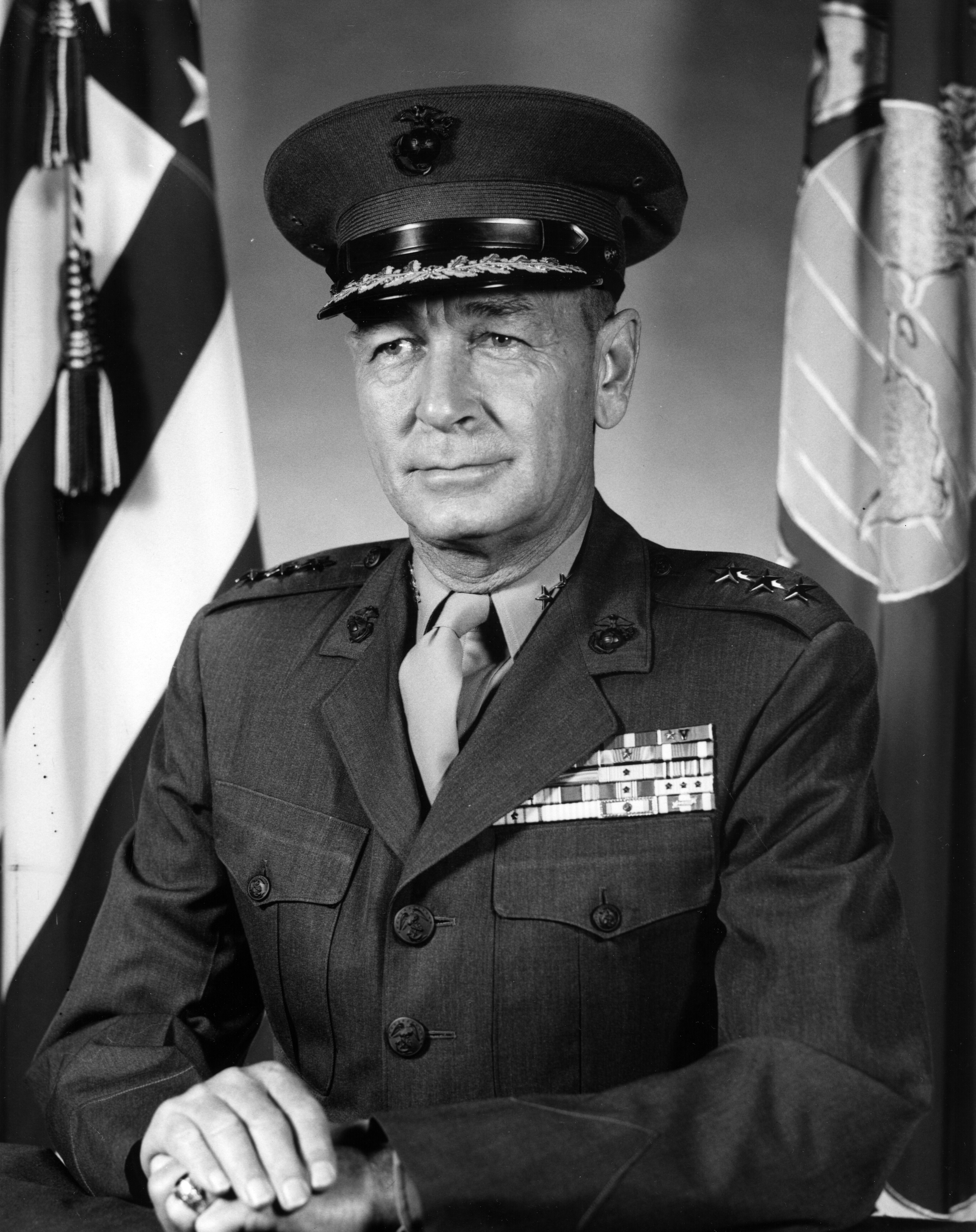
- LTG Richard G. Weede, USMC
- Born: September 26, 1911; Sterling, Kansas, US
- Died: October 22, 1985 (aged 74); Portsmouth Naval Hospital, Virginia, US
- Burial place: Arlington National Cemetery
- Military career
- Allegiance: United States of America
- Branch: United States Marine Corps
- Service years: 1935–1969
- Rank: Lieutenant general
- Nickname: "Dick"
- Service number: 0-5082
- Commands: Fleet Marine Force, Atlantic; 1st Marine Brigade; 5th Marine Regiment; 2nd Battalion, 10th Marines
- Conflicts: World War II: Battle of Tarawa; Battle of Okinawa; Korean War: Battle of the Punchbowl; Vietnam War
- Awards: Distinguished Service Medal (2); Legion of Merit (2); Bronze Star Medal; Air Medal (2); Navy Commendation Medal

Richard Garfield Weede (September 26, 1911 – October 22, 1985) was a highly decorated officer of the United States Marine Corps with the rank of lieutenant general. He served in World War II, Korea and during the early phase of Vietnam War and completed his career as commanding general of Fleet Marine Force, Atlantic.

== Early life ==
Richard G. Weede was born on September 26, 1911, in Sterling, Kansas, and, following high school, he enrolled the Kansas State Teachers College, but left during the second year there and entered the United States Naval Academy at Annapolis, Maryland, in 1931. During his time at the academy, Weede was active in basketball team, competed in track and also was a member of Ring committee, which was responsible for final design of the class ring.

He graduated on June 5, 1935, and was commissioned second lieutenant in the Marine Corps on the same date. Some of his classmates reached the general officer rank later: Robert E. Cushman Jr., Eli T. Reich, Eugene Fluckey, Ralph M. Metcalf or Arnold F. Johnston.

Weede was subsequently ordered to the Basic School at Philadelphia Navy Yard for his basic officer training which he completed in February 1936. With 124 students, it was the largest Basic School class to that date. This class provided two future Marine Corps Commandants (Leonard F. Chapman Jr. and Robert E. Cushman Jr.), five lieutenant generals (Lewis J. Fields, Frederick E. Leek, Herman Nickerson Jr., William J. Van Ryzin, Weede), five major generals (William R. Collins, William T. Fairbourn, Bruno Hochmuth, Raymond L. Murray, Carey A. Randall) and six brigadier generals (William W. Buchanan, Odell M. Conoley, Frederick P. Henderson, Roy L. Kline, John C. Miller Jr., Thomas F. Riley).

He was subsequently attached to the 1st Battalion, 10th Marines at Quantico, Virginia. His unit was attached to the 2nd Marine Brigade in October 1936 and served in San Diego, California and Guam until July 1940. He was meanwhile promoted to the rank of first lieutenant in July 1938.

== World War II ==
Following his return to the United States, Weede was ordered to Marine Corps Recruit Depot Parris Island, South Carolina and attached to the newly activated 4th Defense Battalion under Major George F. Good. This new kind of Anti-aircraft/coastal defense units was designated for the defense of naval bases in South Pacific against potential threats. With the activation of 5th Defense Battalion at Parris Island in December of that year, Major Good transferred Weede to his unit. Weede was promoted to the rank of captain in March 1941.

After the Japanese Attack on Pearl Harbor, Captain Weede was transferred to 2nd Defense Battalion in January 1942. The battalion was already sent to the Pacific, and Weede served at American Samoa under Lieutenant Colonel Raymond E. Knapp as commanding officer of the 5-Inch Artillery Group. He was promoted to the rank of major in May 1942 and to lieutenant colonel in May 1943.

Weede led his unit to Tarawa at the end of November 1943, following the main landing and the battalion under his command repelled several enemy bombing raids. He was subsequently ordered to the United States for instruction at Field Artillery School at Fort Sill, Oklahoma in January 1944, but rejoined his unit in May of that year. The 2nd Defense Battalion was already redesignated 2nd Antiaircraft Artillery Battalion and Weede served as its commander until October 1944.

He was subsequently transferred to the 10th Marine Artillery Regiment, 2nd Marine Division and appointed commanding officer of 2nd Battalion. Under his command, 2nd Battalion took part in the practice for its next combat deployment – Okinawa.

The 2nd Battalion was part of the floating reserve for the Okinawa invasion, but toward the end of June 1945, commanding general of 10th Army, Lieutenant general Simon B. Buckner requested fresh units to reinforce main forces exhausted by weeks of combat. The Second Marine Division provided 8th Marines under the command of Colonel Clarence R. Wallace and Weede and his 2nd Battalion to support them.

Weede landed with his unit on Okinawa at the noon of June 16 and quickly deployed his battalion. He led artillery attack on the village of Makabe and helped destroy remnants of Japanese forces, which were preparing for counterattack. Three days later, the island was declared secured and Weede and his regiment were ordered back to Saipan. For his service during Tarawa and Okinawa campaigns, he was decorated with the Bronze Star Medal with Combat "V".

== Postwar service and Korea ==
Lieutenant Colonel Weede returned stateside in July 1945 and was attached to the Bureau of Ordnance, Navy Department under Vice Admiral George F. Hussey. He served in Washington until August 1947, when he was ordered for the Senior Course to the Marine Corps Schools, Quantico. Upon the graduation from the course in June 1948, Weede served consecutively as Supervisory Instructor within Senior Course and assistant director of the Junior Course. He was also promoted to the rank of colonel in June 1950.

During the Korean War, Weede was ordered to the Far East in May 1951 and appointed assistant chief of staff for operations, 1st Marine Division under Major General Gerald C. Thomas. He served in that capacity until the end of August of that year and was simultaneously the divisional chief of staff for a brief period. Weede then assumed command of 5th Marine Regiment at the beginning of August of that year and took part in the frontline patrols and rear area security missions.

Following the breakdown of armistice negotiations in August 1951, the United Nations Command decided to launch a limited offensive in the late summer/early autumn to shorten and straighten sections of their lines, acquire better defensive terrain, and deny the enemy key vantage points from which they could observe and target UN positions. Colonel Weede led his 5th Marines into action on September 15 and during the Battle of the Punchbowl and took part in the assault on the Kanmubong Ridge, where they captured the Hill 812. He was decorated with the Legion of Merit with Combat "V" for his leadership of 5th Marines at the Punchbowl.

Weede was again appointed divisional chief of staff in November 1951 and remained in that capacity until February 15, 1952. He was succeeded by Colonel Custis Burton Jr. and ordered to the United States under rotation policy. Weede received his second Legion of Merit for work as chief of staff and two Air Medals for his participation in liaison and reconnaissance flights over the frontline.

Upon his return, Weede served at Headquarters Marine Corps as a member of the Fleet Marine Force Organizational Structure Board and of the Naval Examining Board until August 1952. He was then ordered for instruction at the Army War College at Carlisle Barracks, Pennsylvania, and graduated in June 1953.

== Later service and Vietnam ==
His next assignment was at Marine Corps Schools, Quantico, where he served as a member of Advanced Research Group. This group was tasked with the development of the recommendations on how the MAGTF should evolve structurally to meet the challenges of atomic warfare and new technologies such as helicopters and jet aircraft. The members of the group were Thomas J. Coolley, John P. Condon, August Larson, Joseph N. Renner, Carson A. Roberts, Samuel R. Shaw, George R. E. Shell, Eustace R. Smoak and William J. Van Ryzin.

He was reassigned to the Headquarters Marine Corps in July 1954 as assistant personnel officer under Major General Reginald H. Ridgely Jr. and served simultaneously with the Marine Corps Table of Organization Board until July 1956. These duties were followed by assignment as chief of staff, 1st Marine Division, at Camp Pendleton, California. He served under Major General Edward W. Snedeker until May 1958 and took part in several exercises.

Weede was promoted to the rank of brigadier general in June 1958 and appointed commanding general of Marine Corps Recruit Training Command at Marine Corps Base San Diego. He departed San Diego and was transferred to Marine Corps Air Station Kaneohe Bay, Hawaii in November 1959 and relieved Brigadier General Frederick L. Wieseman as commanding general of 1st Marine Brigade. His brigade served as the "middleweight" global crisis response force and was able to "operate independently, as a service component, or to lead a Joint Task Force. While in this capacity, Weede was promoted to the rank of major general in August 1961.

He left Hawaii at the beginning of February 1962 and sailed for Saigon, South Vietnam to be appointed Chief of Staff of the newly created Military Assistance Command, Vietnam under General Paul D. Harkins. Within this joint-service command, Weede was co-responsible for all units operating in Vietnam until May 1964. He subsequently received the Navy Distinguished Service Medal for his service in this capacity.

Upon his return stateside, Weede was appointed assistant chief of staff for operations at Headquarters Marine Corps and remained in this capacity until July 1965. He then succeeded Major General Lewis J. Fields as director of personnel and served until May 31, 1967. Weede distinguished himself again and received the Navy Commendation Medal.

Weede was nominated for the rank of lieutenant general by the president, Lyndon B. Johnson, in May 1967 and subsequently promoted on July 1 of that year. For his new billet, Weede was ordered to Norfolk, Virginia, and appointed commanding general of Fleet Marine Force, Atlantic. He also simultaneously served as commanding general of II Marine Expeditionary Force.

He retired from the Marine Corps on August 31, 1969, after 34 years of active service. At his retirement ceremony, Weede was decorated with his second Navy Distinguished Service Medal for his service with Fleet Marine Force, Atlantic.

== Retirement ==
Richard G. Weede settled in Portsmouth, Virginia, where he died in Portsmouth Naval Hospital on October 22, 1985. He is buried together with his wife Margaret Dunton Weede (1912–2005) at Arlington National Cemetery. They had one son, Richard Dunton Weede, who also served in the Marine Corps and reached the rank of colonel.

== Decorations ==
A complete list of the general's medals and decorations include:

1st Row	Navy Distinguished Service Medal with one 5/16" Gold Star	Legion of Merit with Combat "V" with one 5/16" Gold Star	Bronze Star Medal with Combat "V"	Air Medal with one 5/16" Gold Star
2nd Row	Navy Commendation Medal	Navy Presidential Unit Citation	American Defense Service Medal with Fleet Clasp	American Campaign Medal
3rd Row	Asiatic-Pacific Campaign Medal with three 3/16 inch service stars	World War II Victory Medal	National Defense Service Medal with one star	Korean Service Medal with three 3/16 inch service stars
4th Row	Vietnam Service Medal with one 3/16 inch service star	United Nations Korea Medal	Republic of Korea Presidential Unit Citation	Vietnam Campaign Medal

== See also ==
- Battle of Okinawa
- Military Assistance Command, Vietnam
- Fleet Marine Force, Atlantic

Military offices
Preceded by Alpha L. Bowser	Commanding General of the Fleet Marine Force, Atlantic; July 1, 1967 – August 31, 1969	Succeeded by Frederick E. Leek
Preceded by Frederick L. Wieseman	Commanding General of the 1st Marine Brigade; November 20, 1959 – February 2, 1962	Succeeded by Keith B. McCutcheon
