= Thomas Larsson =

Thomas Larsson may refer to:

- Thomas Larsson (musician) (born 1964), Swedish guitarist and songwriter
- Thomas Larsson (ice hockey) (born 1988), Swedish ice hockey player
- Thomas Larsson (footballer) (born 1955), Swedish footballer
- Tommy Larsson (born 1951), Swedish footballer

== See also ==
- Thomas Larson (disambiguation)
