= 2nd Battalion, 10th Marines =

2nd Battalion 10th Marines
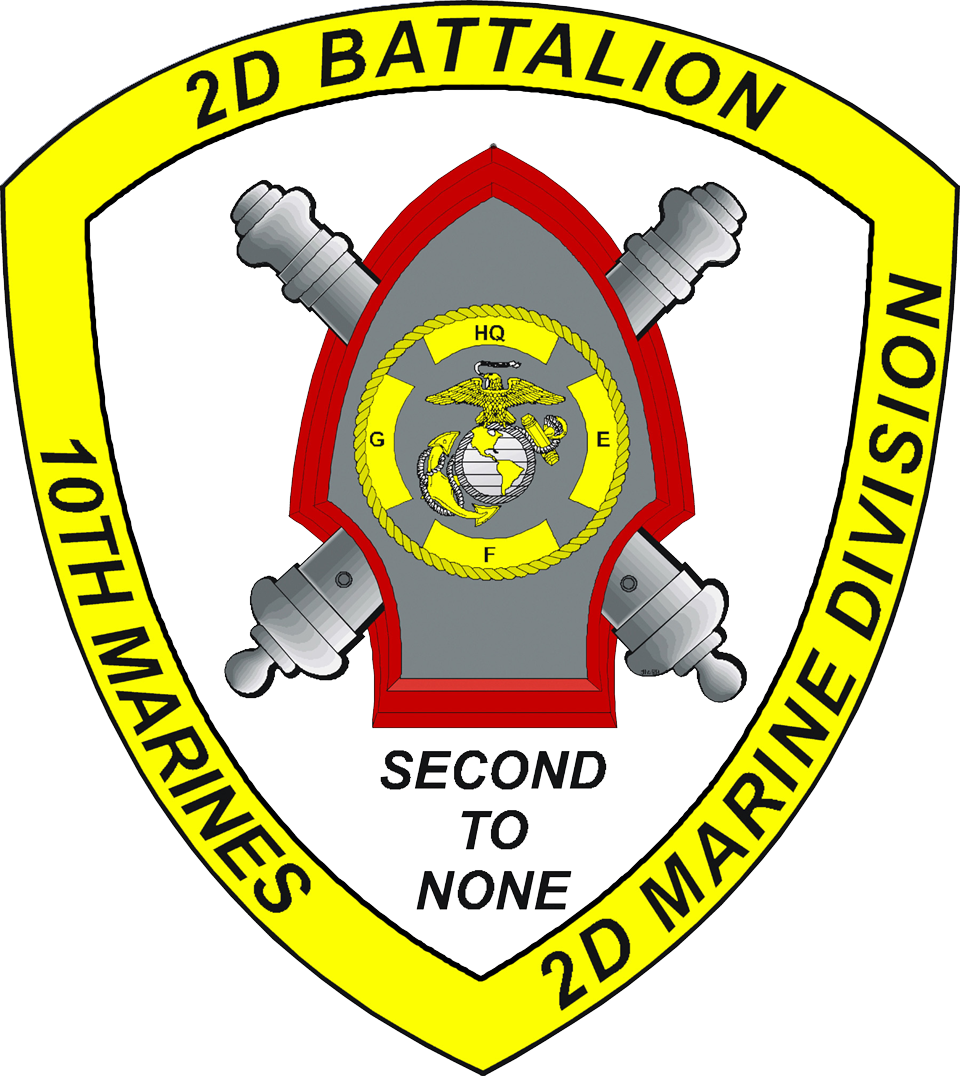
- 2/10 Insignia
- Active: 11 April 1941–present
- Country: United States of America
- Branch: United States Marine Corps
- Type: Artillery
- Role: Provide fires in support of 2nd Marine Division
- Part of: 10th Marine Regiment; 2nd Marine Division
- Garrison/HQ: Marine Corps Base Camp Lejeune
- Nickname: Gunslinger
- Motto: "Second to None"
- Engagements: World War II; Battle of Guadalcanal; Battle of Tarawa; Battle of Saipan; Battle of Tinian; Battle of Okinawa; Operation Desert Storm; War on terror; Operation Iraqi Freedom

Commanders
- Current commander: LtCol Brian S. Pegram
- Notable commanders: William H. Harrison; George R. E. Shell; Richard G. Weede; Joseph C. Fegan Jr.

2nd Battalion 10th Marines (2/10) is an artillery battalion of the United States Marine Corps comprising two cannon batteries, three rocket batteries, and a headquarters battery. The battalion is stationed at Marine Corps Base Camp Lejeune, North Carolina and its primary weapon systems are the M777A2 howitzer with a maximum effective range of 30 km and the M142 HIMARS with a maximum effective range of 300km. They fall under the command of the 10th Marine Regiment and 2nd Marine Division.

== Subordinate units ==
- Headquarters Battery
- Battery E (Echo Battery)
- Battery F (Fox Battery)
- Battery G (Golf Battery)
- Battery H (Hotel Battery)
- Battery S (Sierra Battery)

== History ==
=== World War II ===
The 2nd Battalion 10th Marines was activated on 11 April 1941, as the 4th Battalion 10th Marines. They were deployed with the 6th Marine Regiment to Iceland from Spring 1941 to Spring 1942. In December 1942, they deployed to the Pacific theater. On 20 July 1945, they were re-designated as the 2nd Battalion 10th Marines.

The 2nd Battalion 10th Marines participated in the following World War II battles:

- Battle of Guadalcanal
- Battle of Tarawa
- Battle of Saipan
- Battle of Tinian
- Battle of Okinawa
- Occupation of Japan

=== Post World War II ===
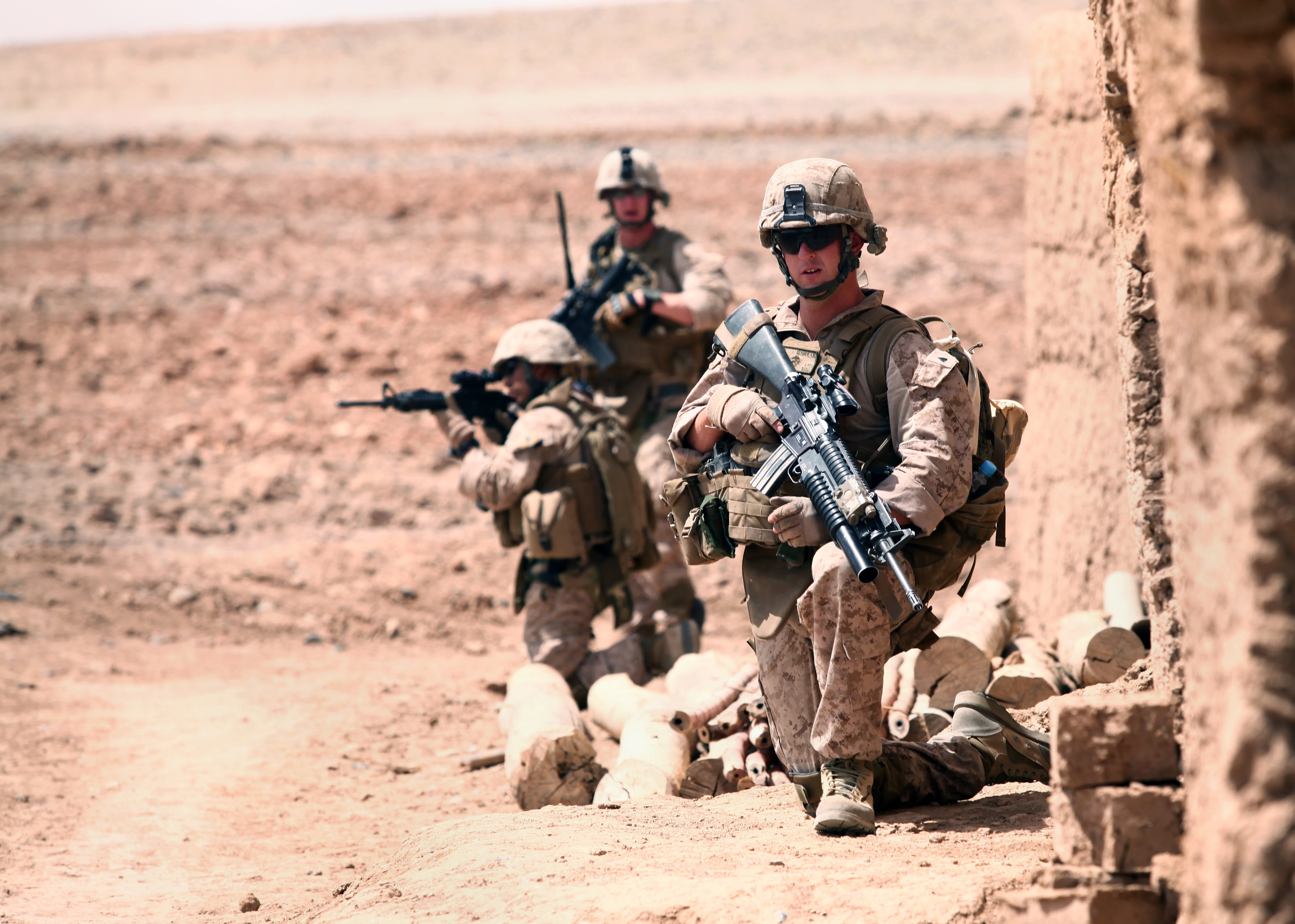
U.S. Marines with Golf Battery, 2nd Battalion, 10th Marine Regiment (2/10) set up security and await an explosive ordnance disposal team during a patrol through local Afghan settlements in Habbib Abad, Afghanistan, 28 May 2012

In July 1946, 2/10 relocated to Marine Corps Base Camp Lejeune, North Carolina. From 1951 to present, they participated in LF6F deployments: the Cuban Missile Crisis (October – November 1962), the intervention in the Dominican Republic (April – May 1965), Operation Desert Storm (December 1990 – April 1991), Operation Phantom Fury, and the Battle of Abu Ghraib (April 2005) as part of Operation Iraqi Freedom.

The battalion again deployed in support of Operation Iraqi Freedom (OIF) from January to September 2007. During this time they were based out of Camp Fallujah. In January 2009 the battalion again deployed to Iraq as a civil affairs group in support of OIF. During this deployment they were based out of Al Asad Airbase.

In 2012, The battalion deployed to the Helmand province of Afghanistan in support of Operation Enduring Freedom. Headquarters Battery was located at Camp Leatherneck, performing the missions of base security; tactical recovery of aircraft and personnel; joint forces patrolling; and the base quick reaction force. Most notably, elements of the battery were some of the first responders to the attack on Camp Bastion and also responded to the Zaranj bombing in August of 2012 to render first aid and assistance. Echo Battery was located in Delaram, Afghanistan, at Forward Operating Base Delaram II and Forward Operating Base Dwyer as base security.

== Unit awards ==
A unit citation or commendation is an award bestowed upon an organization for the action cited. Members of the unit who participated in said actions are allowed to wear on their uniforms the awarded unit citation. 2/10 has been presented with the following awards:

Ribbon	Unit Award
	Presidential Unit Citation
	Navy Unit Commendation
	American Defense Service Medal
	Asiatic-Pacific Campaign Medal with four Bronze Stars
	World War II Victory Medal
	Navy Occupation Service Medal with Asia clasp
	National Defense Service Medal with 2 Bronze Stars
	Armed Forces Expeditionary Medal with Bronze Star
	Southwest Asia Service Medal with three Bronze Stars
	Afghanistan Campaign Medal
	Iraq Campaign Medal with 5 Bronze stars
	Global War on Terrorism Service Medal

== Notable former members ==
- Charles E. Phillips – President of the Oracle Corporation and member of President Obama's Economic Recovery Advisory Board.
- Shaggy- Served as a Field Artillery Cannoneer.

== See also ==
- List of United States Marine Corps battalions
- Organization of the United States Marine Corps
