= Larsen (surname) =

Larsen Danish pronunciation: [ˈlɑːsn̩], is a Danish-Norwegian patronymic surname, literally meaning "son of Lars" (equivalent of Laurentius). It is the seventh most common surname in Denmark, shared by about 2.4% of the population.

Larsen may refer to the following notable people:

== In engineering ==
- Gunnar Larsen (politician) (1902–1973), Danish chemical engineer, businessman and politician
- Henning Holck-Larsen (1907–2003), Danish co-founder of Indian engineering firm Larsen & Toubro

== In exploration ==
- Carl Anton Larsen (1860–1924), Norwegian Antarctic explorer
- Henry Larsen (1899–1964), Canadian Arctic explorer
- Petter Larsen (1890–1946), Norwegian sailor
- Torry Larsen (born 1971), Norwegian adventurer and Arctic explorer

== In music ==
- Blaine Larsen (born 1986), American country music artist
- Brian Larsen (born 1986), American singer-songwriter and producer
- Jens Peter Larsen (1902–1988), Danish musicologist
- Jon Larsen (Norwegian musician) (born 1959), Norwegian gypsy jazz guitarist, record producer, painter, and amateur scientific researcher
- Jon Larsen (Danish musician) (born 1970), Danish musician, drummer for Volbeat
- Kim Larsen (1945–2018), Danish rock musician
- Libby Larsen (born 1950), American composer
- Magnus Larsen, Norwegian bass guitar player, Di Derre
- Marit Larsen (born 1983), Norwegian singer and songwriter
- Micheal Larsen (1981–2010), known as Eyedea, American musician, rapper and poet
- Neil Larsen (born 1948), American jazz keyboardist, musical arranger and composer
- Tutta Larsen (born 1974), Russian singer
- William Wiik Larsen (born 1986), Norwegian record producer, songwriter and musician

== In politics ==
- Aksel Larsen (1897–1972), Danish politician
- Christina Höj Larsen (born 1971), Swedish politician
- Doug Larsen (c. 1976–2023), American politician and businessman
- Ernest A. Larsen (born 1932), American politician and educator
- Ester Larsen (1936–2025), Danish politician and schoolteacher
- Gry Larsen (born 1975), Norwegian politician
- Helge Larsen (1915–2000), Danish politician
- Nils Seye Larsen (born 1980), Swedish politician
- Reidar T. Larsen (1923–2012), Norwegian politician
- Rick Larsen (born 1965), American politician
- Steffen Larsen (born 1983), Danish politician
- Terje Rød-Larsen (born 1947), Norwegian diplomat and politician
- Tove Lindbo Larsen (1928–2018), Danish politician

== In sports and games ==
- Art Larsen (1925–2012), American tennis player
- Alba Hurup Larsen (born 2008), Danish racing driver
- Bent Larsen (1935–2010), Danish chess player
- Blair Larsen (born 1969), New Zealand rugby player
- Brad Larsen (born 1977), Canadian ice hockey player
- Don Larsen (1929–2020), American baseball player
- Edvard Larsen (1881–1914), Norwegian triple jumper
- Ernst Larsen (1926–2015), Norwegian athlete
- Gary Larsen (born 1942), American football player
- Gavin Larsen (born 1962), New Zealand cricketer
- Gert Larsen (born 1960), Danish curler and coach
- Ib Larsen (born 1945), Danish rower
- Ike Larsen (born 2003), American football player
- Ingrid Larsen (1912–1997), Danish diver
- Ingrid Larsen (chess player) (1909–1990), Danish chess player
- Jack Larsen (baseball) (born 1995), American baseball player
- Jacob Larsen (basketball) (born 1997), Danish player
- Jens Larsen (born 1969), Danish volleyball player and coach
- Jeremy Larsen (born 1984), American mixed martial artist
- Josh Larsen (born 1994), Canadian rugby player
- Kyle Larsen (1950–2012), American bridge player
- Lyn Larsen (born 1963), Australian cricketer
- Marco Larsen (born 1993), Danish footballer
- Øjvind Larsen (1882–1960), Danish chess player
- Philip Larsen (born 1989), Danish ice hockey player
- Preben Elkjær Larsen (born 1957), Danish footballer
- Roald Larsen (1898–1959), Norwegian speed skater
- Søren Larsen (born 1981), Danish footballer
- Tonje Larsen (born 1975), Norwegian handball player
- Tore Helge Larsen (1945–2015), Norwegian harness racer
- Uffe Schultz Larsen (1921–2005), Danish sport shooter

== In other fields ==
- Alf Larsen (1885–1967), Norwegian poet, essayist and magazine editor
- Anders Larsen (1870–1949), Sami teacher, journalist and writer
- Anne-Lise Salling Larsen (1934–2022), Danish nurse and professor
- Barry Larsen (1956–2023), Scottish businessman
- Bryan Larsen (born 1975), American painter
- David Larsen (born 1980), American stage actor
- Emanuel Larsen (1823–1859), Danish painter
- Erik Otto Larsen (1931–2008), Danish novelist
- Esper Signius Larsen, Jr. (1879–1961), American petrologist
- Frederick Niels Larsen (1932–2019), American leader of the Remnant Church of Jesus Christ of Latter Day Saints
- Hanna Astrup Larsen (1873–1945), American writer, editor and translator
- Henrik Sass Larsen (born 1966), Danish politician
- Henry Louis Larsen (1890–1962), American Marine Corps General; Governor of American Samoa and Guam
- Ilselil Larsen (1934–2025), Danish actress
- Jakob Larsen (1888–1974), an American classical scholar
- Jonathan Z. Larsen (born 1940), American journalist
- Marianne Larsen (1951–2025), Danish poet and writer
- Megan Larsen (born 1962), New Zealand-born Australian-based organic skincare entrepreneur
- Mernet Larsen (born 1940), American artist
- Michael J. Larsen, American mathematician
- Mickey Borgfjord Larsen (1971–2003), Danish organized crime figure
- Nella Larsen (1891–1964), American novelist
- Øivind Larsen (born 1938), Norwegian physician
- Roy E. Larsen (1899–1979), American publishing executive, president of Time magazine
- Sally Larsen (born 1954), American photographer
- Sine Larsen (1943–2025), Danish chemist and crystallographer
- Søren Absalon Larsen (1871–1957), Danish physicist, discoverer of the Larsen acoustic feedback effect
- Terje Larsen (1958–2018), Norwegian serial burglar
- Torben Bjørn Larsen (1944–2015), Danish lepidopterist
- Tryggve Larssen (1887–1967), Norwegian actor

== See also ==
- Larssen
- Larson (surname)
- Larsson
- Lassen (disambiguation)
