= General Larsen =

General Larsen may refer to:

- Dennis R. Larsen (fl. 1970s–2000s), U.S. Air Force lieutenant general
- Henry Louis Larsen (1890–1962), U.S. Marine Corps lieutenant general
- Stanley R. Larsen (1915–2000), U.S. Army lieutenant general

== See also ==
- General Larson (disambiguation)
