= General Larson =

General Larson may refer to:

- August Larson (1904–1981), U.S. Marine Corps major general
- Doyle E. Larson (1930–2007), U.S. Air Force major general
- Duane S. Larson (1916–2005), North Dakota Air National Guard brigadier general
- Jess Larson (1904–1987), U.S. Air Force Reserve major general
- Westside T. Larson (1892–1977), U.S. Air Force major general

== See also ==
- General Larsen (disambiguation)
