= Peter Larsson =

Peter Larsson may refer to:

- Peter Larsson (footballer, born 1961), Swedish footballer
- Peter Larsson (footballer, born 1984), Swedish footballer
- Peter Larsson (cross-country skier) (born 1978), Swedish cross country skier
- Peter Larsson (ice hockey), ice hockey player in 1999–2000 Deutsche Eishockey Liga season

== See also ==
- Peter Larsen (disambiguation)
- Peter Larson (disambiguation)
