= Senator Larsen =

Senator Larsen may refer to:

- Allan Larsen (1919–2005), Idaho State Senate
- Cliff Larsen (born 1942/43), Montana State Senate
- Doug Larsen (1976–2023), North Dakota State Senate
- Oley Larsen (born 1964), North Dakota State Senate
- Richard F. Larsen (1936–2022), North Dakota State Senate
- Sylvia Larsen (born 1949), New Hampshire State Senate

== See also ==
- Senator Larson (disambiguation)
