= Larssen =

Larssen is a Norwegian surname which may refer to the following notable people:

- Anna Larssen (1875–1955), Danish actress and preacher
- Georg Hagerup-Larssen (1903–1982), Norwegian engineer and businessperson
- Heidi Larssen (born 1951), Norwegian politician
- John Olav Larssen (1927–2009), Norwegian evangelical preacher and missionary
- Lars Andreas Larssen (1935–2014), Norwegian stage, film and television actor
- Olav Larssen (1894–1981), Norwegian newspaper editor and politician
- Per Larssen (1881–1947), Norwegian engineer, Minister of Trade 1931–1932
- Rolf Falk-Larssen (born 1960), Norwegian speed skater
- Svein Døvle Larssen (1928–2015), Norwegian newspaper editor
- Trude Brænne Larssen (born 1967), Norwegian novelist

== See also ==
- Larsen
- Larsson
- Larson (surname)
