= Johan Larsson =

Johan Larsson may refer to:

- Johan Larsson (bassist) (born 1974), Swedish heavy metal bass guitarist
- Johan Larsson (ice hockey, born 1986), Swedish ice hockey player
- Johan Larsson (ice hockey, born 1992), Swedish ice hockey player, drafted by the Minnesota Wild
- Johan Larsson (footballer) (born 1990), Swedish football player
- Johan Larsson i Örbyhus (1877–1947), Swedish politician

== See also ==
- Johannes Larsen (1867–1961), Danish painter
