= Judge Larson =

Judge Larson may refer to:

- Earl R. Larson (1911–2001), judge of the United States District Court for the District of Minnesota
- Joan Larsen (born 1968), judge of the United States Court of Appeals for the Sixth Circuit
- Stephen G. Larson (born 1964), district judge of the United States District Court for the Central District of California

== See also ==
- Justice Larson (disambiguation)
