= Bryan Larsen =

American realist painter (born 1975)

Bryan Lamont Larsen Jr. (born 1975) is an American romantic realist painter, born in Salt Lake City, Utah on February 12, 1975.

Larsen was inspired by the figurative works of the Pre-Raphaelite painters, William-Adolphe Bouguereau, Lawrence Alma-Tadema, and other nineteenth century European painters. He was educated at Utah State University and at the Grand Central Academy Summer Intensives. Larsen's work includes architectural elements and figurative works, with themes emphasizing beauty, innovation, aspiration, and optimism for the future. His work can be found in private art collections around the world. His website, Bryan Larsen Fine Art, contains a large catalog of his work and artwork that is available for purchase. He is represented by Quent Cordair Fine Art, an art gallery in downtown Napa, California. Larsen has completed large commissions (>16 feet wide) and smaller works for private collectors and companies. Larsen is supportive of ongoing efforts by the Art Renewal Center, a leading organization working to foster a re-emergence of realism and classical technique in art culture.

== Awards ==
July 2016 - 'Saturn and Dione', Art Renewal Center Annual Salon Finalists, Art Renewal Salon, Port Reading, NJ

July 2014/2015 – ‘Terra Incognita’ and ‘The Unknown Awaits’, Art Renewal Center Annual Salon Finalists, Art Renewal Center International Salon, Port Reading, NJ

July 2013/2014 – ‘Nocturne,’ 'Please Remain Calm' and 'Sense of Wonder', Art Renewal Center Annual Salon Finalists, Art Renewal Center International Salon, Port Reading, NJ

Feb 2013 – Bryan is accepted as an Art Renewal Center Living Master

July 2012/2013 - 'Gracenote', Art Renewal Center Annual Salon Finalist, Art Renewal Center International Salon, Port Reading, NJ

July 2011/2012 – ‘Between Chapters’, Art Renewal Center Annual Salon Finalist, Art Renewal Center International Salon, Port Reading, NJ

May 2011 – ‘Night Light’, Art Renewal Center Annual Salon Finalist Art Renewal Center International Salon, Port Reading, NJ

May 2010 – ‘Muse and Medium’, Award of Merit Springville Museum Annual Spring Salon, Springville, UT

May 2010 – ‘Contrast’, Art Renewal Center Annual Salon Finalist Art Renewal Center International Salon, Port Reading, NJ

May 2009 – ‘Deliberation’, Art Renewal Center Annual Salon Finalist, Art Renewal, Port Reading, NJ

== Work ==
Larsen expressed an interest in science, engineering, architecture, and particularly, space and space exploration at an early age. His family fostered his interests in these topics, and supported his growing art talent. His themes express an appreciation for natural beauty, including the human figure, and its integration within the natural landscape. Larsen seeks to create artworks that incorporate conservation-minded construction, materials, and techniques. About his work, Larsen has said, "... I am interested in continuing to portray themes of beauty, achievement, innovation, and aspiration, but more recently with an emphasis on narrative and an optimistic view of the future. To that end, I like to focus on subjects that incorporate these themes and are also suggestive of a not-too-distant future, and that portray a positive perspective. My goal is not to paint science fiction, but to express what I find important, beautiful, and inspirational about the world, the universe, and human kind’s place in it from a point of view in the future."

Larsen's works also feature children and their capacity to imagine the future as an amazing and beautiful place in a sincere way. On this topic, Larsen says, "Children and their aspirations are favorite subjects of mine. As a parent, I envision a future for my children that is challenging, but also filled with possibility and wonder..."

Larsen has been featured on Artist-A-Day, The Studio Podcast with Danny Grant, and 15 Bytes magazine, a Utah-based art news outlet. He has also been featured as a local artist at the Rose Wagner Arts Center and Theater in downtown Salt Lake City, UT.

== Personal life ==
Larsen lives in Salt Lake City, UT with his wife and three children. In addition to his successful artistic career, he also is an avid long-distance runner.

== See also ==
- Jeffrey Hein - American/UT realist artist
- Danny Grant - American/TX realist artist
- Graydon Parrish - American/TX realist artist
- Jacob Collins - American/NY realist artist
- Jeremy Lipking - American/CA realist artist
