= Alexandra Larsson (Swedish Air Force) =

Retired Swedish Air Force officer and IT specialist

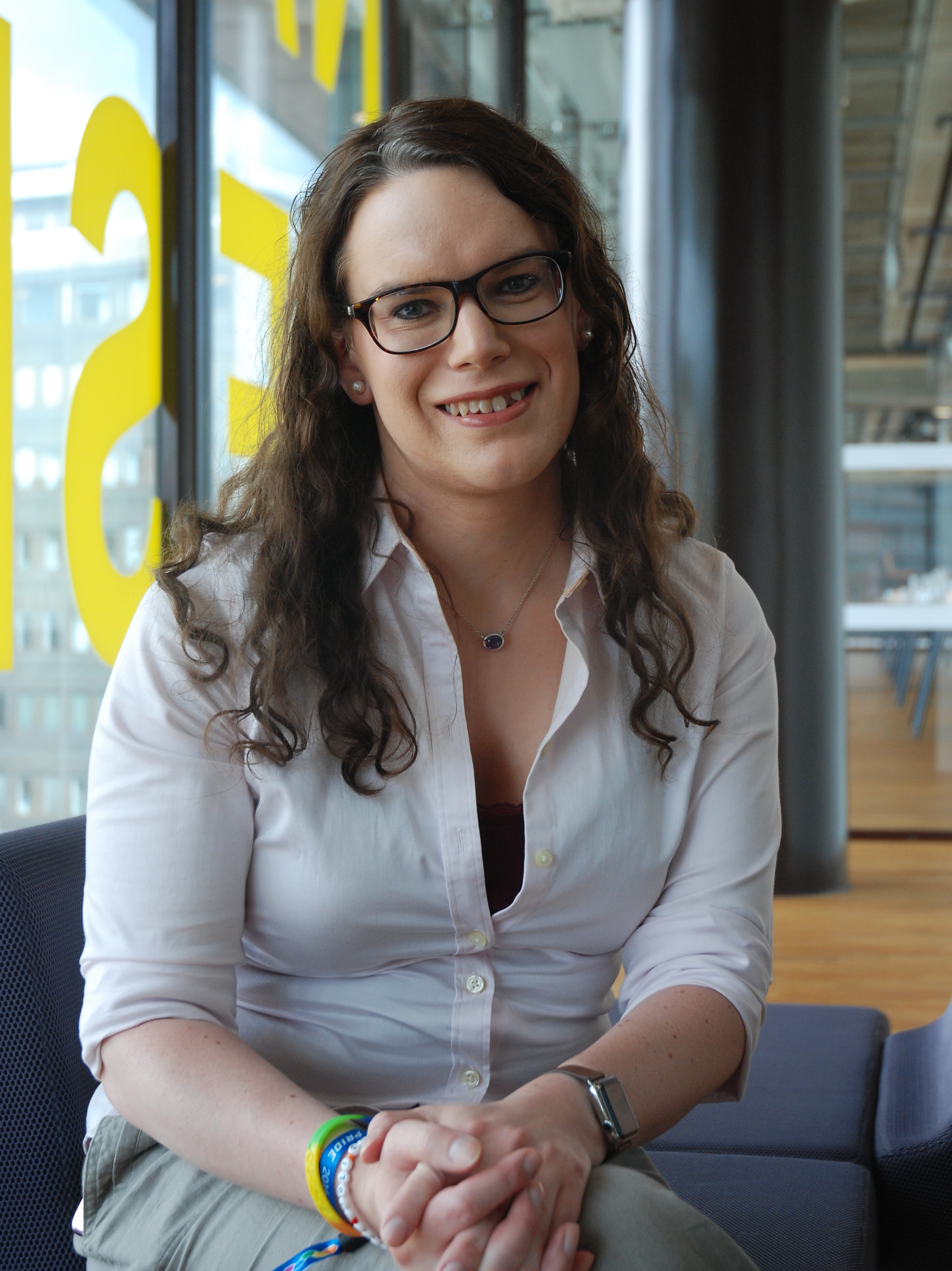
Alexandra Larsson (2016)

Alexandra Larsson (born 1974) is a retired Swedish Air Force officer and IT specialist. When she was 22, she became the first woman in the Swedish armed forces to come out as transsexual. Larsson was commissioned as a lieutenant in 1996, advancing to captain (2003) and major (2011). After serving as an intelligence officer, she went on to head one of the leading IT projects at Swedish Armed Forces Headquarters.

== Biography ==
Born in Linköping in 1974, Alexandra Larsson was one of the most industrious girls at school but felt uncomfortable. From the internet, she discovered that there were others who had the same sexual feelings as hers. When she joined the Air Force, she first hid behind her uniform but then decided to open up, revealing her outlook in a power-point presentation. It made her feel much better. After coming out, she took part in the Stockholm Pride Parade, walking beside Sweden's chief of defence and the minister of defence. In connection with a 2014 conference on "Perspectives on Transgender Military Service from Around the Globe", she commented: "I’m sure their presence made 50 more people come out. That aspect of symbolic leadership is so, so important."

In addition to her military career, Larsson graduated in political science at Lund University. She is a founding member of HoF (Homo-, bi- och transpersoner i försvaret), the Swedish armed forces LGBT association where she now sits on the board. She has also been an active member of RFSL, Sweden's LGBTQ association.

Larsson retired from the armed forces in 2017 and now works for Combitech AB where she is Chief Information Architect & Head of Ecosystem Facilitation.
