= Peter Larsen (media scholar) =

Danish professor

Peter Larsen (born 1943) is professor of media studies at the University of Bergen, Norway.

Larsen's research areas include textual and sociohistorical studies of older as well as newer visual media. His theoretical and analytical work is informed by linguistics, semiotics, psychoanalysis and recent advances in rhetoric.

Larsen was director of Photography in Culture, a national research project funded by the Norwegian Research Council (2003–2007). In recent years, he has published a number of books and articles on photo theory and photo history.

== Biography ==
Peter Larsen is a Danish citizen, born in Elsinore in 1943. He studied Scandinavian Languages and Literature at the University of Copenhagen (1962–1972) and has a degree in Film Studies as well.

After graduation, he worked as associate professor in textual studies at Roskilde University. In 1978, he became associate professor at Department of Comparative Literature, University of Copenhagen, with special responsibility for media studies. In 1988, he moved to Norway to become professor of mass communication and media studies at the Department of Information Science and Media Studies, University of Bergen. He has been professor emeritus in Bergen since 2013.

In addition to his scholarly works, Larsen has written extensively for the general audience. He worked as columnist for Danish newspapers in the 1980s and he has been a music critic and columnist at the Norwegian newspaper Bergens Tidende since 1993.

He is married to Karin Grüner Larsen, former Head Librarian at Bergen Academy of Art and Design.

== Selected publications ==
- 1990: Imports/Exports: International Flow of Television Fiction (editor), Paris: Unesco.
- 2001: «Rhetoric, Rhetorical Analysis», in Paul B. Baltes og Neil J. Smelser (eds.): International Encyclopedia of Social and Behavioral Sciences, Amsterdam: Elsevier
- 2001: «The Sound of Images. Classical Hollywood and Music», in Ib Bondebjerg (ed.): Moving Image Culture and The Mind, Luton: University of Luton Press.
- 2003: «Urban Legends: Notes on a Theme in Early Film Theory», in Lennard Højbjerg, Peter Schepelern (eds.): Film style and story. A tribute to Torben Grodal, København: Museum Tusculanum Press
- 2005: «From Bayreuth to Los Angeles: Classical Hollywood Music and the Leitmotif Technique», in Dominique Nasta, Didier Huvelle (eds.): Le son en perspective: nouvelles recherches, Repenser le cinéma, Bruxelles: P.I.E.- Peter Lang.
- 2007: Film Music, London: Reaktion Books.
- 2009: 电影音乐, Shandong, Kina: Shandong Pictorial Publishing House.
- 2010: «The Grey Area. A Rough Guide: Television Fans, Internet Forums, and the Cultural Public Sphere», in Jostein Gripsrud (ed.): Relocating Television. Television in the Digital Context, London & New York: Routledge.
- 2010: «The Sounds of Change: Representations of Music in European Newspapers 1960-2000» (with Klaus Bruhn Jensen), in Jostein Gripsrud and Lennart Weibull (eds.): Media, Markets & Public Spheres. European Media at the Crossroads, London; Intellect.
- 2011: «Mediated Fictions», in Klaus Bruhn Jensen (ed.): A Handbook of Media and Communication Research. Qualitative and Quantitative Methodologies, London & New York: Routledge.
- 2013: Ibsen og fotografene. 1800-tallets visuelle kultur[Ibsen and the photographers. 19th Century Visual Culture], Oslo: Universitetsforlaget.
- 2014: «1939-1969 Norwegian Photography», in The History of European Photography 1939-1967. Bratislava: Central European House of Photography, 2014.
- 2014: «From Figure to Figuration. On Film and Rhetoric», in Jens Elmelund Kjeldsen, Jan Grue (eds.): Scandinavian Studies in Rhetoric. Ödåkra: Retorikförlaget.
- 2016: «Text», in Klaus Bruhn Jensen, Robert T. Craig (eds.): The International Encyclopedia of Communication Theory and Philosophy, Oxford: Wiley-Blackwell.
- 2016: Rhetorical Analysis, in James D. Wright (ed.): International Encyclopedia of the Social & Behavioral Sciences, Second Edition, Oxford: Elsevier.

== Notes ==
1. https://www4.uib.no/en/find-employees/Peter.Larsen.
2.
