= Justice Larson =

Justice Larson may refer to:

- Edward Larson (Kansas judge) (born 1932), associate justice of the Kansas Supreme Court
- Jerry L. Larson (1936–2018), associate justice of the Iowa Supreme Court
- Martin M. Larson (1885–1961), associate justice of the Utah Supreme Court
- Robert L. Larson (1898–1986), associate justice of the Iowa Supreme Court
- Rolf Larsen (1934–2014), associate justice of the Supreme Court of Pennsylvania

== See also ==
- Judge Larson (disambiguation)
