= Senator Larson =

Senator Larson may refer to:

- Anton Larson (1873–1965), North Dakota State Senate
- Cal Larson (1930–2024), Minnesota State Senate
- Charles E. Larson (died 1937), Arizona State Senate
- Chris Larson (born 1980), Wisconsin State Senate
- Chuck Larson (born 1968), Iowa State Senate
- Dan Larson (politician) (born 1965), Minnesota State Senate
- Diane Larson (fl. 2010s), North Dakota State Senate
- Grant Larson (1933–2020), Wyoming State Senate
- J. Edwin Larson (1900–1965), Florida State Senate
- John B. Larson (born 1948), Connecticut State Senate
- Lane Larson (born 1957), Montana State Senate
- Liz Larson (fl. 2020s–present), South Dakota State Senate
- Morgan Foster Larson (1882–1961), New Jersey State Senate
- Richard R. Larson (Illinois politician) (1907–1985), Illinois State Senate
- Richard R. Larson (Wyoming politician) (1928–2016), Wyoming State Senate
- Tim Larson (born 1958), Connecticut State Senate
- Thomas C. Larson (1909–2007), Iowa State Senate
- Tyson Larson (born 1986), Nebraska State Senate

== See also ==
- Senator Larsen (disambiguation)
