= August Larson =

United States Marine Corps general

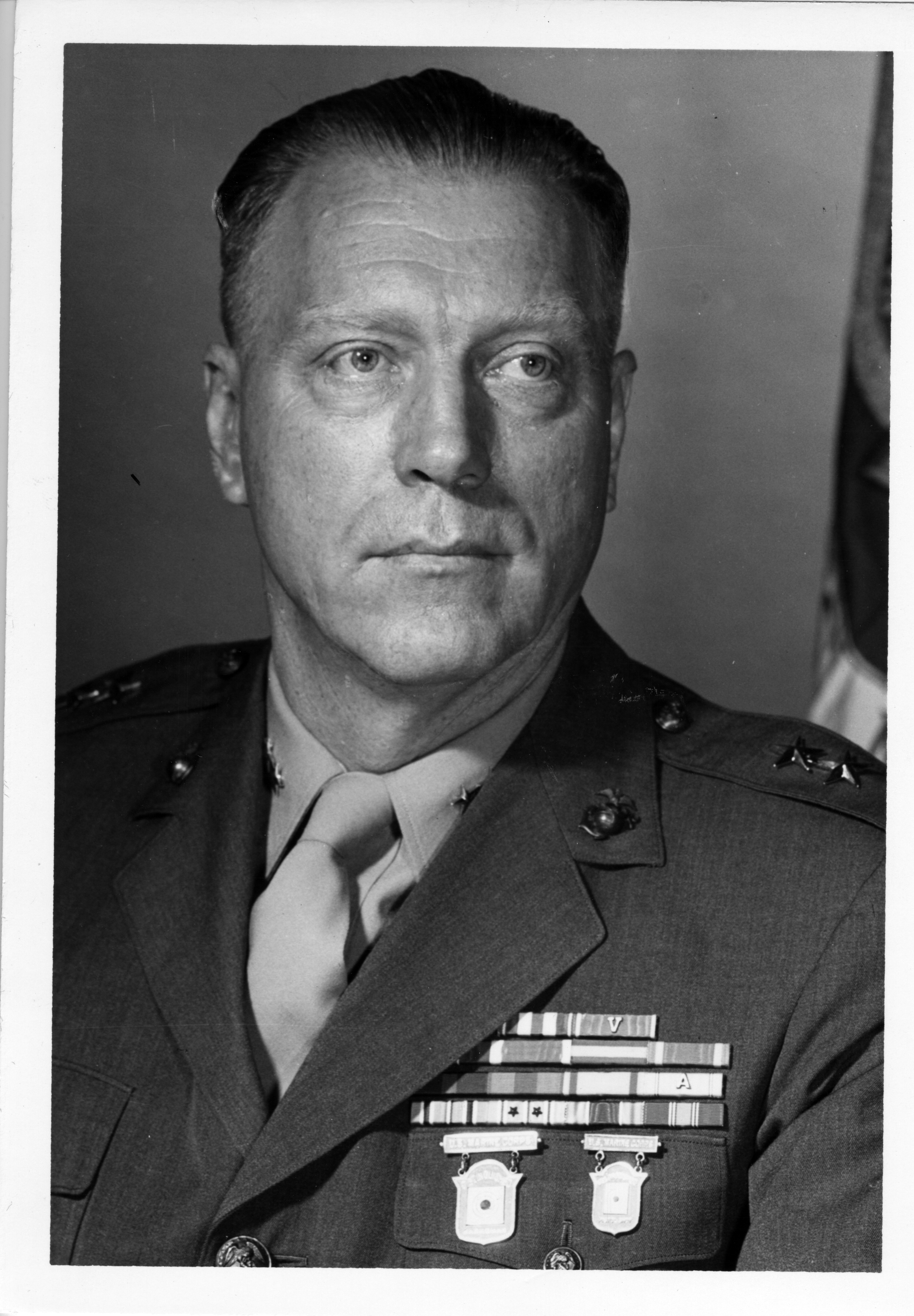
- MG August Larson, USMC
- Born: July 2, 1904; Sherburn, Minnesota, U.S.
- Died: November 4, 1981 (aged 77); Annandale, Virginia, U.S.
- Military career
- Allegiance: United States of America
- Branch: United States Marine Corps
- Service years: 1928–1963
- Rank: Major general
- Nickname: "Gus"
- Service number: 0-4615
- Commands: Personnel, HQMC; 5th Marine Regiment; 22nd Marine Regiment
- Conflicts: Yangtze Patrol; World War II: Recapture of Guam; Battle of Okinawa; Chinese Civil War
- Awards: Silver Star; Legion of Merit; Bronze Star Medal; Purple Heart

August Larson (July 2, 1904 – November 4, 1981) was a highly decorated officer of the United States Marine Corps with the rank of major general, who is most noted for his service as commanding officer of 22nd Marine Regiment during the Battle of Okinawa and later as director of personnel at Headquarters Marine Corps.

== Early career ==
August Larson was born on July 2, 1904, in Sherburn, Minnesota, and attended high school there. Following graduation in 1922, he enrolled at the University of Minnesota, where he studied for three years. Larson left college and enlisted in the Marine Corps on January 13, 1928. He served three years as enlisted rank and reached the rank of NCO. Larson was attached to the NCO meritorious program and also received the Good Conduct Medal for his "exemplary behavior and efficiency".

Upon receiving his commission of second lieutenant on February 26, 1931, Larson was sent to the Basic School at Philadelphia Navy Yard for his officer training. After one year of studies, he was attached to the 4th Marine Regiment under Colonel Emile P. Moses and sailed for China in December 1932. Larson took part in the guard duties at Shanghai International Settlement and later attended the Russian language course there.

In September 1934, he was attached to the Marine detachment aboard the cruiser USS Augusta under then-Captain Chester W. Nimitz and took part in cruises to the Dutch East Indies and Australia. Larson returned to the United States in November 1935, and after a brief leave he was ordered to the Marine Base Quantico, Virginia, where he took part in the training of the Marine detachment for President's Roosevelt residence at Warm Springs, Georgia.

In May 1936 he was assigned to the Junior Course at Marine Corps Schools Quantico. Following his graduation, he was attached to the 5th Marine Regiment under Colonel Samuel M. Harrington. During his time at Quantico, Larson was a member of the Marine Corps Rifle and Pistol Team and later coached the team in 1938 and 1939. He was ordered to the course at Ordnance Field Service School at Raritan Arsenal in Metuchen, New Jersey, during September 1939 and graduated in December of that year.

== World War II ==
Following Christmas in 1939, Larson joined the Sea School Detachment at Norfolk Navy Yard and then assumed command of the Marine detachment aboard the aircraft carrier USS Wasp under Captain John W. Reeves. While aboard this ship, he took part in the maneuvers off the coast of Guantánamo Bay and Culebra, Puerto Rico.

Larson was succeeded by his deputy, first lieutenant Ronald R. Van Stockum, and ordered back to Quantico in February 1942 and assigned to the staff Commandant of Marine Corps Schools, Brigadier General Samuel M. Harrington. He served under his old superior until March 1944 and took part in the training of new marine officers. During his time there, he reached the rank of lieutenant colonel and also attended Command and Staff course. This non-combat job did not satisfy him and requested combat duty, which was granted.

He was ordered to the Pacific area at the beginning of April 1944 and was attached to 1st Provisional Marine Brigade at Guadalcanal, which had just been activated under the command of Brigadier General Lemuel C. Shepherd. Larson was appointed assistant chief of staff for supply and took part in the Amphibious landing on Guam in July 1944, during which his brigade assisted in mop-up operations for a month. He distinguished himself in this capacity and received the Legion of Merit with Combat "V" for his service on Guam.

After the 1st Marine Brigade was reorganized as 6th Marine Division in September 1944, Larson remained in the same capacity with the unit. The 6th Division underwent "rugged" training on Guadalcanal between October 1944 and January 1945 and was attached to the III Marine Amphibious Corps for the Battle of Okinawa.

Larson landed on Okinawa at the beginning of April 1945 and distinguished himself again in coordinating the supply of material and ammunition to the front line units. He received the Bronze Star Medal with Combat "V" for his efforts.

Tough Japanese resistance halted the advance of 22nd Marine Regiment. Division Commander General Shepherd was not satisfied with the progress of the regiment and relieved regimental commander, Colonel Merlin F. Schneider and his executive officer, Lieutenant Colonel Karl K. Louther. Shepherd appointed highly decorated Colonel Harold C. Roberts as new regimental commander and Larson as his executive officer on May 17, 1945.

The 22nd Regiment fought its way up Sugar Loaf Hill, which was an elevated position dominating the battlefield. Colonel Roberts was killed by a Japanese sniper on June 18 and Larson assumed the command of the regiment as senior officer present. He personally conducted several reconnaissance mission in the front line positions and was slightly wounded. He helped to reorganize a badly-depleted battalion of the regiment. Okinawa was declared secured few days later, on June 22.

For his gallantry in action, Larson was decorated with the Silver Star, the third-highest personal decoration for valor in combat. he also received the Purple Heart for his wounds.

== Later career ==
He resumed his duties as an executive officer on June 22, 1945, and spent the next several months on Guam, where the 6th Marine Division underwent preparations for future combat deployment. The Surrender of Japan in August 1945 changed those plans. The 22nd Marines were ordered to Qingdao, China at the beginning of October 1945 in order to repatriate Japanese soldiers and nationals back to Japan.

When 22nd Marines were deactivated at the end of March 1946, Larson remained in China and was transferred to Beiping, where he was appointed commanding officer of the 5th Marine Regiment. He was also promoted to the rank of colonel at the same time. In this capacity, he supervised the removal of Marine units of his regiment from China, and the handover of some areas to Nationalist Chinese government.

Larson returned to the U. S. in August 1946 and received the Chinese Special Breast Order of Yun Hui for his service during the repatriation of Japanese. He did not stay long without assignment. His old superior, Major General Shepherd, served as commanding officer of Troop Training Unit, Amphibious Training Command, U.S. Atlantic Fleet at Little Creek, Virginia, and appointed Larson Assistant Chief of Staff for Supply.

In March 1949 he attended the Logistics course at Command and General Staff College at Fort Leavenworth, Kansas, and then a course at the Naval War College at Newport, Rhode Island. In June 1950, Larson was appointed Marine Corps liaison officer within Logistics Plans Division in the Office of Chief of Naval Operations under Admiral William Fechteler. He then served in the same capacity in the office of Secretary of Joint Chiefs of Staff until summer of 1953.

He left Washington in August 1953, when Commandant of the Marine Corps and his old superior, Lemuel C. Shepherd, established the Advanced Research Group at Quantico within the Marine Corps Schools. This group was tasked with the development of the recommendations on how the MAGTF should evolve structurally to meet the challenges of atomic warfare and new technologies such as helicopters and jet aircraft. The members of the group were Thomas J. Coolley, John P. Condon, Joseph N. Renner, Carson A. Roberts, Samuel R. Shaw, George R. E. Shell, Eustace R. Smoak, William J. Van Ryzin, and Richard G. Weede.

During July 1955, Larson was transferred to the California and appointed deputy commander of Camp Pendleton under Major General George F. Good. In this capacity he was co-responsible for the training of new recruits and finally received promotion to the rank of brigadier general on July 1, 1956.

Larson was ordered to Okinawa in July 1957 and appointed assistant division commander, 3rd Marine Division under Major General Francis M. McAlister. He took part in defense duties in the Far East until June 1958.

Following his return, Larson served briefly as deputy chief of staff for research and development, before being appointed director of personnel in August 1958. He was promoted to the rank of major general in August 1959 and served in that capacity until November 1962. He was succeeded by Major General Lewis J. Fields and spent next four months assigned to the Headquarters Marine Corps.

Larson retired from active duty on February 1, 1963, after 35 years of active service. He settled in Annandale, Virginia, and died there on November 4, 1981. General Larson is buried at Arlington National Cemetery, Virginia, together with his wife, Alice Kennedy Larson (1915–2011).

== Decorations ==
This is the ribbon bar of Major General August Larson:

1st Row	Silver Star		Legion of Merit with Combat "V"	Bronze Star Medal with Combat "V"
2nd Row	Purple Heart	Navy Presidential Unit Citation	Navy Unit Commendation	Marine Corps Good Conduct Medal
3rd Row	Marine Corps Expeditionary Medal	China Service Medal	American Defense Service Medal with "A" Device	American Campaign Medal
4th Row	Asiatic-Pacific Campaign Medal with two 3/16 inch service stars	World War II Victory Medal	National Defense Service Medal with one star	Chinese Special Breast Order of Yun Hui
