= Progressive Conservative Party of Manitoba candidates in the 2003 Manitoba provincial election =

The Progressive Conservative Party of Manitoba fielded a full slate of 57 candidates in the 2003 provincial election, and won 20 seats to remain as the Official Opposition party in the Legislative Assembly of Manitoba. Many of the party's candidates have their own biography pages; information about others may be found here.

== Larry Maguire (Arthur-Virden) ==
Larry Maguire, the incumbent MLA, was re-elected in a field of three candidates with 4,135 votes (53.81%).

== Dennis Wishanski (Assiniboia) ==
Wishanski was a banker for twenty-five years before starting a graphics design firm with his wife. He supported standardized tests for provincial schools during the 1990s, and was elected to the St. James-Assiniboia School Board in 1998. In 2001, he supported a theatre construction project at Sturgeon Creek Collegiate.

Wishanski did not seek re-election in 2002, choosing to campaign for a provincial seat. He defeated Grant Nordman, son of former MLA Ric Nordman, to win the 2003 Progressive Conservative nomination for Assiniboia. In the general election, he received 2,257 votes (27.65%) for a second-place finish against New Democratic Party incumbent Jim Rondeau. Wishanski was 55 years old.

Electoral record
| Election | Division | Party | Votes | % | Place | Winner |
|---|---|---|---|---|---|---|
| 1998 Winnipeg municipal | St. James-Assiniboia School Board; Silver Heights-Booth Ward | n/a | 3,476 | 18.82 | 3/6 | Ron Marshall, Sandra Paterson-Greene, and himself |
| 2003 provincial | Assiniboia | Progressive Conservative | 2,257 | 27.65 | 2/4 | Jim Rondeau, New Democratic Party |

== Greg Dinsdale (Brandon East) ==
Dinsdale comes from a prominent political family in Brandon. His father Walter Dinsdale was a Progressive Conservative member of the House of Commons of Canada from 1951 to 1982, and his grandfather George Dinsdale was a Member of the Legislative Assembly and Mayor of Brandon. Dinsdale is a teacher, and is active with the Manitoba Teachers' Society and the Salvation Army.

Dinsdale first campaigned for the Manitoba legislature in 1995 at age 43, and finished second against veteran legislator Leonard Evans. He served on the Brandon University board during the 1990s, and was vice-chair for a time. He considered running for the Conservative Party nomination in Brandon—Souris for the 2004 federal election, but declined.

Electoral record
| Election | Division | Party | Votes | % | Place | Winner |
|---|---|---|---|---|---|---|
| 1995 provincial | Brandon East | Progressive Conservative | 2,608 | 31.91 | 2/3 | Leonard Evans, New Democratic Party |
| 2003 provincial | Brandon East | Progressive Conservative | 2,036 | 32.64 | 2/4 | Drew Caldwell, New Democratic Party |

== Reg Atkinson (Brandon West) ==
Reg Atkinson, a former Mayor of Brandon, received 2,982 votes (34.93%) for a second-place finish against New Democratic Party incumbent Scott Smith.

== Derek Lambert (Burrows) ==
Lambert was a youth delegate to the Progressive Conservative Party of Manitoba's 2001 convention. He voted against the party's "one member, one vote" system for deciding a leader, expressing concern that the party could be hijacked by unrepresentative groups. He received 423 votes (7.29%) in 2003, finishing third against New Democratic Party of Manitoba incumbent Doug Martindale.

== Conor Lloyd (Concordia) ==
Lloyd was raised in Selkirk. He campaigned for a seat on the Selkirk City Council in the 2002 municipal campaign, but was unsuccessful. He then challenged Manitoba Premier Gary Doer in the 2003 provincial election, and finished a distant second in the north Winnipeg division of Concordia. In 2004, he was the provincial youth chair of Belinda Stronach's bid to lead the Conservative Party of Canada.

Lloyd later became a spokesperson for the Manitoba Métis Federation, and in 2005 announced that the MMF would rescind an honour they had planned to give Premier Doer due to disagreements over harvester rights. In 2006, he supported Ron Schuler's bid to lead the Progressive Conservative Party of Manitoba.

Electoral record
| Election | Division | Party | Votes | % | Place | Winner |
|---|---|---|---|---|---|---|
| 2002 Selkirk municipal | City Council | n/a | 1,112 | 7.38 | 9/13 | Pat Pruden, Chris Pawley, John Buffie, Darlene Swiderski, Duane Nicol and Marlene Cook |
| 2003 provincial | Concordia | Progressive Conservative | 935 | 16.11 | 2/3 | Gary Doer, New Democratic Party |

== Virginia Larsson (Rossmere) ==
A social conservative, Larsson was an advocate for children to have the choice of having one mother and one father in cases of adoption and a member of REAL Women. She finished second with 2,296 votes, against 5,057 for Harry Schellenberg of the New Democratic Party.

== E. Ray Garnett (St. Johns) ==
In 2002, the Winnipeg Free Press newspaper published a story about a Winnipeg resident named Ray Garnett, who was pressuring the province of Manitoba to change its laws to allow him to sue a doctor he believed had ruined his life through a misdiagnosis. Garnett was diagnosed in 1989 with kidney failure, which he believed was the result of having taken the drug lithium for twenty years. The Minister of Justice at the time was Gord Mackintosh, who expressed reluctance to intervene until existing legal avenues had been tried (Winnipeg Free Press, 7 December 2002). It may be reasonable to assume this was the same person as the candidate.

Garnett received 612 votes (10.49%), finishing third against Mackintosh, the incumbent candidate for the New Democratic Party.

== Jason Shaw (Swan River) ==
Shaw lists himself as an investment advisor, and has campaigned for public office on two occasions. He sought the Canadian Alliance nomination for Brandon—Souris in the 2000 federal election, but lost to Gary Nestibo (Winnipeg Free Press, 22 October 2000). He subsequently won the party's nomination for the northern riding of Churchill, and finished third.

Electoral record
| Election | Division | Party | Votes | % | Place | Winner |
|---|---|---|---|---|---|---|
| 2000 federal | Churchill | Canadian Alliance | 4,126 | 17.70 | 3/4 | Bev Desjarlais, New Democratic Party |
| 2003 provincial | Swan River | Progressive Conservative | 2,223 | 29.79 | 2/3 | Rosann Wowchuk, New Democratic Party |

== Nansy Marsiglia (Transcona) ==
Marsiglia has a Bachelor of Arts degree from the University of Manitoba, majoring in Foreign Language and minoring in Psychology. She operated a family business called Torino Tile at the time of the election, and has also worked at an upmarket clothing store for children. She received 915 votes (14.40%), finishing third against New Democratic Party incumbent Daryl Reid.

== Ashley Burner (Wolseley) ==
Burner received 679 votes (11.09%), finishing fourth against New Democratic Party candidate Rob Altemeyer.

== Wyatt McIntyre (Point Douglas) ==
Wyatt T. McIntyre (born 16 July 1980 in Valleyview, Alberta) is a Canadian political strategist, author and political activist.

McIntyre ran as a candidate of the Manitoba Progressive Conservative Party in the 2003 Manitoba election, and finished third in the north-end Winnipeg constituency of Point Douglas with 337 votes (8.37%). The winner was George Hickes of the New Democratic Party.

McIntyre also ran as a candidate under the Alberta First Party banner in the 2001 Alberta general election as a candidate in Calgary-Fort.
