= Joanne Larson =

Joanne C. Larson is an American education scholar. She is the Michael W. Scandling Professor of Education at the University of Rochester's Warner School of Education and Human Development and associate director of research at the university's Center for Urban Education Success. Her research is in New Literacy Studies and focuses on language and literacy practices in elementary and urban classrooms, particularly their relationship to social relations, power, and participation in literacy events. Her more recent work has drawn on Michel Foucault's concept of heterotopia and on critical geography to examine the relationship between space and literacy.

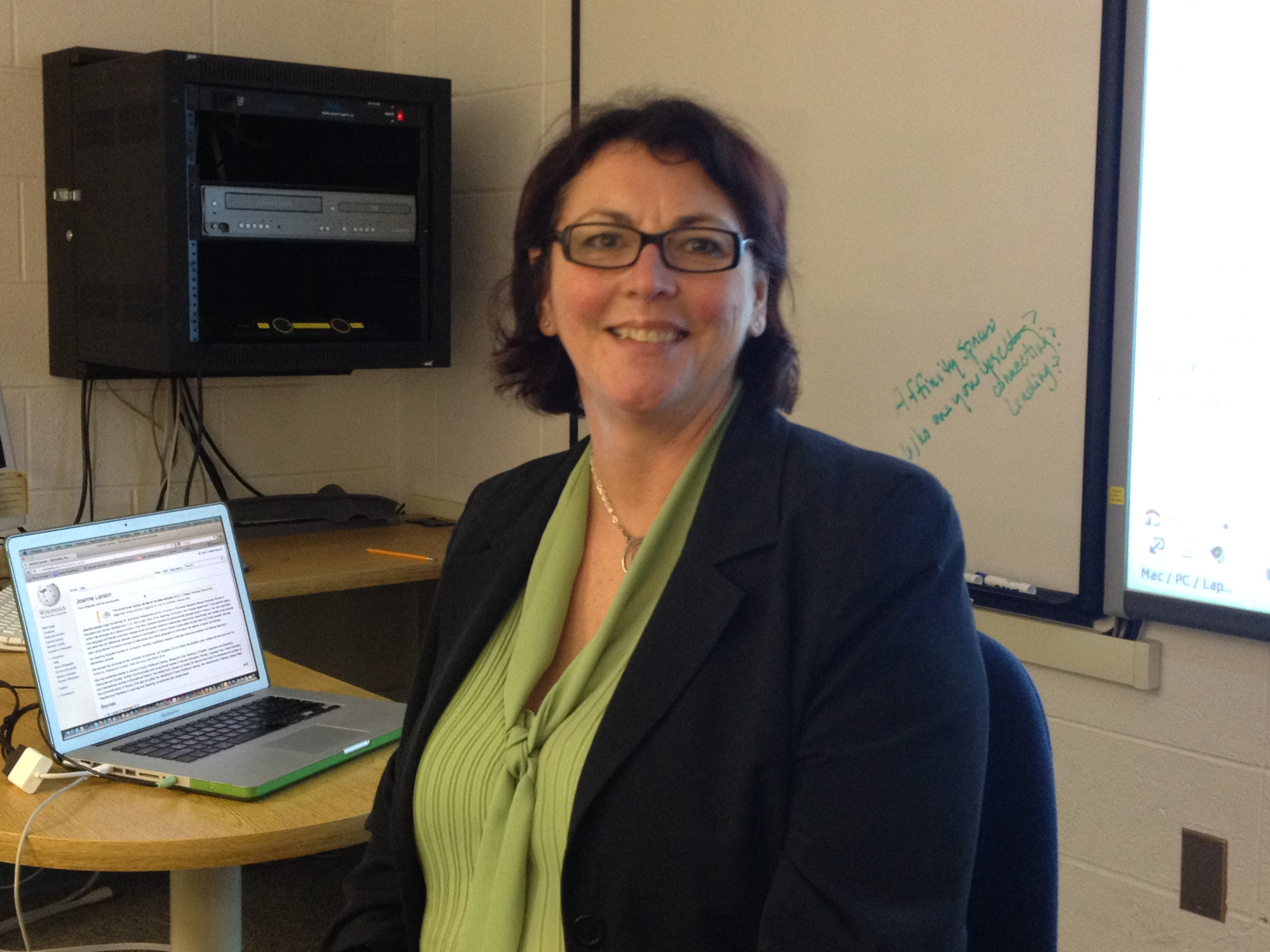
Professor Joanne C. Larson

== Career ==
Larson joined the Warner School faculty in 1995. In 2007, the University of Rochester announced her appointment as the Michael W. Scandling Professor of Education. She has served as chair of the teaching and curriculum program and as associate director of research at the Center for Urban Education Success.

== Research and teaching ==
Larson's scholarship focuses on literacy, ethnography, and education. According to the University of Rochester, her research examines how language and literacy practices mediate social and power relations in literacy events in schools and communities. Since 2014, she has conducted a long-term participatory ethnography with teachers, administrators, and students at East High School in Rochester as part of the university's Educational Partnership Organization.

Larson teaches courses on curriculum, diversity, qualitative research methods, discourse analysis, and literacy learning in elementary schools.

== Education ==
Larson received a Bachelor of Arts in fine arts and a PhD in curriculum from the University of California, Los Angeles. She studied under Kris Gutierrez, Alessandro Duranti, Peter McLaren, and Elinor Ochs.

She has published articles in Journal of Early Childhood Literacy, Research in the Teaching of English, Linguistics and Education, Discourse and Society, Written Communication and co-authored articles in Harvard Education Review, Language Arts, Urban Education and International Journal of Educational Reform. Her edited book Literacy as Snake Oil: Beyond the Quick Fix addresses the problem of the commodification of literacy. She also co-edited the Handbook of Early Childhood Literacy. Her newest book is Making Literacy Real: Theories and Practices in Learning and Teaching, co-authored with Jackie Marsh.
