= Kate Larson =

Kate Larson may refer to:

- Kate Larson (computer scientist), Canadian computer scientist
- Kate Larson (historian), American historian and Harriet Tubman scholar
- Kate Larson (writer) (1961–2018), Swedish writer

== See also ==
- Kate Larsen, fictional character on New Zealand soap opera Shortland Street
- Katherine Larson, American poet, molecular biologist and field ecologist
