= Johan Larsson i Örbyhus =

Swedish politician (1877–1947)

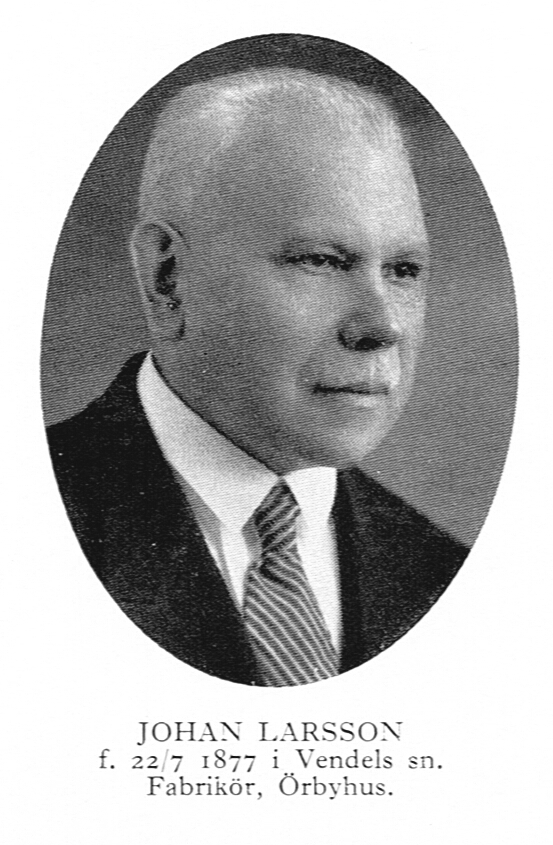
Portrait of Johan Larsson

Johan Larsson (born 22 July 1877 in Vendel, died 26 February 1947 in Vendel) was a Swedish businessman and politician. He was a member of the upper house of the bicameral Swedish parliament from 1929 to 1938, representing the Free-minded People's Party and, from 1934, the People's Party, for the Stockholm County and Uppsala County electoral district. He was a member of the parliamentary Committee on Banking and the Committee of Ways and Means.

According to the tradition in the Swedish parliament, he was referred to as Johan Larsson i Örbyhus in order to differentiate him from other members of parliament called Johan Larsson. Larsson was also a member of Uppsala County Council between 1925 and 1942. In 1893, Larsson founded a ski manufacturing business in his home in Vendel. His brother Lars Erik joined the business in 1895, and in 1905 when their production exceeded 3,000 pairs of skis per year, the brothers built a ski factory in Örbyhus, called Bröderna Larssons Snickeri- & Skidfabrik, AB. The factory existed until 1952.

Larsson died in a fire in his home on 26 February 1947, aged 69.
