= Susanna Larsson =

Swedish epidemiologist

Susanna C. Larsson is a Swedish epidemiologist. She is associate professor at the Institute of Environmental Medicine at the Karolinska Institutet, Stockholm, Sweden. She is currently also associated with the Neurology Unit, University of Cambridge, where she is part of a group engaged in a study on the effect of diet on stroke risk.

== Life ==
She graduated from Stockholm University, and Karolinska Institutet, Stockholm, Sweden. She did post-doctoral work at National Institute for Health and Welfare, Helsinki, Finland. She has been lead author for a number of major meta-analyses and reviews.

== Selected works ==
- Larsson, Susanna C.; Giovannucci, Edward; Wolk, Alicja (2006-11-21). "Dietary Carbohydrate, Glycemic Index, and Glycemic Load in Relation to Risk of Colorectal Cancer in Women". American Journal of Epidemiology. 165 (3): 256–261. doi:10.1093/aje/kwk012. ISSN 0002-9262. PMID 17118965.
- Larsson, Susanna C.; Virtamo, Jarmo; Wolk, Alicja (2012-01-01). "Chocolate consumption and risk of stroke: A prospective cohort of men and meta-analysis". Neurology. 79 (12): 1223–1229. doi:10.1212/WNL.0b013e31826aacfa. ISSN 0028-3878. PMID 22933736. S2CID 42426441.
- Larsson, Susanna C.; Virtamo, Jarmo; Wolk, Alicja (2013-03-01). "Black tea consumption and risk of stroke in women and men". Annals of Epidemiology. 23 (3): 157–160. doi:10.1016/j.annepidem.2012.12.006. ISSN 1047-2797. PMID 23295000.
- Larsson, Susanna C; Drca, Nikola; Björck, Martin; Bäck, Magnus; Wolk, Alicja (2018-03-21). "Nut consumption and incidence of seven cardiovascular diseases". Heart. 104 (19): 1615–1620. doi:10.1136/heartjnl-2017-312819. ISSN 1355-6037. PMC 6161661. PMID 29661934.
