= Thomas Larson =

Tom or Thomas Larson may refer to:

- Thomas C. Larson (1909–2007), American politician from Iowa
- Thomas D. Larson (1928–2006), American politician from Pennsylvania
- Tom Larson (sportscaster), American sportscaster
- Tom Larson (Wisconsin politician) (1948–2017)

== See also ==
- Tom Larsen (born 1972), Norwegian cyclist
