= Carson Abel Roberts =

American Marine Corps general (1905–1983)

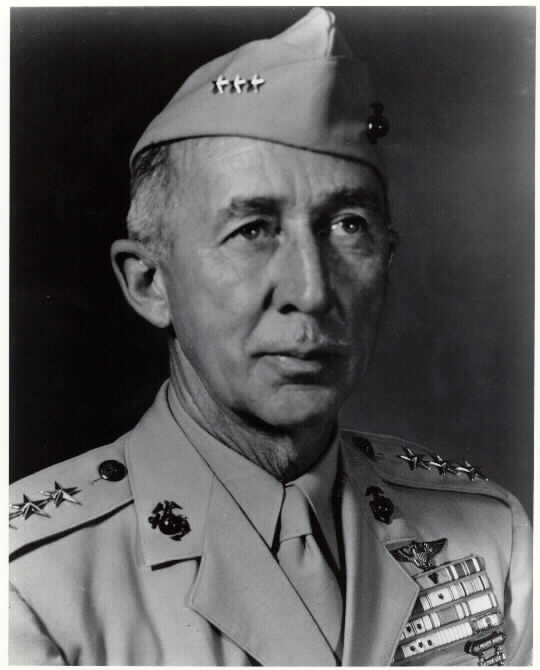
- Born: September 4, 1905; Lancaster, Wisconsin, U.S.
- Died: December 19, 1983 (aged 78); Pinehurst, North Carolina, U.S.
- Burial place: Arlington National Cemetery
- Military career
- Allegiance: United States of America
- Branch: United States Marine Corps
- Service years: 1929–1964
- Rank: Lieutenant general
- Commands: MAG-33; 1st Marine Aircraft Wing; 3rd Marine Aircraft Wing; Fleet Marine Force, Pacific
- Conflicts: World War II: Gilbert and Marshall Islands campaign; Mariana and Palau Islands campaign; Battle of Okinawa; Korean War
- Awards: Navy Distinguished Service Medal; Legion of Merit; Distinguished Flying Cross; Bronze Star

Carson Abel Roberts (September 4, 1905 – December 19, 1983) was a lieutenant general in the United States Marine Corps.

== Biography ==
Roberts was born on September 4, 1905, in Lancaster, Wisconsin. He graduated from high school in Madison, Wisconsin, and obtained a B.D. in philosophy from the University of Wisconsin-Madison. Roberts married Evelyn Gresham, who died in 1977. He died on December 19, 1983, in Pinehurst, North Carolina, and is buried with Evelyn at Arlington National Cemetery.

== Career ==
Roberts joined the Marines in 1929. In 1934, he was designated an aviator. During World War II, he served with Marine Aircraft Group 11 and the 4th Marine Aircraft Wing. Following the war, he was named assistant chief of staff of the 1st Marine Aircraft Wing. Later he commanded the Marine Corps Air Station Eagle Mountain Lake.

During the Korean War, he served as deputy chief of staff of the 1st Marine Aircraft Wing, later becoming chief of staff. He also commanded Marine Aircraft Group 33. From 1952 to 1953, he served as chief of staff of aircraft of the Fleet Marine Force, Atlantic. Later he was named assistant commander of Marine Corps Air Station Quantico. He served as inspector general of the Marine Corps and as director of armed forces information and education with the United States Department of Defense.

In 1957, he became deputy chief of staff of plans at the headquarters of the Marine Corps. From there, he became commanding general of the 1st Marine Aircraft Wing and the 3rd Marine Aircraft Wing. Later he became commanding general of aircraft of the Fleet Marine Force, Pacific, before being named commander of the entire Fleet Marine Force, Pacific in 1962. His retirement was effective as of March 1, 1964.

== Awards and decorations ==
Awards he received include the Navy Distinguished Service Medal, the Legion of Merit with valor device, the Distinguished Flying Cross, the Bronze Star Medal with award star and valor device, the Presidential Unit Citation, the American Defense Service Medal with base clasp, the Asiatic-Pacific Campaign Medal with three award stars, the American Campaign Medal, the World War II Victory Medal, the China Service Medal, the National Defense Service Medal, the Korean Service Medal with four award stars, the United Nations Korea Medal, and the Republic of Korea Presidential Unit Citation.

Naval Aviator Badge
Navy Distinguished Service Medal		Legion of Merit with "V" Device	
Distinguished Flying Cross	Bronze Star with "V" device and award star	Presidential Unit Citation	American Defense Service Medal with Base Clasp
American Campaign Medal	Asiatic-Pacific Campaign Medal with three bronze stars	World War II Victory Medal	China Service Medal
National Defense Service Medal	Korean Service Medal with four bronze stars	United Nations Korea Medal	Republic of Korea Presidential Unit Citation
