= Euroradar CAPTOR =

Doppler radar designed for the Eurofighter Typhoon aircraft

Euroradar Captor
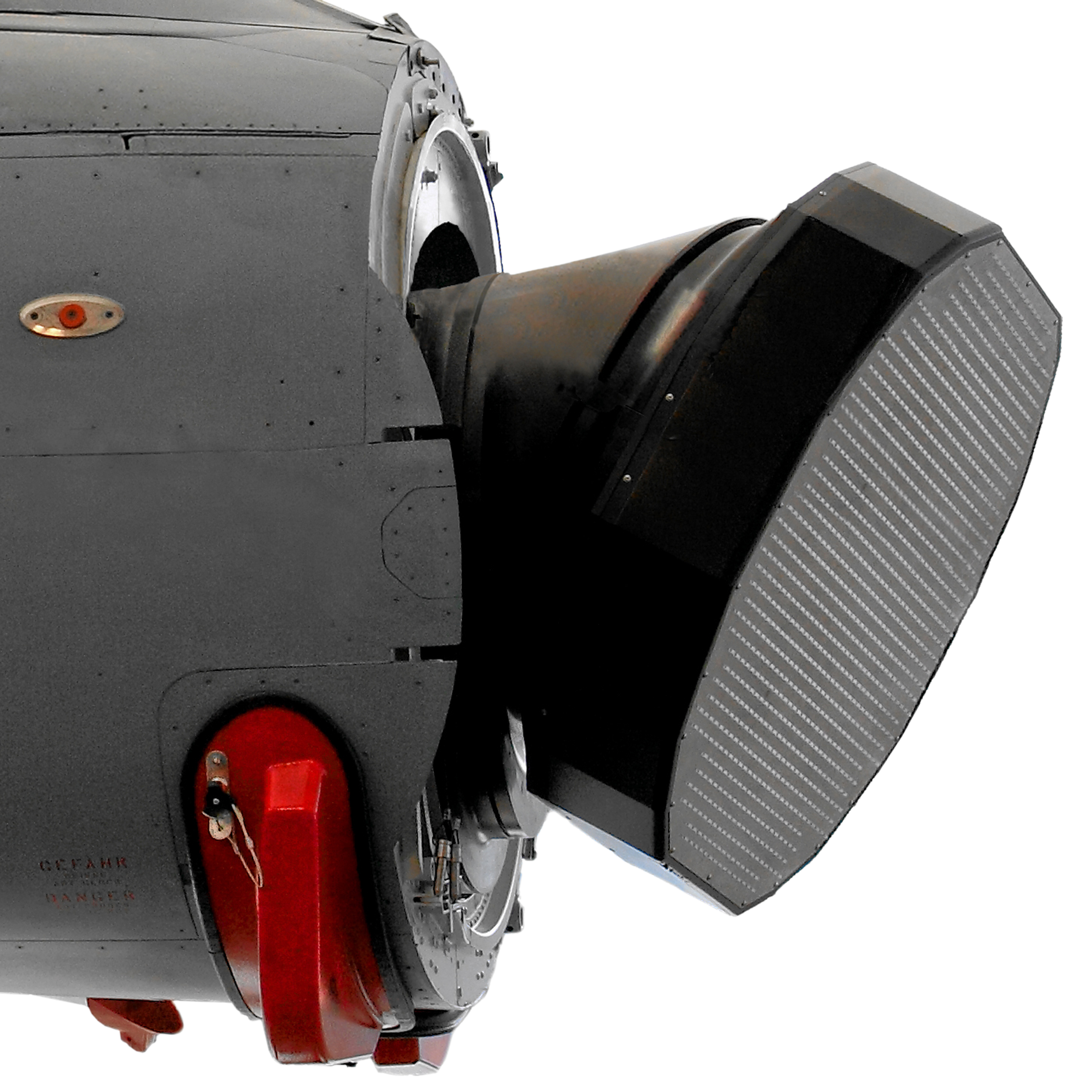
- Captor-E Demonstrator
- Country of origin: Germany, Italy, Spain, United Kingdom
- Manufacturer: Selex ES (Now Leonardo); Airbus Defence & Space; Indra Sistemas
- Type: Captor-M: Solid-state Mechanically Scanned Array (MSA); Captor-E: Active Electronically Scanned Array (AESA)
- Frequency: X-band

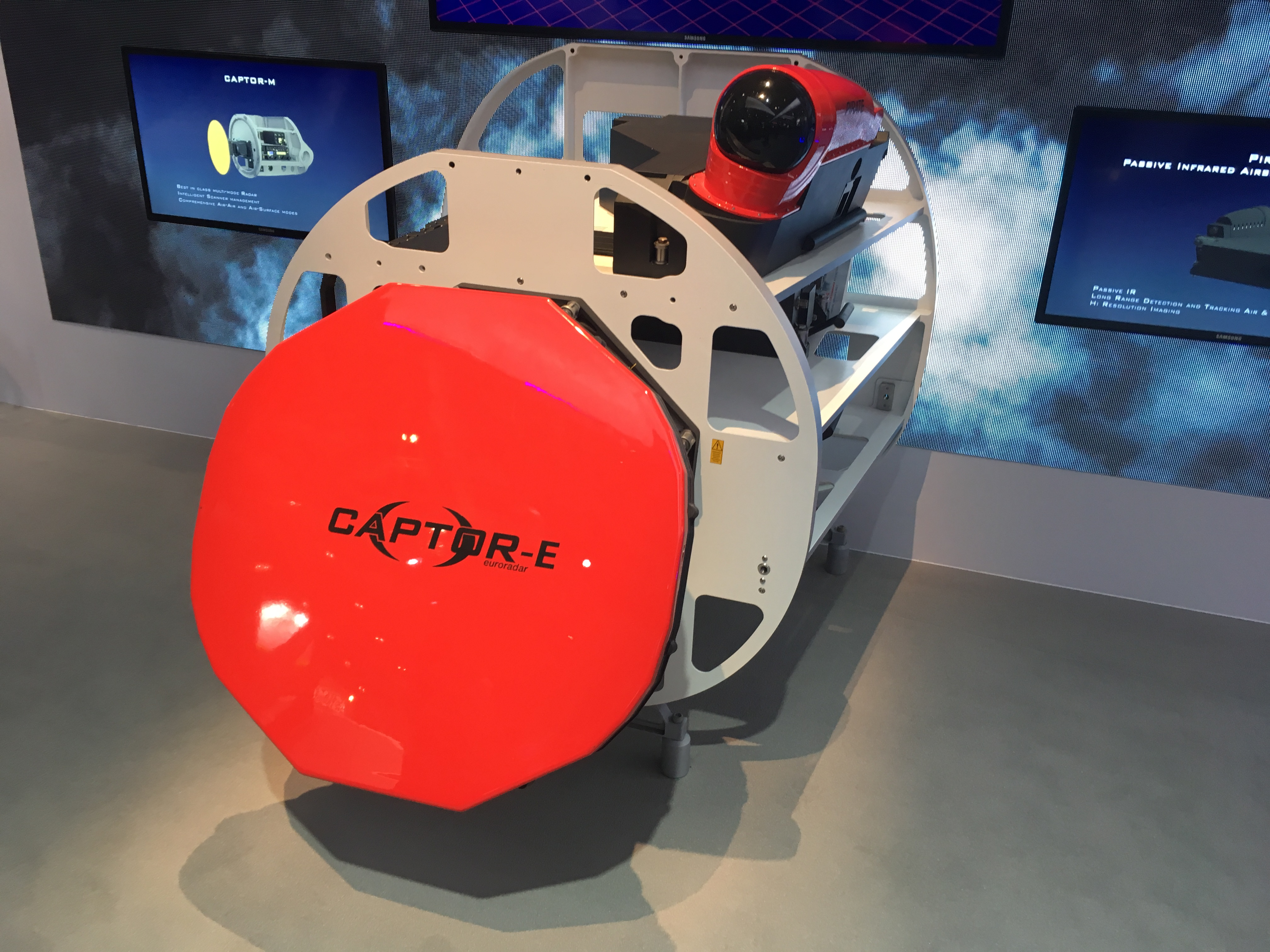
Captor-E pictured in London (2019)

The Euroradar Captor is a next-generation mechanical multi-mode Pulse Doppler Radar designed for the Eurofighter Typhoon. Development of Captor led to the AMSAR (Airborne Multirole Solid State Active Array Radar) project which eventually produced the CAESAR (Captor Active Electronically Scanned Array Radar), now known as Captor-E.

== Development ==
=== Early development ===
In June 1985, discussions began amongst various corporations to sound out the possibility of cooperation on the radar for the EFA, the project that would later become the Eurofighter. The United Kingdom chose Ferranti as the leading contract partner, Germany AEG-Telefunken and Italy FIAR. Spain, which had no radar experience, played only a minor role, later selecting Eesa as the main contractor. Towards the end of June 1985, a memorandum of understanding was signed between the UK, Germany, France, Italy and Spain to develop a joint radar for the EFA. France had already indicated at the time that it intended to withdraw from the programme. The French company Thomson-CSF was thus faced with a dilemma, as it would have liked to participate in an EFA radar. Therefore, in 1987, Thomson-CSF negotiated with Ferranti to secure a share of the work. Specifically, the travelling-wave tube was to be supplied which was possibly the same one that was to be used in the Rafale. In March 1987, Ferranti and AEG sent their offers to Eurofighter GmbH.

Ferranti presented its ECR-90, based on the Blue Vixen, as early as 1986, while AEG offered the MSD-2000 "Emerald", which was based on the AN/APG-65. Ferranti's main argument was that a European fighter aircraft should also be equipped with a European radar. Ferranti had already been working with Thompson-CSF, Inisel and FIAR on the development of the radar since 1983. France withdrew with Thompson-CSF in June 1985, followed a year later by AEG. AEG wanted to offer a system based on the APG-65, as the company already had the production licence for this. There was still speculation as to whether Thorn-EMI would offer the AN/APG-68, but this did not end up happening. Both bidders submitted two-part offers: one that fully met the tender requirements and a reduced low-cost variant. Ferranti and FIAR offered the ECR-90 and the Super Vixen, AEG and GEC Marconi the MSD-2000 and the APG-65, but both high-tech offers were too expensive and the low-cost alternatives were deemed insufficient.

As a result, a new tender was launched. This time, the performance requirements were slimmed down and the manufacturers were also asked how the costs could be reduced. The requirements were also less stringent in order to fuel the inventive spirit of the engineers. The two new tenders were submitted in February 1988:

- ECR-90: The European Collaborative Radar 90 was offered by Ferranti in the variants -90, -90A and -90B. The detection range was always the same, only the capabilities were to be integrated bit by bit. The main argument was again that the radar would account for a significant proportion of the costs of the EFA, and thus a European in-house development would enable higher added value in Europe. To reduce risk, the ECR-90 was to be based on the Blue Vixen of the BAE Sea Harrier FA2, which was already AMRAAM-capable in order to send target updates to the missiles. For the Blue Vixen, two planar antenna designs were tested: one made of a light metal alloy and one formed from an aluminised carbon fibre plate; the latter was rejected due to the higher costs and uncertainty regarding durability. The choice was left open for the ECR-90. The antenna drive was based on the Blue Vixen and PS-05 of the Saab 39, and corrected pitch and roll movements with 0.5 hp samarium-cobalt motors. There was no roll control: roll angles were compensated electronically. The coupled-cavity travelling wave tube was to be supplied by Selenia or Thomson-CSF. The signal processing and processors were taken over from the Blue Vixen. Since the software development of Blue Vixen accounted for about 80% of the development costs, and about 50% of the software for the ECR-90 was to be taken over, savings opportunities were seen here. Blue Vixen only had 11 of the required 31 radar modes. The 32-bit signal processor, however, was to be twice as fast and supplied by Hughes, IBM or Ericsson. The Blue Vixen's D80 achieved around 500 MIPS. The computing modules were housed in metal cassettes that acted as heat sinks and had air flowing through the centre. While the Blue Vixen consisted of 13,790 parts, the ECR-90 was to consist of only 13,000 parts.
- MSD-2000: The Multimode Silent Radar 2000 from AEG and GEC Marconi was based on the APG-65. This was a logical progression as the APG-65 had been planned for the EFA predecessor TKF-90, which is why the weight, volume and energy specifications of the EFA radar were also adopted from the TKF-90 program. Marconi also came to the conclusion that a new development would not be possible in the time available, which is why the APG-65 of the F-18 was accepted as the base model. The APG-65 already had 28 of the required 31 radar modes and the AMRAAM capability, meaning that 80% of the software could be adopted. A further 10% had to be reprogrammed and another 10% newly programmed. The additional programming related almost exclusively to the three missing modes "Non-Cooperative Target Recognition", "Visual Identification" and "Slaved air-to-air acquisition". In addition, the number of targets in TWS mode and the ECCM capability were to be improved. Compared to the APG-65, the antenna was to be enlarged from 68 cm to 75 cm and the radiation power doubled. The receiver sensitivity was to be increased, the antenna was to be equipped with D/F-band dipoles for a NATO IFF system, and the signal processor was to be replaced with a faster model from Marconi. New samarium-cobalt motors were planned for the antenna drive so as not to reduce the antenna speed. Although the transmitter power was to be doubled compared to the APG-65, the transmission power was always to be kept as low as possible to prevent detection. The number of plug-in cards was to be reduced from 21 to 7, but 25% of the computing and memory capacity was to remain free. The remaining 17 free slots would then be available for expansion. The radar processor was to be adopted from the AI.24 Foxhunter radar of the Tornado ADV, which was based on a 32-bit Motorola 68020, in order to double the computing power. In total, less than 15% of the radar would come from the US.

The radar software was to be programmed in Ada, as was the entire EFA software. The US was rather critical of the required technology transfer for the MSD-2000 when it was negotiated in May 1988, but nevertheless agreed to it in August of that year. The schedule now envisaged completing the first airworthy radars in 1992, as the first flight of the EFA was planned for 1991, and starting series production in 1996. Spain was now in favour of the MSD-2000, as the cost and timeframe seemed the most realistic. After October 1988, the decision was made, with Ferranti's ECR-90 winning the race but not being chosen.

Since Germany did not agree with the decision, German Defence Minister Gerhard Stoltenberg met with British Defence Secretary Tom King in mid-1989. They agreed to commission a study into whether the MSD-2000 could be adapted to British requirements after all. At the same time, the UK Ministry of Defence launched a study into how the partner countries, excluding Germany, could develop their own radar for the EFA. The MSD-2000 study was negative, but Germany still refused to give in on this issue. As no agreement could be reached after 18 months, the UK and Germany called on the industry to find a solution. In December 1989, Ferranti held talks with Telefunken System Technik (formerly AEG until Daimler took over the company) to co-operate on the ECR-90 and resolve the German resistance. At the same time, the industry warned politicians of rising costs due to the delays. Eurofighter GmbH then sent letters to all four partner countries and NETMA stating that all additional costs would be passed on to them. This was important as the EFA radar was to be awarded as a fixed-price contract and the companies involved were to be reimbursed for the delays. At the beginning of 1990, GEC Marconi, which was working on the MSD-2000, swallowed up Ferranti, which was designing the ECR-90, a decision that was underwritten by the British government. Ferranti's labs became the new GEC Ferranti in 1990, and then BAE Systems Avionics when GEC's various military electronics divisions - Ferranti, Marconi and Elliott Brothers - were merged. Plessey, which manufactured the EFA's missile detectors, was taken over by a consortium of GEC Marconi and Siemens. This signalled a relaxation on the radar front. In early 1990, GEC-Ferranti was finally declared the winner of the EFA radar competition and awarded a £300m contract. In mid-1990, GEC-Ferranti negotiated with Ericsson to remove the company from the ECR-90 Euroradar consortium and use the Motorola 68020 processors of the MSD-2000 instead. In a comparison, its signal processing proved to be significantly more powerful. This in turn was seen as a problem by Germany, as the redesign of the ECR-90 meant that delays and further cost increases were unavoidable.

Hughes sued GEC for $600 million for its role in the selection of the EFA and alleged that it used Hughes technology in the ECR-90 when it took over Ferranti. It later dropped this allegation and was awarded $23 million; the court judged that the MSD-2000 "had a real or substantial chance of succeeding had GEC not [tortiously] intervened ... and had the companies, which were bound by the Collaboration Agreement, faithfully and diligently performed their continuing obligations thereunder to press and promote the case for MSD-2000."

Since these events, further mergers have taken place in the industry. Parts of BAE Systems Avionics were merged with Galileo Avionica to form SELEX Galileo in 2005 which in turn then merged with other Finmeccanica defence electronics companies in 2013 to create Selex ES (merged in turn in Finmeccanica, rebranded Leonardo since 2017). The development effort is now organized under the Euroradar consortium, consisting primarily of Selex ES, as well as Airbus and Indra.

The ECR-90 was renamed CAPTOR when the project passed the production contract milestone.

=== Captor-E AESA ===
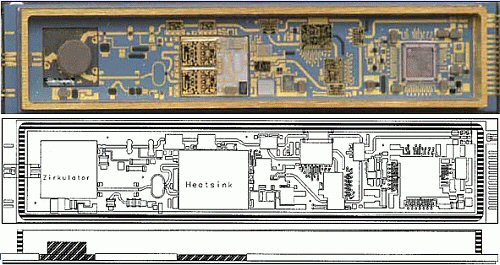
TR-Module

In 1993 a European research project was launched to create the Airborne Multirole Solid State Active Array Radar (AMSAR); it was run by the British-French-German GTDAR ("GEC-Thomson-DASA Airborne Radar") consortium (now Selex ES, Thales and Airbus respectively). This evolved into the CAESAR (Captor Active Electronically Scanned Array Radar), now known as Captor-E AESA.

In May 2007, Eurofighter Development Aircraft 5 made the first flight with the a prototype of the Captor-E. The Captor-E is based on the Captor radar currently in service on Eurofighter production aircraft. The new generation of radar is intended to replace the mechanically steered antennas and high-power transmitters used on current Eurofighter aircraft with an electronically steered array. This enables new mission capabilities for combat aircraft such as simultaneous radar functionalities, air surveillance, air-to-ground and weapon control. The new radar improves the effective air-to-air missile range of the aircraft and allows for faster and more accurate detection and tracking of multiple aircraft with lower life cycle costs. In July 2010, it was reported that the Euroradar consortium made a formal offer to provide an AESA solution for the Eurofighter. The consortium plans to retain as much "back-end" equipment as possible while developing the new radar and also stated that the inclusion of an AESA radar was an important in securing orders from foreign nations.

On 19 November 2014, at the Edinburgh office of Selex ES, the European consortium Eurofighter GmbH and the inter-governmental agency NETMA (NATO Eurofighter and Tornado Management Agency) signed a contract worth €1 billion to develop the electronically scanned digital antenna array Captor-E radar for the Typhoon.

Characteristics of the antennas :

- Captor-M : Mechanically scanned antenna. Interface and integration of the radar to the aircraft by BAE Systems.
- Captor-E ECRS Mk.0 : Interface and integration of the radar to the aircraft is done by BAE Systems. The AESA antenna and T/R modules are made with GaAs HEMT HPA. It has a field of regard exceeding 180 degrees and uses a mechanical repostioner featuring two coupled swashplates to change the radars elevation from -30° to +30°.
- Captor-E ECRS Mk.1 : Interface and integration of the radar to the aircraft is done by Airbus Germany. The AESA antenna and the T/R modules are made with GaN HEMT HPA. It has a field of regard exceeding 180 degrees. It is installed on a pivot. In June 2026 Hensoldt and Indra began live testing of the first ECRS Mk1 Step 1 radars, which add electronic-attack and wideband capability beyond the Mk1 Step 0, with delivery to the German and Spanish air forces targeted for 2027.
- Captor-E ECRS Mk.2 : Interface and integration of the radar to the aircraft is done by BAE Systems. The AESA antenna and the T/R modules are made with GaAs and GaN HEMT HPA. This enables efficient multi-tasking of radar tracking use and electronic warfare simultaneously. It has a field of regard exceeding 180 degrees. It is installed on a pivot derived from the one used on the Gripen E with the Selex ES-05 Raven radar. A new radome was needed for the wider bandwidth of this radar.

== Technology ==
The CAPTOR was optimised for air combat with beyond visual range air-to-air missiles (BVRAAM) under strong enemy electronic countermeasures, resulting from the requirements of the Cold War. Since the end of the Cold War, the main focus of the Eurofighter has shifted from fighter to multi-role combat aircraft tasks. The ground attack capabilities of the radar were therefore further developed in this direction. The mechanical control system was selected in the initial phase of the Eurofighter project as the development risks were to be minimised. According to the project managers, the technology of a mechanically swivelled antenna were fully exploited in the CAPTOR.

The radar consists of a mechanically controlled antenna made of carbon fibre-reinforced plastic with a diameter of 0.7 metres (2 ft 4 in). The antenna can be swivelled by ±60° in elevation and +-70° azimuth. Four high-precision samarium-cobalt servomotors with high torque are used to control the antenna in order to achieve high scanning speeds. The motors can only move the planar antenna in elevation and azimuth angles while roll angles are compensated electronically by combined control in order to reduce weight. Due to the very high scanning speed for a mechanically swivelled antenna, the radar can also interleave different radar modes, which would only otherwise be possible with phased array antennas, albeit much faster. For example, air-to-air and air-to-ground modes can be combined in one scan pass. The accuracy is less than one milliradian in alignment and less than 10 metres (33 ft) in distance.

The CAPTOR operates in the X-band from 8 to 12 gigahertz (GHz) (horizontally polarised) and has twice the transmission power of the AN/APG-65. It automatically switches between low, medium and high pulse repetition rates. These range from 1,000 to 200,000 pulses per second, with the main focus on medium pulse repetition rates. Friend or foe detection (IFF) is integrated into the radar unit and is normally fully automatic. The signal processing consists of 61 plug-in cards (shop replaceable items-SRI) and 6 line replaceable units. The modular design allows for easy repairs and upgrades. The built-in self-diagnostic capability indicates the defective SRI, which can be read out on the ground by a laptop without having to switch on the power supply. If the SRI is actually defective, it is replaced. The software was written in Ada in accordance with the MIL STD 2167A standard. The CAPTOR is the first NATO radar with three processing channels. The first channel is used for target search, the second for target tracking and identification and the third for localisation, classification and overcoming jamming as well as sidelobe suppression. The entire system weighs 193 kilograms (425 lb) and the computers are cooled with both liquid and air.

=== Signal processing ===
Due to the sensor fusion used in the Eurofighter Typhoon by means of the Attack and Identification System (AIS), the radar modes are normally selected automatically by the on-board computer; the CAPTOR is operated exclusively according to the VTAS principle (VTAS - Voice, Throttle and Stick). The general mode of operation of the radar is as follows: First, the radar transmits in 'Velocity Search' (VS) mode to detect approaching targets even in ground clutter. If targets are detected, the radar switches to 'range while search' (RWS) mode. The computer creates a track file and continues to work in 'track while scan' (TWS) mode while searching for new targets. The identity of the targets is then determined by NIS or NCTI and the threats are prioritised. Further modes such as Raid Assessment and Threat Assessment are then applied if necessary. Further operating modes and capabilities are not listed in full:

- Synthetic Aperture Radar / Automatic Target Recognition: Older aircraft types also have a synthetic aperture radar (SAR) mode, but the pilot must search for targets himself, provided the resolution of the image is high enough. This function is automated in the CAPTOR-D/E. The high-resolution SAR image is first smoothed with a Gaussian filter to reduce details. Then the gradient and the direction of the gradient to the neighbouring pixel is determined starting from each pixel. If the magnitude of the gradient of a pixel in a certain direction is greater than that of the neighbouring pixel, the pixel is declared an edge, otherwise it is assigned to the background. Weak edges are eliminated by a hysteresis threshold (Canny algorithm). After another algorithm has generated closed structures, the invariant Fourier descriptors of the image are calculated and fed into an artificial neural network for automatic target identification. Here, several subnets run in parallel and the final result between the subnets is determined by voting. The positions of the detected targets are then marked on the SAR image with red diamonds and the target type is displayed in red text above the diamond, e.g. "T-72" or "MLRS" (multiple rocket launcher). The generated radar image is superimposed on a vectorised map with known Global Positioning System (GPS) coordinates stored in the computer in order to calculate the GPS data of the targets. Alternatively, the GPS target position can be determined using the user's own GPS position and different recording angles and distances. To train the neural network, EADS developed software in which computer-aided design (CAD) models of targets are placed on a map and the scene is converted into a SAR image. The algorithm then attempts to detect the targets despite interfering objects, different target angles and partial occlusion of the targets.
- Non Cooperative Target Identification: Radars have generally been capable of jet engine modulation (JEM) since the end of the 1980s, but this only works in the front of the aircraft as the fan or compressor must be visible. The implementation of 'High Range Resolution' (HRR) was planned for the next generation of fighter aircraft radars. As the name High Range Resolution suggests, the target is profiled along its length. For this purpose, a series of narrowband nanosecond pulses are emitted to achieve a high range resolution in the metre range. In addition to this standard method, it is also possible to transmit narrowband chirps with stepped carrier frequencies as a continuum. The former was already possible before 1987, the latter was newly developed by BAE Systems. The method used by CAPTOR is a secret, but it is probably the latter. The radar echo of the target then emits a characteristic frequency curve over time, as a pulse is first reflected by the nose, cockpit canopy, air intake, leading edges of the wings and vertical stabiliser (if the target is irradiated from the front). In general, a bandwidth of 400 MHz and a large number of measurements are considered necessary to identify airborne targets. Together with the track data of the target, which is required to determine the angle of the target to the radar, the characteristic frequency curve of the echo over time can be assigned to a target type by means of a database comparison. The pilot is then shown an abbreviation for the aircraft type on the display, e.g. "Mrg3" or "Flkr". To prevent the size of the database from getting out of hand, only the aircraft type data that is expected to occur in the respective area is loaded for each mission. Since the outboard load configuration of the target is not known, there may be difficulties with non-cooperative target identification. In this case, hundreds of HRR profiles of the target are created in order to filter out the echoes of the external loads and calculate an ISAR image from them. However, this requires the target to move relative to the radar and the radar to remain on the target for a long time, which is tactically unfavourable. The ISAR image can presumably be shown to the pilot in "Visual Identification" mode on the displays, the resolution per pixel dot is lower than with PIRATE.
- Space-Time Adaptive Processing / Combat Search: This capability is at the heart of the CAPTOR-E. With Space-Time Adaptive Processing (STAP), slow-flying targets can also be recognised under the influence of clutter and interference radiation, even if their echo signal would otherwise be drowned out by interference signals. Several sub-apertures are used for this purpose, with which the wave field reflected from the ground is scanned with a time delay. Ideally, the signals in the individual channels only differ by this time offset. However, moving targets with a radial velocity component change their distance to the sensor within this period of time, so that the signals are subject to a phase shift and can be distinguished from the clutter signals. In the environment of the echo signal of a target, not only the temporal change is considered, but also compared with the spatial change (space-time). The principle is also used to detect slow ground targets in Ground Moving Target Indication (GMTI) mode. If an aerial target is lost in TWS mode, the suspected target area no longer has to be swivelled in a time-consuming manner with a signal lobe: The Combat Search mode generates multiple signal lobes that cover the target area in a chessboard-like manner within an angle range of 20° × 20°. Idealised, one pulse, sent and received by several signal lobes, is sufficient to find the lost target again.
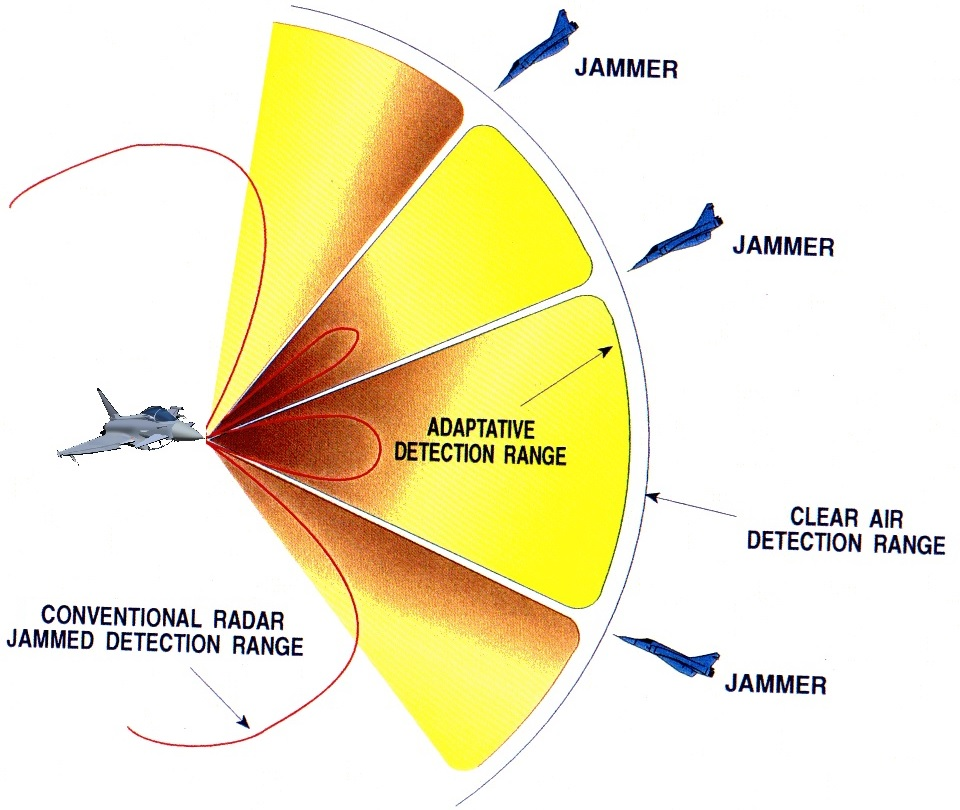
- Adaptive Beam Forming
  Jammer Mapping / Deterministic Nulling: The CAPTOR-E (according to rumours also the CAPTOR-M) is capable of jammer mapping. This uses spectral processing to determine the identity and angle of the jammer with a high degree of accuracy. The CAPTOR-E then starts with digital adaptive beamforming: as the directivity of an AESA antenna can be manipulated as required by controlling the transmit/receive (T/R) modules, zeros are set in the antenna pattern in the direction of the jammers. The key is to make the null points as narrow as possible so that targets next to interferers can be reliably recognised. During AMSAR flights, the signal strength of interference sources could be reduced to background noise so that targets reappeared. Deterministic nulling is used to improve the result. Here, the received signals of the T/R modules are weighted differently by the signal processor across all degrees of freedom of the antenna in order to further reduce the influence of interference.
- Low Probability of Intercept: In order to reduce the probability of detection by enemy radar detectors and electronic support measures, the CAPTOR-E will be equipped with an low-probability-of-intercept (LPI) radar operating mode. Few details are known about this; the radar will transmit with a wide main lobe and receive through multiple lobes with high antenna gain.
- Noise Jamming / High-Power Microwave: When used as a jammer, the radar transmits at full power in all frequencies simultaneously, focussing the radar energy on the enemy's X-band antenna. This increases the background noise at the target radar, the signal-to-noise ratio deteriorates and the range decreases. If the available effective radiated power (ERP) of their own antenna is high enough, additional signal lobes can be formed for airspace search, target tracking or interference. If the burn-through distance is undershot, the broadband noise becomes pointless. If the enemy is close enough to the CAPTOR-E, High-Power Microwave (HPM) mode comes into effect: the radar energy is focussed extremely strongly on the target and the transmission frequency, pulse repetition rate and signal pattern are adapted to the target. The energy penetrates the object via a front-door, usually the weapon's seeker (IR or radar), or via feedback effects from the surface and openings (back-door). This creates an electromagnetic field inside, which - if suitable transmission parameters are selected - interferes with the weapon's electronics. This leads to an increase in the bit error rate and, in the best case, to computer crashes. Possible applications include the deflection of enemy missiles and suppression of enemy air defences (SEAD). While the jammer function should be available as soon as possible with the introduction of the CAPTOR-E, its use as an energy weapon is not planned until later.
- High-Speed Datalink / Cyberattack: AESA antennas can also be used as directional radio antennas to transmit data at high data transmission rates. For example, the AN/APG-77 can transmit at 548 megabits per second and receive in the gigabit range. As the CAPTOR-E uses the same carrier frequency, similar speeds will be possible. The data transmission function should be available shortly after the CAPTOR-E is launched. Its use as a cyber weapon for injecting malware is only planned for later. The Suter, which was developed by BAE Systems to attack enemy computer networks and communication systems, means that the EuroRADAR consortium already has expertise and experience.
- Bistatic Radar / Space-Based Radar: The ability to exchange data packets between radars makes it possible to use two CAPTOR-Es as bistatic radars. Thanks to the inclined, rotatable antenna surface, the machines can fly on a parallel course while working together. One exotic possible application would be to use a satellite with an X-band AESA in orbit as a transmitter and utilise the CAPTOR-E as a passive radar. The principle was already demonstrated in November 2007 with the TerraSAR-X satellite. The successor system to SAR-Lupe, called SARah, is also to receive a satellite with AESA, which is based on TerraSAR-X and TanDEM-X. For example, the Defence Evaluation and Research Agency's (DERA) AESA radar prototype 'Phased Array Concepts Evaluation Rig' (PACER), which was intended to support the development of the AMSAR, consisted only of passive X-band receiver modules and was intended to research bistatic applications, among other things.

== Operators ==
=== Current operators ===
==== Captor-M ====
571 aircraft fitted with this radar.

Austria

- Austrian Air Force – 15 radars and 3 ordered (Tranche 1)

Germany

- German Air Force – 143 radars (Tranche 1 - Tranche 3)

Italy

- Italian Air Force – 96 radars (Tranche 1 - Tranche 3)

Oman

- Royal Air Force of Oman – 12 radars (Tranche 3)

Saudi Arabia

- Royal Saudi Air Force – 72 radars (Tranche 2 - Tranche 3)

Spain

- Spanish Air and Space Force – 73 radars (Tranche 1 - Tranche 3)

United Kingdom

- Royal Air Force – 160 radars (Tranche 1 - Tranche 3)

==== Captor-E ECRS Mk0 ====
52 aircraft will eventually be fitted with this radar.

Kuwait

- Kuwait Air Force – 6 radars in service, 22 more on order as of September 2022 (Tranche 3)

Qatar

- Qatar Emiri Air Force – 10 radars in service, 14 more on order as of March 2023 (Tranche 3)

=== Future operators ===
==== Captor-E ECRS Mk0 ====
24 aircraft will eventually be fitted with this radar.

Turkey

- Turkish Air Force – 24 radars to equip the 24 Tranche 4+ aircraft rdered in October 2025.

==== Captor-E ECRS Mk1 ====
Over 150 aircraft should eventually be fitted with this radar, some retrofitted.

Germany

- German Air Force – 38 radars to equip the Tranche 4 "Quadriga" Initial deliveries will be of the Mk 0 radar
- German Air Force – 110 radars on order for the modernisation of the Tranche 2 and 3
- German Air Force – 20 radars to equip the Tranche 5.

Spain

- Spanish Air and Space Force – 20 radars to equip the Tranche 4 "Halcon" Initial deliveries will be of the Mk 0 radar
- Spanish Air and Space Force – 5 radars on order for the modernisation of the Tranche 3
- Spanish Air and Space Force – 25 additional to equip the Tranche 4 "Halcon II".

==== Captor-E ECRS Mk2 ====
At least 64 aircraft will eventually be fitted with this radar, up to 160 aircraft (depending on Germany and the UK's decisions).

Italy

- Italian Air Force – 24 radars for the Tranche 4

United Kingdom – Royal Air Force

- 40 radars on order for the modernisation of the Tranche 3.

=== Potential operators ===
United Kingdom – Royal Air Force

- Potential order for Tranche 2 (up to 67 aircraft)
