= 792 Naval Air Squadron =

Inactive flying squadron of the Royal Navy's Fleet Air Arm

- Squadron badge (top from 1949, bottom to 1945)
- Active: 1940–1945; 1948–1950; 2001–2009
- Disbanded: 4 June 2009
- Country: United Kingdom
- Branch: Royal Navy
- Type: Fleet Air Arm Second Line Squadron
- Role: Air Target Towing Unit; Night Fighter Training School; Fleet Target Unit
- Size: Squadron
- Part of: Fleet Air Arm
- Home station: RNAS St Merryn; RNAS Culdrose
- Mottos: Patimur ut discant alii (Latin for 'We suffer that others may learn'); Sapientia vincit tenebras (Latin for 'Wisdom conquers darkness')
- Aircraft: See Aircraft flown section for full list.

Insignia
- Squadron Badge Description: White, a lion rampant armed and langued red holding in his fore paws a target in military colours (Wartime unofficial, transferred to 794 NAS on disbandment January 1945); Gold, a panther's head caboshed black (1949)
- Identification Markings: S8A+ (all types by 1944); 220-227 (Firefly); 491-494 (Sea Hornet); 640-642 (Anson/Oxford 1948-50)
- Fin Shore Code: CW (Firefly, Sea Hornet, Anson & Oxford)

792 Naval Air Squadron (792 NAS), also known as 792 Squadron, is an inactive Fleet Air Arm (FAA) naval air squadron of the United Kingdom’s Royal Navy (RN). I was most recently active from 2001 to 2009 operating the Mirach 100/5 unmanned subsonic drones which were used to test the Sea Dart Missile System on Type 42 destroyers and Sidewinder missiles on Harrier and Tornado fighters, having reformed at RNAS Culdrose (HMS Seahawk), Cornwall, in November 2001 from the Fleet Target Group, from RNAS Portland (HMS Osprey), which closed in 1998.

It was originally formed at RNAS St Merryn (HMS Vulture) in August 1940 as an Air Target Unit, equipped with six Blackburn Skuas. The squadron disbanded in 1945 and merged with 794 Naval Air Squadron. 792 Squadron reformed at RNAS Culdrose in 1948 as a Night Fighter Training Unit. It was initially equipped with Fairey Firefly NF.1s and Avro Ansons. They were later replaced with de Havilland Sea Hornets shortly before the squadron disbanded again in August 1950.

It is not listed on the current Royal Navy website and is believed to have been replaced by QinetiQ's Combined Aerial Target Service contract.

== History ==
=== Air Target Towing Unit (1940-1945) ===
792 Naval Air Squadron formed as an Air Target Towing Unit, at RNAS St Merryn (HMS Vulture), in Cornwall, on 15 August 1940. Equipped initially with six Blackburn Roc and Blackburn Skua aircraft. The Blackburn Roc was a carrier-based turret fighter aircraft adapted as a target tug and the Blackburn Skua was a carrier-based dive bomber / fighter, similarly adapted for target towing work. These aircraft were eventually withdrawn and replaced with a dedicated target tug variant of the Boulton Paul Defiant, and Miles Martinet, an aircraft designed specifically for target towing. 792 Naval Air Squadron disbanded on 2 January 1945 on being absorbed into 794 Naval Air Squadron.

=== Night Fighter Training School (1948-1950) ===
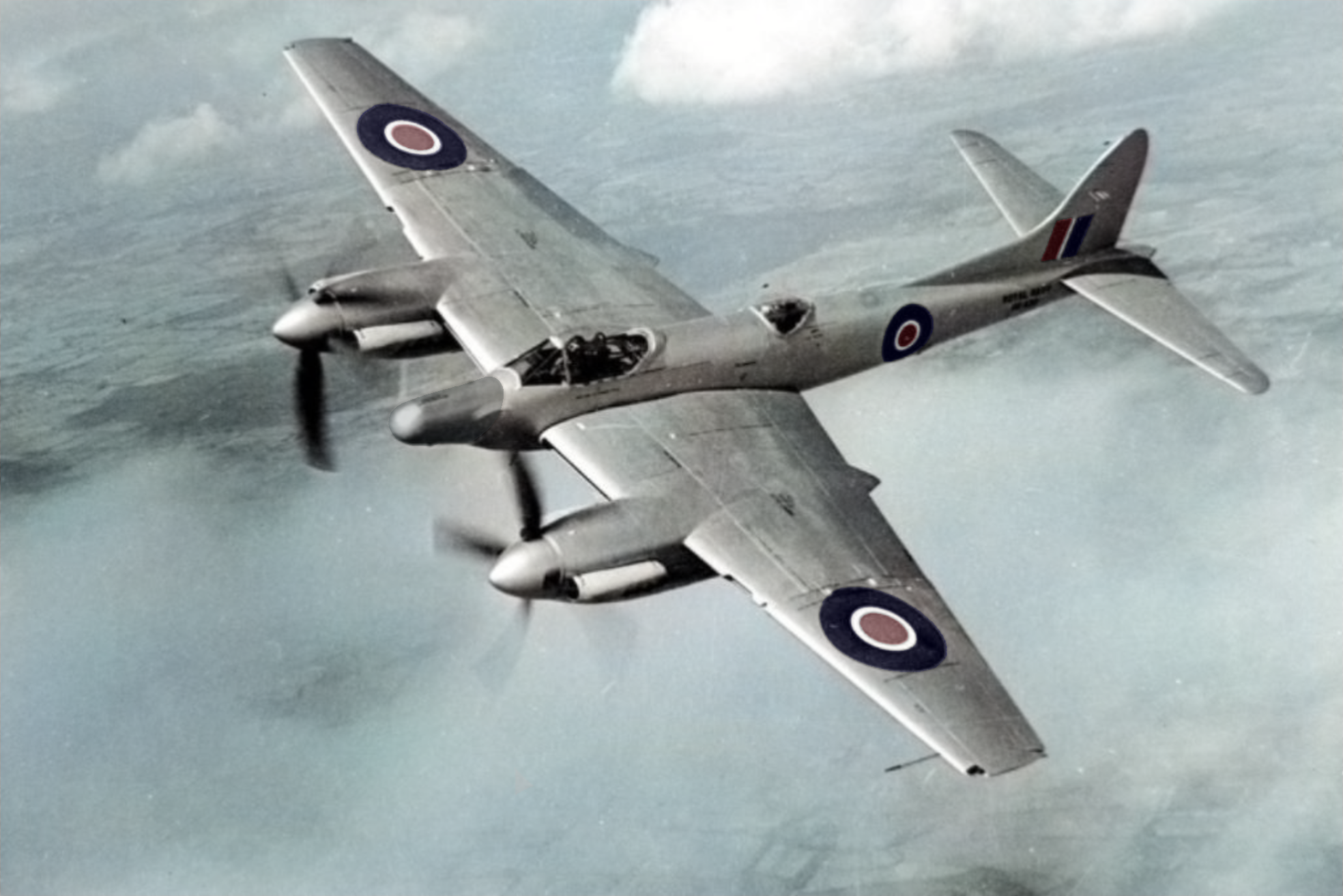
de Havilland Sea Hornet NF.21; an example of the type used by 792 NAS

792 Naval Air Squadron reformed at RNAS Culdrose (HMS Seahawk) on 15 January 1948, as the Night Fighter Training School. It was initially equipped with Fairey Firefly NF.Mk l, a "night fighter" variant of the carrier-borne fighter and anti-submarine aircraft and the unit also had three Avro Anson, a British twin-engine, multi-role aircraft. These were fitted for aircraft interception (AI) radar training. In May 1950 the squadron received de Havilland Sea Hornet NF.21 the “night fighter” variant of the twin-engined fighter aircraft. 792 Naval Air Squadron disbanded on 16 August 1950, with 809 Naval Air Squadron acquiring its aircraft and role.

=== Fleet Target Unit (2001-2009) ===
792 Naval Air Squadron reformed at RNAS Culdrose (HMS Seahawk), Cornwall, on 1 November 2001 from the Fleet Target Group, (it originally formed in 1959 as the RN Pilotless Target Aircraft Squadron, and became the Fleet Target Group in January 1974), which relocated from RNAS Portland (HMS Osprey), Dorset, upon the airbases closure in 1998.

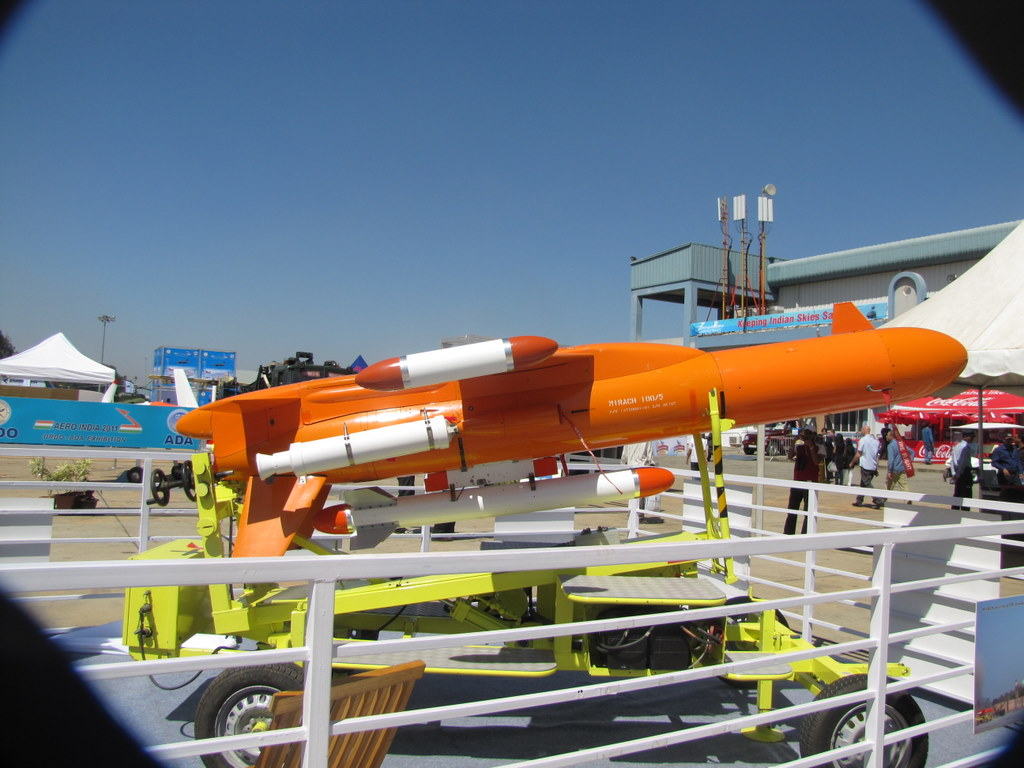
A Mirach 100/5 Aerial Target; an example of the type used by 792 NAS

The squadron, known as the Fleet Target Unit was equipped with unmanned radio-controlled target aircraft, used for missile training, including the Mirach 100/5 Aerial Target Drone, which has similar characteristics to an Unmanned Aerial Vehicle (UAV). The unit was tasked to provide target opportunities for ships' missile systems and for fighter aircraft during weapon systems testing and training. The Sea Dart surface-to-air missile system fitted to Type 42, or Sheffield class of Guided-missile destroyer was tested. As was the AIM-9 Sidewinder short-range air-to-air missile, used by the Royal Navy's British Aerospace Sea Harrier strike fighter and the Royal Air Forces Panavia Tornado multi role aircraft was also tested.

792 Naval Air Squadron operated its target drone aircraft on temporary detachments from shore bases, Royal Navy warships and Royal Fleet Auxiliary ships in support of gun and missile trials and training, however, the squadrons role was replaced by a commercial contract in June 2009. 792 NAS disbanded in June 2009, with the responsibility of target provision passing to QinetiQ.

== Aircraft flown ==
The squadron has flown a number of different aircraft types, including:

- Blackburn Roc TT target tug (August 1940 - May 1942)
- Blackburn Skua TT target tug (August 1940 - May 1943)
- Gloster Sea Gladiator fighter aircraft (May 1941 - June 1942)
- Percival Proctor lA radio trainer aircraft (December 1941 - July 1942)
- Westland Lysander Mk.III army co-operation and liaison aircraft (March - May 1942)
- Fairey Fulmar Mk.II reconnaissance/fighter aircraft (April 1942 - July 1944)
- Miles Whitney Straight twin-seat cabin monoplane (July 1942)
- Miles Martinet TT.Mk I target tug (July 1943 - January 1945)
- Boulton Paul Defiant TT Mk III target tug (December 1943 - January 1945)
- Hawker Sea Hurricane Mk.IA fighter aircraft (May 1944)
- Avro Anson I multi-role trainer aircraft (January 1948 - August 1950)
- Fairey Firefly NF.Mk 1 night fighter (January 1948 - July 1950)
- de Havilland Sea Hornet NF.21 night fighter (May - August 1950)
- Mirach 100/5 Unmanned aerial vehicle (November 2001 - May 2009)

== Naval air stations ==
792 Naval Air Squadron operated from a couple of naval air stations of the Royal Navy, in England:

1940 - 1945

- Royal Naval Air Station St Merryn (HMS Vulture), Cornwall, (15 August 1940 - 2 January 1945)
- disbanded - 2 January 1945

1948 - 1950

- Royal Naval Air Station Culdrose (HMS Seahawk), Cornwall, (15 January 1948 - 16 August 1950)
- disbanded 16 August 1950

2001 - 2009

- Royal Naval Air Station Culdrose (HMS Seahawk), Cornwall, (1 November 2001 - 4 June 2009)
- disbanded - 4 June 2009

== Commanding officers ==
List of commanding officers of 792 Naval Air Squadron with date of appointment:

1940 - 1945

- Lieutenant H.E.R. Torin, DSC, RN, from 15 August 1940
- Lieutenant(A) H.R. Dimock, RNVR, from 9 December 1940
- Lieutenant E.W. Lawson, RN, from 5 May 1941
- Lieutenant Commander(A) T.J. Archer, RNVR, from 30 September 1941
- Lieutenant Commander(A) G.V. Oddy, RNVR, from 8 December 1941
- Lieutenant M.W. Wotherspoon, RNVR, from 9 November 1943
- Lieutenant Commander(A) N.G. Maclean, RNVR, from 12 June 1944
- disbanded - 2 January 1945

1948 - 1950

- Lieutenant(A) B.C. Lyons, RN, from 15 January 1948
- Lieutenant J.A. McColgan, RN, from 28 November 1949
- disbanded - 16 August 1950

2001 - 2009

- Lieutenant Commander A. Rogers, RN, from 1 November 2001
- disbanded - 4 June 2009

Note: Abbreviation (A) signifies Air Branch of the RN or RNVR.
