= Mirach 26 =

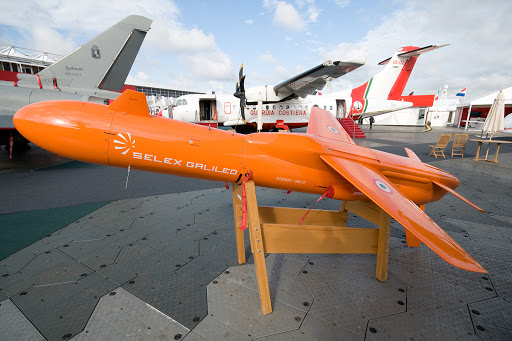

General information
- Type: Reconnaissance UAV
- National origin: Italy
- Manufacturer: Galileo Avionica
- Designer: Meteor CAE, Galileo Avionica

History
- First flight: 1992

The Mirach 26 is a reconnaissance UAV developed in Italy during the 1990s, based on the Mirach 20 target drone. The initial work on the design was carried out by Meteor CAE before this company was absorbed by Galileo Avionica, then Selex ES (merged into Leonardo-Finmeccanica since 2016).

The Mirach 26 is of typical twin-boom pusher-prop battlefield surveillance UAV configuration. It is very similar to the older Mirach 20 in appearance but slightly bigger, the most visible difference being that the Mirach 26 has antenna disks on the top of the tailfins. It is powered by a 20 kW (26 hp) Sachs piston engine.

== Specifications ==
Data from Unmanned Aircraft Directory

General characteristics

- Crew: None
- Capacity: 50 kg (110 lb) payload
- Length: 4.00 m (13 ft 1 in)
- Wingspan: 4.73 m (15 ft 6 in)
- Height: 1.27 m (4 ft 2 in)
- Wing area: 3.0 m^{2} (32 sq ft)
- Max takeoff weight: 408 kg (899 lb)
- Powerplant: 1 × Herbrandson Dyad 2-cylinder, 2-stroke piston engine, 19 kW (26 hp)

Performance

- Maximum speed: 180 km/h (110 mph, 97 kn)
- Range: 600 km (370 mi, 320 nmi)
- Endurance: 4 hr
- Service ceiling: 3,500 m (11,500 ft)
