= EuroFIRST PIRATE =

Military fighter targeting system

The EuroFirst Passive Infrared Airborne Track Equipment (PIRATE) is the forward looking infrared (FLIR)/infra-red search and track (IRST) for the Eurofighter Typhoon. It is produced by the EuroFIRST consortium consisting of Leonardo S.p.A. of Italy (lead contractor and design and technical authority), Thales Land & Joint Systems of the UK, and Tecnobit of Spain. The system is mounted on the port side of the fuselage, forward of the windscreen and provides passive and thus undetectable and unjammable means of long range surveillance. In addition the system has been shown to locate stealth aircraft at a "significant distance" with further improvements in detection through software updates. PIRATE detects infrared radiation generated from the heat of an aircraft's skin, either through air friction or hot parts such as engines.

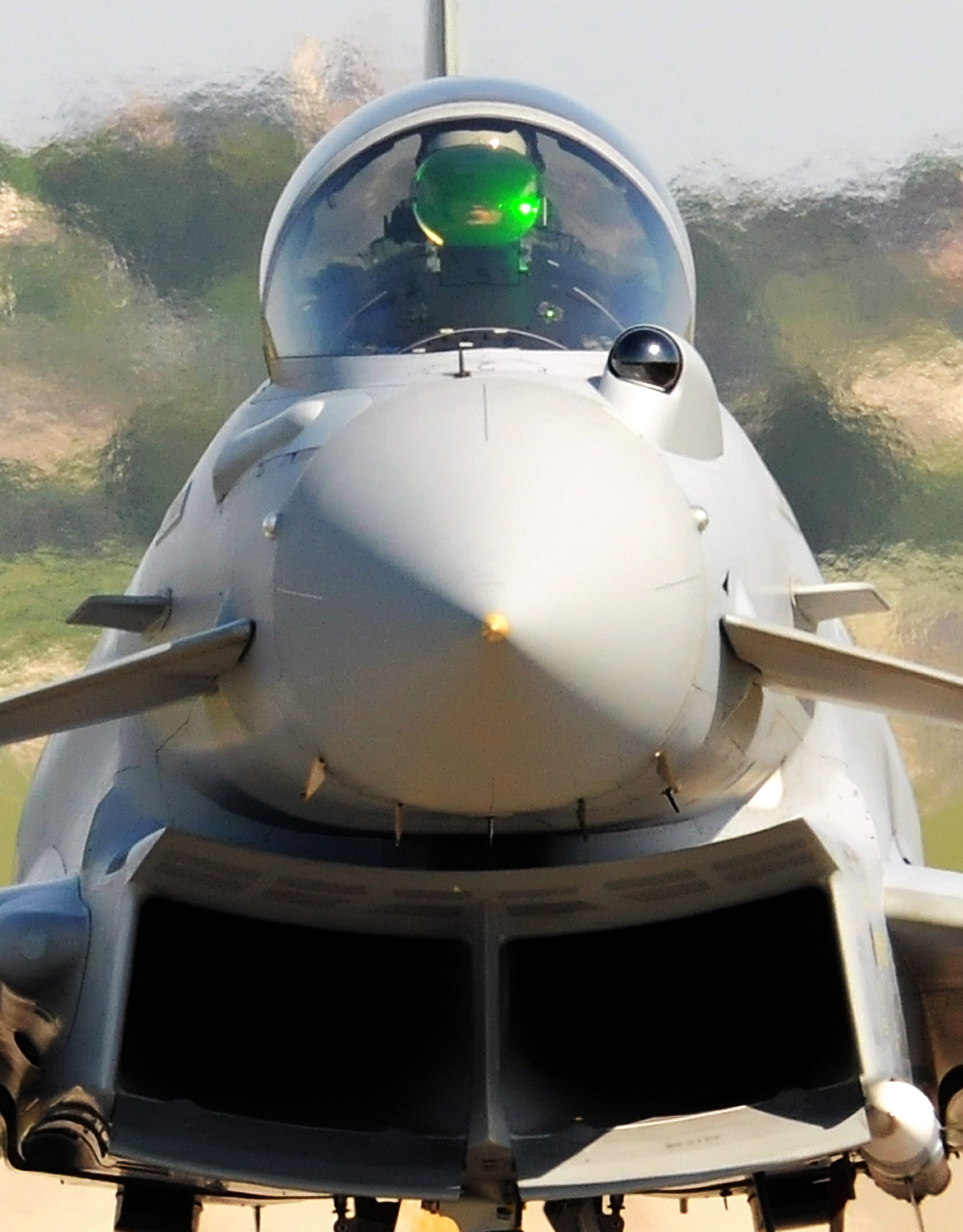
Eurofighter Typhoon with PIRATE IRST

== Development ==
In 1989 Thorn-EMI and FIAR, and GEC Avionics and Pilkington and Ferranti competed for the tender to develop an IRST system for the Eurofighter. In 1991, Germany decided not to participate in the development due to cost issues but reserved the right to use the system. In September 1992, Thorn-EMI (now Thales) finally won the tender with Italy's FIAR (now Leonardo) and Spain's Eurotronica for the infrared sensor of the Eurofighters, based on the Air Defence Alerting Device (ADAD), and went on to form the EuroFirst consortium. The flight tests were begun in 2001 by testing the FLIR function in the case of flights between Turin and Sardinia. Later on, the FLIR was also used to coordinate the integration into the Eurofighter's display elements. The first Eurofighter Typhoon equipped with PIRATE was in a tranche 1 block 5 and delivered to the Italian Aeronautica Militare in August 2007.

== Technology ==
=== Sensor ===
PIRATE is a passive, rotating, cooled infrared sensor with high resolution, which is also referred to as an imaging infrared sensor. PIRATE operates in two IR bands, 3–5 and 8–11 micrometres. The externally visible dome is only the azimuthally rotatable sensor head, which contains the tilting mirror. Both elements have been stabilized, the maximum azimuth and elevation range is probably 150 ° × 60 °. The sensor consists of a single Line-Replaceable Item (LRI), which in turn contains four subsystems: The sensor head module with the stabilized sensor head, the detector, the servo control processor, and the electronics for signal matching. The data processing computer to discover and tracking targets, the video processor to the imaging display of the infrared image on the HUD, HMD or MHDD. The sensor is connected to the MIL-STD-1553 to and connect to a STANEG 2910 bus. PowerPC processors were used for the signal processing. The sensor is 680 × 591 × 300 mm (L x W x H), and weighs 48 kilograms.

=== Operating Modes ===
PIRATE is fundamentally a Track-While-Scan infrared search and track (IRST) system which also performs conventional navigation FLIR functions. It can track and prioritized up to 500 targets simultaneously. In the air-air role, the equipment passively detects, tracks, classifies and prioritizes multiple airborne targets under all aspects, look-up, look-down and co-altitude conditions. The IRST functions are fully integrated into the aircraft attack and identification sub-system and can be diverted to specific search and track areas as a result of commands on the communication bus. The pilot has several selectable operating modes depending upon the particular combat mission requirement. These images are displayed on the Head Up Display (HUD), Multifunction Head Down Display (MHDD) or the pilots helmet visor.

PIRATE is capable of operating in each one of the following IRST modes:

- Multiple target tracking: Where engagement (detection, tracking and prioritisation) of multiple targets in A/A, look up/down operations over the whole field of regard or in a selectable volume are executable. Passive ranging data is also available.
- Single target tracking: Where angle tracking of a single acquired target can be commanded. Automatic re-acquisition capability is available.
- Slaved acquisition: Where line-of-sight is slaved to externally defined pointing angles and automatic acquisition of a single target is activated.

PIRATE is also providing IR TV imaging to cockpit displays in accordance with the following FLIR modes:

- Flying / Landing Aid
- Steerable IR Picture on Helmet (SIRPH): The IRST sensor is coupled to the movement of the head of the pilot. The sensor then looks to where the pilot is looking, the FLIR picture is on the heads-up display projected.
- Identification

=== Range ===
The range of the sensor is a closely guarded secret by the EuroFirst consortium but confirmed to be more than 74 km. The RAND Corporation reports ranges of 50 nm (93 km) to a subsonic target from the front and up to 90 nm (167 km) from the rear of a subsonic target. However, the weather conditions will affect the performance of the infrared-based target search and target tracking significantly. In 2013, the detection range of PIRATE was said to be further increased by software updates.
