= BAE Systems Avionics =

BAE Systems Avionics Ltd.
- Founded: 1969 (as division of GEC)
- Defunct: 3 May 2005
- Fate: Merged with Galileo Avionica
- Successor: SELEX Sensors and Airborne Systems
- Headquarters: Basildon, England

BAE Systems Avionics was the avionics unit of BAE Systems until 2005, at which time it was transferred to SELEX Sensors and Airborne Systems S.p.A. (initially 75% Finmeccanica and 25% BAE Systems, but since March 2007 fully owned by Finmeccanica). Selex S&AS became SELEX Galileo in 2008 and from January 2013 (following a merger with other Finmeccanica companies SELEX Sistemi Integrati and Selex Elsag) traded as Selex ES. It then merged into Leonardo S.p.A.'s land and naval defence electronics division on 1 January 2016.

The business had its UK headquarters in Basildon, Essex, England.

== History ==
BAE Systems Avionics has a rich heritage which dates back to 1909 when the Elliott and Marconi companies began to fit aircraft with systems (beginning with embryonic air to ground communications). By 1913 Elliot's avionics product lines advanced to gyroscopes, weapon sights and altimeters.

=== Timeline ===
- 1804 - William Elliott establishes a company manufacturing scientific and surveying instruments.
- 1853 - Company renamed Elliott Brothers.
- 1897 - Guglielmo Marconi founds his company.
- 1909 - Elliott Brothers and Marconi companies both begin to fit avionics to early aircraft.
- 1946 - Marconi is acquired by English Electric.
- 1967 - English Electric and Elliott Automation merge.
- 1968 - The new English Electric group is acquired by GEC.
- 1969 - GEC renames avionics business Marconi-Elliott Avionics Systems Limited, part of the company's defence arm, GEC-Marconi.
- 1978 - Renamed Marconi Avionics Limited.
- 1984 - Renamed GEC Avionics Limited.
- 1990 - Take-over of Ferranti creating GEC Ferranti
- 1998 - Renamed Marconi Avionics, part of the renamed defence arm, Marconi Electronic Systems (MES).
- 1999 - MES merged with British Aerospace to form BAE Systems. Avionics business becomes BAE Systems Avionics.
- 2005 - Parts of BAE Systems Avionics merged with Galileo Avionica to form SELEX Sensors and Airborne Systems.
- 2008 - SELEX Sensors and Airborne Systems is re-branded SELEX Galileo.
- 2013 - SELEX Galileo merged with SELEX Sistemi Integrati and Selex Elsag to form Selex ES.
- 2016 - Selex ES activities became part of Leonardo’s land and naval defence electronics division

== Sources ==
- The Changing World of Avionics, G.M. Barling. GEC Review, Vol. 6 1990
- Elliott early history
