= FIAR =

Defunct Italian avionics company

- Industry: Avionics
- Founded: 1941
- Defunct: 2003
- Successor: Leonardo S.p.A.
- Headquarters: Milan

FIAR S.p.A. (Fabbrica Italiana Apparecchiature Radioelettriche) was an Italian avionics and radar manufacturer; the Eurofighter's current radar contains its technology.

== History ==
It was formed on 31 July 1941, as a spin off from Compagnia Generale di Elettricità (CGE), and also known as CGE-FIAR. It made repeater transmitters for RAI (Radiotelevisione italiana), the national broadcasting company of Italy.

In the 1980s it formed the ELIRADAR consortium with SMA (Stato maggiore dell'Aeronautica Militare). It was a prime contractor for some avionics in the Panavia Tornado; Italy took a 15% share in the Panavia Aircraft project and planned to buy 100 of the aircraft.

Up until the late 1980s, it had only produced radars built under licence. The first radar that it developed itself was the Grifo. The company was Italy's leading manufacturer of radar and infrared homing technology, notably for the MIM-23 Hawk missile. It made airborne and precision approach radar.

=== Ownership ===
It was a division of Alenia Aeronautica (Alenia Difesa from 1994 to 2001), later bought by Finmeccanica.

== Products ==
=== Radar systems ===
- CRESO ground surveillance radar
- ECR-90 (Euroradar CAPTOR), for the Eurofighter, contains the Grifo technology
- ELIRADAR APS-784, equips the AgustaWestland AW101
- EuroFIRST PIRATE (Passive Infrared Airborne Tracking Equipment, infrared homing for the Eurofighter)
- Grifetto
- Grifo (X band)
- Pointer
- Setter, look down radar (named after the dog)

== Structure ==
It was headquartered in Lombardy in north-west Italy, with a factory in Baranzate near Bollate on the SP 233.

== See also ==
- Microtecnica, former Italian avionics company
