= Alenia Marconi Systems =

European defence electronics corporation

- Founded: 23 December 1998
- Defunct: 3 May 2005
- Fate: Demerged
- Successor: BAE Systems Insyte; SELEX Sistemi Integrati

Alenia Marconi Systems (AMS) was a major European integrated defence electronics company and an equal shares joint venture between BAE Systems and Finmeccanica (now Leonardo S.p.A.) until its dissolution on 3 May 2005.

AMS was formed in 1998 by the merger of GEC-Marconi Radar and Defence Systems and Alenia Difesa. Equal shares in the resulting company were then held by Finmeccanica, and GEC-Marconi (later Marconi Electronic Systems (MES)), a division of The General Electric Company (GEC).

With the demerger and subsequent sale of its MES division in 1999, GEC's interest in AMS passed to BAE Systems.

In 2001 AMS' missile systems division was merged with Aerospatiale Matra Missiles and Matra BAe Dynamics to form MBDA.

On 7 October 2003 the UK holding company for AMS changed its registered name from Alenia Marconi Systems Limited to AMS Limited to comply with the agreements reached regarding use of the name "Marconi" following the sale of Marconi Electronic Systems by GEC (later Marconi plc). This name change was reflected in rebranding across the company, although the Italian holding company retained the name Alenia Marconi Systems SpA.

On 28 January 2005 BAE Systems and Finmeccanica announced the intention to dissolve their partnership in the AMS joint venture with AMS' UK and Italian operations taken over by the respective partners as arranged through the Eurosystems Transaction. On 3 May 2005 the Eurosystems Transaction was finalised:

- The UK operations of AMS (minus air traffic control and communication systems) brought together with the C4ISR division of BAE Systems (minus communication systems) to form the new BAE Systems Integrated System Technologies (Insyte) division of BAE Systems.
- The Italian operations of AMS (Alenia Marconi Systems SpA) became SELEX Sistemi Integrati which in turn became Selex ES in January 2013.

== Products ==
- Air traffic control
- Air defence systems
- Airport infrastructure
  - Lighting
  - Meteorological systems
- Command and control (C²)
- Communication systems
- Data links
- Simulators etc.
  - Aerospace
  - Military
- Radar - Civil and military
  - Ground
  - Naval

== See also ==
- Alenia Aeronautica
- Alenia Difesa
- Alenia Spazio
