= BAE Systems Integrated System Technologies =

Coordinates: 51°18′53.36″N 0°45′0.68″W

- Type: Division
- Founded: May 3, 2005; 21 years ago
- Defunct: 2010
- Fate: Merged into BAE's air and naval businesses
- Headquarters: Frimley, Surrey, United Kingdom
- Parent: BAE Systems

BAE Systems Integrated System Technologies (known informally as Insyte) was a division of BAE Systems plc. The division was a major supplier of defence electronics, integrated command and control systems, radars, simulators, meteorological systems, data links and C4ISR battle management systems

Insyte was formed on 3 May 2005, by bringing together BAE Systems' interests in C4ISR and the UK operations of AMS following the Eurosystems Transaction.

Its headquarters were in Frimley, Surrey, but the major activities of the division are carried out across 13 sites throughout England and Scotland.

In 2010 BAE Systems merged Integrated System Technologies into its air and naval businesses.
