= SignalTrace =

SignalTrace is a technology developed by Italian aerospace, defense and security company Leonardo.

== History ==
In 2024, a patent was granted to Leonardo for technology that allowed for detecting of electronic signatures from devices of targeted individuals. It is meant to upgrade and be used with the company's Elsag Automatic License Plate Readers.

SignalTrace was previously marketed as Elsag Eoc Plug. The product has been used in over 25 countries as to date

== Mechanism ==
The technology can capture device data even without visible license plates. It does so without decrypting the contents of data in the device and instead relies on the publicly broadcast signals of the devices. Device signatures it can detect are bluetooth wearables, fitness trackers, laptops, vehicle components, RFID signals, wifi-hotspots, pet micro-chips and mobile phones as some of the items listed on their product data sheet. This information is then linked with other devices along with the vehicle with time-stamps and location data and stored for law enforcement to search up.
