= Mirach 150 =

Family of unmanned aircraft built by Selex

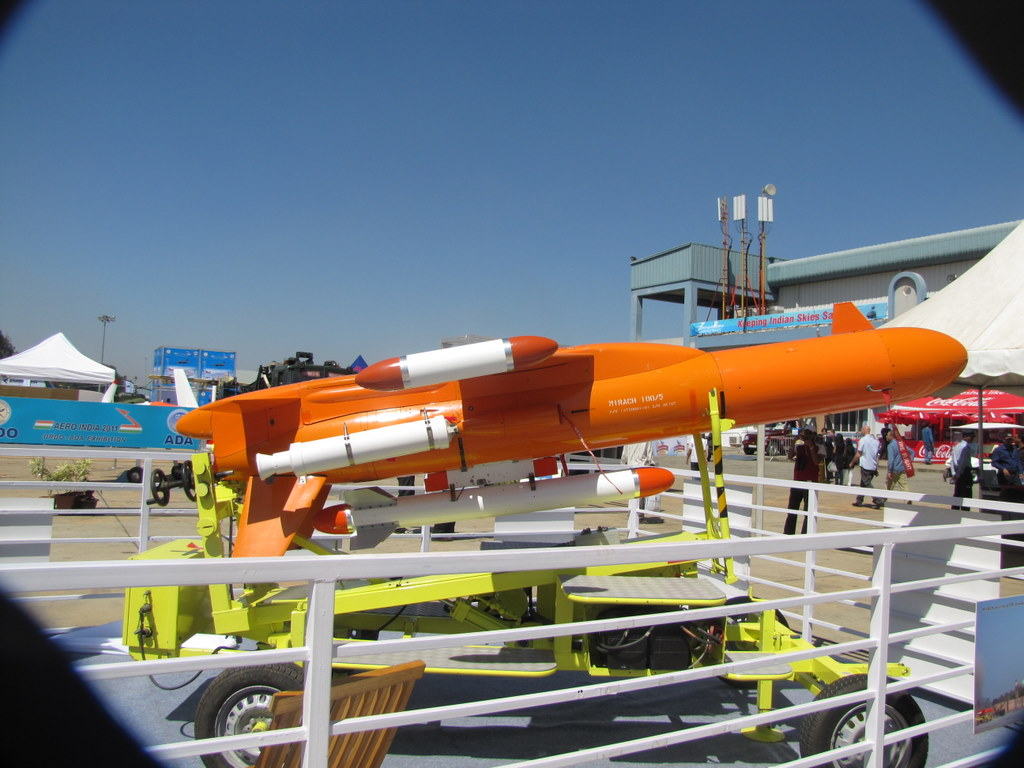

General information
- Type: Unmanned reconnaissance aircraft
- National origin: Italy
- Manufacturer: Selex ES; Finmeccanica (since 2016); Leonardo(since 2017)
- Designer: Meteor CAE, Galileo Avionica

The Mirach 150 is a reconnaissance unmanned aerial vehicle (UAV) developed in Italy in the 1990s. A turbojet-powered machine, it is apparently a derivative of the Mirach 100 series of targets, being of the same general size and also powered by a Microturbo TRS-18-1 turbojet.

Meteor is now promoting a new derivative of the Meteor 150, named the Nibbio, for tactical reconnaissance and other missions. It has an operational radius of 380 kilometers (240 mi) and can carry a 60 kilogram (122 pound) payload, including Electro-optic/infrared (EO/IR) imagers, Signals intelligence (SIGINT) payloads, or Electronic countermeasure (ECM) payloads. It can be ground or air-launched, and is recovered by parachute.

== Specifications (Mirach 150) ==
General characteristics

- Crew: None
- Length: 4.70 m (15 ft 5 in)
- Wingspan: 2.10 m (6 ft 11 in)
- Gross weight: 345 kg (760 lb)
- Powerplant: 1 × Microturbo TRS-18-1 , 1.5 kN (330 lbf) thrust

Performance

- Maximum speed: 855 km/h (530 mph, 460 kn)
- Endurance: 1 hours
- Service ceiling: 9,200 m (30,000 ft)
