= International Flight Training School =

International school for military pilots

The International Flight Training School (IFTS) is an International school for military pilots, based in Decimomannu Air Base, Sardinia, Italy, born from a collaboration project between the Italian Air Force and Leonardo S.p.A. supported by CAE.

== History ==
The International Flight Training School was announced on 18 July 2018 during the Farnborough International Air Show in UK. On this occurrence the CEO of Leonardo S.p.A., Alessandro Profumo, and the then Italian Air Force Chief of Staff, the General Enzo Vecciarelli, signed the collaboration agreement that gave birth to the IFTS.

The training offer provided by the IFTS located at the Lecce-Galatina Air base is addressed to pilots belonging both to the Italian Air Force and to international air forces as well.

The IFTS School offers an Integrated Training System that exploits the Aermacchi M-346 advanced jet trainer and its Ground Based Training System (GBTS), both developed by Leonardo S.p.A. in collaboration with CAE to train military pilots intended for front-line fighters.

The Italian Air Force brings to the IFTS its longstanding expertise, the “Train As You Fight” imprinting to the training programme, selects international instructor pilots and ensures a stringent pilot qualification process.

== Structures ==
The School was originally based at Lecce-Galatina Air Base (Puglia), which was also used by the ItAF's 61st Wing that also operate Aermacchi MB.339 basic-advanced jet trainers that was replaced by the Aermacchi M-345 single engine jet trainer in 2021.

In 2022 the IFTS was relocated to Sardinia, on the Decimomannu Air Base.

The school covers a total area of 130,000 sqm, Approximately 35,000 sqm are dedicated to buildings currently under construction.

== Training programme ==
The IFTS’ training programme is dedicated to advanced pilot training, the so-called Phase IV (Advanced/Lead-In Fighter Training or LIFT), preparing pilots for flying on next generation fighters.

The IFTS School offers customised training modules, tailored to the proficiency and output standard required each time by the air forces’ specific needs and syllabus and that are made in such a way to minimize the time a student has to spend at the Operational Conversion Unit (OCU).

On October 26 2021, Italy and Japan reached an arrangement for the training of Japanese military pilots at the International Flight Training School (IFTS). After Qatar and Germany, Japan is the third country to choose IFTS to train its pilots.

In 2025 it was reported that RAF pilots were training with the M-346 at IFTS. According to the Ministry of Defence, six RAF pilots completed their training at the Sardinian base during the 2024–25 training year, with a further two RAF pilots forecast to complete their training during 2025–26 and three in 2026–27.

The International Flight Training School recently awarded the first Phase IV (Advanced/Lead-In to Fighter Training) diploma to two pilots of the Luftwaffe, the German Air Force, further to the completion of their training.

Training courses in the IFTS are provided jointly by Leonardo and Canadian flight training provider CAE. In July 2026 it was announced that the partnership would be broadening the training materials to cover future M-346 configurations including the latest Block 20 digital variants, and prepare aircrews for artificial intelligence-enabled and increasingly autonomous operations.

== Equipment and technologies ==
The flight training is carried out with the 22 Aermacchi M-346 Master high-performance advanced training aircraft, built by Leonardo S.p.A. and put at the School's disposal (18 belonging to the Italian Air Force and 4 directly delivered by Leonardo to the IFTS, last one delivered at the end of October 2019).

The Aermacchi M-346 Master is equipped with an on-board simulation suite: through the Embedded Tactical Training System (ETTS), which has been developed by Leonardo, students can be exposed to realistic simulated tactical scenarios, with threats and targets, simulating on-board sensors (i.e. multimode fire control radar, targeting pod) and weapons. The Ground Based Training System (GBTS) includes state-of-the-art full mission simulators by CAE and other advanced training devices. Exploiting LVC technology by Leonardo, students on-board of real aircraft (Live) can interact with pilots in the simulators (Virtual) and Computer Generated Forces (Constructive) within the same training mission.

The Integrated Training System employed for phase IV training exploits the Training Management and Information System (TMIS), a management software developed by Leonardo's Aircraft Division, under the supervision of the Italian Air Force School Command. The software enables to schedule and plan the daily training activities in an automated way, with a careful monitoring and management of pilots and instructor pilots’ progress. Within the IFTS, this software has been used for the first time in 2019.

== See also ==
- Italian Air Force
- Leonardo S.p.A.
