= Decimomannu Air Base =

Decimomannu Air Base

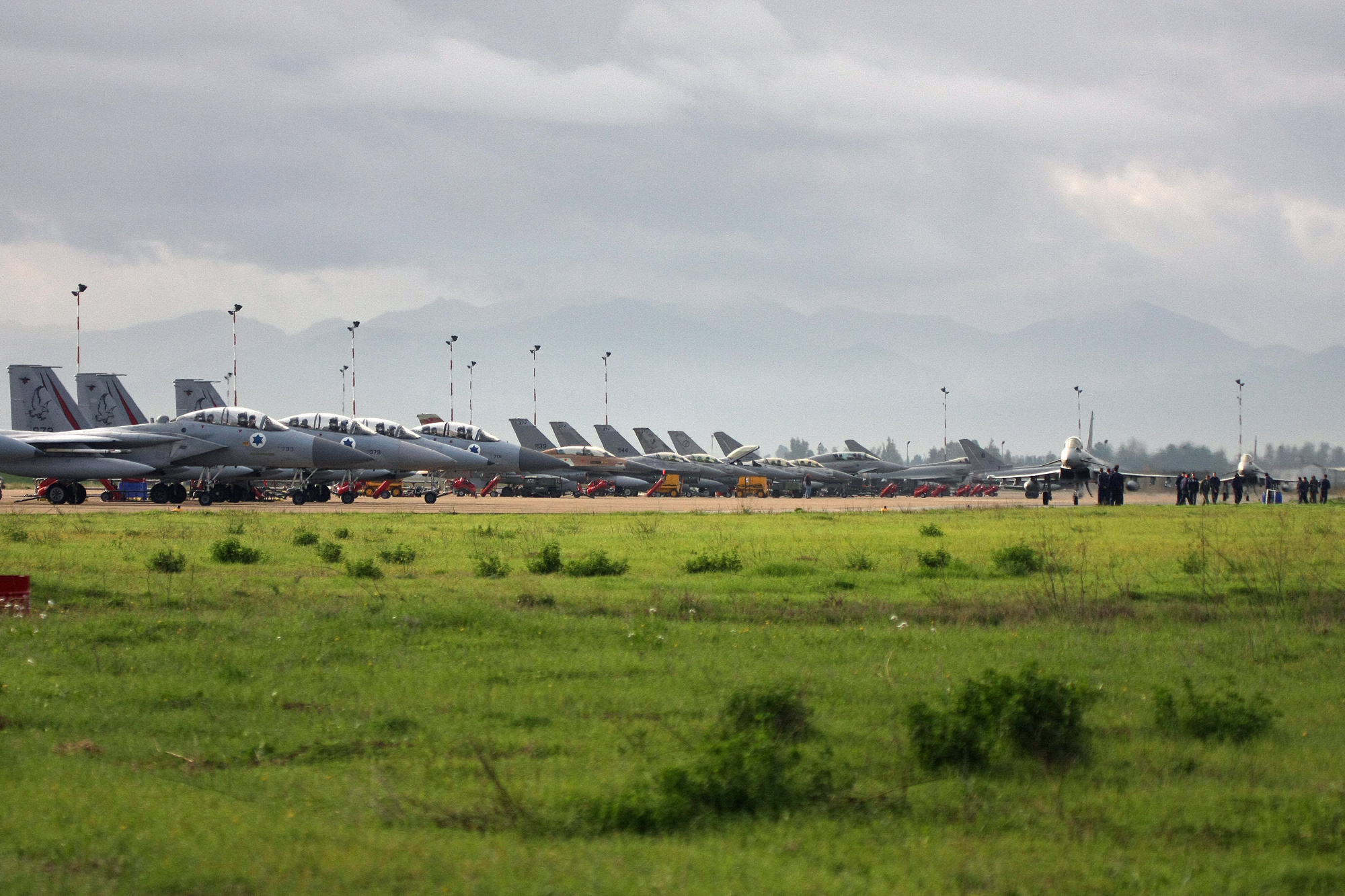
- IATA: DCI; ICAO: LIED

Summary
- Airport type: Military
- Location: Decimomannu, Sardinia, Italy
- Elevation AMSL: 100 ft (30 m)
- Coordinates: 39°21′15″N 008°58′20″E

Map
- Location of airport in Italy

Runways
Direction	Length		Surface
Direction	m	ft	Surface
17L/35R	2,990	9,810	Asphalt
17R/35L	2,611	8,565	Asphalt
- Source: DAFIF

Decimomannu Air Base (IATA: DCI, ICAO: LIED) is an Italian Air Force (Aeronautica Militare) air base located approximately 5 km (2.7 NM) north of Decimomannu a comune in the Province of Cagliari on the island of Sardinia in Italy.

It is a military airport located northwest of the city of Cagliari, Sardinia, in a vast area between the towns of Decimomannu, Decimoputzu, San Sperate and Villasor.

The airport is named after Colonel pilot Giovanni Farina, Gold Medal for bravery, died in combat in the skies of Sardinia 14 June 1942.

The airfield is a front-line NATO training facility primarily used since 1979 for Dissimilar Air Combat Training (DACT) of various NATO air force fighter aircraft.

Decimonannu was also the Home Base for the Taktisches Ausbildungskommando der Luftwaffe Italien and the base was used for training flights.

Since July 2022 it has been home to the International Flight Training School.

== History ==
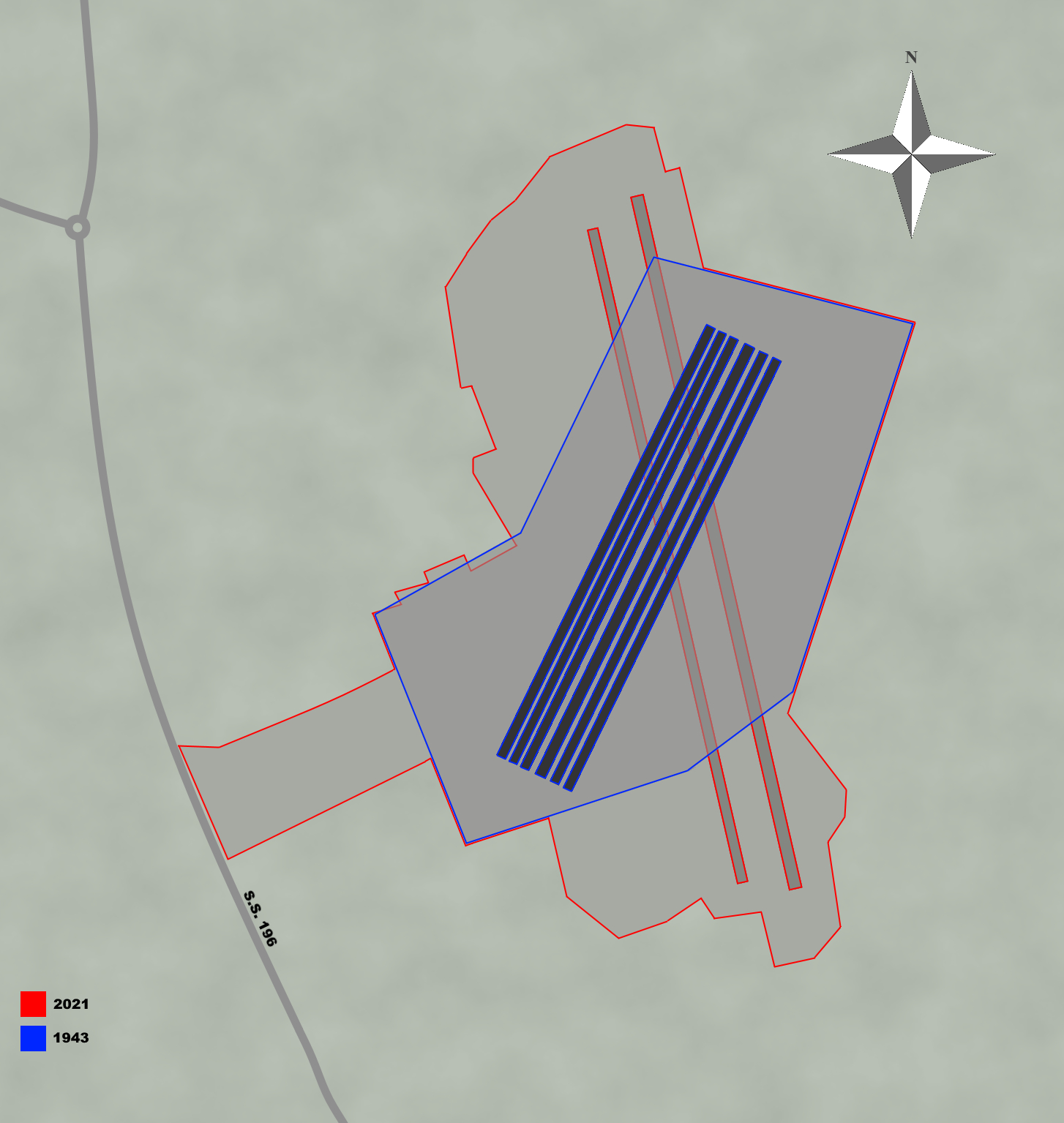
Comparison between the structure of the airport in 1943 (blue) and in 2021 (red)

Decimomannu became in effect a military airport on 3 June 1940 with the transfer of the Italian 32º Wing from Cagliari Elmas.

During World War II the airport served both Axis powers and Allied forces.

Between 1941 and 1943 the airport hosted the 36º Wing equipped with Savoia-Marchetti SM79 and Savoia-Marchetti SM.84 bombers.

On 27 September 1941 the airport forces were involved in a bloody battle with the Royal Navy and the Royal Air Force in the central Mediterranean.

On 17 February 1943, the airport was bombed by the Anglo-American allies.

In 1943 following the Armistice of Cassibile, the airport came under the control of the United States Army who used it as a base for Curtiss P-40 Warhawk fighter aircraft of the United States Army Air Forces (USAAF).

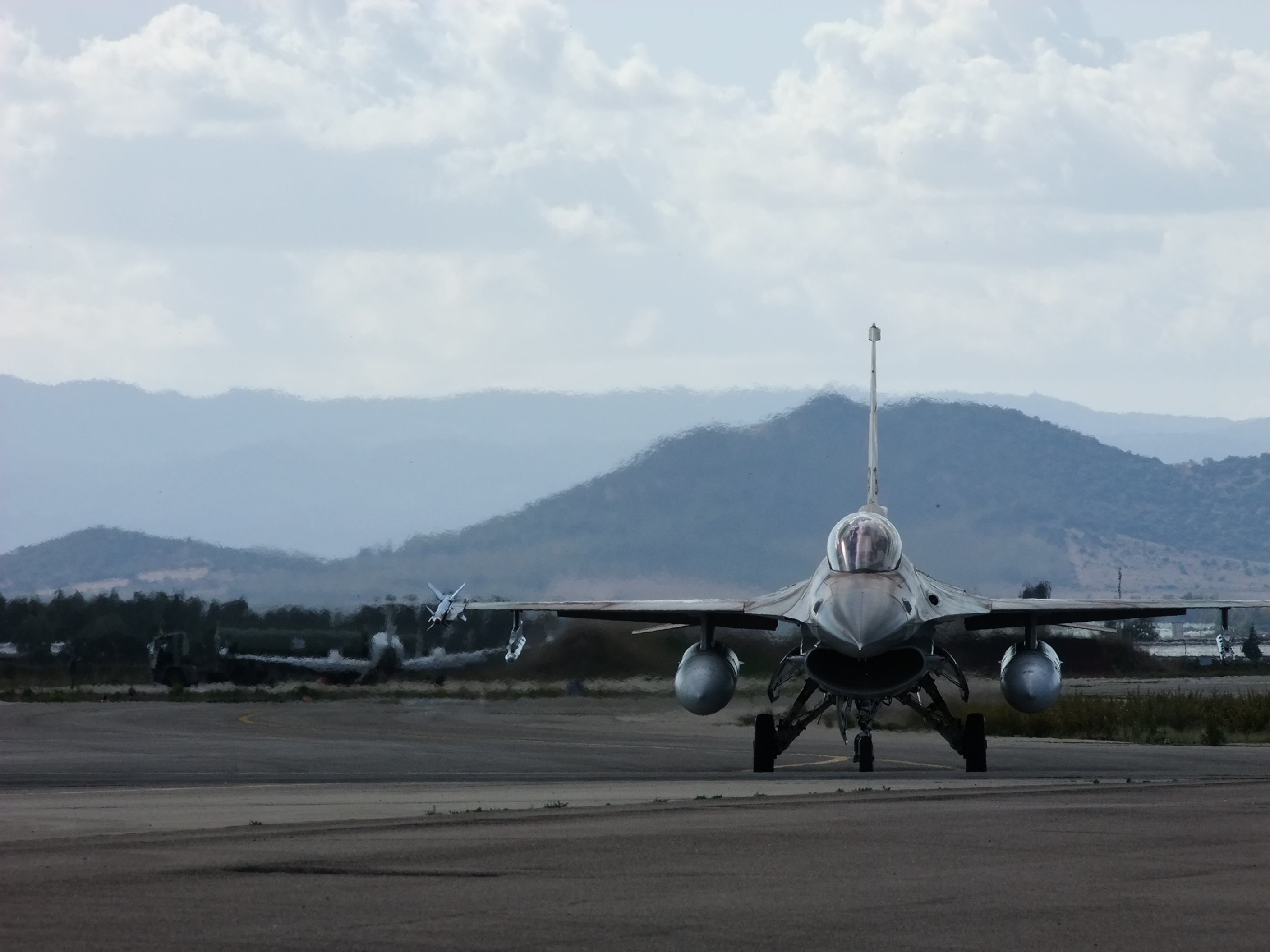

Decimomannu airfield was used by the USAAF Twelfth Air Force 320th Bombardment Group, which flew Martin B-26 Marauder medium bombers from the field between 1 November 1943 and 21 September 1944.

The American author Joseph Heller, while writing his novel Catch-22, was inspired by some events that happened in the Decimomannu airbase in 1944.

In April 1957 an "Air Weapons Training Installation" (AWTI) unit was established by the Royal Canadian Air Force (RCAF).

In December 1959 an agreement was signed between Italy, Canada and West Germany, which regulated the use of the air base and firing ranges associated with it.

Over the years the base saw a growing increase in flights. Decimomannu during 1970 and 2000 was consecrated as the airport with the highest number of takeoffs and landings in Europe, with an average of about 60000 movements per year, equal to about 450 daily movements.

Currently, the main user of the airport is the Italian Air Force. The German Air Force (Luftwaffe) left the airport in December 2016 because of the restrictions about flying and rising costs.

== Facilities ==
The airport resides at an elevation of 100 feet (30 m) above mean sea level. It has two asphalt paved runways: 17L/35R measuring 2,990 by 45 metres (9,810 ft × 148 ft) and 17R/35L measuring 2,611 by 23 metres (8,566 ft × 75 ft).

== See also ==
- Air combat maneuvering instrumentation - equipment used to enable aircraft to use the related range facilities
