= Selex ES =

2013–2015 subsidiary of Finmeccanica S.p.A.

Coordinates: 55°58′10″N 3°14′04″W

Selex ES S.p.A. Selex ES Ltd
- Type: Subsidiary of Finmeccanica SpA, (today Leonardo)
- Traded as: BIT: FNC
- Industry: Airborne & Space Systems, Land & Naval Defence Electronics and Security & Information Systems
- Predecessor: SELEX Galileo, SELEX Elsag, SELEX Sistemi Integrati
- Founded: 2013
- Defunct: December 31, 2015 (aged 2) (merged into Finmeccanica S.p.A. today Leonardo)
- Headquarters: Basildon, UK - Rome, Italy
- Key people: Roberto Cingolani (CEO)
- Products: Air Traffic Control, Automated Systems, Avionics and Mission Systems, Automation Systems, Electronic Warfare Systems, Cameras, Cyber Security, Electro-Optics, ICT and Networking, Information Assurance, IR Detectors, Land and Battlefield System, Lasers, Naval and Air Defence Systems, Radars and Advanced Targeting, Security, Seekers, Sensors, Simulators, Smart Systems, Vessel Traffic Management Systems, Unmanned Aerial Systems, Sensors and Scientific Payloads for Space and Support Services
- Revenue: € 3,5 billion
- Number of employees: 16,000 (at 31 december 2015)
- Parent: Finmeccanica until 31 December 2015
- Website: https://www.leonardo.com/en/home

Selex ES was a subsidiary of Finmeccanica, active in the electronics and information technology business, based in Italy and the UK, and formed in January 2013, following Finmeccanica's decision to combine its existing SELEX Elsag and SELEX Sistemi Integrati businesses into SELEX Galileo, the immediate predecessor of Selex ES. From 1 January 2016, the activities of Selex ES merged into Leonardo-Finmeccanica's Electronics, Defence and Security Systems Sector becoming Leonardo S.p.A.

Selex ES's activities had been organised in three Divisions within the sector: Airborne & Space Systems, Land and Naval Defence Electronics and Security and Information Systems.

== History ==
=== Predecessor companies ===
In July 2003 Finmeccanica and BAE Systems signed a joint venture agreement with the intention of merging their avionics, C4ISR and communications businesses to create three joint venture partnerships under the name Eurosystems. The difficulties of integrating the companies in this way however led to a re-evaluation of the proposal. BAE's 2004 Annual Report states that "recognising the complexity of the earlier proposed ... transaction with Finmeccanica we have moved to a simpler model."

This revised agreement was signed on 27 January 2005. Finmeccanica and BAE announced the intention to dissolve their partnership in the Alenia Marconi Systems (AMS) joint venture with AMS' UK and Italian operations to be taken over by the respective partners.

On 3 May 2005 the Eurosystems Transaction was finalised with

- the whole of the avionics business of Finmeccanica and the majority of BAE Systems Avionics being brought together to form the new SELEX Sensors and Airborne Systems (SELEX S&AS) joint venture held by shares of 75% and 25% respectively, with the option for Finmeccanica to later purchase the remaining 25%.
- the UK operation of AMS (minus air traffic control and communication systems) being brought together with the C4ISR division of BAE Systems (minus communication systems) to form the new Integrated System Technologies division of BAE Systems, named BAE Systems Insyte.
- the Italian operations of AMS being brought together with several other AMS companies to form SELEX Sistemi Integrati.
- the communications systems portions of AMS and BAE Systems being sold to Selenia Communications, a division of Finmeccanica. Selenia was subsequently renamed SELEX Communications.

BAE Systems sold its 25% share of SELEX S&AS to Finmeccanica for €400 million in March 2007.

From January 2008, SELEX S&AS Limited and its Italian counterpart Galileo Avionica S.p.A. began to operate under a common brand name, SELEX Galileo. In January 2010, the operating companies’ legal names were aligned to the brand, becoming SELEX Galileo Ltd and SELEX Galileo S.p.A. respectively. SELEX Sensors and Airborne Systems (US) Inc. became SELEX Galileo Inc.

In 2009 SELEX Sistemi Integrati purchased Vega Group PLC, forming in the UK SELEX Systems Integration Ltd and Vega Consulting Services Ltd.

In 2011 SELEX Communications merged with Elsag Datamat to establish SELEX Elsag.

=== Merger of SELEX companies ===
On 1 January 2013, SELEX Galileo became Selex ES when it merged with its sister companies SELEX Sistemi Integrati and SELEX Elsag. The combined business had a global workforce of approximately 17,000, and total revenues in excess of €3.5 billion. Alongside its core domestic operations in Italy and the UK, the company has an established industrial and commercial footprint in the United States, Germany, Turkey, Romania, Brazil, Saudi Arabia and India.

=== Recent news ===
In 2012 it was reported a previous Selex company had provided TETRA trunked radio network hardware to the Assad regime, and amid sanctions continued to expand the company's contract with the regime during the context of the Syrian Civil War.

In August 2013, Selex ES provided an unarmed surveillance drone to the United Nations to be deployed in the Democratic Republic of Congo to monitor movements of armed groups in the region and to protect the civilian population more effectively.

In 2015, they secured a cybersecurity contract with NATO.

In 2016, it secured a contract with Angola that will see equipment, replacement components and any associated services be provided to the nation's upcoming centers for maritime surveillance.

== Organisation ==
Till 31 December 2015, the company was focused into three international divisions:

- The Air and Space Systems division included all airborne capabilities, technologies and products ranging from UAS and integrated mission systems to radar, electronic warfare equipment, avionics, simulation systems, target drones and space sensors, payloads and equipment.
- The Land and Naval Systems division comprised capabilities in the land and naval domains from the design of complex system architectures to tactical integrated systems, naval combat management systems, land and naval radar and situational awareness sensors and military communications infrastructures.
- The Security and Information Systems division covered network infrastructure and systems architecture capabilities for homeland protection and the complex urban environment as well as air and vessel traffic management.

== Related products ==
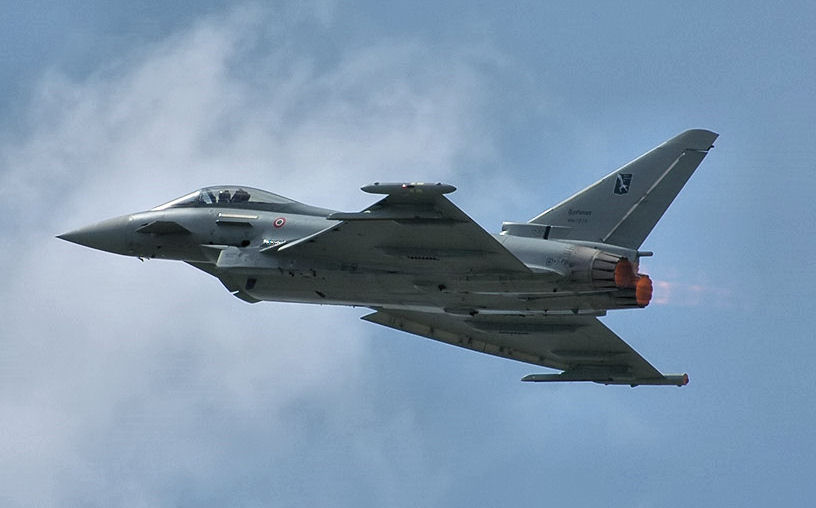
SELEX is a major supplier of avionics for the Eurofighter Typhoon.

- ATOS
- AULOS passive radar
- BriteCloud (Gripen)
- EMPAR
- Euroradar CAPTOR (Eurofighter)
- Falco UAV
- HIDAS (AgustaWestland Apache)
- Main Operating Centre (Expo 2015)
- Mirach 26
- Mirach 150
- Miysis DIRCM
- NA-25X fire-control system
- Personal Role Radio
- Picosar AESA radar
- Pirate IRST (Eurofighter)
- Raven ES-05 AESA radar (Gripen)
- SkyISTAR (P.1HH HammerHead Unmanned Aerial System)
- Skyward-G IRST (Gripen)
- SLX Hawk Infrared Camera (HotSpot)
- Selex RAN-40L
- Selex RAT-31DL

== Locations and activities ==
At 31 December 2015, the Company employed 17,000 personnel with operations in the United Kingdom, Italy and throughout the world.

UK sites include:

- Basildon (UK Head Office) - Electro-Optics & Battlespace, Land Systems, Homeland Security and Future Systems Group.
- Bristol – Training and Simulation, Cyber security and Communication Systems, Professional Services and Service Management in the areas of Cyber Security and Information Assurance.
- Edinburgh - Airborne Radar, Laser Systems, Electro-Optics, Advanced Projects and APS sectors. The site also hosts the Micro Electronics Group and Laser Centre of Excellence.
- Luton (CG) - An Electronic Warfare Centre of Excellence with specific expertise in Airborne Integrated Defence Aids Systems, ISTAR – Intelligence, Surveillance, Targeting, Acquisition & Reconnaissance and Fixed Wing & Operational Support.
- Portsmouth - Precision Casting Centre (PCC)
- Southampton - Infrared detectors, Network Communications Systems and Naval Communications.
- ParcAberporth - UAV flight trials facility
- Lincoln - A purpose-built Electronic Warfare Operational Support (EWOS) Centre and Training Academy providing the expertise and facilities to develop EW Sovereign Capability.

Italian sites include:

- Rome - Legal and Corporate Affairs, Marketing and Commercial and External Relations
- Nerviano - Avionics, Radar and Space technology
- Caselle - Avionics, Mission & Surveillance Systems and Safety Critical Systems
- Ronchi dei Legionari - UAVs and Flight Training Simulators
- Florence - Electro-Optic systems, equipment & sensors and NAVAL IRST; Future Soldier's equipment; Surface, Airborne & Space, Ship Radars (LPI & PAR); Space Equipment & Sensors, Radar Systems and Sonics.
- Pomezia - Airborne Electro-Optical Systems and Cockpit Information Systems
- Carsoli (L’Aquila) - Optical Coatings
- Palermo - Microwave Components and Solid State Sub-systems.

== International presence & subsidiaries ==
- Larimart – Italy
- Selex Service Management – Italy
- Sirio Panel – Italy
- Sistemi Software Integrati – Italy
- Selex ES Marine – UK
- Selex ES Yacht Technologies – UK
- Selex ES Australia
- Selex ES Do Brazil
- Tactical Technologies Inc - Canada
- SELEX ES GmbH – Germany
- Vega Deutschland GmbH – Germany
- Selex ES India
- ELETTRA Communications - Romania
- Selex Galileo - Saudi Arabia
- Selex ES Elektronik - Turkey
- SELEX ES Inc – USA
- SELEX GALILEO Inc – USA
- Lasertel - USA
- Sirio Panel - USA

== Corporate social responsibility ==
The company had a policy of sustainability and social responsibility and was involved in local charitable, educational and environmental initiatives across its global footprint.

The company's IGNITE in India programme is part of the wider International Graduate Network Integrated Through Experience. The programme allows graduates to develop entrepreneurial skills and transfer good business practice in developing countries. The programme's emphasis is on socially sustainable initiatives.

Selex ES ‘A. Tiezzi’ Museum of Science - Situated close to company's Campi Bisenzio site near Florence: the museum now managed by Finmeccanica, takes visitors on a journey through the story of Italian radar, to the latest electronic devices. It features space technology, avionics equipment, meters and didactic instruments all of which demonstrate the value of over 100 years of continuous research dedicated to science and technology.

The company had also opened the Museo del Radar in recognition of the part radar manufacturing enterprises has played our industrial age. The Radar Museum, now managed by Finmeccanica, the first created by a company in Europe, is founded on the principles of reclaiming, reorganising and keeping alive the history of radar manufacturing, which began in Italy over 60 years ago at the company's Fusaro site (Naples).

In the UK Selex ES sponsored the Combined Services Disabled Ski Team (CSDST), which enables members to pursue the sport and help rehabilitate those who have suffered a serious injury. It is hoped that some CSDST members may represent Great Britain in the 2018 Winter Paralympics in Pyeongchang, South Korea. To date, the company has raised over £80,000 for CSDST through several fundraising activities.

== See also ==
- Aerospace industry in the United Kingdom
- List of Italian companies
