= SELEX Sistemi Integrati =

Electronics manufacturing company in Italy

SELEX Sistemi Integrati S.p.A.
- Type: Società per Azioni
- Industry: Aerospace, defence, and telecommunications
- Founded: 5 May 2005
- Fate: Merged into Selex ES on 1 January 2013
- Headquarters: Rome, Italy
- Number of employees: approx. 4,500
- Parent: Finmeccanica
- Subsidiaries: SELEX Systems Integration Ltd. SELEX Systems Integration Inc. SELEX Systems Integration Gmbh
- Website: https://www.leonardo.com/en/home

SELEX Sistemi Integrati S.p.A. was an aerospace, defence and security-related electronics manufacturing company headquartered in Rome, Italy, and a wholly owned subsidiary of Finmeccanica. It designed and developed systems for homeland security; systems and radar sensors for air defence, battlefield management, naval warfare, coastal and maritime surveillance; air traffic control; and turn-key airport solutions. The company had around 4,500 employees. On 1 January 2013, it merged with its sister companies SELEX Galileo and SELEX Elsag to form Selex ES.

== History ==
In 1951, Finmeccanica and the United States–based company Raytheon formed Microlambda, a joint venture based in Fusaro near Naples, operating in the field of applied electronics and producing radar systems under licence for land and naval applications.

In 1956, a new company, SINDEL, was established with capital provided by Edison (hydroelectric and gas distribution). Several engineers and technicians from Microlambda moved to the company which was specialised in professional electronics.

In 1960, an international agreement led to the creation of Selenia – Associated Electronics Industries, a joint venture focused on civil and military surveillance systems whose shareholders were Finmeccanica (40%), Raytheon (40%) and Edison (20%).

In 1990, Selenia merged with Aeritalia, an Italian aerospace company, forming Alenia, which had more than 30,000 employees, dealing with aeronautics, radars, naval systems, missiles, space applications, aircraft engines, as well as systems for environmental protection. In the late 1990s Alenia was split into two companies in order to focus on its core activities more effectively: Alenia Aerospazio specialising in the design and production of aircraft and space systems, and Alenia Difesa dealing with radars, missiles, naval systems, avionics, together with the company Otobreda.

In the mid-1990s, the management of Alenia Difesa decided to form an international alliance. The chosen partner was the British firm GEC-Marconi, and Alenia Marconi Systems (later AMS) came into being in 1998 with shareholding divided equally between Finmeccanica and GEC-Marconi. A few months later, Marconi merged with British Aerospace, forming BAE Systems. In 2005 Finmeccanica acquired BAE Systems' interests in the Italian operations of Alenia Marconi Systems, together with BAE Systems' UK-based Air Traffic Management (ATM) and Air Traffic Control (ATC) (former Air Traffic Management and Airport Systems Division) and the USA (former ASI Inc.), and SELEX Sistemi Integrati was established as a wholly owned subsidiary of Finmeccanica.

On 1 July 2010 the Defence, Logistics and Environment operations of Elsag Datamat were transferred to SELEX Sistemi Integrati, together with Elsag's subsidiary Space Software Italia and the activities related to the PAR (Precision Approach Radar) radar systems for surface, land and naval applications, formerly owned by SELEX Galileo.

== Operations ==
=== Facilities ===
In Italy SELEX Sistemi Integrati had facilities in Rome, Fusaro (Naples), Giugliano (Naples), Nerviano (Milan), Genoa, La Spezia and Taranto. Outside of Italy it had operations in the United Kingdom (SELEX Systems Integration Ltd and VEGA Consulting Services – focused on defence and security), Germany (SELEX Systems Integration GmbH – focused on weather radar systems), and the United States (SELEX Systems Integration Inc – focused on air navigation aids).

=== Sectors ===
SELEX Sistemi Integrati's activities were organised into three main sectors: Large Systems (homeland security and territory protection), Civil Systems (airport and air traffic management, coastal and maritime surveillance), and Defence Systems (land, naval and air applications).

==== Large Systems ====
Within the Finmeccanica Group SELEX Sistemi Integrati was the Design Authority and Prime Contractor for the design, development, manufacture and sale of Large Systems for Homeland Protection, which includes solutions for homeland security and defence. Solutions for Homeland Security comprised protection of territory and environment, borders, people, institutions and national and critical infrastructures. In this sector the company also realised systems for major events and crisis management. Solutions for Homeland Defence are related to the design and realisation of net-centric architectures able to operate into an inter-force and interoperable context to reach the superiority of information.

==== Civil Systems ====
The domain of technologies and critical capabilities in the field of Large Systems allowed the company to offer products for Air Traffic Management, including turn key airport systems. The company also offered products for maritime and coastal surveillance with its Vessel Traffic Management System.

==== Defence Systems ====
SELEX Sistemi Integrati was active in the design, development and sale of integrated combat naval systems, combat management systems, command and control systems, fire control systems, radar and electro-optical sensors, simulation and training systems. SELEX Sistemi Integrati also offered support mission systems including planning and mission systems, information management systems for the logistic process support and test and validation integrated systems.

With the fixed (FADR) and deployable (DADR) version of RAT31DL, SELEX Sistemi Integrati was the main European supplier of 3D long-range radar into the NATO area.

== Radar Museum ==
On April 2, 2009, SELEX Sistemi Integrati opened the Radar Museum, the first created by a company in Europe. The Radar Museum is founded on the principles of reclaiming, reorganizing and keeping alive the history of radar manufacturing, which, in Italy, began about 60 years ago in the Fusaro site (Naples). The Radar Museum covers an area of about 750 square metres divided into four zones: exhibition area, documents archive, simulation area and conference room. The exhibition also includes an external area featuring some of the most significant radar antennas developed and built by SELEX Sistemi Integrati in the past.

== See also ==
- List of Italian companies
