= Leonardo S.p.A. =

Italian defence and aerospace company

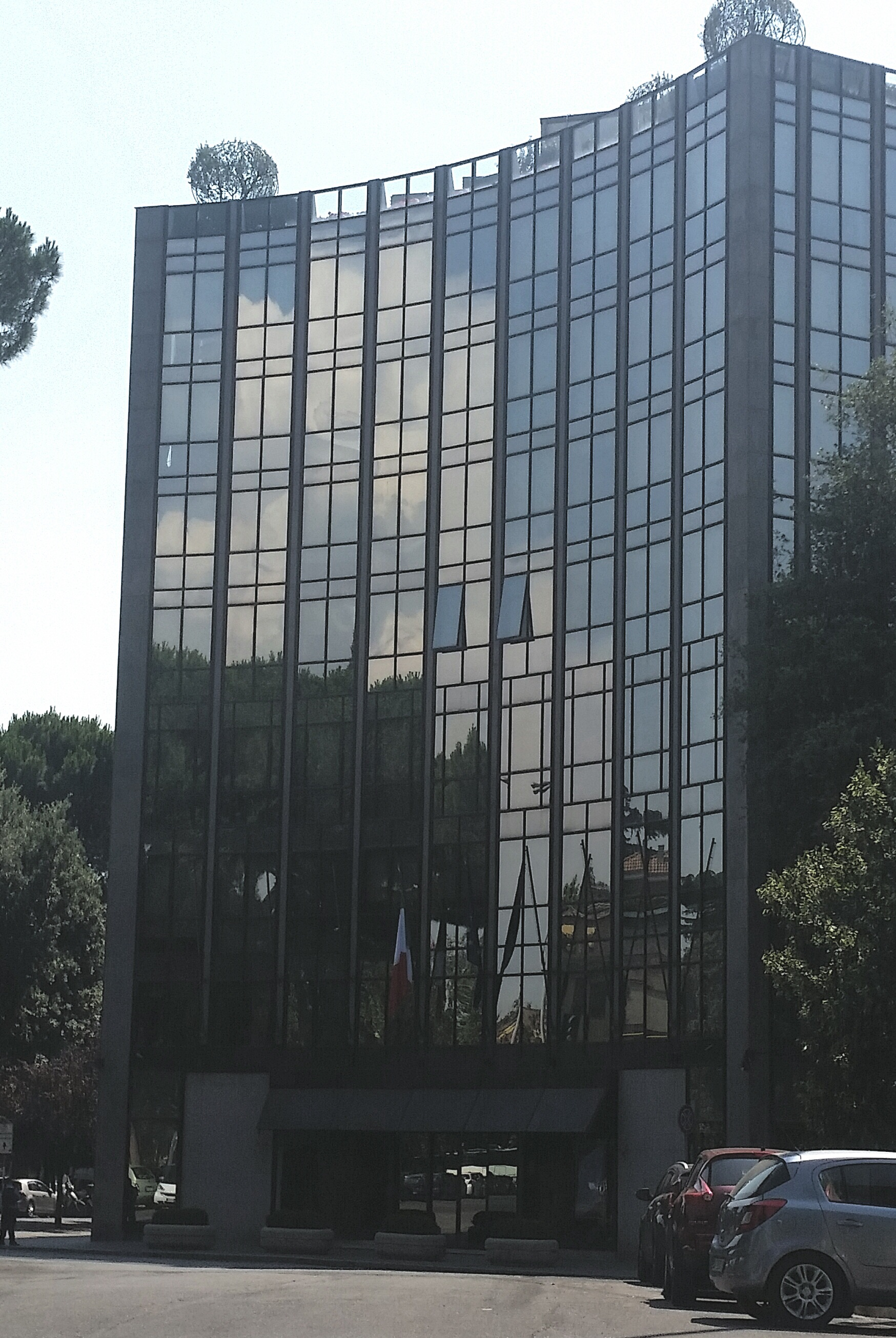
- Formerly: Finmeccanica (1948–2016); Leonardo-Finmeccanica (2016)
- Type: Public
- Traded as: BIT: LDO; FTSE MIB component
- ISIN: IT0003856405
- Industry: Aerospace · Defence
- Founded: 1948; 78 years ago
- Headquarters: Rome, Italy
- Area served: Worldwide
- Key people: Francesco Macrì (chairman); Lorenzo Mariani (CEO and general manager)
- Revenue: ▲€19.503 billion (2025)
- Operating income: ▲€1.447 billion (2025)
- Net income: ▲€1.334 billion (2025)
- Total assets: ▲€34.509 billion (2025)
- Total equity: ▲€10.740 billion (2025)
- Owner: Ministero dell’Economia e delle Finanze (30.2%)
- Number of employees: 62,762 (2025)
- Subsidiaries: Leonardo DRS (72.3%); ATR (50%); LBA Systems (50%, joint Baykar and Leonardo partnership); Avio (29.63%); Eurofighter GmbH (21%); Hensoldt (22.8%); LRMV (50%); MBDA (25%); NHIndustries (32%); Telespazio (67%); Thales Alenia Space (33%)
- Website: www.leonardo.com

Leonardo S.p.A., is an Italian multinational company specialising in aerospace, defence and security. Headquartered in Rome, the company has 180 sites worldwide. It is the 12th largest defence contractor in the world based on 2020 revenues. The company is partially owned by the Italian government, which holds 30.2% of the company's shares and is its largest shareholder.

On 1 January 2016, Leonardo-Finmeccanica became a single industrial company by integrating the activities of its subsidiaries AgustaWestland, Alenia Aermacchi, DRS Technologies, Selex ES, OTO Melara and WASS. The company is organised into five divisions (Helicopters, Aircraft, Aerostructures, Electronics, Cybersecurity). It is also the parent company and corporate centre for the subsidiaries and joint ventures Telespazio, Thales Alenia Space, MBDA and ATR. Leonardo is listed on the Borsa Italiana and is a constituent of the FTSE MIB and Dow Jones Sustainability Indices.

The company changed its name to Leonardo S.p.A. on 1 January 2017, after the Italian inventor Leonardo da Vinci.

== History ==
=== Foundation ===
Società Finanziaria Meccanica, "Finmeccanica", was established in 1948 as the mechanical engineering subholding of the state-owned Istituto per la Ricostruzione Industriale (IRI). Finmeccanica has held for years some historic Italian enterprises, as Alfa Romeo (automobiles), Aeritalia (aerospace) and Ansaldo (engineering).

From the 1960s to the 1980s Italy's defence and aerospace industry was split into state-holding entities: EFIM owned the helicopters manufacturer Agusta, the defence company Oto Melara and the electronic enterprise Officine Galileo. STET (another IRI subsidiary) held Selenia, Elsag and SGS Thomson, all electronic enterprises with specialisations in security and defence. In 1989, an internal IRI reorganisation process brought STET electronic enterprises to Finmeccanica, and the Aeritalia-Selenia merger constituted its aerospace subsidiary Alenia.

=== 1990s ===
In 1992, EFIM was wound up because of its troubled financial situation; and Agusta, Oto Melara, Officine Galileo and Breda passed to Finmeccanica, which became one of the main Italian industrial groups. Finmeccanica, which was previously fully state owned by IRI, became partly privatised in 1993, when it was listed on the Milan Borsa Italiana stock exchange.

In 1992, Finmeccanica's Agusta became a 32% partner in NHIndustries, the prime contractor for the NH90 helicopter, along with Eurocopter (62.5%) and Fokker (5.5%).

=== 2000s ===
In July 2000 Finmeccanica and the British GKN agreed to merge their respective helicopter subsidiaries (Agusta and GKN-Westland Helicopters) to form AgustaWestland. In December 2001, the missile business of Alenia Marconi Systems (AMS), a joint Finmeccanica/BAE Systems company, was merged with other European missile manufacturers to form MBDA, which became the world's second largest missile manufacturer. In July 2003 Finmeccanica and BAE Systems announced their intention to set up three joint venture companies, to be collectively known as Eurosystems. These companies would have pooled the avionics, C4ISTAR and communications businesses of the two companies.

In March 2007, BAE Systems sold its 25% share to Finmeccanica for €400 million. In January 2013 the company merged with Finmeccanica's other defence electronics companies, SELEX Elsag and SELEX Sistemi Integrati, to become Selex ES. In May 2008 Finmeccanica announced its intention to purchase the U.S. defence contractor DRS Technologies for nearly $5.2 billion. In October 2008 the sale of DRS Technologies was finalised.

=== 2010s ===
During 2011–2013, Finmeccanica emails were published by WikiLeaks and Finmeccanica was subject to judicial inquiries on several fronts and management changes.

According to Finmeccanica emails published in the Syria Files release by WikiLeaks on 5 July 2012, Finmeccanica increased its sale of mobile communications equipment to Syrian authorities during 2011, delivering 500 of these to the Damascus suburb Muadamia in May 2011, after the Syrian uprising had started, and sending engineers to Damascus in February 2012 to provide training in using the communications equipment in helicopter terminals, while the uprising continued. Finmeccanica stated that the equipment sales were legal, they occurred "before the outbreak of conflict inside Syria", and the equipment "was designed for use by emergency responders" for civilian use only.

On 12 February 2013, the chief executive, Giuseppe Orsi, was arrested on corruption charges. Prosecutors alleged that he paid bribes to ensure the sale of 12 helicopters to the Indian government, when he was head of the group's AgustaWestland unit. In 2019, he was fully acquitted of all charges by the Italian judiciary.

In July 2013, the Letta government appointed former police chief Giovanni De Gennaro as Chairman of Finmeccanica. In December 2013 Finmeccanica sold 39.55% of its share capital in Ansaldo Energia to Fondo Strategico Italiano.

In the first half of 2014, Finmeccanica's new chief executive officer and General Manager Mauro Moretti started a significant process of change for the Group, both in terms of strategic choices and organisational structure. The goal was to create a more cohesive and efficient group in which all processes (research, marketing and sales, engineering, procurement, strategies and governance) are centralised and integrated and can interact each other. This encompasses the 100% owned companies of the core aerospace and defence business (AgustaWestland, Alenia Aermacchi, Oto Melara, Selex ES and WASS) being transformed into seven new Finmeccanica divisions. The current holding company will then become an operating company based on seven major business areas, maintaining its parent company and corporate centre function for the Group companies excluded from the model (DRS Technologies, Telespazio, Thales Alenia Space, MBDA and ATR).

At the end of 2014, Finmeccanica transferred its stake in BredaMenarinibus to the newco Industria Italiana Autobus (20% Finmeccanica and 80% King Long), thereby taking a further step in the Group's portfolio rationalisation process.

In 2015, Hitachi signed a binding agreement with Finmeccanica for Hitachi's acquisition of the AnsaldoBreda business, excluding some revamping activities and residual contracts, and of the entire Finmeccanica stake in the share capital of Ansaldo STS, approximately 40% of the total capital.

FATA, another subsidiary of the Finmeccanica Group since 2004 that was not part of the core business, was sold in 2015 to the Gruppo Danieli, dealing in the production of steel plants.

On 1 January 2016, Finmeccanica became a single integrated industrial entity, that absorbed the activities of AgustaWestland, Alenia Aermacchi, Selex ES, OTO Melara and WASS.

=== From Finmeccanica to Leonardo ===
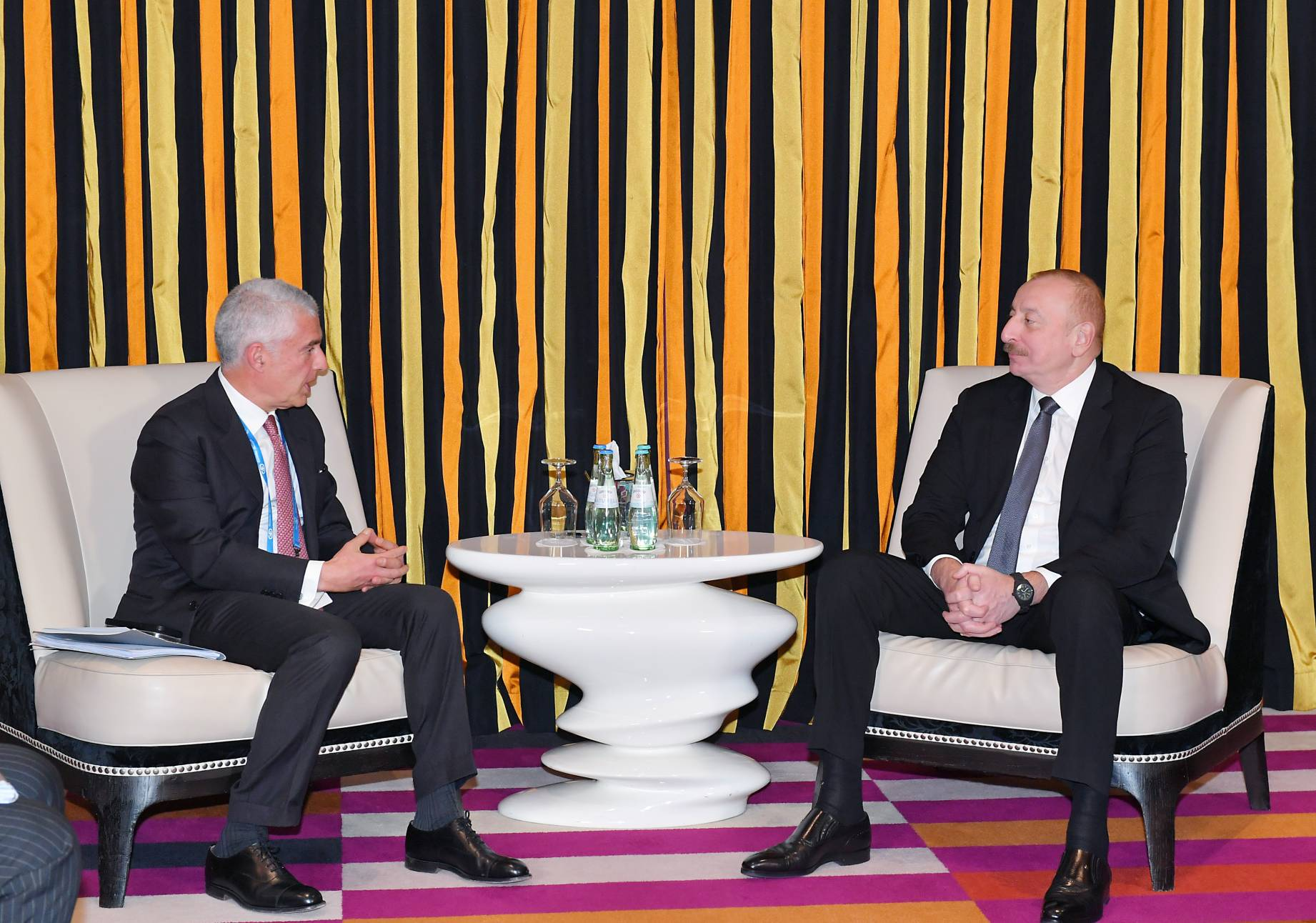
Co-General Manager Lorenzo Mariani with Azerbaijan's President Ilham Aliyev, 16 February 2024

A company rebranding operation led by Mauro Moretti began in March 2016, with a proposal to change the company name. From 1 January 2017 Finmeccanica officially became Leonardo, a name inspired by the Italian savant Leonardo da Vinci. In March 2017 the Italian Treasury proposed that the veteran banker Alessandro Profumo replace Mauro Moretti as CEO of Leonardo. In May 2017 the Board appointed Alessandro Profumo to the role.

=== 2020s ===
On 10 May 2023 the Board of Directors appointed Roberto Cingolani to the position of chief executive officer and General Manager, Stefano Pontecorvo to the role of chairman, and Lorenzo Mariani to the role of Co-General Manager. In 2025 Turkish defence firm Baykar and Leonardo decided to cooperate in the field of unmanned aerial vehicles.

In December 2022, it was announced that the United Kingdom, Italy and Japan were launching a new trilateral collaboration in the form of the Global Combat Air Programme or GCAP, and that BAE Systems would be joining Leonardo and Mitsubishi Heavy Industries as the three prime industrial partners for the initiative. The GCAP would develop a new sixth-generation, AI- and stealth-enabled combat aircraft that would reduce dependency on US military aircraft technology.

In 2024, this was formalised as BAE Systems, Leonardo and the Japan Aircraft Industrial Enhancement Co (JAIEC), which is partly funded by Mitsubishi Heavy Industries agreed to establish a joint venture company, with each holding a 33.3 per cent share in the new group, giving them an equal degree of influence over the project. In June 2026, the UK government announced that as part of the Defence Investment Plan it would commit an additional £8.6 billion in funding to GCAP over a four year period. In July 2026, Leonardo CEO Lorenzo Mariani told reports that the aircraft could enter service two years ahead of its 2035 target date.

In June 2022, Leonardo's US subsidiary, Leonardo DRS, agreed to merge with the Israeli radar and avionics systems company RADA Electronic Industries. Following the merger, Leonardo DRS became publicly listed on both the NASDAQ and the Tel Aviv Stock Exchange, with RADA shareholders receiving a 19.5% stake in the combined business and Leonardo retaining the remainder. Later that year, Leonardo DRS completed the divestment of its Global Enterprise Solutions business and its Advanced Acoustic Concepts joint venture to Thales subsidiary TDSI.

Concurrently, Leonardo S.p.A. finalized the acquisition of a 25.1% stake in the German defense electronics company Hensoldt, matching the shareholding held by the German federal government. On 3 March 2025, Leonardo and the German Rheinmetall group established Leonardo Rheinmetall Military Vehicles (LRMV), a 50-50 joint venture based in Rome. The company was formed to bid for a €23 billion, 15-year contract to renew the Italian Army's ground vehicles, including 280 main battle tanks and 1,000 light infantry fighting vehicles. Under the joint venture agreement, the position of Chairman and CEO rotates alternatively between the two parent companies.

In 2024, Leonardo was granted a patent for technology that could frequencies in the air without decrypting them. This was later used to develop SignalTrace which was meant to be integrated and upgraded into their ELSAG ALPRs, which allowed for a database to be built that correlates bluetooth wearables, certain automotive systems and mobile devices with vehicle data for law enforcement.

In July 2025, Leonardo completed two further acquisitions: cybersecurity firm Axiomatics on 9 July, followed by IDV and Astra on 30 July for €1.7 billion.

Concurrently, negotiations began for the potential sale of the newly acquired Astra division to Rheinmetall as part of the broader LRMV framework.

In July 2026, at the Farnborough International Airshow, newly-appointed Leonardo CEO Lorenzo Mariani said that Leonardo's M-346 would be bidding in the competition to select the replacement for the BAE Systems Hawk as the Royal Air Force's fast jet trainer aircraft. In comments, Mariani said that Leonardo would be seeking additional UK industrial partners to support the bid.

== Organisation ==
Aeronautics

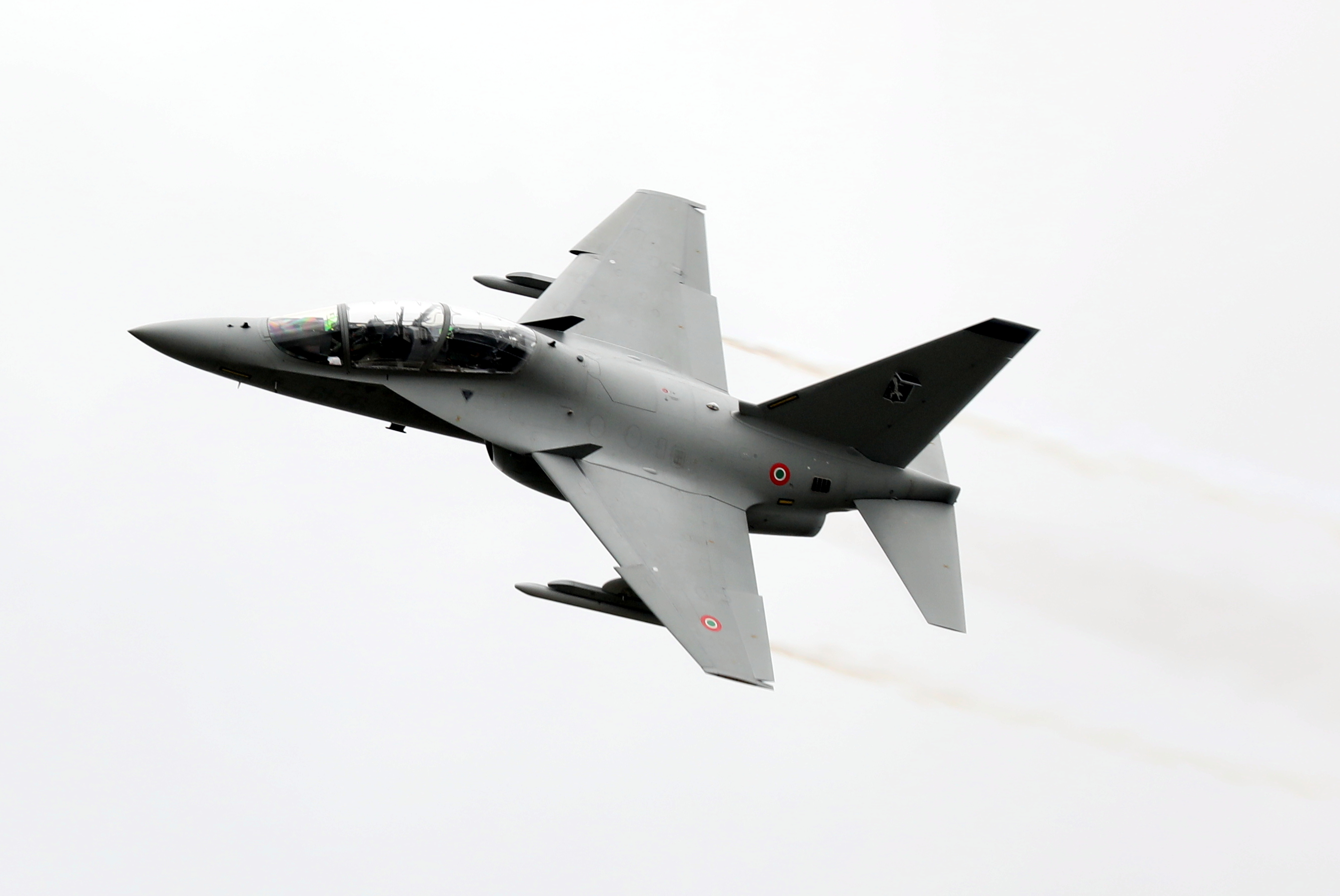
M-346

Leonardo designs, develops, produces, maintains and upgrades commercial, military and military training aircraft, as well as producing aerostructures. The company is part of a network of joint ventures and product partnerships, including such programmes as the Global Combat Air Programme (with BAE Systems and Mitsubishi Heavy Industries) to build a 6th generation fighter, Eurofighter (with BAE Systems and Airbus Group) to build the supersonic multi-role Typhoon, and the ATR (with Airbus Group) to build the family of turboprop regional aircraft of the same name.

Helicopters

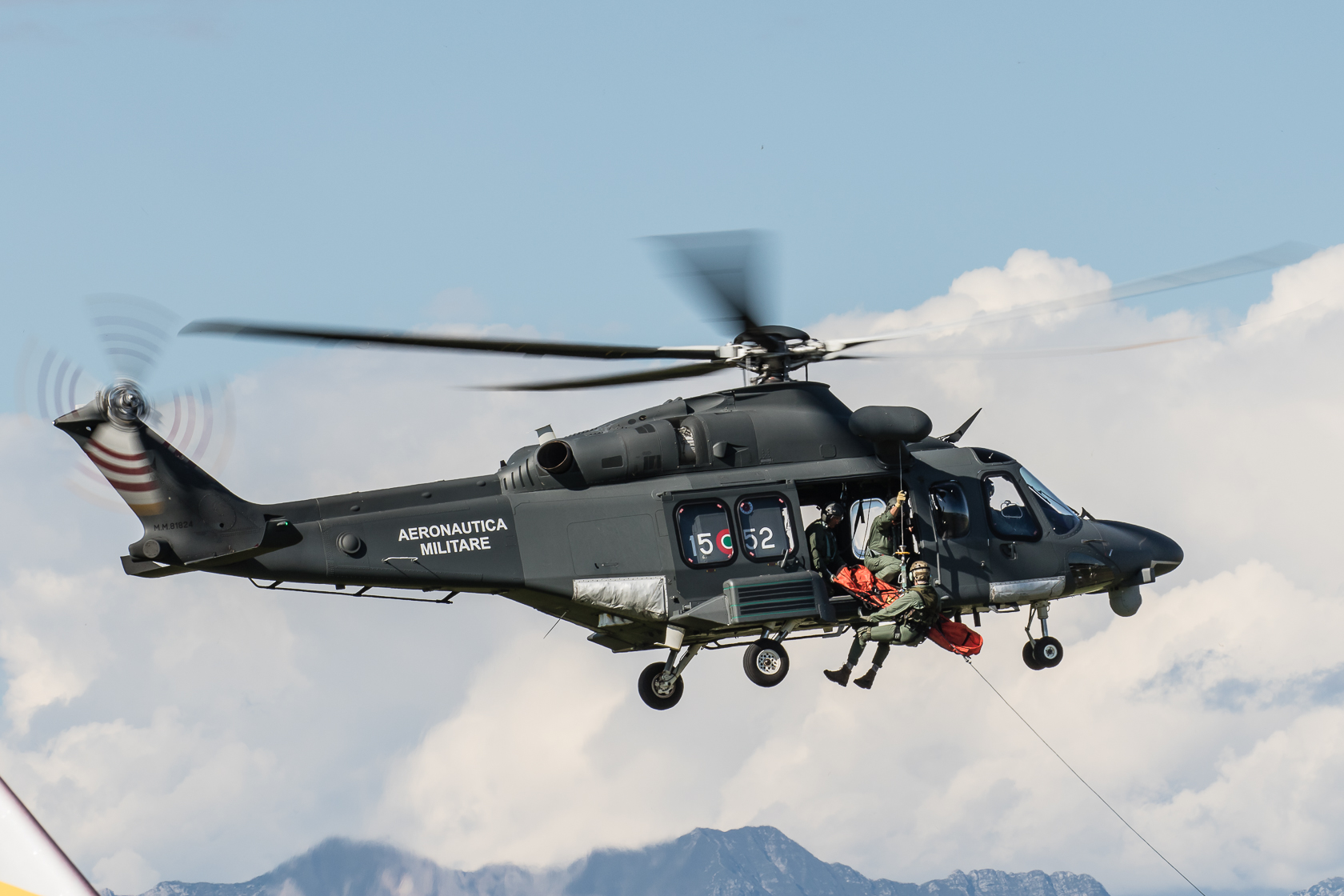
AW139

Leonardo is active in the helicopter market, managing: development to production, pilot training and after sales support. Leonardo produces a range of helicopters for the commercial and defence markets, including all the main weight categories, from 1.8-tonne single-engined to 16-tonne three-engined helicopters.
The company launched its VIP helicopters and travel services under a related new name "Agusta" and unveiled the heliport called "Casa Agusta" at a formal ceremony at the Expo 2020 in Dubai.

Leonardo is developing a helicopter-like autonomous large drone for the Royal Navy named Proteus.

Defence electronics and security

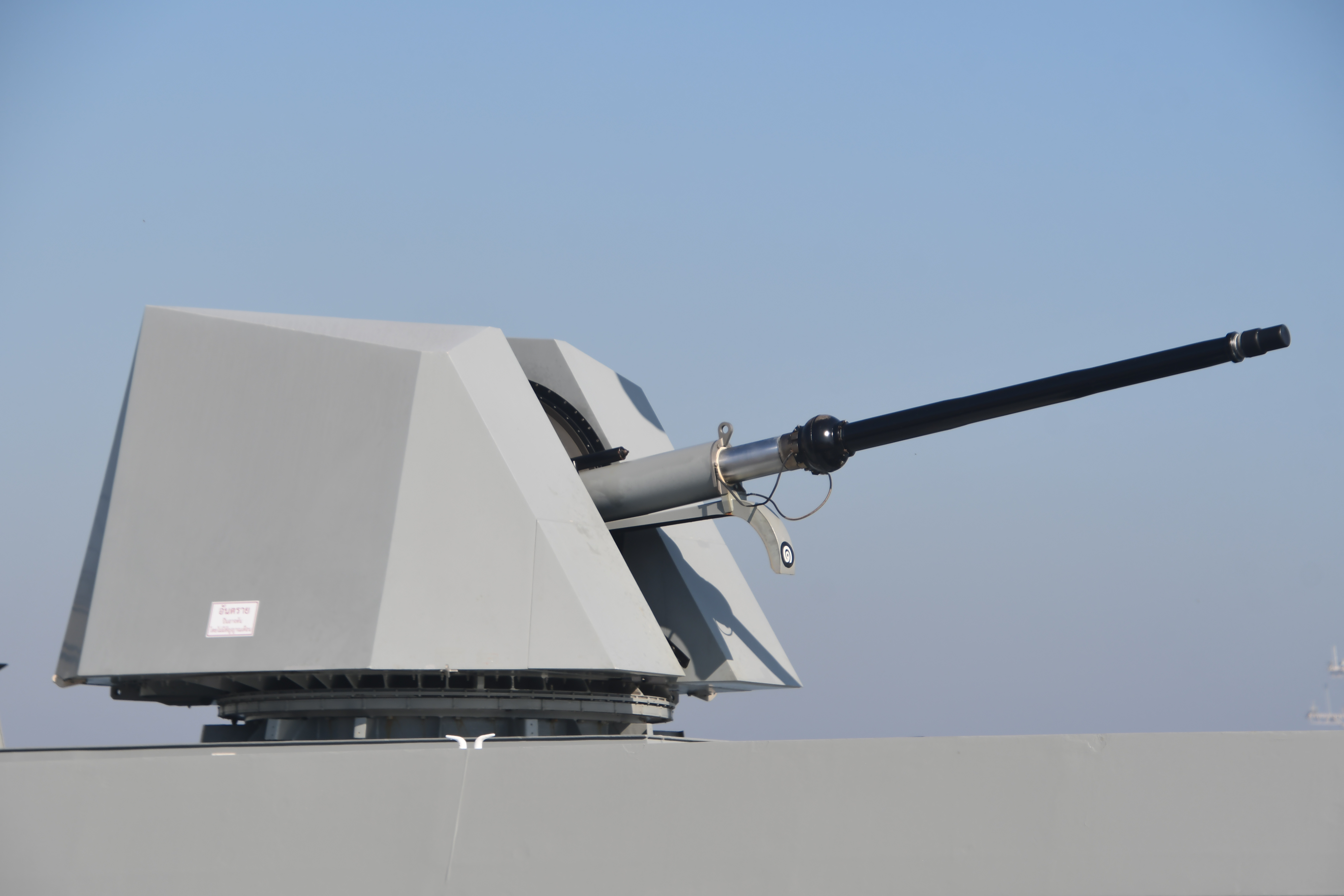
OTO Melara 76 mm Super Rapid

Leonardo develops and integrates systems for the air and sea traffic management and the control and protection of land and sea borders; it also develops secure communications networks for the management of infrastructure and systems. The services include the design and management of IT infrastructure and data processing for intelligence and cyber security. Leonardo is active in the design, development and production of naval artillery, armoured vehicles and underwater systems. In the Defence Electronics & Security sector, Leonardo operates through its US subsidiary DRS Technologies and the joint venture MBDA (37.5% BAE Systems, 37.5% Airbus Group and 25% Leonardo) that produces missiles and missile systems.

Space

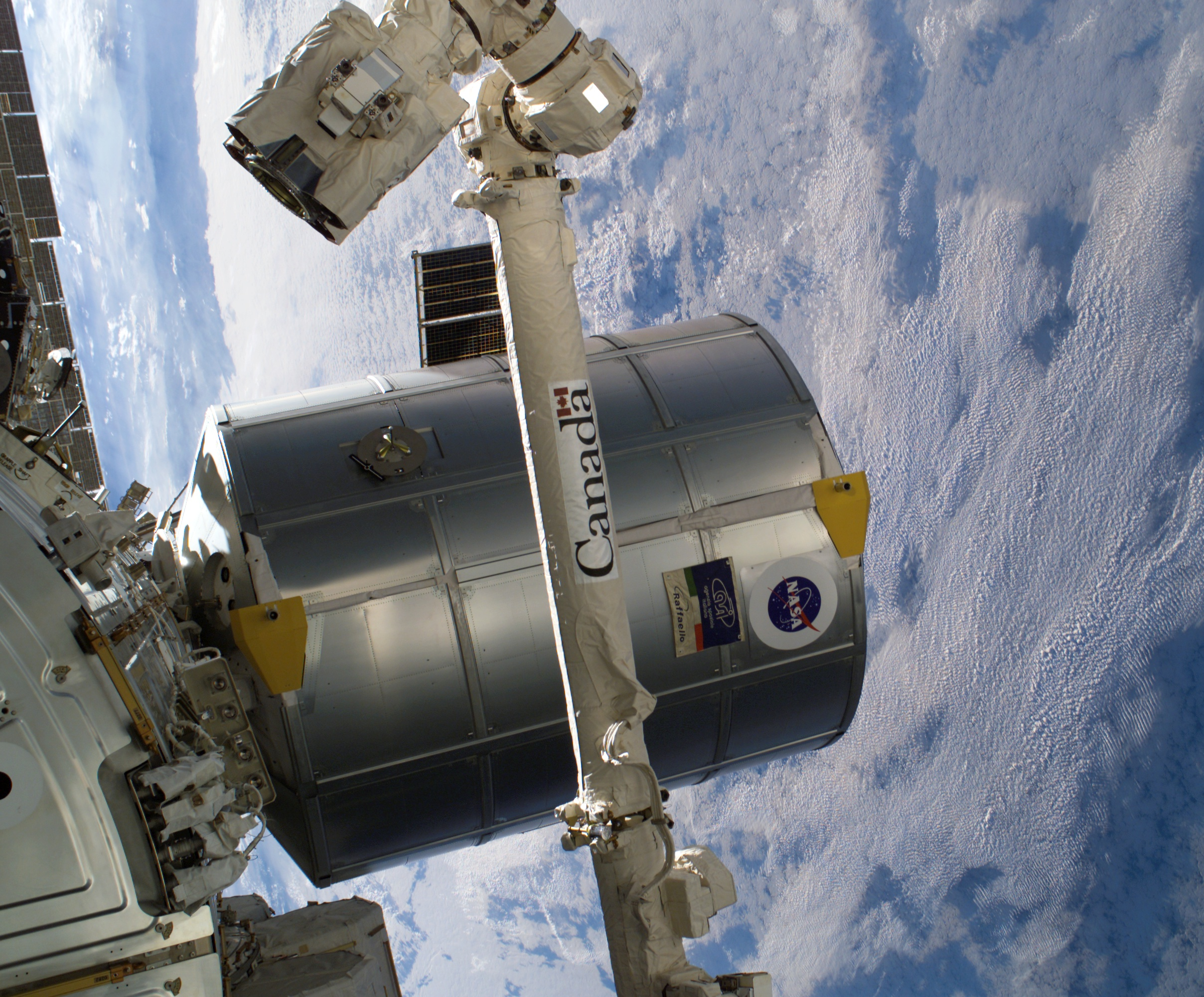
Raffaello MPLM

In the space sector, Leonardo is active mainly through joint ventures Telespazio (Leonardo 67% - Thales 33%) and Thales Alenia Space (Leonardo 33% - Thales 67%). Telespazio offers a wide range of skills and services from design and development of space systems, launch services management and in-orbit satellites to Earth observation services, integrated communications and satellite navigation and localisation. Thales Alenia Space is engaged in the design, integration, testing and implementation of space systems, for navigation, telecommunications, meteorology, environmental control, defence, scientific missions and Earth observation.

=== Areas of business ===
Leonardo is present worldwide in about 20 countries (42% in Italy and 58% abroad). Commercially, there are about 150 countries in the world that use products, systems and services supplied by Leonardo.

Its production activities and its main industrial and commercial bases are located in Italy, the United Kingdom, Poland and the United States. Leonardo has gained a significant presence in France and Germany, and is a partner for various international industrial collaborations. The company is an ITER supplier.

In December 2021, Leonardo Electronics announced it would be building a semiconductor device fabrication facility in Oro Valley, Arizona with construction beginning in the first half of 2022.

Leonardo's ongoing supply of equipment for Israel's military has attracted controversy. In June 2025, Leonardo was identified in a UN expert's report on corporations aiding Israel that "may be embedded in an economy of genocide".

=== Subsidiaries ===
- 100% Leonardo Global Solutions
- 100% Leonardo International
- 100% Leonardo Logistics
- 100% Leonardo UK
- 72.3% Leonardo DRS
- 100% KOPTER Group
- 100% PZL-Świdnik

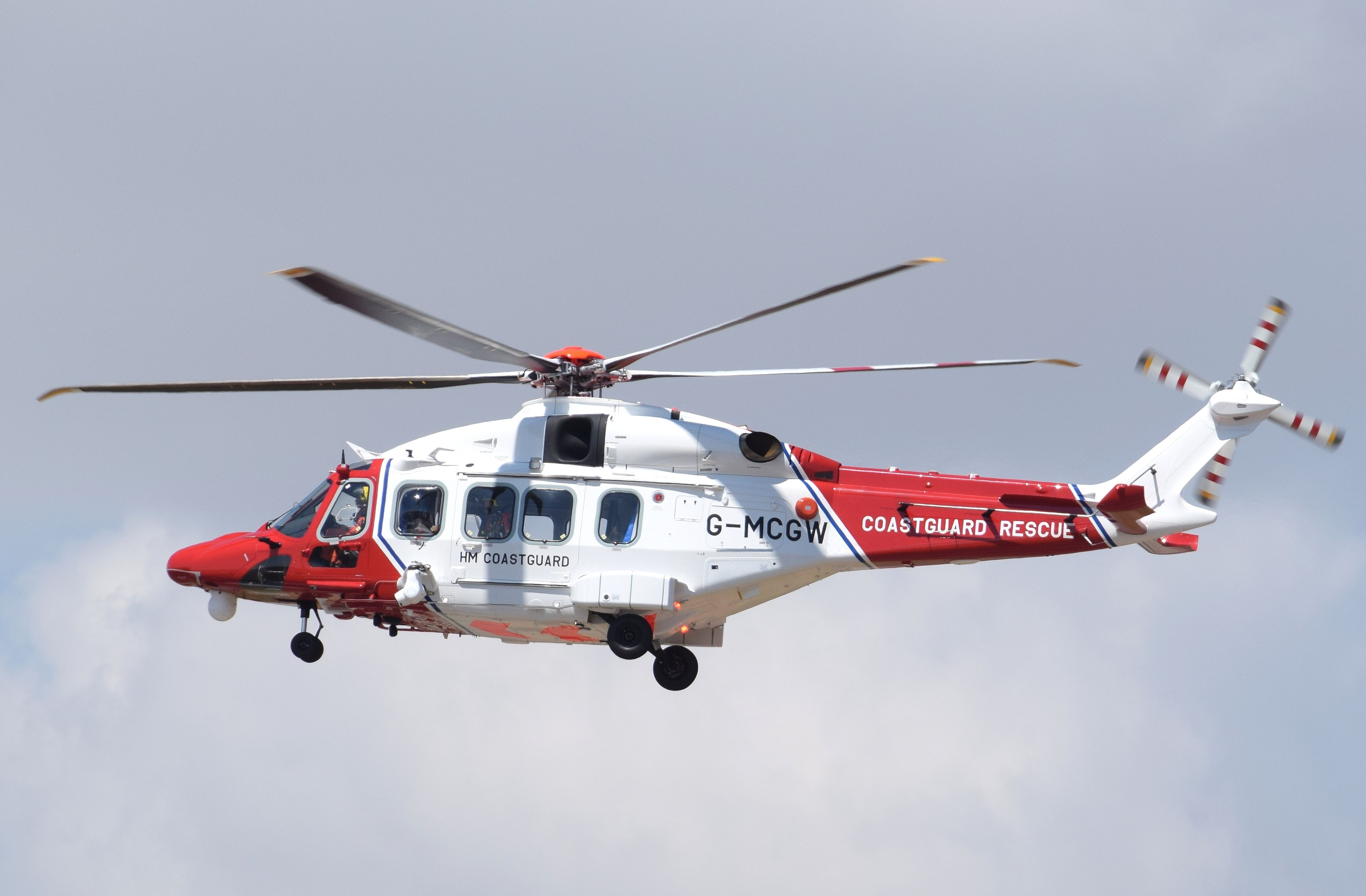
AgustaWestland AW189 helicopter of the UK Coast Guard arrives at the 2018 RIAT, England

=== Joint ventures ===
- 67% Telespazio SpA
- 60% Larimart SpA
- 50% ATR
- 50% Leonardo Rheinmetall Military Vehicles (LRMV)
- 49% Orizzonte Sistemi Navali
- 33% Thales Alenia Space SAS
- 32% NHIndustries
- 31.33% ELT Group
- 30% GEM Elettronica
- 29.63% Avio SpA
- 25% MBDA
- 22.8% Hensoldt
- 21% Eurofighter GmbH

=== Future subsidiaries ===
Acquisition of IDV (Iveco Defence Vehicles) in 2025, for a value of €1.7 billion.

The products of IDV include:

- Heavy vehicles:
  - Ariete C2 (in collaboration with Leonardo)
  - VBM Freccia
  - Centauro 2, an 8×8 fire support vehicle equipped with a Hitfact Mk2 turret with a 105 or 120 mm canon.
  - SuperAV Land, an 8×8 multi-role armoured vehicle.
- Amphibious vehicles:
  - SuperAV, an 8×8 multi-role amphibious armoured vehicle.
  - Guarani, a 6×6 multi-role amphibious armoured vehicle.
- Medium - light vehicles
  - MTV (multirole tactical vehicle), a 6×6 multi-role armoured vehicle.
  - LMV 2 (light multirole vehicle), a 4×4 multi-role armoured vehicle.
  - MUV (military utility vehicle), based on the Iveco Daily 4×4.
- Defence trucks:
  - Modular military range, a family of tactical trucks, armoured and unarmoured, available in 4×4, 6×6, 8×8 and 10×10 configurations.
  - EuroCargo, a civilian vehicle family transformed by IDV.
  - Daily (homeland security / police).
- UGV (uncrewed ground vehicles)
  - Viking

== Shareholder structure ==
As of March 2025, Leonardo's largest shareholder was the Italian Ministry of Economy and Finances with 30.20%.

== Key budget items (2007–2022) ==
	In million of €																	
	2007	2008	2009	2010	2011	2012	2013	2013*	2014	2014**	2015	2016	2017	2018	2019	2020	2021	2022
New Orders	17,916	17,575	21,099	22,453	17,434	15,869	17,571	15,059	15,619	12,667	12,371	19,951	11,595	15,124	14,105	13,754	14,307	17,266
Order backlog	39,304	42,937	45,143	48,668	46,005	44,908	42,697	36,831	38,234	29,383	28,793	34,798	33,578	36,118	36,513	35,516	35,534	37,506
Revenues	13,429	16,504	18,176	18,695	17,318	16,504	16,033	13,690	14,663	12,764	12,995	12,002	11,527	12,240	13,784	13,410	14,135	14,713
Ebita	7.8%	8.7%	8.7%	8.5%	-216	1,006	949	878	1,080	980	1,208	1,252	1,066	1,120	1,251	938	1,123	1,218
Net result before extraordinary transactions	nd	nd	nd	nd	nd	nd	74	(649)	70	15	253	545	274	421	722	241	587	697
Net Result	521	621	718	557	-2.306	-792	74	74	20	20	527	507	274	510	822	243	587	932
Group Net Debt	1,158	3,383	3,070	3,133	3,443	3,382	3,316	3,902	3,962	3,962	3,278	2,845	2,579	2,351	2,847	3,318	3,122	3,016
FOCF	375	469	563	443	-358	91	(307)	(220)	(137)	65	307	706	537	336	241	40	209	539
Employees	60,748	73,398	73,056	75,197	70,474	67,408	63,835	56,282	54,380	54,380	47,156	45,631	45,134	46,462	49,530	49,882	50,413	51,392

- * Restated figures due to the adoption of IFRS 11, which resulted in the dissolution of the joint ventures' group.
- **Restated figures as a result of the reclassification of the transport sector as a discontinued operation.

== Criticisms ==
In 2018, the British NGO Corruption Watch published a report entitled Anglo Italian Job, which analysed million-pound contracts, lobbyists and prominent politicians, bribes, consultancy contracts and private intercessions by the former Finmeccanica group. Within the report, former Member of Parliament, Geoff Hoon, was accused of illegal lobbying. In an email to former South Korean minister Yang Kim, he wrote: "We need you to actively engage in exerting influence over high-ranking decision-makers in Korea."

The Government Pension Fund of Norway, which owned 1.3% of listed shares worldwide in 2018, excluded Leonardo from its investment portfolio because it did not meet its ethical standards.

Leonardo was included in a June 2025 UN report on corporations complicit in the Gaza genocide. Italian economist Clara Mattei wrote in 2026 that from October 2023 to July 2025, their stock price increased by 234 percent.

== See also ==
- Arms industry
- Conglomerate companies of Italy
- Defence companies of Italy
- International Flight Training School
- Leonardo Sistemi di Difesa
