= 444th Bombardment Squadron =

444th Bombardment Squadron (Currently 444th Air Expeditionary Squadron)

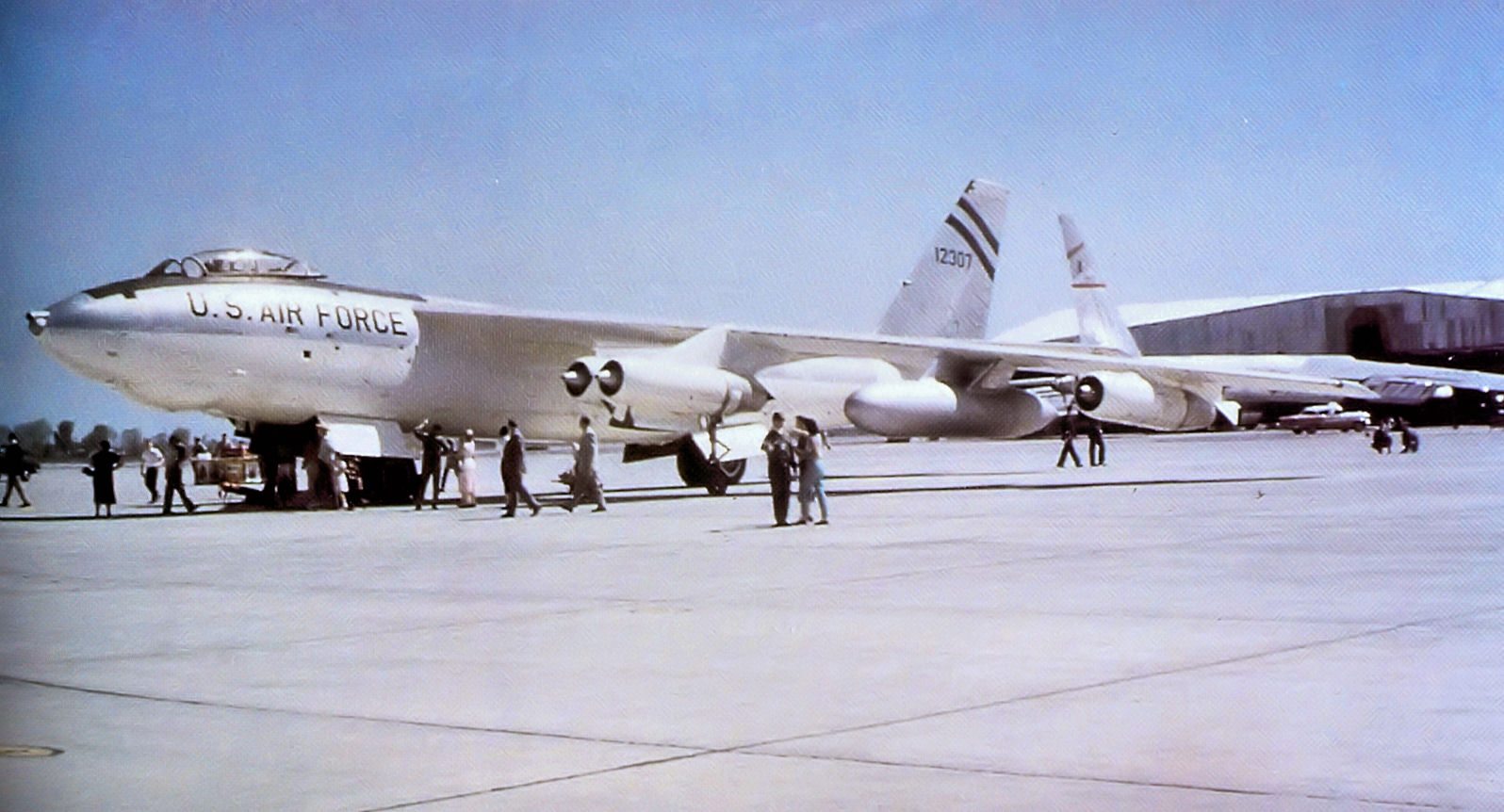
- 320th Bombardment Wing B-47 Stratojet (Note: Aircraft is Boeing B-47B-50-BW Stratojet, serial 51-2307. This aircraft was retired to the Military Aircraft Storage and Disposition Center on 2 September 1960. It is now on display outside Grissom Air Reserve Base, Indiana, but carries the marking of another plane. Baugher, Joe (4 October 2023). "1951 USAF Serial Numbers". Joe Baugher.)
- Active: 1942–1945; 1947–1949; 1958–1960
- Country: United States
- Branch: United States Air Force
- Role: Medium bomber
- Part of: Air Combat Command
- Engagements: Mediterranean Theater of Operations; European Theater of Operations
- Decorations: Distinguished Unit Citation; French Croix de Guerre with Palm

Insignia
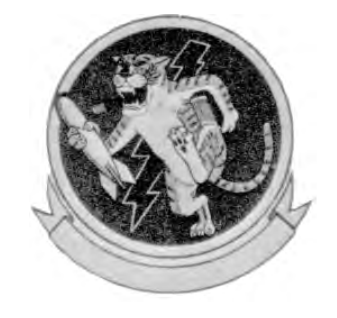
- 444th Bombardment Squadron emblem (Note: Approved 29 January 1960. Description: On an Air Force blue disc bordered white, a red lightning flach bend-sinisterwise edged white, surmounted by a fierce and animated tiger in proper colors, balancing on his right hind foot, his left hind foot raised to strike, his jaws wide apart and menacing, a black cigar trimmed red and white falling from his teeth; grasped in the tiger's right forepaw, a white bomb, shaded silver-gray, clutched tightly under his left foreleg a black book, pages white.)

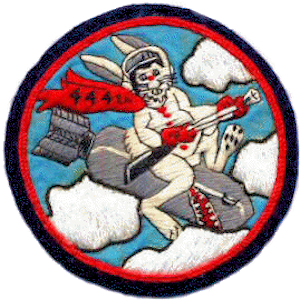
- Patch with 444th Bombardment Squadron emblem (World War II)

The 444th Air Expeditionary Advisory Squadron is a provisional United States Air Force unit. It was last assigned to the 838th Air Expeditionary Advisory Group at Shindand Air Base, Afghanistan, where it trained Afghan Air Force pilots with light aircraft and helicopters.

The squadron was activated during World War II. It participated in combat in the Mediterranean and European Theater of Operations, earning a Distinguished Unit Citation and a French Croix de Guerre with Palm. It remained in Europe after V-E Day, returning to the United States for inactivation in December 1945.

The squadron was briefly active in the reserves from 1947 to 1949, but does not appear to have been fully manned or equipped with operational aircraft. It was activated again in 1959, when Strategic Air Command expanded its Boeing B-47 Stratojet wings from three to four operational squadrons. However, the B-47 was being withdrawn from service and the squadron was inactivated along with its parent wing the following year.

== History ==
=== World War II ===
==== Initial organization and training in the United States ====
The squadron was first established at MacDill Field, Florida on 1 July 1942 as the 444th Bombardment Squadron, one of the four original squadrons of the 320th Bombardment Group, a Martin B-26 Marauder medium bomber group. The squadron trained rapidly in Florida, completing Phase I (individual) Operational Training at MacDill and Phase II (aircrew) Operational Training at Drane Field until beginning to move its aircraft to England in August without starting Phase III (unit) training.

The air echelon departed for Baer Field, Indiana on 19 August with initial plans calling for the squadron's air echelon to move to Europe via the North Atlantic Ferrying Route. At Baer Field, it received B-26s direct from the factory. However, these planes were soon withdrawn and transferred to the 319th Bombardment Group, the first B-26 group to fly its bombers across the Atlantic. (Note: The 319th Bombardment Group suffered several losses on its ferry flight, as winter weather began to impact the northern ferry route and planes were delayed for weather or aircraft malfunctions. As a result, beginning with the 320th Group, further deployments of B-26 units to Europe travelled over the South Atlantic route, Freeman, pp. 15, 55.) The air echelon continued training at Baer Field with the few Marauders it had remaining. After delays continuing to November, it moved to Morrison Field, Florida to begin ferrying its planes using the South Atlantic Ferrying Route.

The ground echelon of the squadron, meanwhile, departed the United States on the RMS Queen Mary on 5 September, arriving at RAF Hethel on 12 September, and moving to RAF Tibenham at the beginning of October. In England, it received additional training from units of Eighth Air Force. It departed for North Africa on 21 November 1942. The air echelon never conducted operations from England, with their Marauders arriving in North Africa between December 1942 and January 1943.

==== Combat in the Mediterranean Theater ====
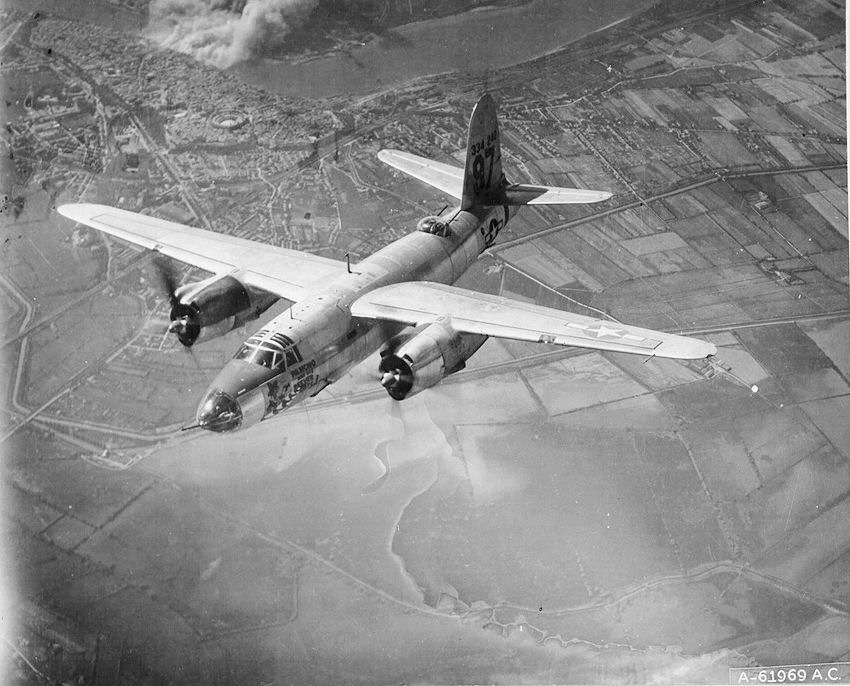
444th Squadron B-26 Marauder after attacking a bridge over the Rhone River near Arles (Note: Aircraft is Martin B-26G-5-MA Marauder, serial 43-34240. This aircraft was hit by German flak and exploded while attacking a roadblock near Covigliano, Italy on 23 August 1944. There were no survivors reported, though three parachutes were reported. Missing Aircrew Report 7997.)

The squadron and its aircraft arrived at its first true overseas station, Oran Es Sénia Airport, Algeria, in early January 1943. The squadron had mine dropping equipment installed on its bomb racks for attacks against enemy submarines. The squadron was withdrawn from antisubmarine combat in February for rest and the antisubmarine mission was transferred to the Royal Air Force. However, it did not fly its first bombing missions until April 1943, by which time it had moved to Montesquieu Airfield, Algeria from its training base at Tafaraoui Airfield, Algeria. Until July 1943, operating from bases in Algeria and Tunisia, it flew missions against enemy shipping on the approaches to Tunis It flew missions against Tunisia and participated in Operation Corkscrew, the projected invasion of Pantelleria. The following month it provided air support for Operation Husky, the invasion of Sicily.

The squadron bombed marshalling yards. bridges airfields, road junctions, viaducts, harbors, fuel and supply dumps, defense positions and other targets in Italy. It supported Operation Avalanche, the landings near Salerno, on the Italian mainland, and knocked out targets to aid the seizure of Naples and to cross the Volturno River. It flew missions against Anzio and Monte Cassino and flew interdiction missions in central Italy in preparation for the Allied approach to Rome.

In November 1943, the squadron moved to Decimomannu Airfield on Sardinia to be better positioned to attack targets in central and northern Italy. Its efforts supporting preparations for and execution of the Allied offensive in central Italy in April through June 1944, including the French breathrough of the Gustav Line, earned the squadron a French Croix de Guerre with Palm. On 12 May 1944, in the face of an intense antiaircraft artillery barrage, it bombed enemy troop concentrations near Fondi supporting United States Fifth Army's advance on Rome, for which it was awarded a Distinguished Unit Citation (DUC). From June to November 1944, it flew interdiction missions in the Po Valley.

==== Combat in northern Europe and inactivation ====
Deployed to North Africa as part of Twelfth Air Force after Operation Torch landings in Algeria in November. Flew tactical bombing missions against Axis Supported Allied ground forces in the Western Allied Invasion of Germany, spring 1945 and becoming part of the United States Air Forces in Europe Army of Occupation in Germany, fall 1945. Personnel demobilized in Germany and the squadron inactivated as a paper unit in December 1945.

=== Service in the reserves ===
The 444th was reactivated as a reserve unit under Air Defense Command (ADC) at Mitchel Field, New York in July 1947 as a light bomber unit. At Mitchel, its training was supervised by the 113th AAF Base Unit (later the 2230th Air Force Reserve Training Center). It does not appear the squadron was fully staffed or equipped with any operational aircraft during this time. In 1948 Continental Air Command assumed responsibility for managing reserve and Air National Guard units from ADC. The 444th was inactivated when Continental Air Command reorganized its reserve units under the wing base organization system in June 1949. The squadron's personnel continuing in paid reserve status and its equipment were transferred to elements of the 84th Fighter Wing.

=== Strategic Air Command ===
From 1958, the Boeing B-47 Stratojet wings of Strategic Air Command (SAC) began to assume an alert posture at their home bases, reducing the amount of time spent on alert at overseas bases. The SAC alert cycle divided itself into four parts: planning, flying, alert and rest to meet General Thomas S. Power’s initial goal of maintaining one third of SAC's planes on fifteen minute ground alert, fully fueled and ready for combat to reduce vulnerability to a Soviet missile strike. To implement this new system, B-47 wings reorganized from three to four squadrons. The 444th was activated at March Air Force Base, California as the fourth squadron of the 320th Bombardment Wing.

However, SAC was relying on the longer range Boeing B-52 Stratofortress, deciding to reduce the number of B-47 wings at March Air Force Base from two to one. With this reduction, the 444th was inactivated on 15 September 1960.

=== Expeditionary operations ===
The squadron was converted to provisional status and redesignated the 444thAir Expeditionary Squadron on 13 May 2011 and assigned to Air Combat Command to activate or inactivate as needed. It does not appear to have been activated since that time.

== Lineage ==
- Constituted as the 444th Bombardment Squadron (Medium) on 19 June 1942

Activated on 1 July 1942
Redesignated 444th Bombardment Squadron, Medium on 9 October 1944
Inactivated on 8 December 1945
Redesignated 444th Bombardment Squadron, Light on 26 May 1947
Activated in the reserve on 9 July 1947
Inactivated on 27 June 1949
Redesignated 444th Bombardment Squadron, Medium on 6 October 1958
Activated on 1 January 1959
Discontinued on 15 September 1960
Converted to provisional status and redesignated 444th Air Expeditionary Squadron on 13 May 2011
Redesignated 444th Air Expeditionary Squadron on 13 May 2011

=== Assignments ===
- 320th Bombardment Group, 1 July 1942 – 4 December 1945
- 320th Bombardment Group, 9 July 1947 – 27 June 1949
- 320th Bombardment Wing, 1 January 1959 – 15 September 1960
- Air Combat Command to activate or inactivate as needed

=== Stations ===
- MacDill Field, Florida, 1 July 1942
- Drane Field, Florida, 8–27 August 1942
- RAF Hethel (AAF-114), England, 4 October 1942
- Oran Es Sénia Airport, Algeria, 8 January 1943
- Tafaraoui Airfield, Algeria, 28 January 1943
- Montesquieu Airfield, Algeria, 14 April 1943
- Massicault Airfield, Tunisia, 29 June 1943
- El Bathan Airfield, Tunisia, 29 July 1943
- Decimomannu Airfield, Sardinia, Italy, c. 9 November 1943
- Alto Airfield, Corsica, France, 19 September 1944
- Dijon-Longvic Airfield (Y-9), France, 11 November 1944
- Dôle-Tavaux Airfield (Y-7), France, 2 April 1945
- Berghof, Germany, 19 June 1945
- AAF Station Herzogenaurach (R-29), 23 September 1945
- Clastres Airfield, France (A-71), c. October-28 November 1945
- Camp Shanks, New York, 5–8 December 1945
- Mitchel Field, New York, 9 July 1947 – 27 June 1949
- March Air Force Base, California, 1 January 1959 – 15 September 1960

=== Aircraft ===
- Martin B-26 Marauder, 1942–1945
- Boeing B-47 Stratojet, 1959–1960

=== Awards and campaigns ===
Award streamer	Award	Dates	Notes
	Distinguished Unit Citation	12 May 1944	Italy, 444th Bombardment Squadron
	Distinguished Unit Citation	15 March 1945	Germany, 444th Bombardment Squadron
	French Croix de Guerre with Palm	April, May, and June 1944	444th Bombardment Squadron

Campaign Streamer	Campaign	Dates	Notes
	Tunisia	9 January 1943 – 13 May 1943	444th Bombardment Squadron
	Antisubmarine, EAME Theater	9 January 1943–April 1943	444th Bombardment Squadron
	Air Combat, EAME Theater	9 January 1943 – 11 May 1945	444th Bombardment Squadron
	Sicily	14 May 1943 – 17 August 1943	444th Bombardment Squadron
	Naples-Foggia	18 August 1943 – 21 January 1944	444th Bombardment Squadron
	Anzio	22 January 1944 – 24 May 1944	444th Bombardment Squadron
	Rome-Arno	22 January 1944 – 9 September 1944	444th Bombardment Squadron
	Southern France	15 August 1944 – 14 September 1944	444th Bombardment Squadron
	North Apennines	10 September 1944 – 11 November 1944	444th Bombardment Squadron
	Northern France	25 July 1944 – 14 September 1944	444th Bombardment Squadron
	Rhineland	11 November 1944 – 21 March 1945	444th Bombardment Squadron
	Central Europe	22 March 1944 – 21 May 1945	444th Bombardment Squadron

== See also ==
- List of Martin B-26 Marauder operators
- List of B-47 units of the United States Air Force
