= 441st Bombardment Squadron =

441st Bombardment Squadron (Currently 441st Air Expeditionary Squadron)

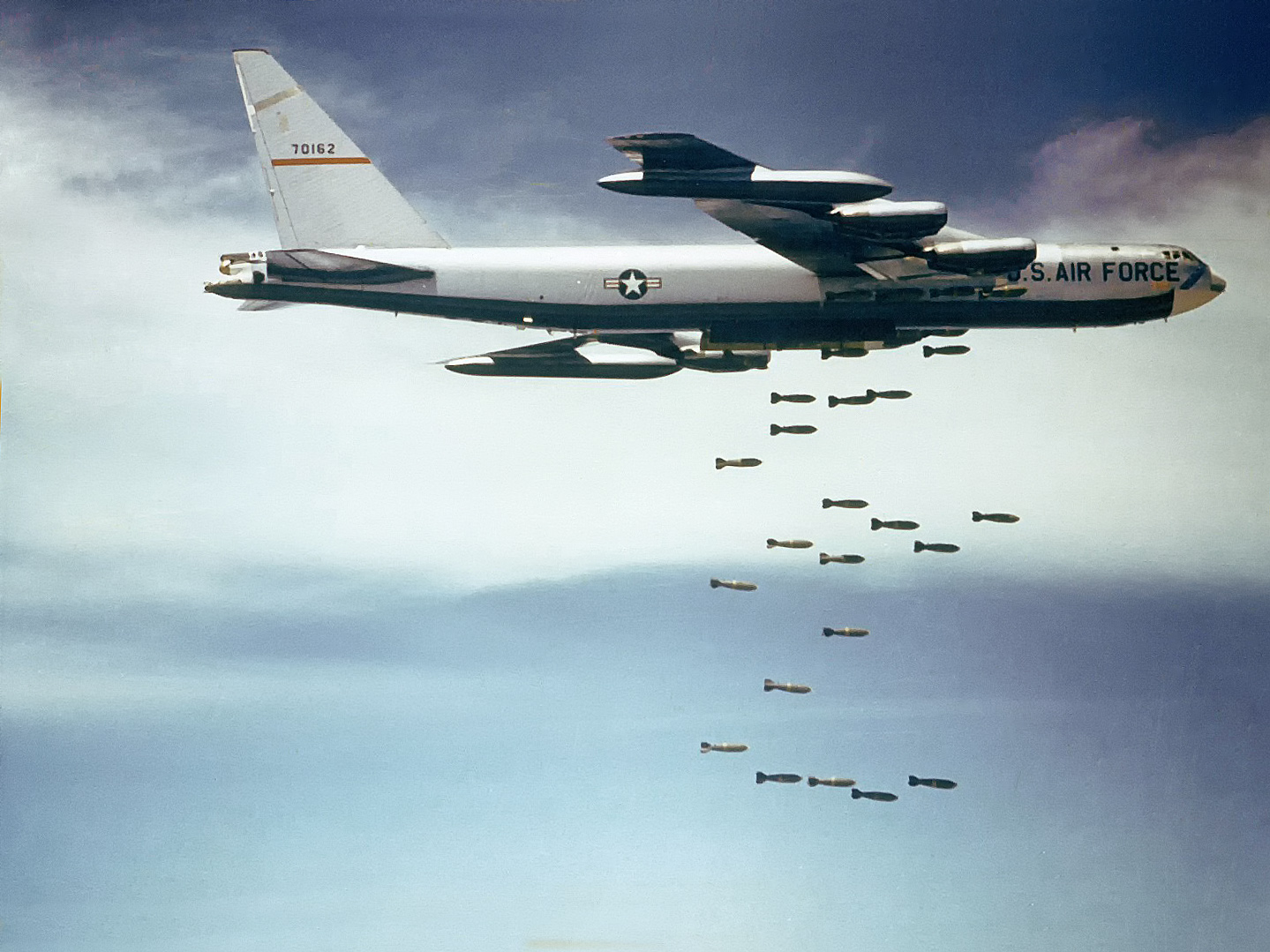
- Squadron Boeing B-52 dropping bombs in Vietnam (Note: Aircraft is Boeing B-52F-70-BW Stratofortress serial 57-0162, nicknamed Casper The Friendly Ghost. This aircraft was the first B-52F used to test conventional bombing in 1964, and later dropped the 50,000th bomb of the Arc Light campaign. B-52Fs could carry 51 bombs and served in Vietnam from June 1965 to April 1966 when they were replaced by "Big Belly" B-52Ds which could carry 108 bombs.)
- Active: 1942–1945; 1947–1949; 1952–1960; 1963–1989; c. 2015 – c. 2018
- Country: United States
- Branch: United States Air Force
- Role: Expeditionary support
- Part of: Air Combat Command
- Motto: Finis Origine Pendet (Latin for 'The End Depends on the Beginning')
- Engagements: Mediterranean Theater of Operations; European Theater of Operations
- Decorations: Distinguished Unit Citation; Air Force Meritorious Unit Award; Air Force Outstanding Unit Award; French Croix de Guerre with Palm

Insignia
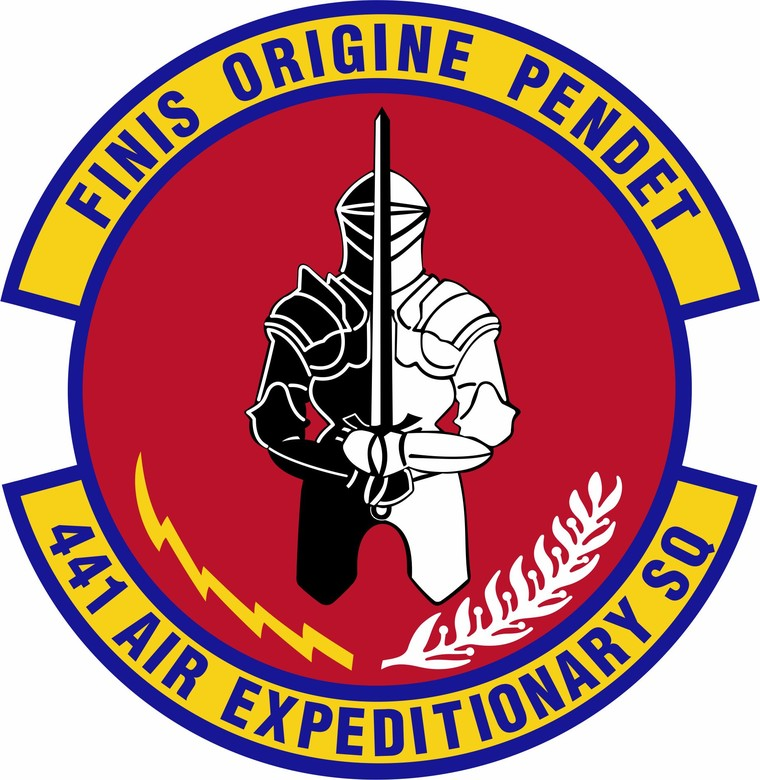
- 441st Air Expeditionary Squadron emblem (Note: Approved 23 January 2018.)

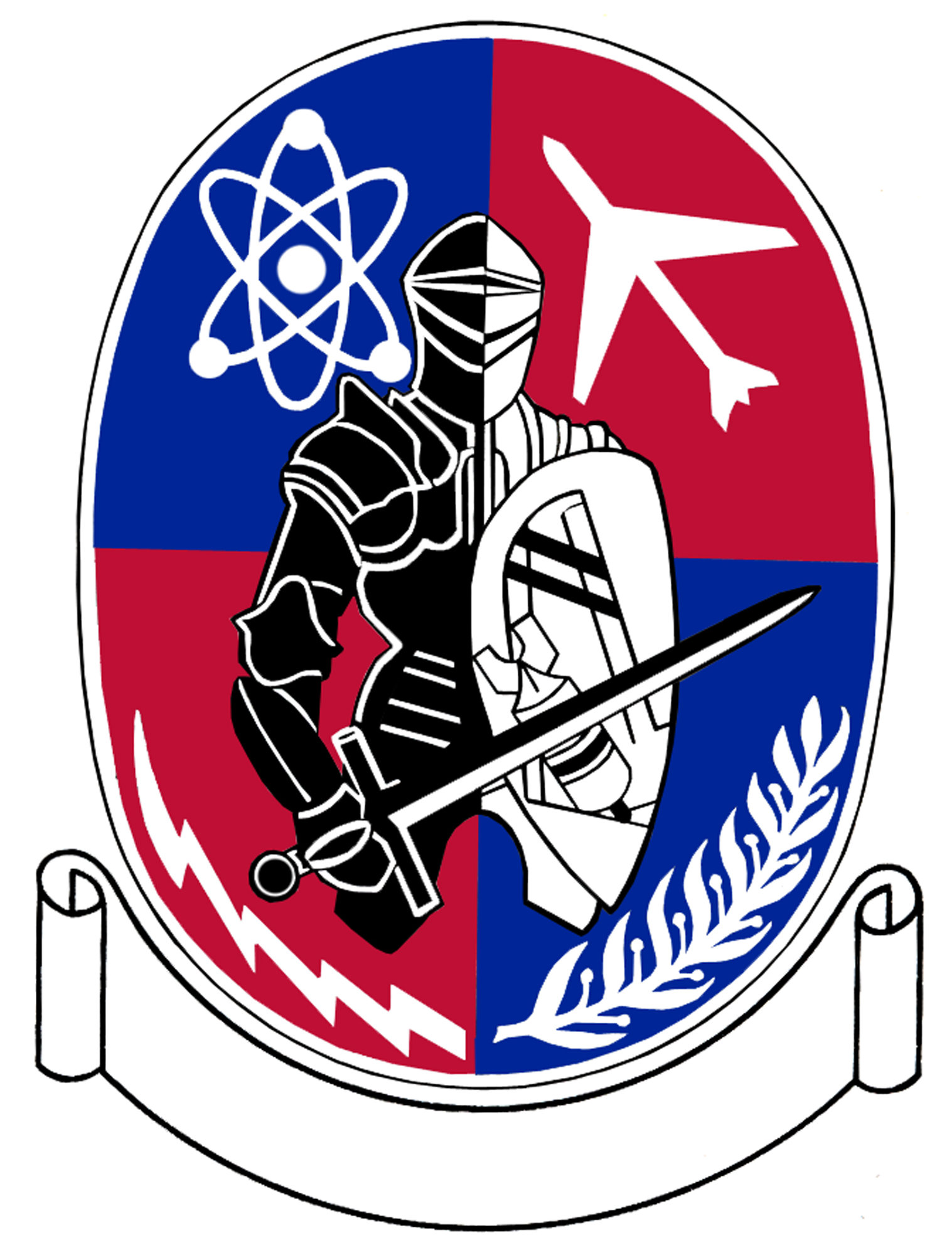
- 441st Bombardment Squadron emblem (Note: Approved 3 June 1964.)

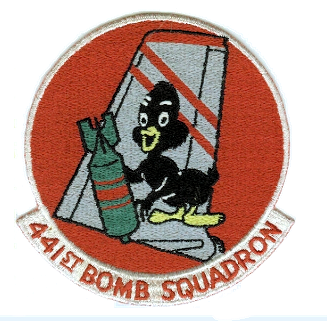
- 441st Bombardment Squadron emblem (Note: Approved 7 April 1954. Description: on a red disc with a white border, a gray aircraft tail with deep red markings supporting a caricatured black duck with yellow bill and feet holding with his right wing a green bomb pointing to base with deep red bands, all outlined with black.)

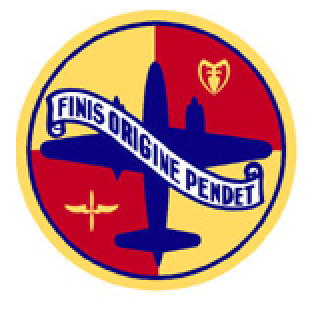
- 441st Bombardment Squadron emblem (Note: Used from 1944 to 1945.)

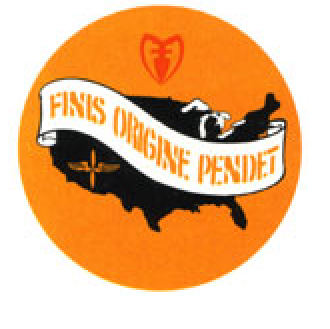
- 441st Bombardment Squadron emblem (Note: Used from 1943 to 1944.)

The 441st Air Expeditionary Squadron is a provisional United States Air Force unit. It was converted to provisional status in May 2011. Its last assignment as a regular unit was to the 320th Bombardment Wing at Mather Air Force Base, California, where it was inactivated on 30 September 1989. It has been active since, operating a small air base in Syria.

The squadron was first activated during World War II as the 441st Bombardment Squadron. It served in combat in the Mediterranean Theater of Operations, where it earned the Distinguished Unit Citation (DUC) and the French Croix de Guerre with Palm for combat operations in Italy. In 1944, it moved north into the European Theater of Operations, where it earned a second DUC. After V-E Day, the squadron remained in Germany to participate in the disarmament of the Luftwaffe, then returned to the United States for inactivation.

Although briefly active in the reserve from 1947-1949, the squadron was primarily a Strategic Air Command bomber unit, first with Boeing B-47 Stratojets, then with Boeing B-52 Stratofortresses, serving on nuclear alert with both types of bombers. Although it did not serve as a unit, the squadron was one of the first to deploy aircraft and aircrew for Operation Arc Light missions in Vietnam. It again deployed most of its planes and crews in 1972 to participate in Operation Linebacker II. The squadron was inactivated in 1989, in connection with the reduction of strategic forces and the recommended closure of Mather.

== History ==
=== World War II ===
==== Initial organization and training in the United States ====
The squadron was first established at MacDill Field, Florida on 1 July 1942 as the 441st Bombardment Squadron, one of the four original squadrons of the 320th Bombardment Group, a Martin B-26 Marauder medium bomber group. The squadron trained rapidly in Florida, completing Phase I (individual) Operational Training at MacDill and Phase II (aircrew) Operational Training at Drane Field until beginning to move its aircraft to England in August without starting Phase III (unit) training.l

The air echelon departed for Baer Field, Indiana on 19 August with initial plans calling for the squadron's air echelon to move to Europe via the North Atlantic Ferrying Route. At Baer Field, it received B-26s direct from the factory. However, these planes were soon withdrawn and transferred to the 319th Bombardment Group, the first B-26 group to fly its bombers across the Atlantic. (Note: The 319th Bombardment Group suffered several losses on its ferry flight, as winter weather began to impact the northern ferry route and planes were delayed for weather or aircraft malfunctions. As a result, beginning with the 320th Group, further deployments of B-26 units to Europe travelled over the South Atlantic route, Freeman, pp. 15, 55.) The air echelon continued training at Baer Field with the few Marauders it had remaining. After delays continuing to November, it moved to Morrison Field, Florida to begin ferrying its planes using the South Atlantic Ferrying Route.

The ground echelon of the squadron, meanwhile, departed the United States on the RMS Queen Mary on 5 September, arriving at RAF Hethel on 12 September, and moving to RAF Tibenham at the beginning of October. In England, it received additional training from units of Eighth Air Force. It departed for North Africa on 21 November 1942. The air echelon never conducted operations from England, with their Marauders arriving in North Africa between December 1942 and January 1943.

==== Combat in the Mediterranean Theater ====
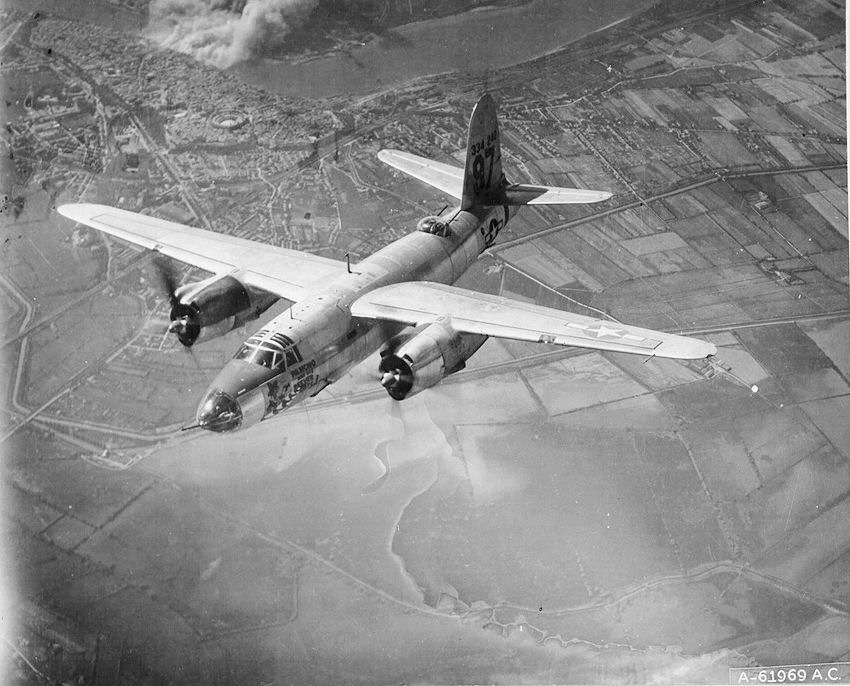
320th Group B-26 Marauder after attacking a bridge over the Rhone River near Arles (Note: Aircraft is Martin B-26G-5-MA Marauder, serial 43-34240. This aircraft was hit by German flak and exploded while attacking a roadblock near Covigliano, Italy on 23 August 1944. There were no survivors reported, though three parachutes were reported. Missing Aircrew Report 7997.)

The squadron and its aircraft arrived at its first true overseas station, Oran Es Sénia Airport, Algeria, in early January 1943. The squadron had mine dropping equipment installed on its bomb racks for attacks against enemy submarines. The squadron was withdrawn from antisubmarine combat in February for rest and the antisubmarine mission was transferred to the Royal Air Force. However, it did not fly its first bombing missions until April 1943, by which time it had moved to Montesquieu Airfield, Algeria from its training base at Tafaraoui Airfield, Algeria. Until July 1943, operating from bases in Algeria and Tunisia, it flew missions against enemy shipping on the approaches to Tunis It flew missions against Tunisia and participated in Operation Corkscrew, the projected invasion of Pantelleria. The following month it provided air support for Operation Husky, the invasion of Sicily.

The squadron bombed marshalling yards. bridges airfields, road junctions, viaducts, harbors, fuel and supply dumps, defense positions and other targets in Italy. It supported Operation Avalanche, the landings near Salerno, on the Italian mainland, and knocked out targets to aid the seizure of Naples and to cross the Volturno River. It flew missions against Anzio and Monte Cassino and flew interdiction missions in central Italy in preparation for the Allied approach to Rome.

In November 1943, the squadron moved to Decimomannu Airfield on Sardinia to be better positioned to attack targets in central and northern Italy. Its efforts supporting preparations for and execution of the Allied offensive in central Italy in April through June 1944, including the French breathrough of the Gustav Line, earned the squadron a French Croix de Guerre with Palm. On 12 May 1944, in the face of an intense antiaircraft artillery barrage, it bombed enemy troop concentrations near Fondi supporting United States Fifth Army's advance on Rome, for which it was awarded a Distinguished Unit Citation (DUC). From June to November 1944, it flew interdiction missions in the Po Valley.

==== Combat in northern Europe and inactivation ====
After the Allies carried out Operation Dragoon, the invasion of southern France, in August 1944, the squadron flew air support missions there, moving to Dijon-Longvic Airfield, France in November. It bombed bridges, railroads, gun positions, barracks, supply and munitions dumps and other targets in France and Germany until V-E Day. Near the end of the war, on 15 March 1945, the squadron bombed pillboxes, weapons pits, trenches and roads within the Siegfried Line to enable the breakthrough of the United States Seventh Army, for which it was awarded a second DUC.

Following the end of the war, the squadron moved to Pfreimd, where it took part in Operation Eclipse, the air disarmament campaign, acting as teams to disband the Luftwaffe, and packing its most advanced equipment for shipment back to the US, until the fall, when it moved to France to prepare for return to the US. It departed Europe in November 1945 and was inactivated on its arrival at the Port of Embarkation in December.

=== Service in the reserves ===
The 441st was reactivated as a reserve unit under Air Defense Command (ADC) at Mitchel Field, New York in July 1947 as a light bomber unit. At Mitchel, its training was supervised by the 113th AAF Base Unit (later the 2230th Air Force Reserve Training Center). It does not appear the squadron was fully staffed or equipped with any operational aircraft. In 1948 Continental Air Command assumed responsibility for managing reserve and Air National Guard units from ADC. The 441st was inactivated when Continental Air Command reorganized its reserve units under the wing base organization system in June 1949. The squadron's personnel continuing paid reserve status and its equipment were transferred to elements of the 84th Fighter Wing.

=== Strategic Air Command operations ===
==== Medium bomber operations ====
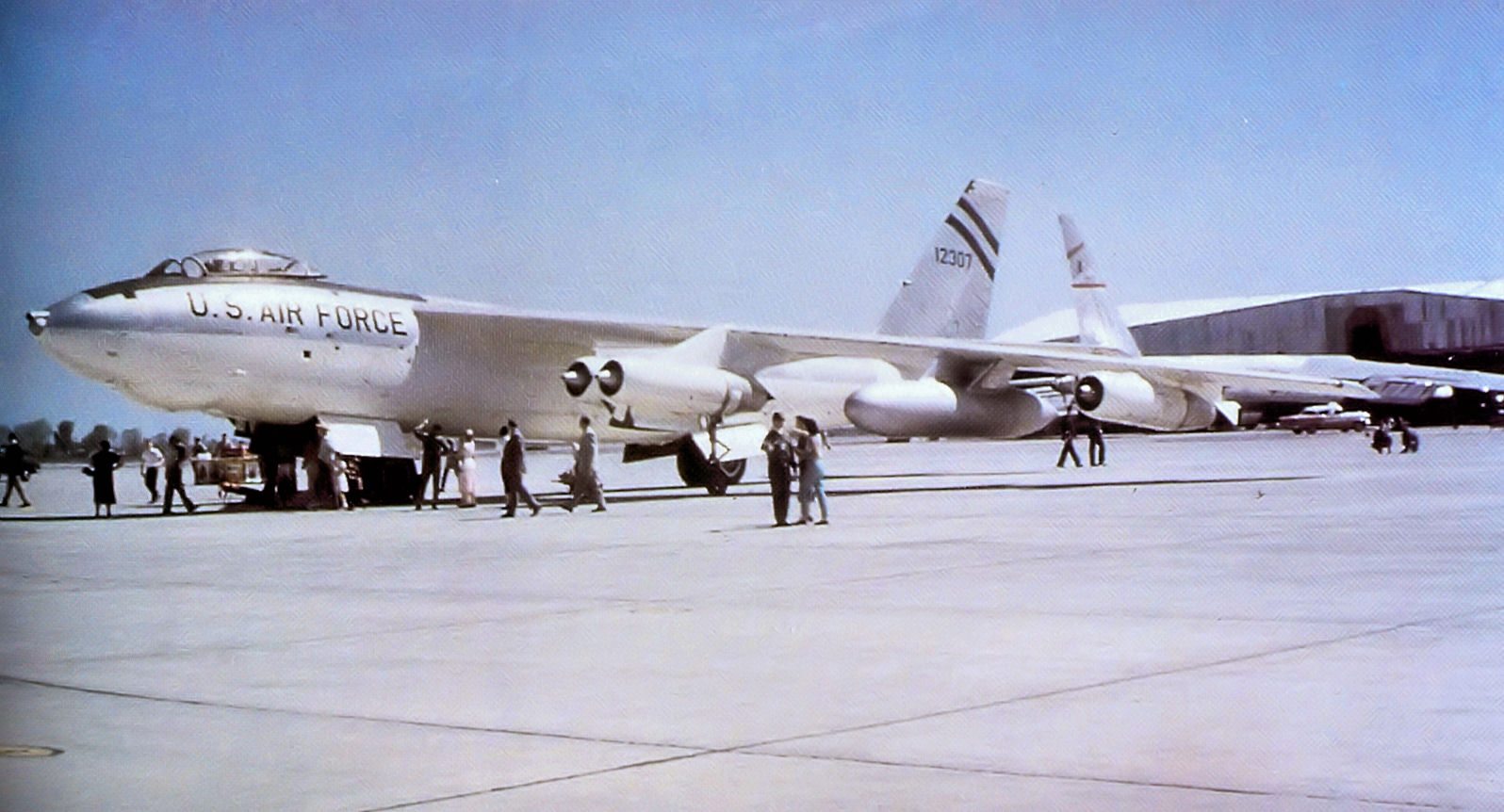
320th Wing B-47B Stratojet (Note: Aircraft is Boeing B-47B-50-BW Stratojet, serial 51-2307. Note the two diagonal tail stripes duplicated on the squadron insigne of the time. This aircraft was retired to the Military Aircraft Storage and Disposition Center on 2 September 1960. It is now on display outside Grissom Air Force Base, Indiana, but carries the marking of another plane. Baugher, Joe (4 October 2023). "1951 USAF Serial Numbers". Joe Baugher.)

During the Korean War, the 106th Bombardment Wing, a New York Air National Guard unit, was mobilized and assigned to Strategic Air Command (SAC) and trained as a Boeing B-29 Superfortress wing. On 1 December 1952, the 106th Wing was returned to state control and replaced by the 320th Bombardment Wing. In connection with this change, the 441st was reactivated, and took over the personnel and Superfortresses of the 102d Bombardment Squadron, which was simultaneously relieved from active duty. Under SAC's new organization, the squadron reported directly to the new wing, and the 320th Group remained inactive. (Note: Although the 320th Wing was a new organization, it later continued, through temporary bestowal, the history, and honors of the 320th Bombardment Group. This temporary bestowal ended in January 1984, when the wing and group were consolidated into a single unit.)

In early 1953, the squadron began to replace its B-29s with Boeing B-47B Stratojets. For a while the service test model of the reconnaissance version of this new jet bomber, the YRB-47, was on the squadron's strength. In December, the squadron began training the cadre of B-47 aircrews for the 96th Bombardment Wing, which had been activated at Altus Air Force Base with only minimum manning as that station was being reopened. This training continued for a little more than a year.

In June 1954, the squadron, along with the entire 320th Wing, deployed as a unit to RAF Brize Norton remaining there until September. It repeated this performance at Andersen Air Force Base, Guam between September 1956 and January 1957. Later in 1957, overseas alert operations changed in character when overseas alert began to be supported by multiple wings, with individuals rotating home during an extended overseas Operation Reflex alert, rather than deploying an entire wing overseas as a unit. Reflex placed Stratojets and Boeing KC-97 Stratofreighters at bases closer to the Soviet Union.

The percentage of SAC planes on alert gradually grew over the next three years to reach its goal of 1/3 of SAC's force on alert by 1960. From 1958, SAC's B-47 Stratojet squadrons began to assume an alert posture at their home bases, reducing the amount of time spent on alert at overseas bases. This was designed to meet General Thomas S. Power's initial goal of maintaining one third of SAC's planes on fifteen minute ground alert, fully fueled and ready for combat to reduce vulnerability to a Soviet missile strike.

However, SAC was relying on the longer range Boeing B-52 Stratofortress, deciding to reduce the number of B-47 wings at March Air Force Base from two to one. With this reduction, the 441st was inactivated on 15 September 1960.

==== Heavy bomber operations ====
SAC bases with large concentrations of bombers made attractive targets. SAC's response was to break up its B-52 wings and scatter their aircraft over a larger number of bases. This made it more difficult for the Soviet Union to knock our the entire heavy bomber fleet with a surprise first strike. As part of this program, SAC moved the 72nd Bombardment Squadron to Mather Air Force Base, California, an Air Training Command station, and organized the 4134th Strategic Wing as its headquarters.

However, the 4134th Wing was a Major Command controlled (MAJCON) wing. MAJCON units could not carry a permanent history or lineage. In 1963, SAC received authority from Headquarters USAF to discontinue its MAJCON strategic wings that were equipped with combat aircraft and to activate Air Force controlled (AFCON) units, most of which were inactive at the time which could carry a lineage and history. On 1 February 1963, the 441st Bombardment Squadron was reactivated and assumed the B-52Fs, personnel and equipment of the 72nd Bombardment Squadron as the 320th Bombardment Wing replaced the discontinued 4134th Wing.

A combat ready unit on activation, the squadron trained for global strategic bombing operations. SAC's alert commitment had increased to maintaining one half of the squadron's bombers on nuclear alert. Additionally, the squadron was periodically tasked under Operation Chrome Dome to maintain two armed aircraft airborne for "airborne alert training."

The squadron's commitment to SAC's nuclear deterrent mission changed in February 1965. Having received training on "iron bombs" since 1964, and having their B-52Fs modified to carry additional bombs on external racks, the squadron was launched to Anderson Air Force Base, Guam in February 1965, where it was joined by B-52Fs the 736th Bombardment Squadron from Columbus Air Force Base, Mississippi and the 9th Bombardment Squadron from Carswell Air Force Base, Texas. However, the first mission of what would become Operation Arc Light did not take place until 18 June, when squadron bombers and bombers from the 9th Squadron attacked Viet Cong bases near the Cambodian border with the Republic of Viet Nam. Due to a timing error, one cell of B-52s orbited to lose time, causing two cells to run together. A squadron plane and one from the 9th squadron crashed as a result, with all aboard lost. The squadron remained on Guam until July 1965.

General William C. Westmoreland, commander of U.S. forces in South Vietnam, was convinced the B-52 could play an effective role, and he called for more bombing missions. From June through the end of 1965 squadron and other deployed B-52Fs completed over 100 missions to South Vietnam. These B-52s were used primarily in saturation bombing of Viet Cong base areas, but later they were also used in direct tactical support of the Marine Corps’ Operation Harvest Moon and the 1st Cavalry Division's fight in the Ia Drang Valley.

The squadron returned to Andersen in December 1965. By this time, most B-52 missions were carried out under Combat Skyspot, in which bombing was directed by ground radar stations, rather than being conducted using the B-52 bombardment/navigation system. In February 1966, SAC bomber operations were brought together under the Bombardment Wing, Provisional, 4133d The squadron's second tour in Southeast Asia ended in March 1966. By this time the B-52Fs, which had been carrying out the majority of the B-52 deployments to Guam, were replaced by B-52Ds, which had been modified to carry almost twice as many conventional bombs in Project Big Belly. By late June 1966, after one year of participation in the war, the B-52s were dropping approximately 8,000 tons of bombs each month. Missions were flown in all types of weather, night and day. In 1966, over 5,000 B-52 sorties were flown to support operations against the enemy.

With the assumption of the Arc Light mission by B-52D units, the squadron resumed alert and strategic training duties, while maintaining a conventional bombing capability. In 1968, it equipped with newer B-52G model aircraft.. The following year, it began rotating aircrews and aircraft to support operations in Southeast Asia, and in June 1972, once again deployed nearly all its personnel and equipment to support other units there. These deployed elements participated in Operation Linebacker II.

Following the Paris Peace Accords, the squadron reformed at Mather in October 1973. After it returned, it maintained conventional bombing capabilities until September 1989, when it was inactivated as B-52Gs were being withdrawn from service and Mather was recommended for closure by the Carlucci Commission.

=== Expeditionary unit ===
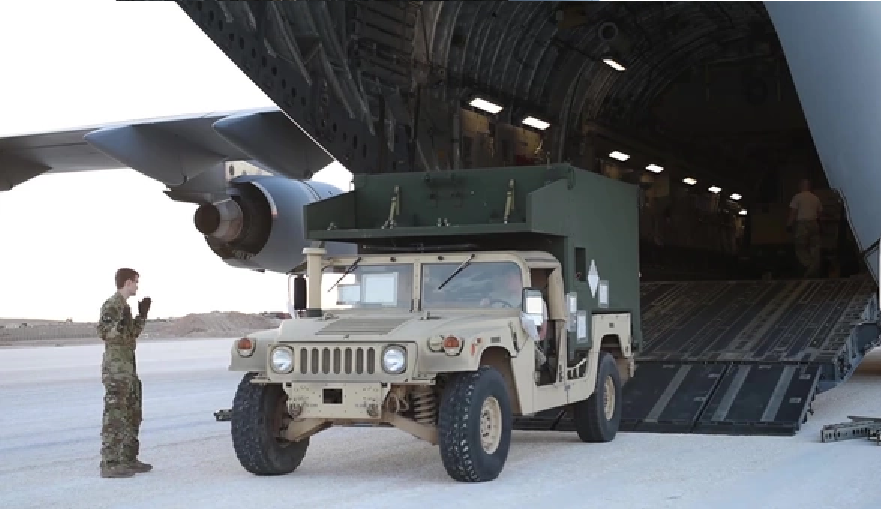
441st Air Expeditionary Squadron Aerial Port Operations

In 2011 the squadron was converted to provisional status as the 441st Air Expeditionary Squadron and assigned to Air Combat Command to activate as needed.

Squadron expeditionary operations appear to be classified, although the Department of Defense released a video of the squadron at an Operation Inherent Resolve "undisclosed location" with a dirt runway supporting Lockheed C-130 Hercules and Boeing C-17 Globemaster III operations. The United States Central Command released a photograph of an airman assigned to the squadron handing out clothing near the Kobani Landing Zone (LZ), although it did not say he was stationed at Kobani. The Kobani LZ was constructed near the village of Sarrin, with a 2,000 meters (6,600 ft) runway.

In 2018, it was reported by non-military sources that the squadron was operating in Sarrin, in the western portion of Raqqa Governorate, Syria to support Operation Inherent Resolve.

US forces withdrew from northern Syria in 2019. Russian troops reportedly occupied the evacuated bases. About 500 U.S. troops remained to guard energy facilities in eastern Syria.

== Lineage ==
- Constituted as the 441st Bombardment Squadron (Medium) on 19 June 1942

Activated on 1 July 1942
Redesignated 441st Bombardment Squadron, Medium on 9 October 1944
Inactivated on 6 December 1945
Redesignated 441st Bombardment Squadron, Light on 26 May 1947
Activated in the reserve on 9 July 1947
Inactivated on 27 June 1949
Redesignated 441st Bombardment Squadron, Medium and activated on 1 December 1952
Discontinued on 15 September 1960
Redesignated 441st Bombardment Squadron, Heavy on 15 November 1962 (not organized)
Organized on 1 February 1963
Inactivated on 30 September 1989
Redesignated 441st Air Expeditionary Squadron and converted to provisional status on 13 May 2011
: Activated c. 15 June 2018
: Inactivated c. 5 May 2020

=== Assignments ===
- 320th Bombardment Group, 1 July 1942 – 4 December 1945
- 320th Bombardment Group, 9 July 1947 – 27 June 1949
- 320th Bombardment Wing, 1 December 1952 – 15 September 1960
- Strategic Air Command, 15 November 1962 (not organized)
- 320th Bombardment Wing, 1 February 1963 – 30 September 1989
- Air Combat Command to activate or inactivate as needed at any time after 13 May 2011

- 379th Air Expeditionary Wing c. 15 June 2018 – c. 5 May 2020

=== Stations ===
- MacDill Field, Florida, 1 July 1942
- Drane Field, Florida, 8–28 August 1942
- RAF Hethel (AAF-114), England, 12 September 1942
- RAF Tibenham (AAF-124), England, 1 October 1942
- Oran Es Sénia Airport, Algeria, 9 January 1943
- Tafaraoui Airfield, Algeria, 28 January 1943
- Montesquieu Airfield, Algeria, 14 April 1943
- Massicault Airfield, Tunisia, 29 June 1943
- El Bathan Airfield, Tunisia, 28 July 1943
- Decimomannu Airfield, Sardinia, Italy, c. 9 November 1943
- Alto Airfield, Corsica, France, c. 19 September 1944
- Dijon-Longvic Airfield (Y-9), France, 11 November 1944
- Dôle-Tavaux Airfield (Y-7), France, 2 April 1945
- Pfreimd, Germany, 20 June 1945
- Clastres Airfield (A-71), France, c. October-28 November 1945
- Camp Kilmer, New Jersey, 5–7 December 1945
- Mitchel Field (later Mitchel Air Force Base), New York, 9 July 1947 – 27 June 1949
- March Air Force Base, California, 1 December 1952 – 15 September 1960
- Mather Air Force Base, California, 1 February 1963 – 30 September 1989
- Kobani Landing Zone, Syria, c. 15 June 2018 – c. 5 May 2020

=== Aircraft ===
- Martin B-26 Marauder, 1942–1945
- Boeing B-29 Superfortress, 1952–1953
- Boeing YRB-47B Stratojet, 1953
- Boeing B-47 Stratojet, 1953–1960
- Boeing B-52F Stratofortress, 1963–1968
- Boeing B-52G Stratofortress, 1968–1989

=== Awards and campaigns ===
Award streamer	Award	Dates	Notes
	Distinguished Unit Citation	12 May 1944	Italy, 441st Bombardment Squadron
	Distinguished Unit Citation	15 March 1945	441st Bombardment Squadron
	Air Force Meritorious Unit Award	15 June 2018–19 April 2019	441st Air Expeditionary Squadron
	Air Force Meritorious Unit Award	1 May 2019–5 May 2020	441st Air Expeditionary Squadron
	Air Force Outstanding Unit Award	18 June-31 July 1965 and 1 December 1965-1 March 1966	441st Bombardment Squadron
	Air Force Outstanding Unit Award	2 March-1 April 1966	441st Bombardment Squadron
	Air Force Outstanding Unit Award	1 July 1974-30 June 1976	441st Bombardment Squadron
	Air Force Outstanding Unit Award	1 July 1981-30 June 1983	441st Bombardment Squadron
	French Croix de Guerre with Palm	April, May, and June 1944	441st Bombardment Squadron

Campaign Streamer	Campaign	Dates	Notes
	Tunisia	9 January 1943–13 May 1943	441st Bombardment Squadron
	Antisubmarine, EAME Theater	9 January 1943–April 1943	441st Bombardment Squadron
	Air Combat, EAME Theater	9 January 1943–11 May 1945	441st Bombardment Squadron
	Sicily	14 May 1943–17 August 1943	441st Bombardment Squadron
	Naples-Foggia	18 August 1943–21 January 1944	441st Bombardment Squadron
	Anzio	22 January 1944–24 May 1944	441st Bombardment Squadron
	Rome-Arno	22 January 1944–9 September 1944	441st Bombardment Squadron
	Southern France	15 August 1944–14 September 1944	441st Bombardment Squadron
	North Apennines	10 September 1944–11 November 1944	441st Bombardment Squadron
	Northern France	25 July 1944–14 September 1944	441st Bombardment Squadron
	Rhineland	11 November 1944–21 March 1945	441st Bombardment Squadron
	Central Europe	22 March 1944–21 May 1945	441st Bombardment Squadron

== See also ==
- List of B-52 Units of the United States Air Force
- US intervention in the Syrian civil war#Withdrawal from north Syrua
- List of Martin B-26 Marauder operators
- List of B-29 Superfortress operators
- List of B-47 units of the United States Air Force
