= Mather Air Force Base =

US Air Force base in California 1918–1993

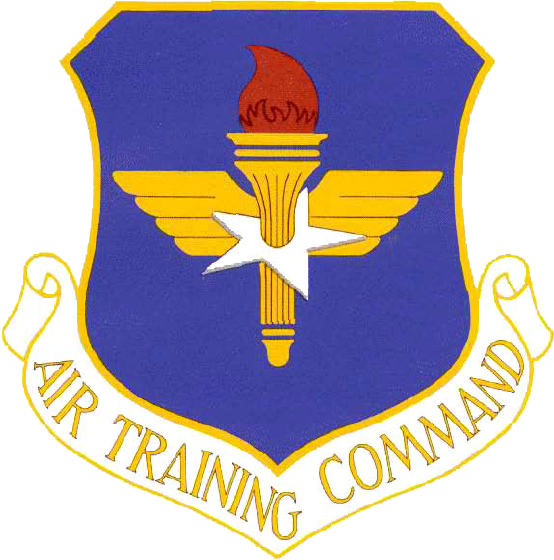
Mather Air Force Base Mather Field
- Part of Air Training Command (ATC)
- Sacramento County, California
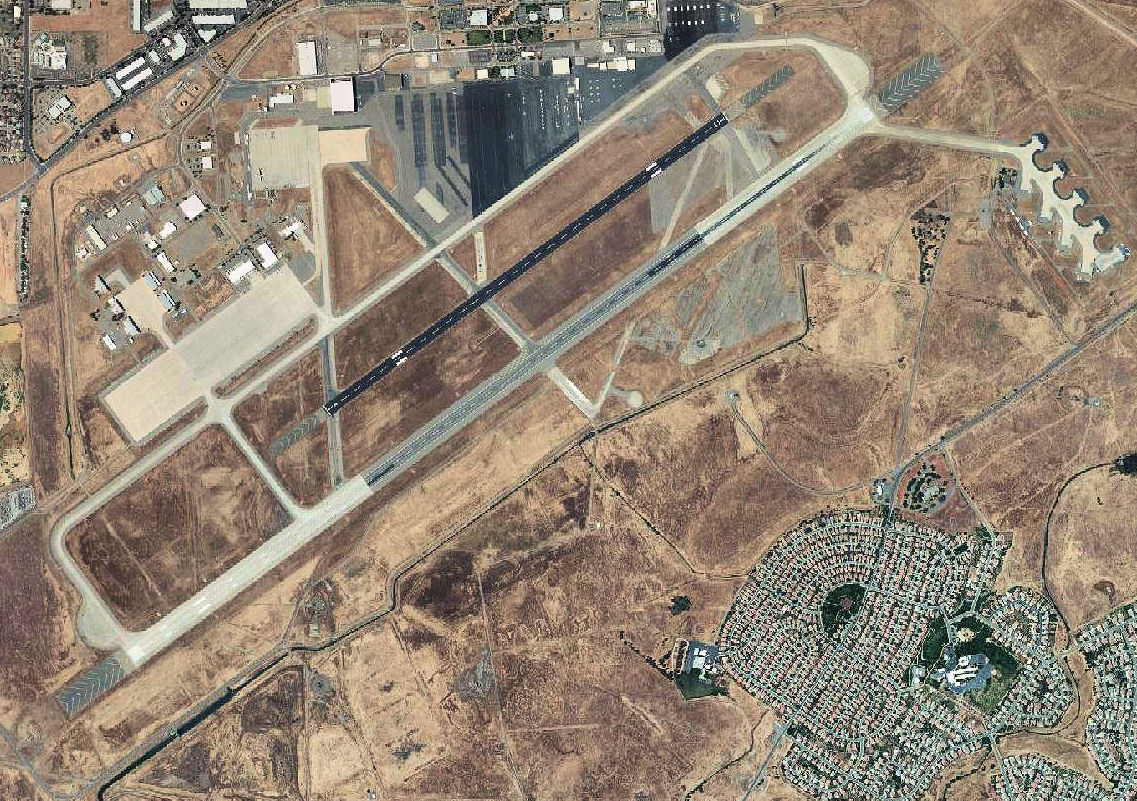
- 2006 USGS airphoto

Site information
- Type: Air Force Base
- Controlled by: United States Air Force

Location
- Location in the United States Location in California
- Coordinates: 38°33′14″N 121°17′51″W

Site history
- Built: 1918
- In use: 1918–1993
- Battles/wars: World War I World War II

Garrison information
- Garrison: 323d Flying Training Wing

Mather Air Force Base (Mather AFB) was a United States Air Force Base, which was closed in 1993 pursuant to a post-Cold War BRAC decision. It was located 12 miles (19 km) east of Sacramento, on the south side of U.S. Route 50 in Sacramento County, California. Mather Field was one of 32 Air Service training camps established after the United States entry into World War I in April 1917.

The Mather AFB land has various post-military uses including Sacramento Mather Airport, established in 1995. Some of the land was included in the City of Rancho Cordova, when it was incorporated in 2003. Mather Field also now serves as home of the 149th Intelligence Squadron of the 195th Wing, Air National Guard.

== History ==
Mather Air Force Base was named after Second Lieutenant Carl Spencer Mather, a 25-year-old army pilot killed in a mid-air collision while training at Ellington Field, Texas, on 30 January 1918. Mather learned to fly in 1914 at the Curtiss Flying School in Hammondsport, New York, and became an instructor there at the age of 20. He enlisted as an aviation cadet in August 1917 and as a licensed pilot was commissioned with part of his class as a second lieutenant on 20 January 1918. He continued training to earn a Reserve Military Aviator rating and promotion to first lieutenant but was killed ten days later. The remainder of his class requested that Mills Field be renamed in Mather's honor.

=== World War I ===
In January 1918, the Department of War sent a cadre of officers to the Sacramento, California, area to survey sites for an aviation school. The group decided on a location about 12 miles southeast of Sacramento called Mills Station. An agreement to lease the land to the Army was concluded, and the construction of some 50 buildings began on 15 March 1918. Mills Field, named after the local community, was opened on 30 April 1918. It covered over 700 acres and could accommodate up to 1,000 personnel. Dozens of wooden buildings served as headquarters, maintenance, and officers' quarters. Enlisted men had to bivouac in tents. Mather Field's first commander was 1st Lieutenant Sam P. Burman, who assumed command on 15 March 1918. The first unit stationed there was the 283d Aero Squadron, which was transferred from Rockwell Field, North Island, California.

==== Flight training ====
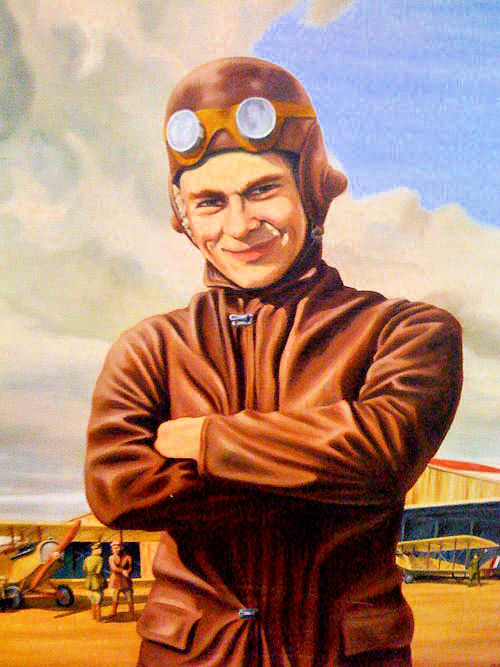
2d L. Carl Spencer Mather

Only a few U.S. Army Air Service aircraft arrived with the 283d Aero Squadron; most of the Curtiss JN-4 Jennys to be used for flight training were shipped in wooden crates by rail. Mather Field served as a base for primary flight training with an eight-week course. The maximum student capacity was 300.

In 1917, flight training occurred in two phases: primary and advanced. Primary training consisted of pilots learning basic flight skills under dual and solo instruction. After completion of their primary training at Mather, flight cadets were then transferred to another base for advanced training. Training units assigned to Mather Field:

- Post Headquarters, Mather Field April 1918 – November 1919
- 200th Aero Squadron, June 1918 – November 1918 (redesignated as Squadron A, Mather Field July 1918)
- 201st Aero Squadron, June 1918 – November 1918 (redesignated as Squadron B, Mather Field July 1918)
- 283d Aero Squadron (II), April 1918 – November 1918 (redesignated as Squadron C, Mather Field July 1918)
- 294th Aero Squadron (II), June 1918 – November 1918 (redesignated as Squadron D, Mather Field July 1918)
- Squadron E, Mather Field July 1918 – November 1918
- Flying School Detachment (Consolidation of Squadrons A-E), November 1918 – October 1919

With the sudden end of World War I in November 1918, the future operational status of Mather Field was unknown. Many local officials speculated that the U.S. government would keep the field open because of the outstanding combat record established by Mather-trained pilots in Europe. Locals also pointed to the optimal weather conditions in the Sacramento area for flight training. Cadets in flight training on 11 November 1918 were allowed to complete their training, however no new cadets were assigned to the base. The separate training squadrons were consolidated into a single Flying School detachment, because many of the personnel at Mather were being demobilized. Flight training activities finally ceased on 8 November 1919.

=== Inter-war years ===
With the end of World War I, in December 1919 Mather Field was closed as an active airfield. However, a small caretaker unit was assigned to the facility for administration. Nonetheless, on 13 December 1919, the United States House of Representatives passed an appropriations bill for $9.6 million for the purchase of additional land at military camps "which are to be made part of the permanent military establishment". Mather Field was allocated $78,000 of this amount.

Mather was used by the aerial forestry patrol. It also was used intermittently to support small military units. However, with the return to a peacetime economy, Mather Field were deemed unnecessary as a military training facility, and it was closed on 12 May 1923. The War Department ordered the small caretaker force at Mather Field to dismantle all remaining structures and to sell them as surplus. Throughout the remainder of the 1920s, the War Department leased the vacant land to local farmers and ranchers.

Mather Field was reactivated on 1 April 1930 as a sub post of the Presidio of San Francisco and Hamilton Field during the 1930s, and of Stockton Field briefly in 1941. Mather, however, had to be refitted with new electrical, water, and telephone lines. Soon, Mather was again alive with activity, though the renovation process could not compare to the original base construction.

Note: The airfield served only for aerial forest patrol, beginning 8 January 1919. It was placed on inactive status, 22 June 1922; and closed on 12 May 1923. The airfield was reactivated 1 April 1930; and placed in inactive status, 1 November 1932. It was designated a subpost of the Presidio of San Francisco, unk-13 May 1935; designated a subpost of Hamilton Field, 13 May 1935; designated a subpost of Stockton Field, 21 February 1941.

=== World War II ===
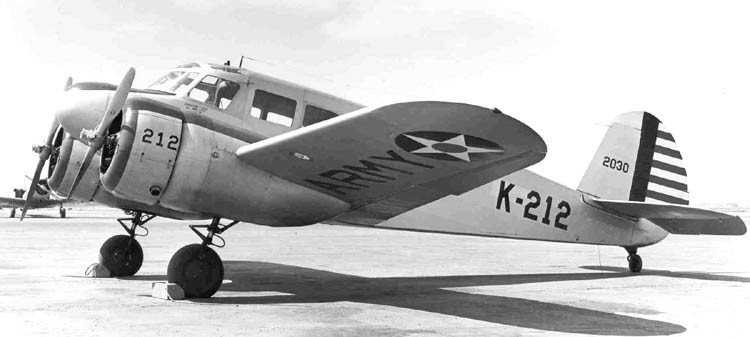
A Cessna AT-17 Bobcat at the base, 9 May 1942

The Field was reestablished as a separate post and activated on 13 May 1941. The field area was increased from 872 to 4,418 acres (17.88 km^{2}) in June 1941. Sub-bases and auxiliary fields of Mather included:

- Concord Army Air Field 37°59′24″N 122°03′24″W
- Franklin Auxiliary Airfield (Aux 1) 38°18′13″N 121°25′47″W
- Lincoln Auxiliary Airfield (Aux 2) 38°54′20″N 121°21′03″W
- Winter-Davis Flight Strip (Aux 4) 38°34′48″N 121°51′15″W
- Elk Grove Auxiliary Airfield (Aux 5) 38°25′12″N 121°20′39″W

In 1941 Mather Field became the site for advanced navigator training. The Army Air Forces Navigator School began operating on 2 August 1941. Major new construction was completed 16 March 1942. The school consisted of a rigorous 18-week course consisting of instruction in celestial navigation and dead reckoning. To complete the course, cadets were required to spend 100 hours navigating during both local and long-range flights. However, in 1943, Army Air Forces Training Command transferred the Navigator School from Mather Field to Ellington Field, near Houston, Texas.

Mather became a twin-engine Advanced Flying School, training pilots on North American B-25 Mitchell medium bombers. In 1944–45 it became an aerial port of embarkation to the Pacific in preparation for the expected transfer of large numbers of men and aircraft from Europe to the Pacific.

During the summer of 1945, the 509th Composite Group was transferring from its Second Air Force training base at Wendover Army Air Field, Utah, the group landed at Mather prior to embarking on its trans-Pacific movement to Tinian (in the Marianas Island chain).

=== Cold War ===
==== Air Training Command ====
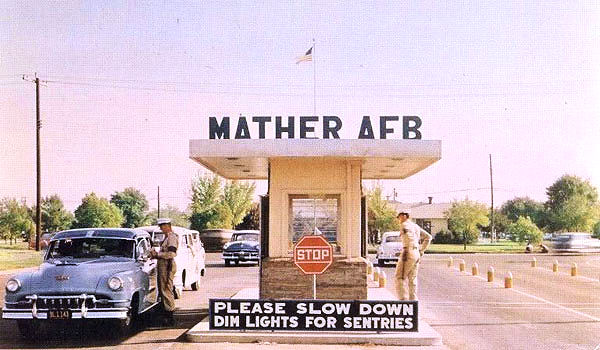
Main Gate, about 1955

During the Cold War, Mather AFB became the sole aerial navigation school for the United States Air Force (USAF) after its companion navigation schools at Harlingen AFB, Texas, and James Connally AFB, Texas, were closed and Ellington AFB was converted into a joint Air National Guard base, Coast Guard air station and NASA flight facility in the 1960s.

The 3535th Navigator Training Wing of Air Training Command (ATC), was responsible for bombardier training beginning in 1946 and later transitioned to undergraduate navigator training (UNT), advanced navigator bombardier training, electronic warfare officer training and weapon systems officer training after the closure of the other navigator training bases. Renamed the 3535th Flying Training Wing, the wing initially flew the Convair T-29 for USAF navigator training until 1974, when it was replaced by the Boeing T-43A (Boeing 737-200) aircraft.

The 3535th was replaced by the 323d Flying Training Wing on 1 April 1973. In 1976, following the decommissioning of Training Squadron Twenty-Nine (VT-29) at Naval Air Station Corpus Christi, Texas, the 323d began training student Naval Flight Officers (NFO) in the Advanced Maritime Navigation training pipeline. U.S. Navy students in this pipeline were destined to fly land-based naval aircraft such as the Lockheed P-3 Orion, Lockheed EP-3 Aries and Lockheed EC-130 and Lockheed LC-130 Hercules aircraft. This resulted in the UNT course being redesignated as Interservice Undergraduate Navigator Training (IUNT). The Navy also activated Naval Air Training Unit (NAVAIRTU) Mather as the parent activity for Navy instructors, Navy students and NATO/Allied naval aviation students assigned to the 323d at Mather. The Marine Aerial Navigation School also relocated to Mather in order to train enlisted United States Marine Corps and United States Coast Guard navigators for Marine Corps KC-130 and Coast Guard HC-130 aircraft. Cessna T-37 aircraft were added to the IUNT curriculum in the late 1970s for USAF students destined for high performance aircraft such as the F-4 Phantom II/RF-4, F-111/FB-111 and B-1 Lancer.

The 323d continued training USAF navigators, NFOs, NATO/Allied students, and conducting advanced training for radar navigator/bombardiers, electronic warfare officers and weapons systems operators until it was inactivated on 30 September 1993. Concurrent with the wing's inactivation, all USAF navigator and NFO maritime navigation pipeline training was moved to Randolph AFB, Texas, and consolidated under the 12th Flying Training Wing, which up until that time trained and certified instructor pilots.

==== Radar stations ====
Mather AFB had a late 1940s/early 1950s Radar Bomb Scoring detachment of the 3903rd Radar Bomb Scoring Squadron.

The Mather AFB general surveillance radar station was established after a second stage of "additional Lashup stations and heavy radar equipment [was] authorized" in the fall of 1949. Site L-37 began operation with an AN/CPS-6 in June 1950, and the 668th Aircraft Control and Warning Squadron was assigned on 1 January 1951 . The station later converted to AN/FPS-20A and AN/FPS-6 and AN/FPS-6B radars. By 1960 the station became a joint-use facility with the Federal Aviation Administration (FAA) and in 1961, the two height-finder radars were removed. The station became part of the San Francisco Air Defense Sector with the radars providing radar data to the Beale AFB DC-18 SAGE Direction Center via the Burroughs AN/FST-2 Coordinate Data Transmitting Set at Mill Valley Air Force Station (Z-28). The 668th was inactivated on 1 September 1961, and Detachment 2 of the 666th Radar Squadron performed subsequent operations until inactivated on 1 September 1966. The FAA operates the Mather radar site with an AN/FPS-91A of the Joint Surveillance System.

==== Strategic Air Command ====
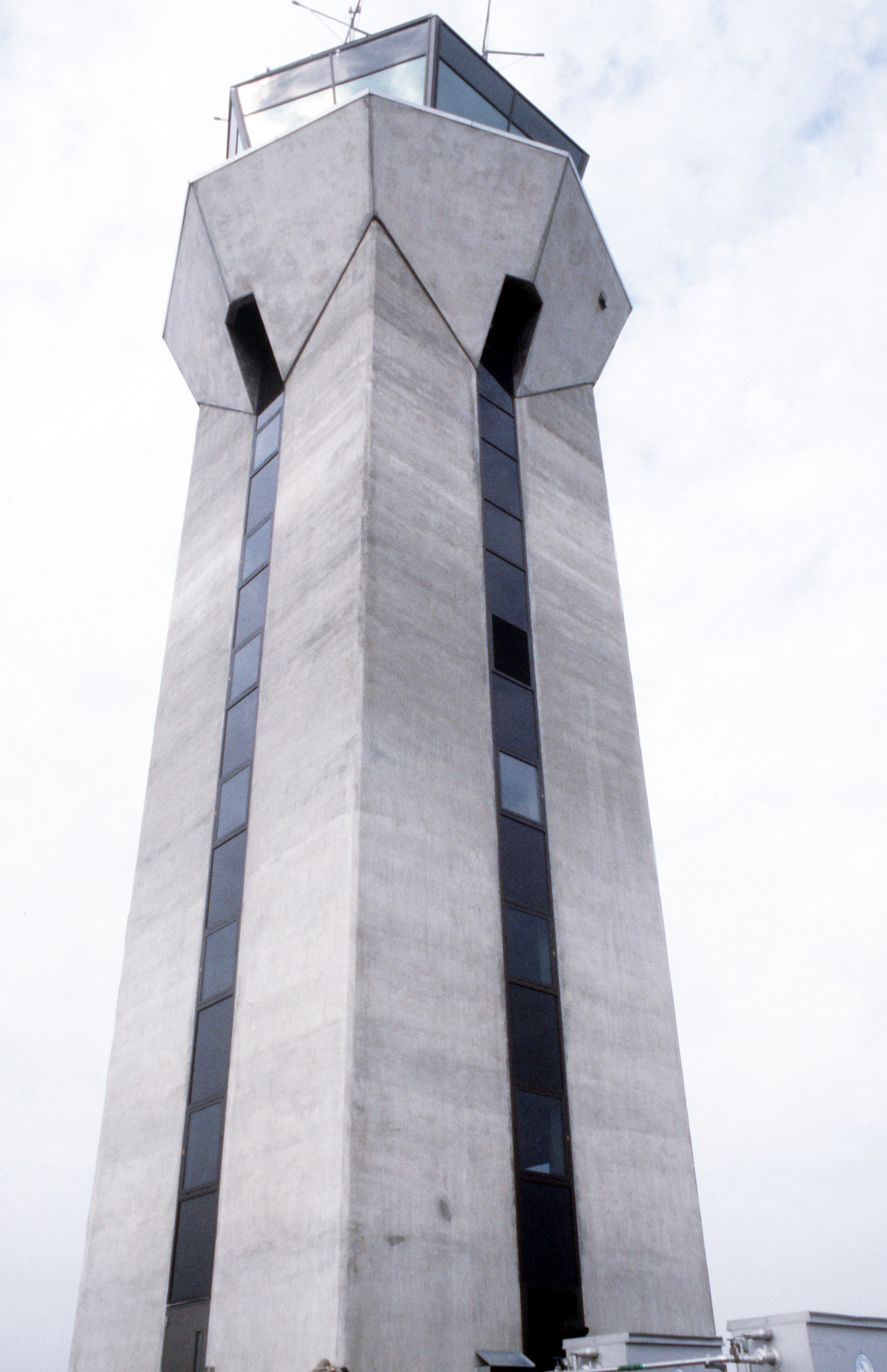
Mather AFB Control Tower, 1986

On 1 April 1958, Strategic Air Command (SAC)'s 4134th Strategic Wing composed of the 72d Bombardment Squadron and 904th Air Refueling Squadron was assigned to Mather AFB, the latter flying the KC-135A Stratotanker. The Strategic Wings were formed in the late 1950s as part of SAC's plan to disperse its heavy bombers over a larger number of bases, thus making it more difficult for the Soviet Union to knock out the entire fleet with a surprise first strike. The wing had one squadron of B-52 Stratofortresses with 15 aircraft. Four of the planes were maintained on 15-minute alert, fully fueled, armed, and ready for combat. The remaining planes were used for training in bombardment missions and air refueling operations. The wing also had a squadron of KC-135 tankers. The 4134th Strategic Wing was discontinued on 1 February 1963.

Det. 1 320 BW operated at the old bomber alert area at Mountain Home AFB, from 1969 until the spring of 1975 when it disbanded and the two bombers and two tankers returned to Mather.

Concurrent with the inactivation of the 4134th, the 320th Bombardment Wing was activated and absorbed its assets. It operated as a tenant unit from 1963 to 1989, initially with the B-52F Stratofortress before converting in 1968 to the B-52G. The 441st Bombardment Squadron replaced the 72d and the 904th Air Refueling Squadron was transferred from the 4134th to the 320th.. In addition to SAC nuclear alert, the 320th also conducted conventional operations, including maritime missions in support of the U.S. Navy with aerial mines and AGM-84 Harpoon missiles. The 320th was inactivated on 30 September 1989.

The 940th Air Refueling Group, an Air Force Reserve unit, moved to Mather AFB from McClellan AFB in 1977, shortly after it transitioned to the KC-135A. Operationally-gained by SAC, the unit upgraded to the KC-135E in 1986. With SAC's inactivation in 1992, the unit was then gained by the Air Mobility Command and redesignated the 940th Air Refueling Wing in 1993. Following the closure of Mather AFB, the 940th relocated back to McClellan AFB in 1993. When McClellan closed in 1998 the wing then moved to its current station at Beale AFB.

=== Closure ===
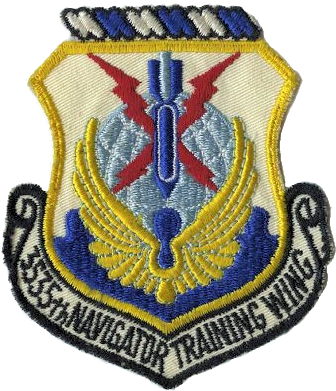
Emblem of the 3535th Navigator Training Wing (ATC)

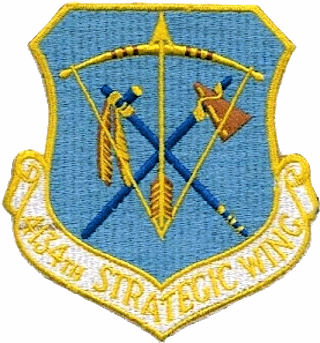
Emblem of the 4134th Strategic Wing

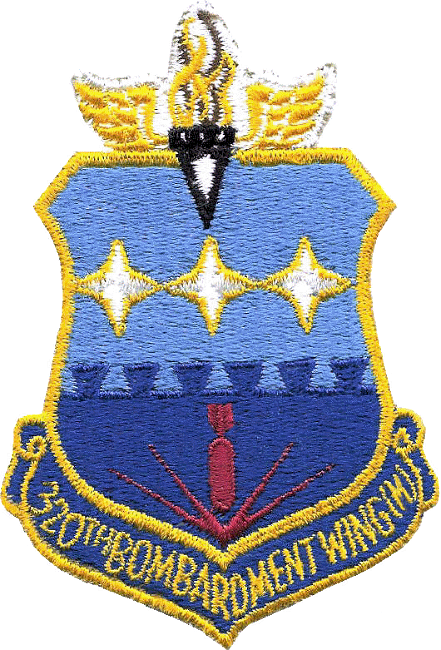
Emblem of the 320th Bombardment Wing

Parts of the airfield were listed on the National Priorities List as a Superfund site on 22 July 1987. The entire site was listed on 21 November 1989. On 30 September 1993, the 5,845 acres (23.7 km^{2}), including 129 acres (0.52 km^{2}) of easements, of Mather AFB was decommissioned under the 1988 Base Realignment and Closure Commission. Most of the base was transferred to Sacramento County. Current sites of the former air force base include:

- Sacramento Mather Airport (1995)
- Mather Regional Park
- Martin Collier Phillips Corporation Aviation Port
- Veterans Administration Medical Center
- FAA Northern California Terminal Radar Approach Control TRACON
- Mather Community Campus, a transitional living facility (1995).

=== Major commands to which assigned ===
- Army Air Service, March 1918–22 June 1922
- Army Air Corps, 2 July 1926 – November 1932
- General Headquarters (GHQ) Air Force, 1 March 1935

Redesignated: Air Force Combat Command, 20 June 1941

- Air Corps Flying Training Command, 23 January 1942

Redesignated: AAF Flying Training Command, 15 March 1942
Redesignated: AAF Training Command, 31 July 1943

- Air Transport Command, 1 October 1944
- Army Air Force Training Command, 20 December 1945

Redesignated: Air Training Command, 1 July 1946
Redesignated: Air Education and Training Command, 1 July-1 October 1993

=== Major units assigned ===
- 283d Aero Squadron (later Squadron "C", Mather Field), 30 April 1918 – 8 January 1919
- 91st Aero Squadron, 3 November 1919 – 24 January 1920; 3 November 1920 – 1 May 1921
- 9th Aero Squadron, 27 April 1920 – 29 June 1922
- 28th Squadron, 20 September 1921 – 28 June 1922
- 20th Pursuit Group, 15 November 1930 – 14 October 1932
- 77th Air Base Group, 26 July 1941 – 19 January 1943
- 86th Air Base Group, 1 August 1941 – 24 November 1941
- 87th Air Base Group, 1 August 1941 – 24 November 1941
- Air Corps Advanced Flying School (later Army Air Corps Advanced Flying School, Army Air Force Pilot School, Specialized Two Engine), 15 May 1941 – 2 October 1944.
- 67th Sub Depot, 12 August 1941 – 30 April 1944
- Army Air Force Navigation School, 27 May −5 November 1943
- 1505th AAF Base Unit, 15 September 1944 – 29 December 1945
- 1564th AAF Base Unit, 15 September 1944 – 29 December 1945
- Port of Aerial Embarkation, 4 September 1944 – 29 December 1945
- 2622d AAF Base Unit (later 2622d Air Force Base Unit), 20 December 1945 – 28 August 1948
- 417th AAF Base Unit, 1 October 1946 – 1 March 1947
- Army Air Force Bombardier School, Mather Field (later USAF Bombardier School, USAF Aircraft Observer's School, USAF Navigator School), 12 February 1946 – 1 October 1993
- 3535th Bombardier Training Wing (later 3535th Observer Training Wing, 3535th Aircraft Observer Training Wing, 3535th Navigator Training Wing), 26 August 1948 – 1 May 1963

3535th Air Base Group, 26 August 1948 – 1 April 1973

- 8604th Bombardment Training Group, 27 June 1949 – 28 May 1951
- USAF Advanced Flying School (Multi-Engine), 1 September 1953 – 1 August 1958
- 4134th Strategic Wing, 1 May 1958 – 1 February 1963

320th Bombardment Wing, 1 February 1963 – 30 September 1989

- 904th Air Refueling Squadron, 1 March 1959 – 1 October 1986
- 3d Aeromedical Evacuation Group, 2 July 1960 – 1 January 1967
- 323d Flying Training Wing, 1 April 1973 – 30 September 1993
- 940th Air Refueling Group, 1 January 1977 – 30 September 1993

Source for major commands and major units assigned:

== Natural history ==
There are rare wetland vernal pools, which are unique to California, and numerous plant and animal species exist on the site that became Mather Air Force Base. The chiefly grassland ecological community continues to hold a considerable number of plants, mammals, birds and arthropods. Within the plant community are large numbers of native grass and forb species. One example of a native wildflower found here is the Yellow Mariposa Lily. Another example is the Vernal Pool Buttercup var. trisepalus. The vernal pools at Mather are also habitat to Ahart's Dwarf Rush var. ahartii, Boggs Lake hedgehyssop, and the rare Legenere limosa.

== See also ==
- California World War II Army Airfields
- 35th Flying Training Wing (World War II)
- List of USAF Aerospace Defense Command General Surveillance Radar Stations
- List of Training Section Air Service airfields
