= Borj El Amri =

- Town
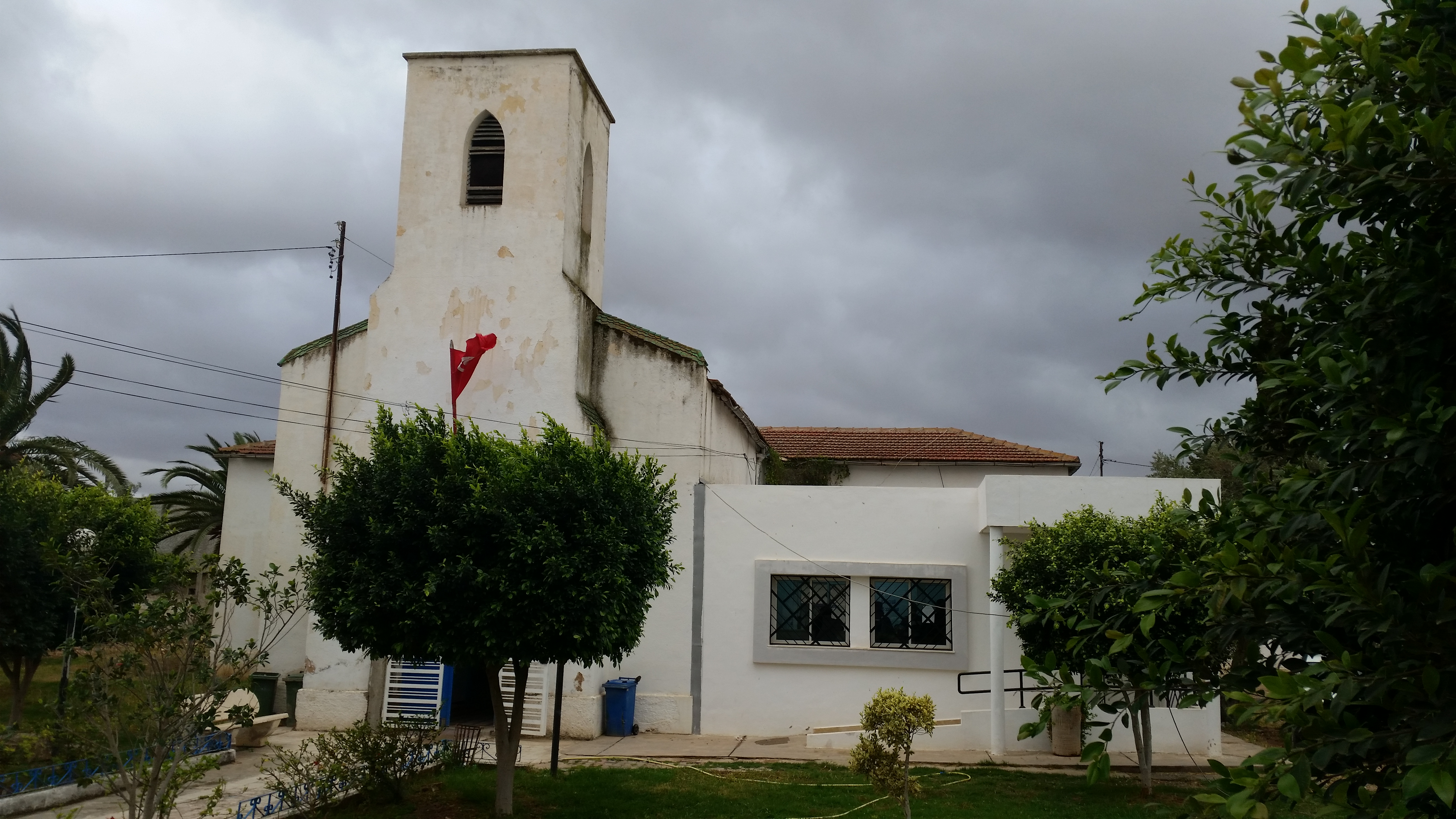
- Saint Vincent de Paul Church

- Location within Tunisia
- Coordinates: 36°42′10″N 009°53′16″E
- Country: Tunisia
- Governorate: Manouba
- Time zone: UTC+1 (CET)

Borj El Amri or Bordj El Amri (Arabic: برج العامري) is a town in the Manouba Governorate of Tunisia. It is located 30 kilometres (19 mi) southwest of Tunis.

The town of Borj El Amri municipality contains 6,458 inhabitants and is the main town (chef-lieu) of the Borj El Amri delegation which has 18,977 inhabitants.

Borj El Amri is home to the School of the Tunisian Air Force and is served by the Borj El Amri Airport.

== History ==
The town was created by a decree of the Bey of Tunis in 1904. At that time it was known as Massicault in honor of Justin Massicault, the Resident General of France in Tunisia from 1886 to 1892. It was renamed in 1961 after Borj El Amri, an ancient fortress (borj).

During World War II, from January to April 1943, the Germans operated a forced labour camp for Jews in the town.

== Climate ==
Climate data for Borj El Amri (1961–1990, extremes 1985–1994)
Month	Jan	Feb	Mar	Apr	May	Jun	Jul	Aug	Sep	Oct	Nov	Dec	Year
Record high °C (°F)	25.5 (77.9)	25.6 (78.1)	29.6 (85.3)	31.6 (88.9)	43.0 (109.4)	43.5 (110.3)	48.2 (118.8)	46.5 (115.7)	44.0 (111.2)	37.4 (99.3)	29.6 (85.3)	25.0 (77.0)	48.2 (118.8)
Mean daily maximum °C (°F)	15.7 (60.3)	17.3 (63.1)	19.0 (66.2)	22.8 (73.0)	27.3 (81.1)	31.8 (89.2)	35.8 (96.4)	36.1 (97.0)	32.5 (90.5)	27.7 (81.9)	20.5 (68.9)	17.1 (62.8)	25.3 (77.5)
Daily mean °C (°F)	10.6 (51.1)	11.3 (52.3)	12.9 (55.2)	15.5 (59.9)	19.8 (67.6)	23.8 (74.8)	27.3 (81.1)	28.0 (82.4)	25.3 (77.5)	21.7 (71.1)	15.3 (59.5)	11.9 (53.4)	18.6 (65.5)
Mean daily minimum °C (°F)	5.4 (41.7)	5.3 (41.5)	6.8 (44.2)	8.3 (46.9)	12.3 (54.1)	15.8 (60.4)	18.7 (65.7)	19.8 (67.6)	18.0 (64.4)	15.6 (60.1)	10.1 (50.2)	6.7 (44.1)	11.9 (53.4)
Record low °C (°F)	−2.2 (28.0)	−3.6 (25.5)	−1.2 (29.8)	1.0 (33.8)	2.8 (37.0)	7.6 (45.7)	9.6 (49.3)	12.6 (54.7)	9.0 (48.2)	5.4 (41.7)	−1.6 (29.1)	−3.6 (25.5)	−3.6 (25.5)
Average precipitation mm (inches)	48.5 (1.91)	37.1 (1.46)	38.2 (1.50)	34.9 (1.37)	18.7 (0.74)	9.2 (0.36)	12.2 (0.48)	21.7 (0.85)	25.6 (1.01)	40.2 (1.58)	42.8 (1.69)	45.9 (1.81)	375 (14.76)
Average precipitation days (≥ 1.0 mm)	6.9	7.6	6.0	5.0	4.0	1.3	1.3	1.4	2.9	5.1	5.4	6.4	53.3
Average relative humidity (%)	76	72	70	65	62	59	53	55	59	67	72	75	65
Mean monthly sunshine hours	124.0	145.6	189.1	213.0	241.8	264.0	313.1	285.2	234.0	186.0	150.0	142.6	2,488.4
Source: Institut National de la Météorologie (precipitation days/humidity/sun 1961–1990) (Note: The Station ID for Borj El Amri is 11817211.)
