= 320th Air Expeditionary Wing =

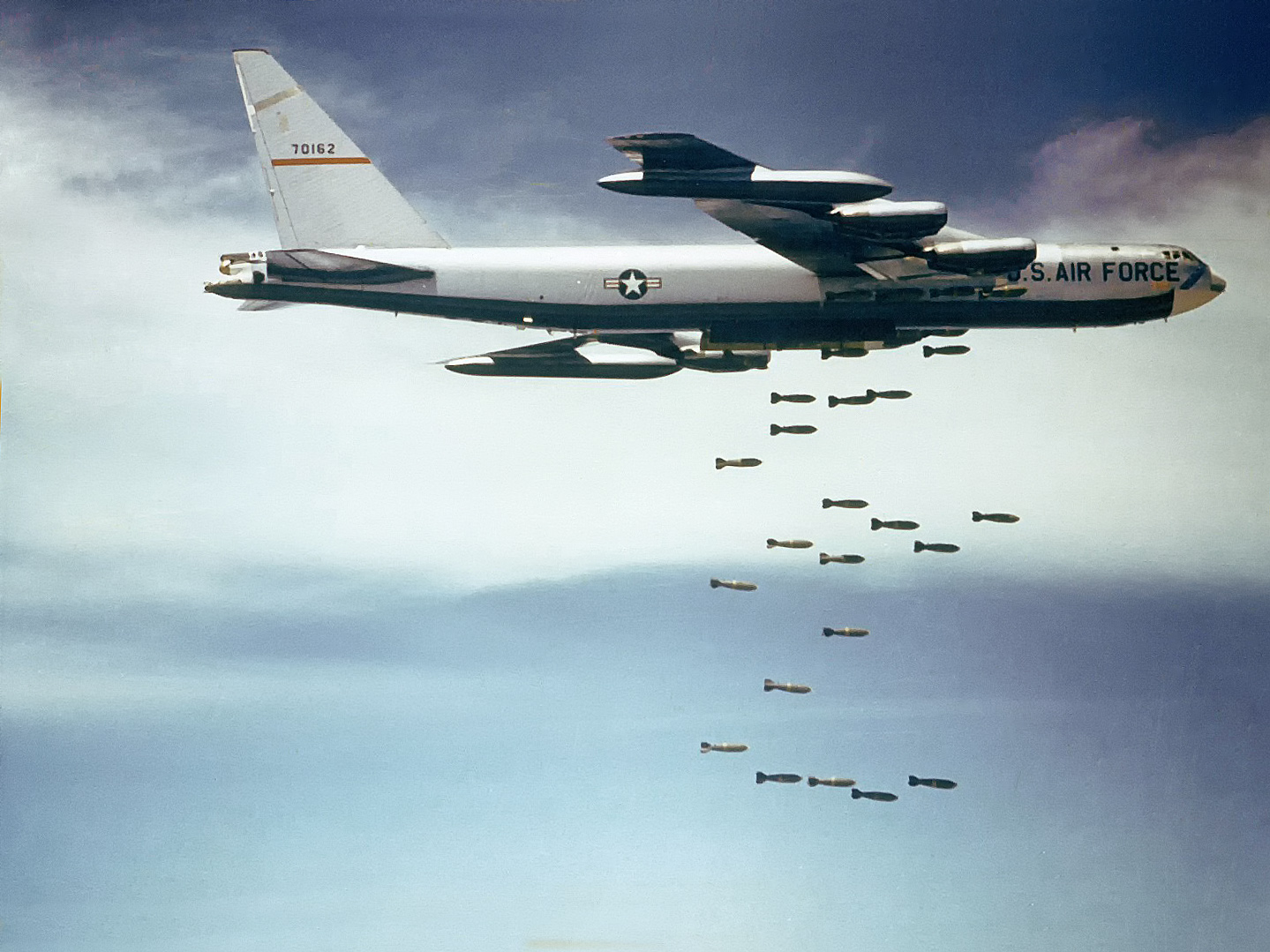
- Boeing B-52F Stratofortress Casper the Friendly Ghost of the 320th Bombardment Wing on an Arc Light mission
- Active: 1942–1945; 1947–1949; 1952–1960; 1963–1989; after 1998
- Country: United States
- Branch: United States Air Force
- Mottos: Forever Battling (World War II), Strength Through Awareness (since 1952)
- Engagements: World War II; European Theater of Operations Ribbon (1942–1945); Vietnam War (1965–1973); Expeditionary Service; Various Operations (1990s): Global War on Terrorism; Afghanistan Campaign (2001–2006) Iraq Campaign (2003–2006)
- Decorations: Presidential Unit Citation (2x) Air Force Outstanding Unit Award with Combat "V" device Air Force Outstanding Unit Award (4x) French Croix de Guerre with Palm

Commanders
- Current commander: Joel D. Jackson
- Notable commanders: George Lee Butler; Howell M. Estes II; William Crumm; John A. Hilger

Insignia
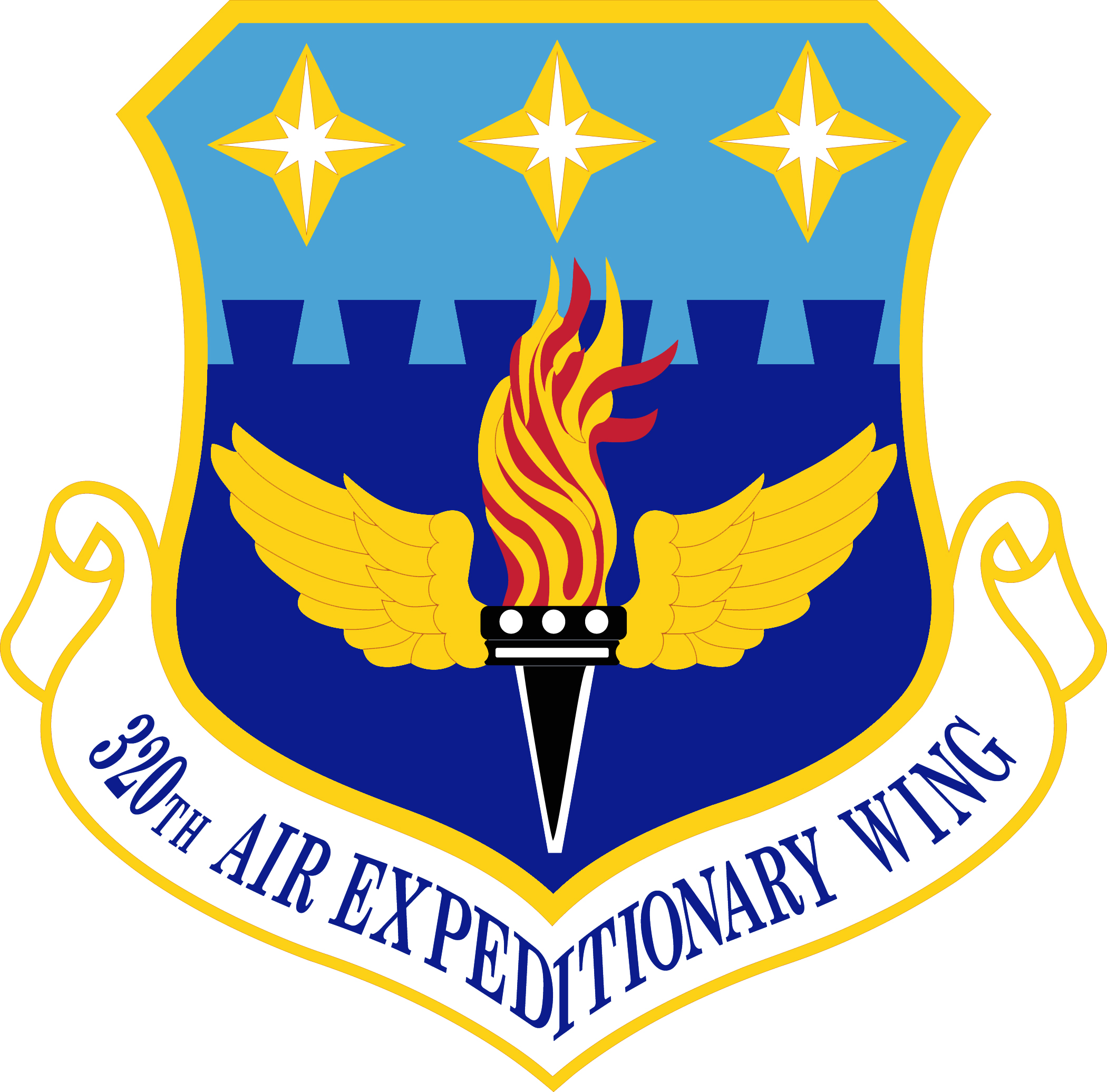
- 320th Air Expeditionary Wing emblem

The 320th Air Expeditionary Wing is a provisional United States Air Force unit assigned to the Air Force District of Washington. It is stationed at Bolling Air Force Base, District of Columbia. The 320th may be activated or inactivated at any time.

The 320th was activated at Bolling in December 2006 for former President Gerald Ford's state funeral during the Christmas and New Year holidays, attaching 634 personnel to complete a 10-day mission in three joint-operation areas. In less than 12 hours from notification, the 320 AEW deployed 167 joint forces and equipment for JTF Ceremony Forward.

It was activated in December 2008 to support Air Force requirements during the 2009 Presidential Inauguration, working with the Armed Forces Inaugural Committee, or AFIC.

The wing was originally activated during World War II and served with Twelfth Air Force as the 320th Bombardment Group. The unit was equipped with the Martin B-26 Marauder aircraft. The group was later consolidated with the 320th Bombardment Wing, a component organization of Strategic Air Command's deterrent force during the Cold War, as a strategic bombardment wing.

== History ==
=== World War II ===
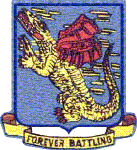
320th Bombardment Group emblem (approved 3 March 1943)

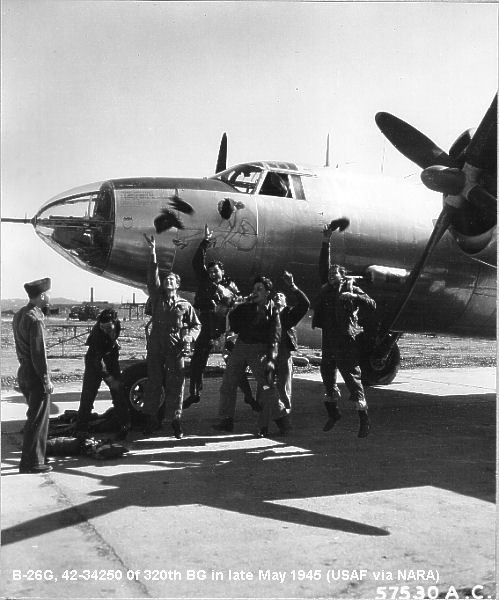
Martin B-26G-5-MA Marauder, AAF Ser. No. 42-34250, of the 320th Bomb Group crew celebrating the end of hostilities, May 1945

Constituted as the 320th Bombardment Group (Medium) on 19 June 1942 and activated on 23 June at MacDill Field, Florida. The operational squadrons of the group were the 441st, 442d, 443d and 444th Bombardment Squadrons. The 320th was equipped with the Martin B-26 Marauder aircraft.

The group was subsequently relocated to nearby Drane Field, Florida. Most of the group moved to North Africa via England, August–December 1942; crews then flew their planes over the South Atlantic route and arrived in North Africa, December 1942 – January 1943.

It began combat with Twelfth Air Force in April 1943 and operated from bases in Algeria, Tunisia, Sardinia, and Corsica until November 1944. During the period April–July 1943, flew missions against enemy shipping in the approaches to Tunisia, attacked installations in Sardinia, participated in Operation Corkscrew, the reduction of Pantelleria, and supported the Allied invasion of Sicily. It then bombed marshalling yards, bridges, airdromes, road junctions, viaducts, harbors, fuel dumps, defense positions, and other targets in Italy. The group supported forces at Salerno and knocked out targets to aid the seizure of Naples and the crossing of the Volturno River. Missions were flown to Anzio and Cassino and the group engaged in interdictory operations in central Italy in preparation for the advance toward Rome.

In a disastrous error on 28 January 1944, the group destroyed a train loaded with Allied POWs on a bridge at Orvieto North, Italy. The death toll has been reported at 450.

The 320th Bombardment Group received the French Croix de Guerre with Palm for action in preparation for and in support of Allied offensive operations in central Italy, April–June 1944. It was the first such citation to be awarded to an American unit by the provisional French government in World War II. The unit also received a Distinguished Unit Citation (DUC) for a mission on 12 May 1944 when, in the face of an intense antiaircraft barrage, the group bombed enemy troop concentrations near Fondi in support of the U.S. Fifth Army's advance toward Rome. From June to November 1944 operations included interdictory missions in the Po Valley, support for the invasion of Southern France and attacks on enemy communications in northern Italy.

The 320th was then moved to France in November 1944 and bombed bridges, rail lines, gun positions, barracks, supply points, ammunition dumps, and other targets in France and Germany until V-E Day. The group received a second DUC for operations on 15 March 1945 when the group bombed pillboxes, trenches, weapon pits, and roads within the Siegfried Line to enable a breakthrough by the Seventh United States Army.

With the end of hostilities in Europe, the group moved to Germany in June 1945 and participated in the disarmament program. It returned to the United States, November–December 1945, and was inactivated on 4 December 1945.

=== Strategic Air Command ===
==== Medium Bomber Era ====
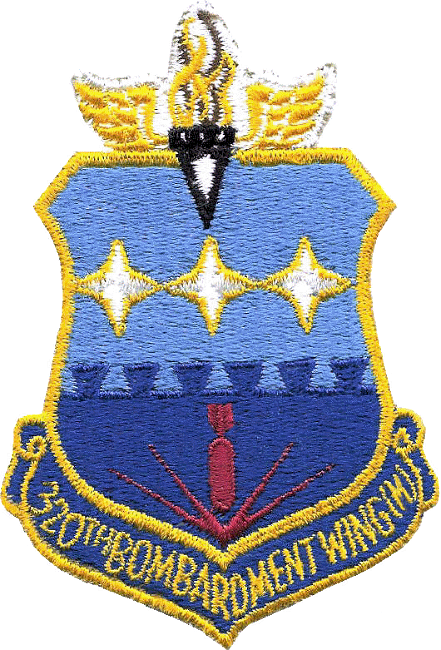
320th Bombardment Wing (approved 22 January 1953)

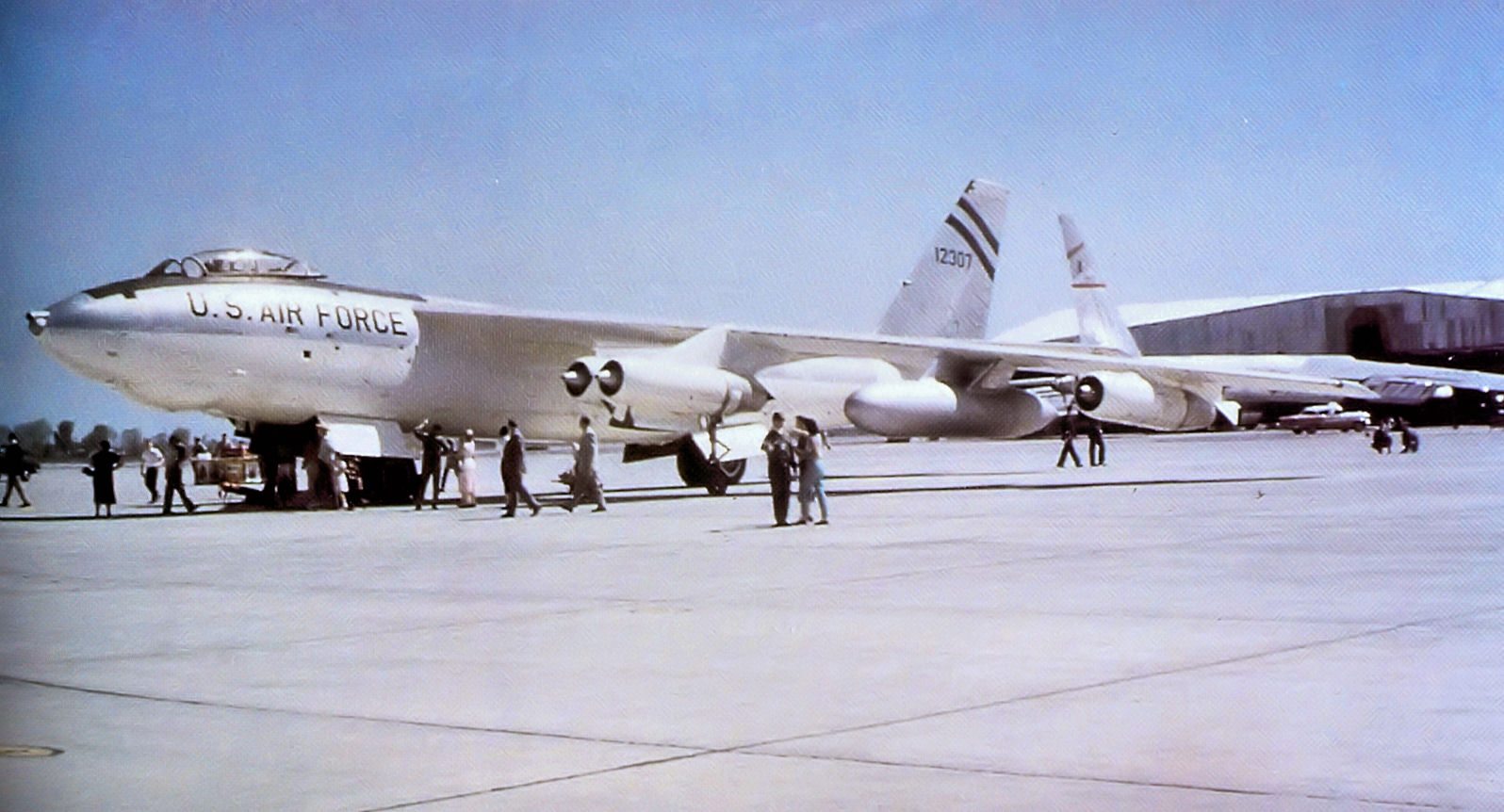
320th Bombardment Wing Boeing B-47B Stratojet 1953

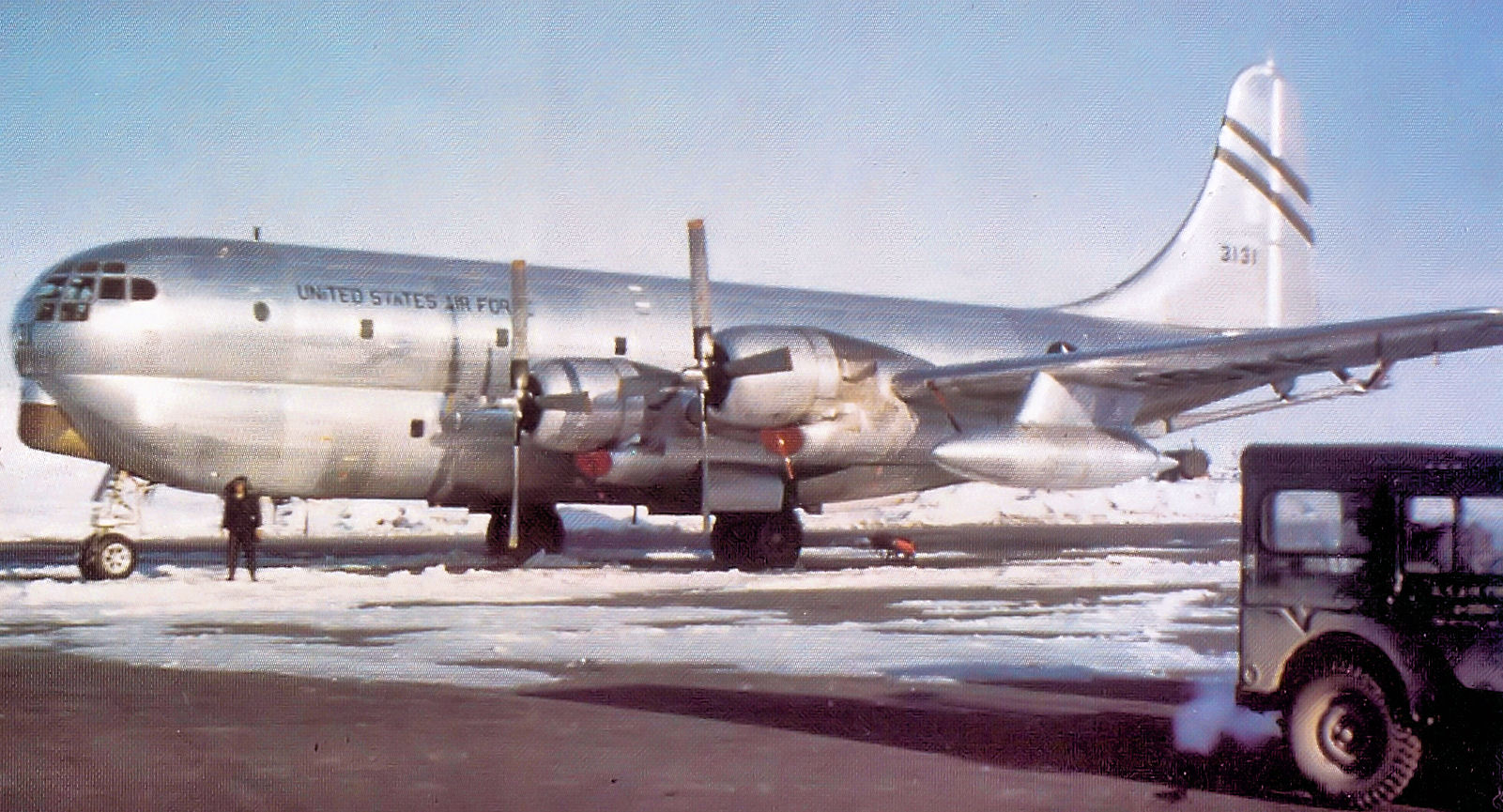
320th Air Refueling Squadron Boeing KC-97G Stratofreighter at Thule AB 1953.

The 320th Bombardment Wing, Medium was activated at March Air Force Base, California on 1 December 1952. The 320th BW assumed the assets of the 106th Bombardment Wing, a federalized New York Air National Guard unit which was brought onto active duty during the Korean War.

At March, the wing was initially equipped with second-line Boeing B-29 Superfortresses and conducted global bombardment training and air refueling operations to meet Strategic Air Command (SAC) commitments. The wing was also employed for training Air Force Reservists and Air National Guardsmen to backfill rotating B-29 Superfortress combat crews which were deployed by Fifteenth Air Force to Far East Air Forces serving in the Korean War.

The wing replaced its propeller-driven B-29s with new Boeing B-47E Stratojet swept-wing medium bombers capable of flying at high subsonic speeds and primarily designed for penetrating the airspace of the Soviet Union in 1953. The wing trained the initial B-47 cadre for the 96th Bombardment Wing, from December 1953 to January 1955 and subsequently deployed as a wing to RAF Brize Norton, England from 5 June to 4 September 1954 and Andersen Air Force Base, Guam from 5 October 1956 to 11 January 1957. In the late 1950s, the B-47 Stratojet was considered to be reaching obsolescence, and was being phased out of SAC's strategic arsenal. Aircraft were reassigned to other SAC units as replacements in late 1959 and 1960 becoming non-operational.

==== B-52 Era ====
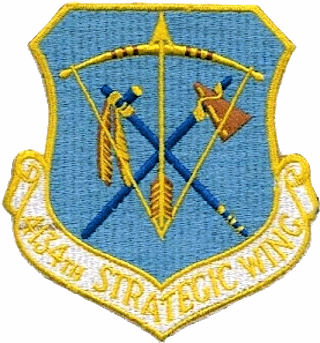
Emblem of the 4134th Strategic Wing

4134th Strategic Wing

With the retirement of the Stratojet, the 320th Bomb Wing was reassigned to Mather Air Force Base, California, an Air Training Command base, on 1 February 1963 where it assumed the assets of the 4134th Strategic Wing, a SAC tenant organization at Mather. The 4134th was established by SAC on 1 May 1958 at Mather and assigned to the 14th Air Division as part of SAC's plan to disperse its Boeing B-52 Stratofortress heavy bombers over a larger number of bases, thus making it more difficult for the Soviet Union to knock out the entire fleet with a surprise first strike. The wing was assigned only two maintenance squadrons until 1 July 1958 when the 72d Bombardment Squadron, consisting of 15 B-52Fs. moved to Mather from Travis Air Force Base, California where it had been one of the three squadrons of the 5th Bombardment Wing. Starting in 1960, one third of the squadron's aircraft were maintained on fifteen-minute alert, fully fueled and ready for combat to reduce vulnerability to a Soviet missile strike. This was increased to half the squadron's aircraft in 1962. The 4039th (and later the 416th) continued to maintain an alert commitment until 1965, and periodically thereafter when not supporting operations in Southeast Asia. Additional maintenance squadrons and a squadron to provide security for special weapons were activated at the same time.

On 1 January 1959 the 49th Aviation Depot Squadron was activated to oversee the wing's special weapons. The 4135th became fully organized on 1 July 1959 when the 904th Air Refueling Squadron, flying Boeing KC-135 Stratotankers was activated and assigned to the wing. In 1962, the wing's bombers began to be equipped with the GAM-77 Hound Dog and the GAM-72 Quail air-launched cruise missiles, The 4134th Airborne Missile Maintenance Squadron was activated in November to maintain these missiles

In 1962, in order to retain the lineage of its MAJCOM 4-digit combat units and to perpetuate the lineage of many currently inactive bombardment units with illustrious World War II records, Headquarters SAC received authority from Headquarters USAF to discontinue its Major Command controlled (MAJCON) strategic wings that were equipped with combat aircraft and to activate Air Force controlled (AFCON units), most of which were inactive at the time which could carry a lineage and history.

320th Bombardment Wing As a result, the 4134th was replaced by the 320th Bombardment Wing, Heavy, which assumed its mission, personnel, and equipment on 1 February 1963. The 320th Wing continued, through temporary bestowal, the history, and honors of the World War II 320th Bombardment Group. It was also entitled to retain the honors (but not the history or lineage) of the 4134th. This temporary bestowal ended in January 1984, when the wing and group were consolidated into a single unit. In the same way the 441st Bombardment Squadron, one of the unit's World War II historical bomb squadrons, replaced the 341st Bombaardment Squadron. The 49th Munitions Maintenance Squadron and the 904th Air Refueling Squadron were reassigned to the 320th. Component support units were replaced by units with numerical designation of the newly established wing. Under the Dual Deputate organization, under this plan flying squadrons reported to the wing Deputy Commander for Operations and maintenance squadrons reported to the wing Deputy Commander for Maintenance. (Note: all flying and maintenance squadrons were directly assigned to the wing, so no operational group element was activated.) Each of the new units assumed the personnel, equipment, and mission of its predecessor.

At Mather, the wing performed global bombardment training and air refueling operations to meet SAC commitments, February 1963 – 1965 and later.

In 1964 and 1965, the wing's B-52Fs were selected for modification under programs South Bay and Sun Bath. These modifications enabled the wing's bombers to double their bomb load from 24 to 48 750 lb bombs by the installation of external bomb racks. With these modifications, the wing's planes, along with those of the 7th Bombardment Wing were the first to deploy to Andersen Air Force Base, Guam and the first to fly Operation Arc Light bombing missions. The modified B-52Fs were the only SAC bombers to deploy for Arc Light missions until 1966, when the B-52Fs were replaced by B-52Ds with the Big Belly modification than enabled them to carry a larger and more varied bomb load.

The entire wing was drastically reduced from February to July 1965, from December 1965 to March 1966, and from June 1972 to October 1973, when all aircraft, crews, and most support personnel were loaned to other SAC units based at Andersen AFB Guam, U-Tapao Royal Thai Navy Airfield, Thailand and Kadena Air Base, Okinawa for operations in Southeast Asia.

Starting in 1972, the short-lived 3542d Operations Squadron conducted Convair T-29 pilot training for the Fifteenth Air Force, a number of T-29s and C-131s having been distributed throughout SAC as utility aircraft for various SAC wings and bases. This was done in conjunction with the 323d Flying Training Wing of the Air Training Command (ATC) at Mather, which also flew the T-29 in support the Undergraduate Navigator Training program. The 3542d Operations Squadron was inactivated the following year, in late 1973, concurrent with the retirement of the T-29 from UNT in late 1973 and early 1974 and its replacement with the Boeing 737-200 based T-43 Bobcat.

In the early 1980s, the 320th and the 441th were equipped to carry, and trained in the employment of, the US Navy's AGM-84 Harpoon missile and various types of anti-ship mines as part of a joint USN-USAF initiative to employ USAF bomber aircraft in maritime operations.

The 904th Air Refueling Squadron was inactivated 1 October 1986 and its older KC-135As modified to KC-135E standard and redistributed to other SAC units or sent to AMARC at Davis–Monthan Air Force Base, Arizona for storage. From this point forward, the 441 BS would rely on the Air Force Reserve's tenant 940th Air Refueling Group at Mather for local KC-135 support, or KC-135 and KC-10 support from other units in the western United States. As a result of the START I treaty with the Soviet Union and the associated mandated reductions in strategic bombers on both sides, the 441 BS with its B-52Gs was inactivated at Mather AFB on 30 September 1989. It was the first B-52G squadron to inactivate under the gradual drawdown of the B-52G fleet pursuant to START reductions of the entire USAF strategic bomber force.

Along with the 441st, the 320th Bombardment Wing was also inactivated on 30 September 1989 as the first B-52 wing to be inactivated in conjunction with the phased retirement of the B-52G fleet and was also made in conjunction with the pending closure of Mather AFB in 1993 due to a 1989 Base Realignment and Closure decision.

=== 320th Air Expeditionary Group (Air Combat Command) ===
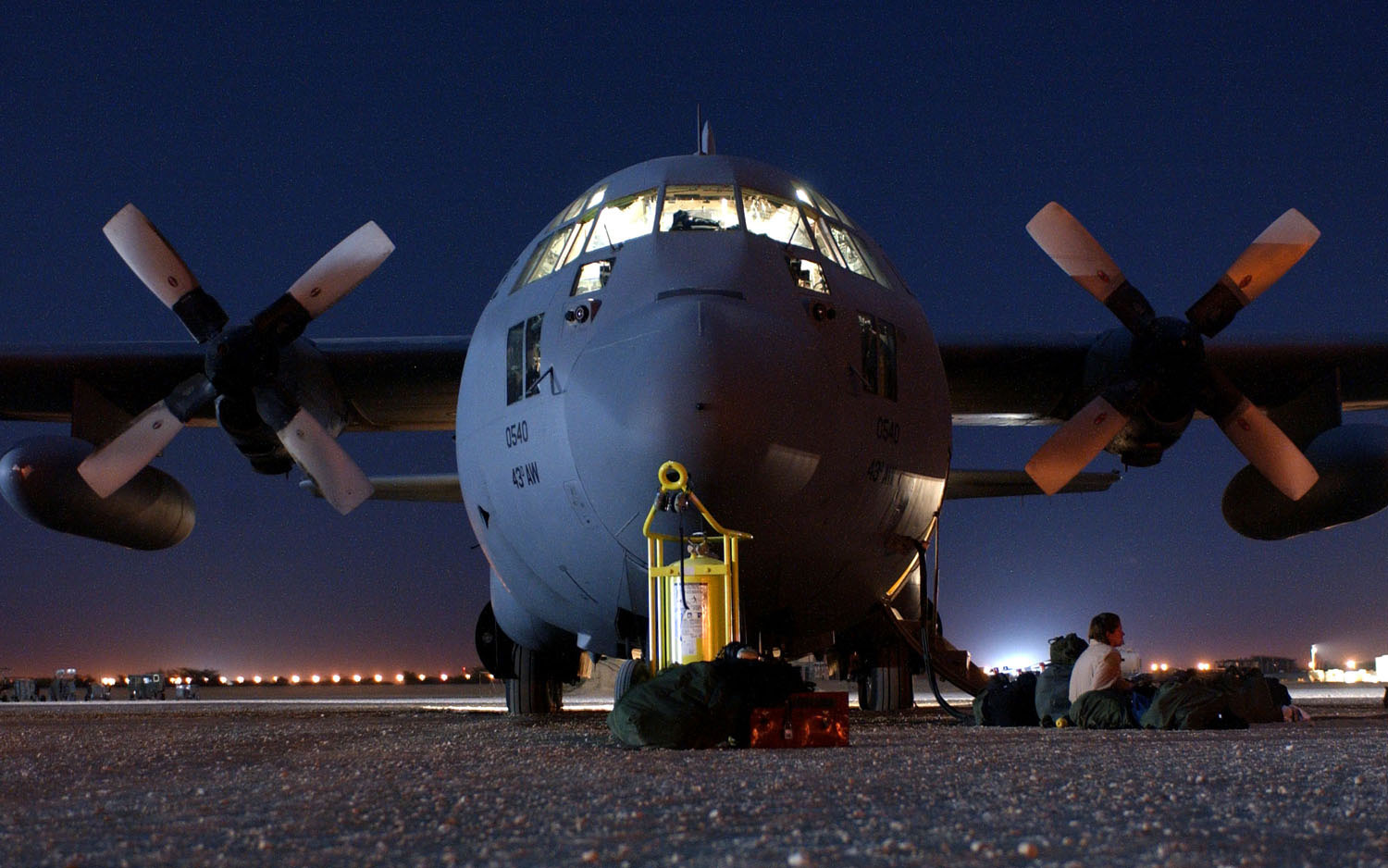
A C-130 Hercules, assigned to the 320th Air Expeditionary Wing at a forward-deployed location during Operation Enduring Freedom.

In 1998, the 320th was reactivated as the 320th Air Expeditionary Group (320 AEG) at Eskan Village, Riyadh, Kingdom of Saudi Arabia. As an element of U.S. Central Command Air Forces (USCENTAF) / Ninth Air Force, the 320th was a ground-based non-flying organization, replacing the earlier 4409th Air Base Group (Provisional). The 4409th Operational Support Wing (Provisional) had originally been established after the Iraqi invasion of Kuwait in 1990.

The primary mission of the 320th at Eskan was to provide liaison with Saudi Arabian Ministry of Defense and Aviation for Eskan Village and to provide host base support to the staff of Joint Task Force Southwest Asia (JTF-SWA) and the 9th Air and Space Expeditionary Task Force, including its associated Coalition Air Operations Center commanding all U.S. and Coalition combat flying units The 320th also supported the United States Military Training Mission - Saudi Arabia, the U.S. Office of the Program Manager, Saudi Arabian National Guard Modernization Program (OPM-SANG), as well as the Royal Air Force and French Air Force headquarters elements also located at Eskan Village.

"The 320th AEW moved American military power closer to . . . Afghanistan and Iraq by transporting eight divisions [sic - roughly eight divisions worth of troops at 10,000 personnel a division - around 80,000 troops] hauling some 47,000 tons of cargo, flying 17,000 sorties and logging 40,000 flying hours all while simultaneously supporting operations in 12 countries."

In 2005 the 320th Air Expeditionary Group was replaced by the 64th Air Expeditionary Group, a component of the 379th Air Expeditionary Wing.

=== 320th Air Expeditionary Wing (AF District of Washington) ===
The 320th was then renamed as the 320th Air Expeditionary Wing and was reassigned to the Air Force District of Washington at Bolling Air Force Base, District of Columbia. The Air Force District of Washington serves as the Air Force service component for coordination purposes to Joint Forces Headquarters National Capital Region. When the Joint Forces Headquarters transitions to become Joint Task Force National Capital Region, the 320th Air Expeditionary Wing activates and becomes the Air Force service component of the task force. Normally, the commander of the district serves as the commander of the wing. Examples of National Capital Region support duties have included supporting the inauguration of Barack Obama.

== Lineage ==
320th Bombardment Group

- Constituted as 320th Bombardment Group (Medium) on 19 June 1942

Activated on 23 June 1942
Redesignated 320th Bombardment Group, Medium on 31 August 1944
Inactivated on 4 December 1945
Redesignated 320th Bombardment Group, Light and allotted to the reserve.
Activated on 6 July 1947
Inactivated on 27 June 1949
Consolidated on 31 January 1984 with 320th Bombardment Wing as the 320th Bombardment Wing

320th Bombardment Wing

- Constituted as 320th Bombardment Wing, Medium and activated on 1 December 1952

Discontinued on 15 September 1960
Redesignated 320th Bombardment Wing, Heavy on 15 November 1962 and activated
Organized on 1 February 1963
Consolidated on 31 January 1984 with the 320th Bombardment Group
Inactivated 30 September 1989
Converted to provisional status, allotted to Air Combat Command to activate or inactivate at any time, and redesignated 320th Air Expeditionary Group on 19 November 1998

Activated on 1 December 1998
Inactivated on 1 December 2001

Redesignated 320th Air Expeditionary Wing on 1 February 2002 (Remained in provisional status)
Allotted to Air Force District of Washington in 2006 to activate or inactivate at any time.

Activated on 30 January 2006
Inactivated on 4 February 2006
Activated on 28 December 2006
Inactivated on 15 January 2007

Activated on 14 January 2008
Inactivated on 10 May 2010
Activated on 21 January 2011
Inactivated on 29 January 2011

Activated c. January 2012
Inactivated on 26 January 2012
Activated on 9 April 2012
Inactivated unknown

=== Assignments ===
- III Bomber Command, 23 June 1942
- XII Bomber Command, 14 September 1942
- 7th Fighter Wing (later 47th Bombardment Wing), 18 February 1943 (attached to Northwest African Strategic Air Force from May 1943)
- 2686th Medium Bombardment Wing (Provisional), 6 June 1943 (remained attached to Northwest African Strategic Air Force)
- 42d Bombardment Wing, 25 August 1943 (attached to Northwest African Strategic Air Force until September 1943)
- XV Bomber Command, 1 November 1943 – 30 December 1943
- XII Bomber Command, 1 January 1944 (attached to Mediterranean Allied Tactical Bomber Force until February 1944)
- 42d Bombardment Wing, 1 March 1944
- IX Air Force Service Command, 29 May 1945 – 20 November 1945 attached to 1st Air Disarmament Wing (Provisional) until 1 October 1945)
- Army Service Forces, Boston Port of Embarkation, 3 December 1945 – 4 December 1945
- 4th Bombardment Wing (later 4th Air Division), 9 June 1947 – 27 June 1949
- 12th Air Division, 1 December 1952 – 15 September 1960 (attached to 7th Air Division 3 June – 4 September 1954, 3d Air Division 5 October 1956 – 11 January 1957)
- Department of the Air Force, 16 September 1960 (not organized)
- Strategic Air Command, 15 November 1962 (not organized)
- 14th Strategic Aerospace Division, 1 February 1963
- 18th Strategic Aerospace Division, 1 July 1965
- 47th Air Division, 2 July 1966
- 14th Strategic Aerospace Division, 31 March 1970
- 47th Air Division, 30 June 1971
- 14th Air Division, 1 October 1972 – 30 September 1989
- Air Combat Command (inactive)
- 9th Air and Space Expeditionary Task Force (later 9th Aerospace Expeditionary Task Force SOUTHERN WATCH, 1 December 1998 – 1 December 2001
- Air Force District of Washington (inactive)

1st Aerospace Expeditionary Task Force NATIONAL CAPITAL REGION, 30 January 2006 – 4 February 2006
1st Aerospace Expeditionary Task Force NATIONAL CAPITAL REGION PRESIDENT FORD STATE FUNERAL, 28 December 2006 – 15 January 2007
1st Aerospace Expeditionary Task Force NATIONAL CAPITAL REGION, 14 January 2008 – 10 May 2010
1st Aerospace Expeditionary Task Force NATIONAL CAPITAL REGION, 21 January 2011 – 29 January 2011
1st Aerospace Expeditionary Task Force NATIONAL CAPITAL REGION, Unknown – 26 January 2012
1st Aerospace Expeditionary Task Force NATIONAL CAPITAL REGION, 9 April 2012 – unknown

=== Bases assigned ===
- MacDill Field, Florida, 23 June 1942
- Drane Field, Florida, 8–28 August 1942
- RAF Hethel (USAAF Station 114), England, 12 September 1942
- Oran Es Sénia Airport, Algeria, c. 2 December 1942
- Tafaraoui Airfield, Algeria, 28 January 1943
- Montesquieu Airfield, Algeria, April 1943
- Massicault Airfield, Tunisia, 29 June 1943
- El Bathan Airfield, Tunisia, 28 July 1943
- Decimomannu, Sardinia, 1 November 1943
- Alto, Corsica, c. 18 September 1944
- Dijon-Longvic Airfield (Y-9), France, 11 November 1944
- Dôle-Tavaux Airfield (Y-7), France, 1 April 1945
- Fliegerhorst Herzogenaurach (R-29), Germany, 18 June 1945
- Clastres Airfield (A-71), France, c. October–November 1945
- March Air Force Base, California, 1 December 1952 – 1 February 1963
- Mather Air Force Base, California, 1 February 1963 – 30 September 1989

Detachment 1 at Mountain Home Air Force Base, Idaho inactivated spring, 1975

- Eskan Village, Riyadh, Kingdom of Saudi Arabia, 1 December 1998 – 1 December 2001
- Doha International Airport ("Camp Snoopy") and Al Udeid Air Base, Qatar, 2001–2006
- Seeb International Airport, Oman
- Al Ain International Airport (Al Daftra AB), Abu Dhabi, UAE, undetermined dates
- Bolling Air Force Base, District of Columbia, 30 January 2006 – 4 February 2006
- Bolling Air Force Base, District of Columbia, 28 December 2006 – 15 January 2007
- Bolling Air Force Base, District of Columbia, 14 January 2008 – 10 May 2010
- Andrews Air Force Base, Maryland, 21 January 2011 – 29 January 2011
- unknown, c. January 2012 – 26 January 2012
- Andrews Air Force Base, Maryland, 9 April 2012 – unknown

=== Components ===
Group

- 320th Medical Group (later 320th Tactical Hospital, 320th Expeditionary Medical Flight, 320th Expeditionary Medical Group): 1 December 1952 – 1 January 1959, c. 1 December 1998 – c. 1 December 2001

Operational Squadrons

- 441st Bombardment Squadron: 23 June 1942 – 4 December 1945; 9 July 1947 – 27 June 1949; 1 December 1952 – 15 September 1960 (Not operational 16 May – 15 September 1960); 1 February 1963 – 30 September 1989 (Not operational 11 February – 1 July 1965; 1 December 1965 – 21 March 1966 and 3 June 1972 – 25 October 1973).
- 442d Bombardment Squadron: 23 June 1942 – 4 December 1945; 9 July 1947 – 27 June 1949; 1 December 1952 – 15 September 1960 (Not operational 1–15 September 1960)
- 443d Bombardment Squadron: 23 June 1942 – 4 December 1945; 9 July 1947 – 27 June 1949; 1 December 1952 – 15 September 1960 (Not operational 1–15 September 1960)
- 444th Bombardment Squadron: 23 June 1942 – 4 December 1945; 9 July 1947 – 27 June 1949; 1 January 1959 – 15 September 1960 (Not operational 1 July – 15 September 1960)
- 320th Refueling Squadron: 1 December 1952 – 16 June 1960
- 904th Air Refueling Squadron: 1 February 1963 – 30 September 1989

Support Squadrons

- 49th Munitions Maintenance Squadron: 1 February 1963 – 1 October 1972
- 320th Airborne Missile Maintenance Squadron: 1 February 1963 – 30 September 1975
- 320th Armament & Electronics Maintenance Squadron (later 320th Avionics Maintenance Squadron): 1 December 1952 – 16 June 1960, 1 February 1963 – 30 September 1989
- 320th Expeditionary Communications Squadron: c. 1 December 1998 – 1 December 2001
- 320th Expeditionary Civil Engineer Squadron: c. 1 December 1998 – c. 1 December 2001
- 320th Expeditionary Logistics Squadron: c. 1 December 1998 – c. 1 December 2001
- 320th Expeditionary Services Squadron: c. 1 December 1998 – c. 1 December 2001
- 320th Field Maintenance Squadron (later 320th Expeditionary Maintenance Squadron): 1 December 1952 – 16 June 1960, 1 February 1963 – 30 September 1989, c. 18 October 2001 – c. 1 December 2001
- 320th Munitions Maintenance Squadron: 1 October 1972 – 30 September 1989
- 320th Periodic Maintenance Squadron (later 320th Organizational Maintenance Squadron): 1 December 1952 – 16 June 1960, 1 February 1963 – 30 September 1989
- 320th Combat Defense Squadron (later 320th Security Police Squadron, 320th Expeditionary Security Forces Squadron): 1 February 1963 – 30 September 1989, c. 1 December 1998 – c. 1 December 2001

=== Major aircraft types operated ===
- Martin B-26 Marauder (1942–1945)
- Boeing B-29 Superfortress (1952–1953)
- Boeing B-47 Stratojet (1953–1960)
- Boeing B-52F Stratofortress (1963–1968)

Boeing B-52G Stratofortress (1968–1989)

- Boeing KC-135 Stratotanker (1963–1989)
- Lockheed C-130 Hercules (2001–2006)

== See also ==
- David Wade
- List of B-29 Superfortress operators
- List of B-47 units of the United States Air Force
- List of B-52 Units of the United States Air Force
- List of MAJCOM wings of the United States Air Force
