= El Bathan Airfield =

Abandoned World War II military airfield in Tunisia

El Bathan Airfield
- Part of Twelfth Air Force

Site information
- Type: Military airfield
- Controlled by: United States Army Air Forces

Location
- Coordinates: 36°41′10.69″N 009°50′20.25″E

Site history
- Built: 1943
- In use: 1943

Location of El Bathan Airfield, Tunisia

El Bathan Airfield is an abandoned World War II military airfield in Ariana province, Tunisia, located approximately 15 km south of El Battan, and 30 km west of Tunis. It is now an agricultural area, with little or no visible remains. A light scar on the landscape indicates where its main runway was located. During World War II it was used by the United States Army Air Force Twelfth Air Force during the North African Campaign.

== History ==
The airfield was a temporary facility, constructed by the United States Army Corps of Engineers in June and July 1943. It consisted of a Pierced Steel Planking runway and parking apron, with hard earth dispersal hardstands. Six-man tents were used for billeting, lined up in rows with the orderly room and the mess hall at one end. The airfield was called the "Dust Bowl" by the men stationed there, given the hot, dry winds that would constantly blow airborne dust into the tents, aircraft and the support facilities.

- 320th Bombardment Group, Martin B-26 Marauder, 28 July-1 November 1943
- 14th Fighter Group, Lockheed P-38 Lightning, 3 June-25 July 1943

By late October 1943 the front had advanced to the point where the 320th found itself almost out of range of targets, and its squadrons were ordered to move to new airfields on Sardinia. Afterward, the airfield was dismantled and the land returned to its owners.
