= Borj El Amri Airport =

Airport in Tunisia

Borj El Amri Airport مطار برج العامري
- IATA: N/A; ICAO: DTTI

Summary
- Airport type: Public
- Operator: Government of Tunisia
- Serves: Borj El Amri
- Elevation AMSL: 108 ft / 33 m
- Coordinates: 36°43′16″N 09°56′35″E

Map
- Location in Tunisia

Runways
Direction	Length		Surface
Direction	m	ft	Surface
13/31	1,050	3,445	Asphalt
- Source: DAFIF

Borj El Amri Airport (ICAO: DTTI) is a small airport near Borj El Amri, a city in the Manouba Governorate of Tunisia. The airport is located 23 kilometres (14 mi) southwest of Tunis and has a functional asphalt runway. The airport is used as a training site for the Aviation School of Borj El Amri, belonging to the Tunisian Ministry of Defense.

== World War II ==
During World War II, the airport was known as Massicault Airfield and was used by the United States Army Air Forces Twelfth Air Force during the North African Campaign. Known units assigned were:

- 2d Bombardment Group, 31 Jul-2 Dec 1943, Boeing B-17 Flying Fortress
- 320th Bombardment Group, 29 Jun-28 Jul 1943, Martin B-26 Marauder
- 68th Reconnaissance Group, Oct-Nov 1943, Lockheed F-4/F-5 Lightning

== See also ==
- Boeing B-17 Flying Fortress airfields in the Mediterranean Theater of Operations
