= 443d Air Expeditionary Squadron =

443d Air Expeditionary Squadron

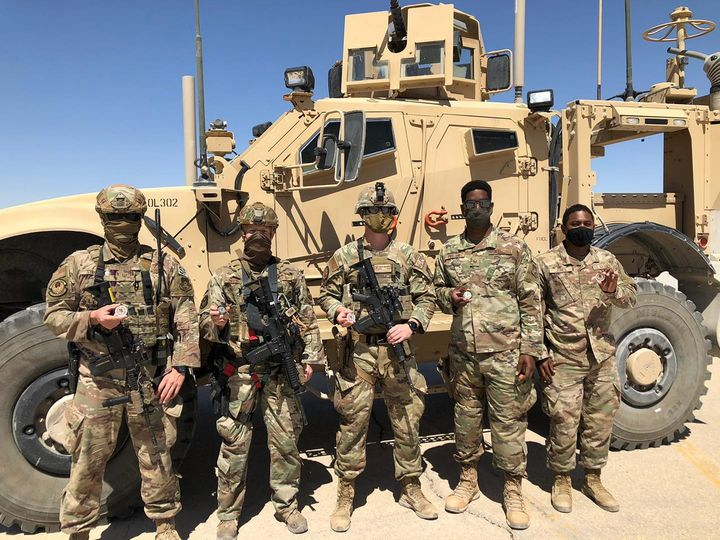
- Members of the 443d Air Expeditionary Squadron
- Active: 1942–1945}1947–1949; 1952–1960; c. 15 June 2016–present
- Country: United States
- Branch: United States Air Force
- Role: Expeditionary support
- Part of: Air Combat Command
- Motto: Resurget Ex Favilla (Latin for 'Rising from the Ashes')
- Engagements: Mediterranean Theater of Operations
- Decorations: Distinguished Unit Citation; Air Force Meritorious Unit Award; French Croix de Guerre with Palm

Insignia
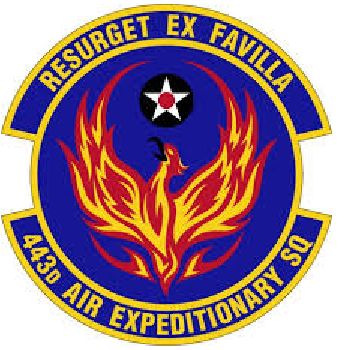
- 443 Air Expeditionary Squadron emblem

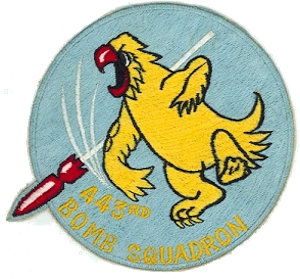
- 443d Bombardment Squadron emblem (Note: Approved 4 March 1954. Description: On a blue disc a caricature of an angry yellow parrot with red beak and black and white eyes, hurling a red bomb across the lower left edge of the disc and leaving white speed lines.)

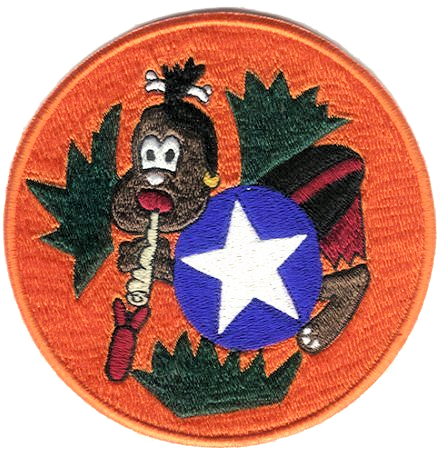
- 443d Bombardment Squadron emblem (World War II)

The 443d Air Expeditionary Squadron is a provisional United States Air Force unit. Its last assignment as a regular Air Force unit was to the 320th Bombardment Wing at March Air Force Base, California, where it was inactivated on 15 September 1960.

The squadron was first activated during World War II as the 443d Bombardment Squadron. It served in combat in the Mediterranean Theater of Operations, where it earned two Distinguished Unit Citations and the French Croix de Guerre with Palm. After V-E Day, the squadron returned to the United States for inactivation.

Although briefly active in the reserve from 1947 to 1949, the squadron was primarily a Strategic Air Command bomber unit with Boeing B-47 Stratojets. The squadron was inactivated in 1960, in connection with the phasing out of the B-47.

== History ==
=== World War II ===
==== Initial organization and training in the United States ====
The squadron was first established at MacDill Field, Florida on 1 July 1942 as the 443d Bombardment Squadron, one of the four original squadrons of the 320th Bombardment Group, a Martin B-26 Marauder medium bomber group. The squadron trained rapidly in Florida, completing Phase I (individual) Operational Training at MacDill and Phase II (aircrew) Operational Training at Drane Field until beginning to move its aircraft to England in August without starting Phase III (unit) training.

The air echelon departed for Baer Field, Indiana on 19 August with initial plans calling for the squadron's air echelon to move to Europe via the North Atlantic Ferrying Route. At Baer Field, it received B-26s direct from the factory. However, these planes were soon withdrawn and transferred to the 319th Bombardment Group, the first B-26 group to fly its bombers across the Atlantic. (Note: The 319th Bombardment Group suffered several losses on its ferry flight, as winter weather began to impact the northern ferry route and planes were delayed for weather or aircraft malfunctions. As a result, beginning with the 320th Group, further deployments of B-26 units to Europe travelled over the South Atlantic route, Freeman, pp. 15, 55.) The air echelon continued training at Baer Field with the few Marauders it had remaining. After delays continuing to November, it moved to Morrison Field, Florida to begin ferrying its planes using the South Atlantic Ferrying Route.

The ground echelon of the squadron, meanwhile, departed the United States on the RMS Queen Mary on 5 September, arriving at RAF Hethel on 12 September, and moving to RAF Tibenham at the beginning of October. In England, it received additional training from units of Eighth Air Force. It departed for North Africa on 21 November 1942. The air echelon never conducted operations from England, with their Marauders arriving in North Africa between December 1942 and January 1943.

==== Combat in the Mediterranean Theater ====
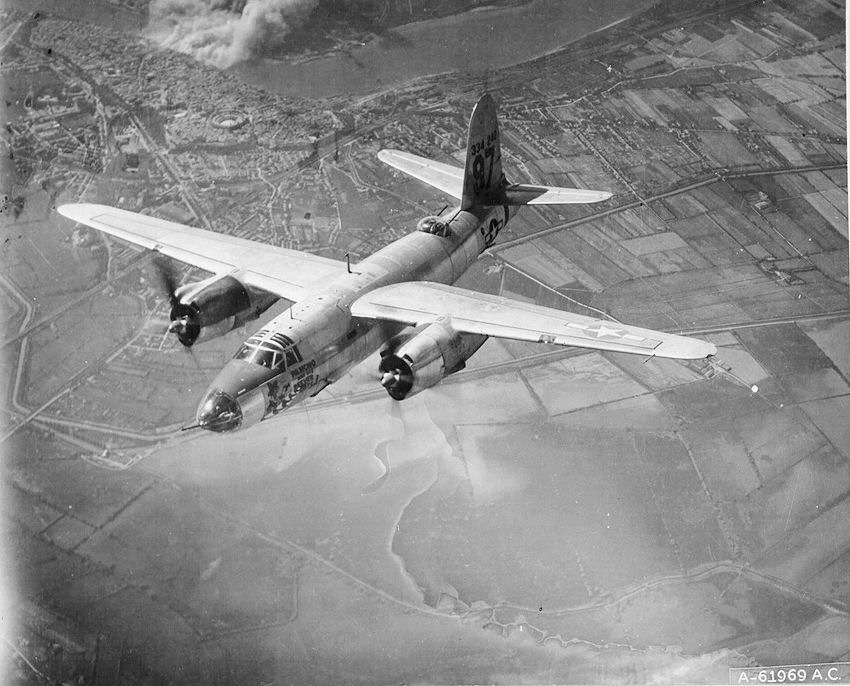
320th Group B-26 Marauder after attacking a bridge over the Rhone River near Arles (Note: Aircraft is Martin B-26G-5-MA Marauder, serial 43-34240. This aircraft was hit by German flak and exploded while attacking a roadblock near Covigliano, Italy on 23 August 1944. There were no survivors reported, though three parachutes were reported. Missing Aircrew Report 7997.)

The squadron and its aircraft arrived at its first true overseas station, Oran Es Sénia Airport, Algeria, in early January 1943. The squadron had mine dropping equipment installed on its bomb racks for attacks against enemy submarines. The squadron was withdrawn from antisubmarine combat in February for rest and the antisubmarine mission was transferred to the Royal Air Force. However, it did not fly its first bombing missions until April 1943, by which time it had moved to Montesquieu Airfield, Algeria from its training base at Tafaraoui Airfield, Algeria. Until July 1943, operating from bases in Algeria and Tunisia, it flew missions against enemy shipping on the approaches to Tunis It flew missions against Tunisia and participated in Operation Corkscrew, the projected invasion of Pantelleria. The following month it provided air support for Operation Husky, the invasion of Sicily.

The squadron bombed marshalling yards. bridges airfields, road junctions, viaducts, harbors, fuel and supply dumps, defense positions and other targets in Italy. It supported Operation Avalanche, the landings near Salerno, on the Italian mainland, and knocked out targets to aid the seizure of Naples and to cross the Volturno River. It flew missions against Anzio and Monte Cassino and flew interdiction missions in central Italy in preparation for the Allied approach to Rome.

In November 1943, the squadron moved to Decimomannu Airfield on Sardinia to be better positioned to attack targets in central and northern Italy. Its efforts supporting preparations for and execution of the Allied offensive in central Italy in April through June 1944, including the French breathrough of the Gustav Line, earned the squadron a French Croix de Guerre with Palm. On 12 May 1944, in the face of an intense antiaircraft artillery barrage, it bombed enemy troop concentrations near Fondi supporting United States Fifth Army's advance on Rome, for which it was awarded a Distinguished Unit Citation (DUC). From June to November 1944, it flew interdiction missions in the Po Valley.

==== Combat in northern Europe and inactivation ====
After the Allies carried out Operation Dragoon, the invasion of southern France, in August 1944, the squadron flew air support missions there, moving to Dijon-Longvic Airfield, France in November. It bombed bridges, railroads, gun positions, barracks, supply and munitions dumps and other targets in France and Germany until V-E Day. Near the end of the war, on 15 March 1945, the squadron bombed pillboxes, weapons pits, trenches and roads within the Siegfried Line to enable the breakthrough of the United States Seventh Army, for which it was awarded a second DUC.

Following the end of the war, the squadron moved to AAF Station Fürth, Germany, where it took part in Operation Eclipse, the air disarmament campaign, acting as teams to disband the Luftwaffe, and packing its most advanced equipment for shipment back to the US, until the fall, when it moved to France to prepare for return to the US. It departed Europe in November 1945 and was inactivated on its arrival at the Port of Embarkation in December.

=== Service in the reserves ===
The 443d was reactivated as a reserve unit under Air Defense Command (ADC) at Mitchel Field, New York in July 1947 as a light bomber unit. At Mitchel, its training was supervised by the 113th AAF Base Unit (later the 2230th Air Force Reserve Training Center). It does not appear the squadron was fully staffed or equipped with any operational aircraft during this time. In 1948 Continental Air Command assumed responsibility for managing reserve and Air National Guard units from ADC. The 443d was inactivated when Continental Air Command reorganized its reserve units under the wing base organization system in June 1949. The squadron's personnel continuing in paid reserve status and its equipment were transferred to elements of the 84th Fighter Wing.

=== Strategic Air Command operations ===
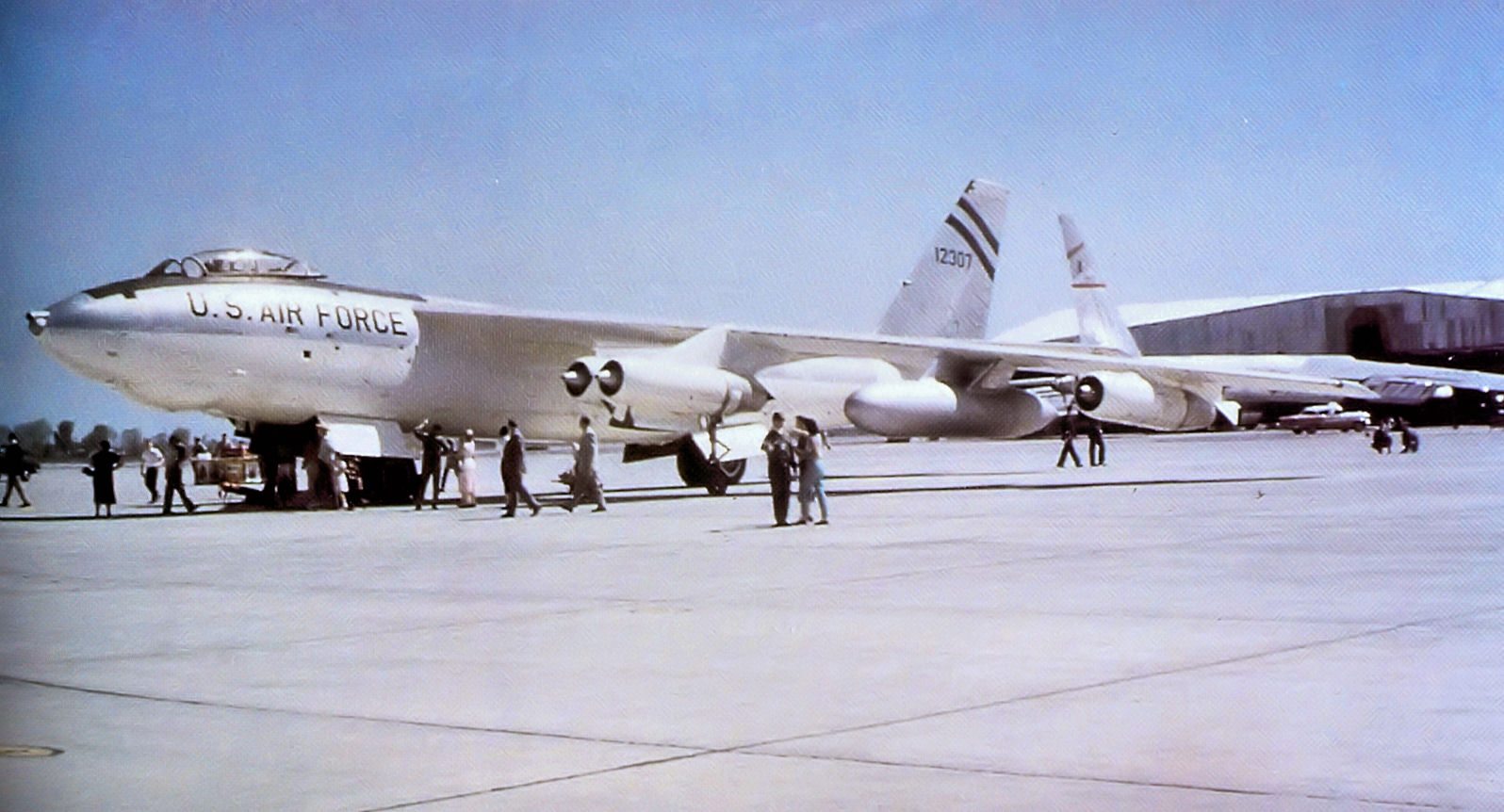
320th Bombardment Wing B-47 Stratojet (Note: Aircraft is Boeing B-47B-50-BW Stratojet, serial 51-2307. This aircraft was retired to the Military Aircraft Storage and Disposition Center on 2 September 1960. It is now on display outside Grissom Air Reserve Base, Indiana, but carries the marking of another plane. Baugher, Joe (4 October 2023). "1951 USAF Serial Numbers". Joe Baugher.)

During the Korean War, the 106th Bombardment Wing, a New York Air National Guard unit, was mobilized and assigned to Strategic Air Command (SAC). It trained at March Air Force Base, California as a Boeing B-29 Superfortress wing. On 1 December 1952, the 106th Wing was returned to state control and replaced by the 320th Bombardment Wing. In connection with this change, the 443d was reactivated, and took over the personnel and Superfortresses of the 135th Bombardment Squadron, which was simultaneously inactivated. (Note: Despite being numbered in the series reserved for Air National Guard units (101-299), and unlike the 106th Wing's other two B-29 bomber units, the 135th was not an Air National Guard unit. It had served during World War II as the 74th Bombardment Squadron and was always a regular squadron.) Under SAC's new organization, the squadron reported directly to the new wing, and the 320th Group remained inactive. (Note: Although the 320th Wing was a new organization, it later continued, through temporary bestowal, the history, and honors of the 320th Bombardment Group. This temporary bestowal ended in January 1984, when the wing and group were consolidated into a single unit.)

In early 1953, the squadron began to replace its B-29s with Boeing B-47B Stratojets. For a while the service test model of the reconnaissance version of this new jet bomber, the YRB-47, was on the squadron's strength. In December, the squadron began training the cadre of B-47 aircrews for the 96th Bombardment Wing, which had been activated at Altus Air Force Base with only minimum manning as that station was being reopened. This training continued for a little more than a year.

In June 1954, the squadron, along with the entire 320th Wing, deployed as a unit to RAF Brize Norton remaining there until September. It repeated this performance at Andersen Air Force Base, Guam between September 1956 and January 1957. Later in 1957, overseas alert operations changed in character when overseas alert began to be supported by multiple wings, with individuals rotating home during an extended overseas Operation Reflex alert, rather than deploying an entire wing overseas as a unit. Reflex placed Stratojets and Boeing KC-97 Stratofreighters at bases closer to the Soviet Union.

The percentage of SAC planes on alert gradually grew over the next three years to reach its goal of 1/3 of SAC’s force on alert by 1960. From 1958, SAC's B-47 Stratojet squadrons began to assume an alert posture at their home bases, reducing the amount of time spent on alert at overseas bases. This was designed to meet General Thomas S. Power’s initial goal of maintaining one third of SAC’s planes on fifteen minute ground alert, fully fueled and ready for combat to reduce vulnerability to a Soviet missile strike.

However, SAC was relying on the longer range Boeing B-52 Stratofortress, deciding to reduce the number of B-47 wings at March Air Force Base from two to one. With this reduction, the 443d was inactivated on 15 September 1960.

=== Expeditionary operations ===
The squadron was converted to provisional status and redesignated the 443d Air Expeditionary Squadron on 13 May 2011 and assigned to Air Combat Command to activate or inactivate as needed. It was activated by 15 June 2016 to support Operation Inherent Resolve. In November 2018 "[a]s the fight against ISIS continue[d] in the border region between Iraq and Syria, security forces defenders from the 443rd Air Expeditionary Squadron integrated with Iraqi Security Forces and other coalition partners to launch the first joint base defense exercise at Al Asad Air Base, Iraq. 443d airmen deliver combat support through airfield management, cargo processing and personnel movement. In June 2021, the squadron began operating Erbil Air Base, Iraq in addition, when the 442nd Air Expeditionary Squadron, which had been operating the base independently, was inactivated.

Airmen deployed to the unit are required to perform in multiple skill areas, not only their specialties to keep the base running with the smallest number of personnel. The unit was active as late as March 2024.

== Lineage ==
- Constituted as the 443d Bombardment Squadron (Medium) on 19 June 1942

Activated on 1 July 1942
Redesignated 443d Bombardment Squadron, Medium on 9 October 1944
Inactivated on 6 December 1945

Redesignated 443d Bombardment Squadron, Light on 26 May 1947

Activated in the reserve on 9 July 1947
Inactivated on 27 June 1949
Redesignated 443d Bombardment Squadron, Medium and activated, on 1 December 1952
Discontinued on 15 September 1960
Redesignated 443d Air Expeditionary Squadron and converted to provisional status on 13 May 2011
Activated c. 15 June 2016

=== Assignments ===
- 320th Bombardment Group, 1 July 1942 – 4 December 1945
- 320th Bombardment Group, 9 July 1947 – 27 June 1949
- 320th Bombardment Wing, 1 December 1952 – 15 September 1960
- Air Combat Command to activate or inactivate at any time after 13 May 2011

- 386th Air Expeditionary Wing, c. 15 June 2016 – present

=== Stations ===
- MacDill Field, Florida, 1 July 1942
- Drane Field, Florida, 8–28 August 1942
- RAF Hethel (AAF-114), England, 12 September 1942
- RAF Tibenham (AAF-124), England, 1 October 1942
- Oran Es Sénia Airport, Algeria, 9 January 1943
- Tafaraoui Airfield, Algeria, 28 January 1943
- Montesquieu Airfield, Algeria, 14 April 1943
- Massicault Airfield, Tunisia, 29 June 1943
- El Bathan Airfield, Tunisia, 28 July 1943
- Decimomannu Airfield, Sardinia, Italy, 9 November 1943
- Alto Airfield, Corsica, France, 20 September 1944
- Dijon-Longvic Airfield (Y-9), France, 11 November 1944
- Dôle-Tavaux Airfield (Y-7), France, 2 April 1945
- AAF Station Fürth (R-28), Germany (R-28), 20 June 1945
- Clastres Airfield (A-71), France, October-27 November 1945
- Camp Shanks, New York, 4–6 December 1945
- Mitchel Field, New York, 9 July 1947 – 27 June 1949
- March Air Force Base, California, 1 December 1952 – 15 September 1960
- Al Asad Air Base, Iraq, c. 15 June 2016 – present

=== Aircraft ===
- Martin B-26 Marauder, 1942–1945
- Boeing B-29 Superfortress, 1952–1953
- Boeing YRB-47B Stratojet, 1953
- Boeing B-47 Stratojet, 1953–1960

=== Awards and campaigns ===
Award streamer	Award	Dates	Notes
	Distinguished Unit Citation	12 May 1944	Italy, 443d Bombardment Squadron
	Distinguished Unit Citation	15 March 1945	Germany, 443d Bombardment Squadron
	Air Force Meritorious Unit Award	15 June 2016–14 June 2017	443d Air Expeditionary Squadron
	Air Force Meritorious Unit Award	25 August 2018–14 June 2019	443d Air Expeditionary Squadron
	Air Force Meritorious Unit Award	15 June 2018–29 April 2019	443d Air Expeditionary Squadron
	Air Force Meritorious Unit Award	15 July 2018–12 October 2018	443d Air Expeditionary Squadron
	Air Force Meritorious Unit Award	1 May 2019–5 May 2020	443d Air Expeditionary Squadron
	Air Force Meritorious Unit Award	1 July 2020–1 April 2021	443d Air Expeditionary Squadron
	Air Force Meritorious Unit Award	1 April 2020–10 June 2021	443d Air Expeditionary Squadron
	French Croix de Guerre with Palm	April, May, and June 1944	443d Bombardment Squadron

Campaign Streamer	Campaign	Dates	Notes
	Tunisia	9 January 1943 – 13 May 1943	443d Bombardment Squadron
	Antisubmarine, EAME Theater	9 January 1943 – April 1943	443d Bombardment Squadron
	Air Combat, EAME Theater	9 January 1943 – 11 May 1945	443d Bombardment Squadron
	Sicily	14 May 1943 – 17 August 1943	443d Bombardment Squadron
	Naples-Foggia	18 August 1943 – 21 January 1944	443d Bombardment Squadron
	Anzio	22 January 1944 – 24 May 1944	443d Bombardment Squadron
	Rome-Arno	22 January 1944 – 9 September 1944	443d Bombardment Squadron
	Southern France	15 August 1944 – 14 September 1944	443d Bombardment Squadron
	North Apennines	10 September 1944 – 11 November 1944	443d Bombardment Squadron
	Northern France	25 July 1944 – 14 September 1944	443d Bombardment Squadron
	Rhineland	11 November 1944 – 21 March 1945	443d Bombardment Squadron
	Central Europe	22 March 1944 – 21 May 1945	443d Bombardment Squadron

== See also ==
- List of Martin B-26 Marauder operators
- List of B-29 Superfortress operators
- List of B-47 units of the United States Air Force
