= Hadji Girl =

Song about Iraq War

"Hadji Girl" is a song by Corporal Joshua Belile of the United States Marine Corps about a fictitious encounter with a family of Iraqis. A video of Belile performing the song was posted anonymously on YouTube.com in March 2006. It sparked controversy at a time when Marines were facing public scrutiny over the killings in Haditha. YouTube subsequently removed the video from their site, rejecting any further uploaded versions as violating the site's terms of use.

In the song, the Marine protagonist comes under fire and takes cover in a nearby Burger King where he meets an Iraqi girl who convinces him to follow her to her house. After arriving, the Marine is confronted by the Iraqi girl's father and brother who are armed with AK-47 rifles. The Marine then uses the girl's younger sister as a human shield. The father and brother attack, killing the sister, as the Marine laughs maniacally. The Marine then hides behind a TV, returns fire, and kills the father and brother. Cheers and clapping from the unseen audience can be heard in the background of the video.

Belile later said the song was meant only as a joke based on lines from the film Team America: World Police, and apologized to those who were offended by its content. The performance, according to Belile, was at Al Asad airbase in Iraq, where Belile's helicopter gunship unit was posted until March 2006.

== Recording deal ==
Shortly after the controversy began, many right-wing bloggers and radio hosts went to the defense of the Belile: furthermore, talk show host Mike Church planned to record and release the song. While Belile was not to be part of the recording originally because of his commitment to the military, Church indicated that he would still receive royalties from sales.

Further reports indicated that Cpl. Joshua Belile planned to record Hadji Girl with Hits Music Studios, and the right-wing talk program The Mike Church Show planned to be the first to air it, said Jimm Mosher & Alan Grossman, co-owners of the North Carolina studio. These plans were later shelved. Mosher said Belile still plans to record the song. Belile has said he will leave the military when his five-year enlistment ends in October 2007. "We're wanting to record and produce it," Mosher said. "I think it tells a great story."
