= Al-Asad Airbase =

Airbase located in Al Anbar Governorate, Iraq

Al-Asad Airbase Qadisiyah Airbase
- Al Anbar Governorate in Iraq

Site information
- Owner: Ministry of Defence
- Operator: Iraqi Air Force

Location
- Location within Iraq Location within Middle East Location within Asia
- Coordinates: 33°48′N 42°26′E

Site history
- Built: 1975
- In use: 1975–present

Airfield information
- Identifiers: IATA: IQA, ICAO: ORAA, LID: MAA
- Elevation: 188 metres (617 ft) AMSL
Runways
Direction	Length and surface
09R/27L	3,990 metres (13,091 ft) asphalt
09L/27R	3,990 metres (13,091 ft) asphalt
08/26	3,090 metres (10,138 ft) packed dirt
- Other airfield facilities: ILS planned in 2016

Al-Asad Airbase, previously Qadisiyah Airbase (IATA: IQA, ICAO: ORAA) is an Iraqi airbase located in Anbar governorate.

It was the second-largest US military airbase in Iraq during Operation Iraqi Freedom. Until January 2010, it was the home of the II Marine Expeditionary Force/Multinational Force West. Other major tenants have included the 3rd ID's 4th IBCT, 82nd Airborne Division Advise & Assist Brigade, 332nd Medical Brigade, 321st Sustainment Brigade, Vertical Onboard Delivery Detachment-1 (VOD-1), VAQ-141, Navy Customs Battalion Juliet, elements of the Iraqi Army's 7th Division, and the United States Air Force (USAF).

On 26 December 2018, President Donald Trump and his wife Melania visited the soldiers stationed at the base. On 23 November 2019, Vice President Mike Pence and his wife Karen visited the troops ahead of Thanksgiving. On 8 January 2020, the air base came under an Iranian ballistic missile attack in retaliation for the killing of Quds Force leader Qasem Soleimani in a U.S. drone strike a few days earlier.

Following the end of the military mission of the US-led 'global coalition against Daesh', the withdrawal of US troops from Al-Asad base began in September 2025. The responsibility for securing and closing Al-Asad Airbase in Iraq fell to the 1st Battalion, 194th Field Artillery Regiment, 2nd Brigade Combat Team, 34th Infantry Division, Iowa Army National Guard. The withdrawal concluded in January 2026, with the Iraqi armed forces assuming full control of the base.

== Geography ==
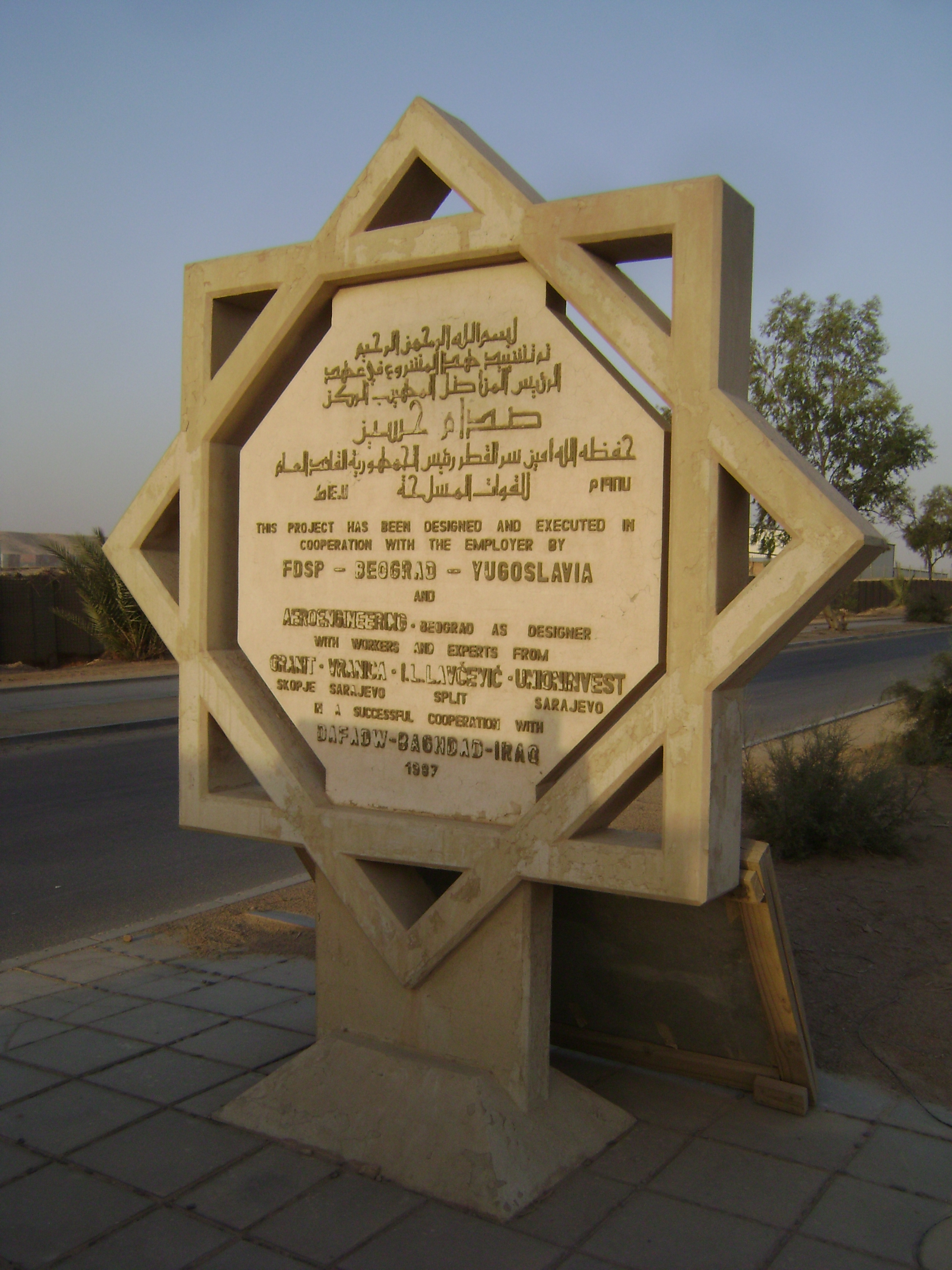
Plaque commemorating the completion of Qadisiyah AB in 1987

The sprawling base is located within the districts of Haditha and Hīt of the largely Sunni Al Anbar Governorate, about 100 miles (160 km) west of Baghdad and 5 miles (8.0 km) west of the village of Khan al-Baghdadi.

The airbase is divided by Wādī al Asadī (وادي الاسدي), a wadi whose course passes through the oasis along the base's western edge and then continues eastward, emptying into the Euphrates River at Khan al Baghdadi. This oasis is locally referred to as "Abraham's Well".

The ‘Ayn al Asad spring surfaces within the base and flows into the Wādī al Asadī. Geologically, the base resides in the Al-Ḥammād sector of the Syrian Desert, composed mostly of a rock and gravel steppe.

== History ==
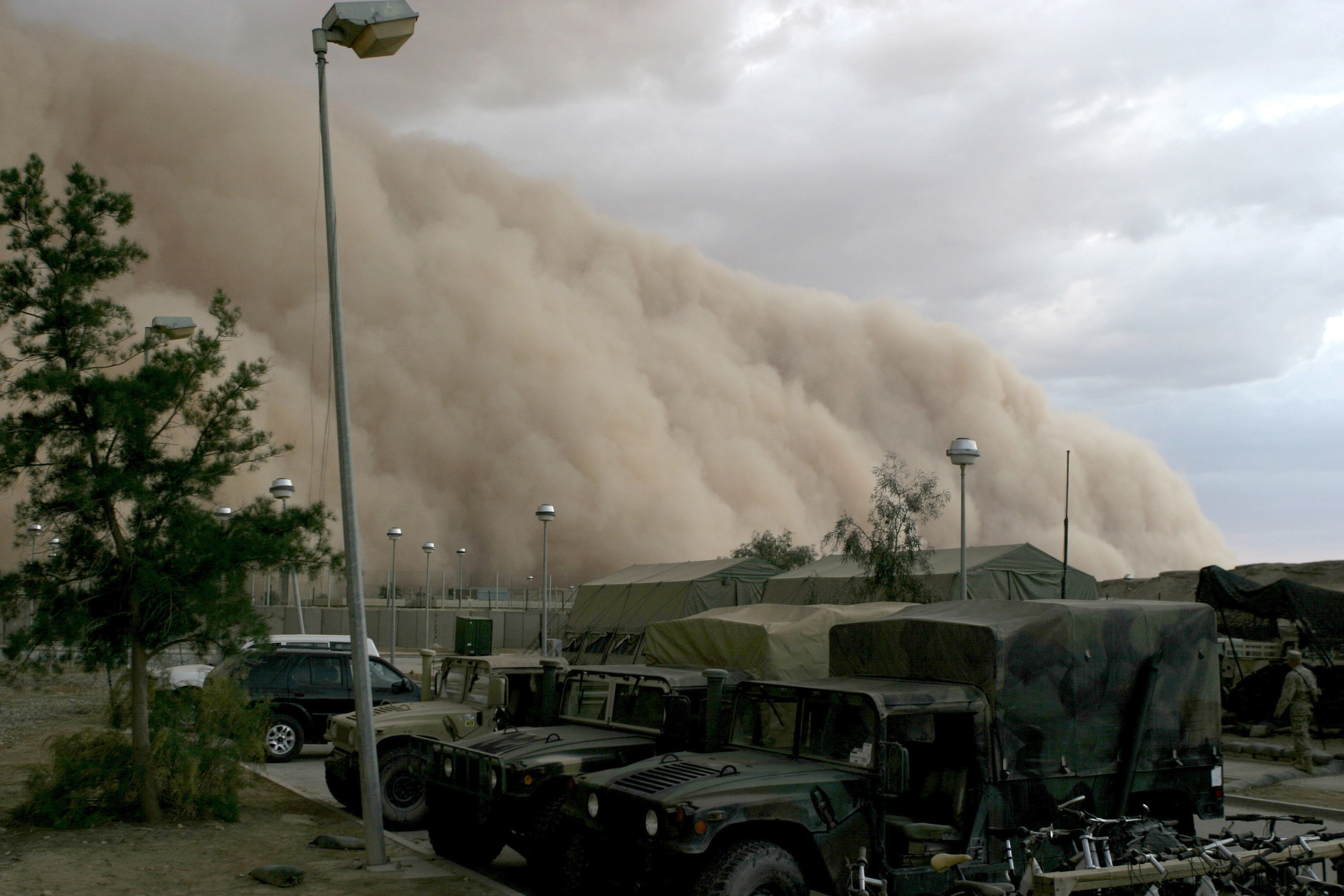
A haboob engulfs Al Asad in 2005.

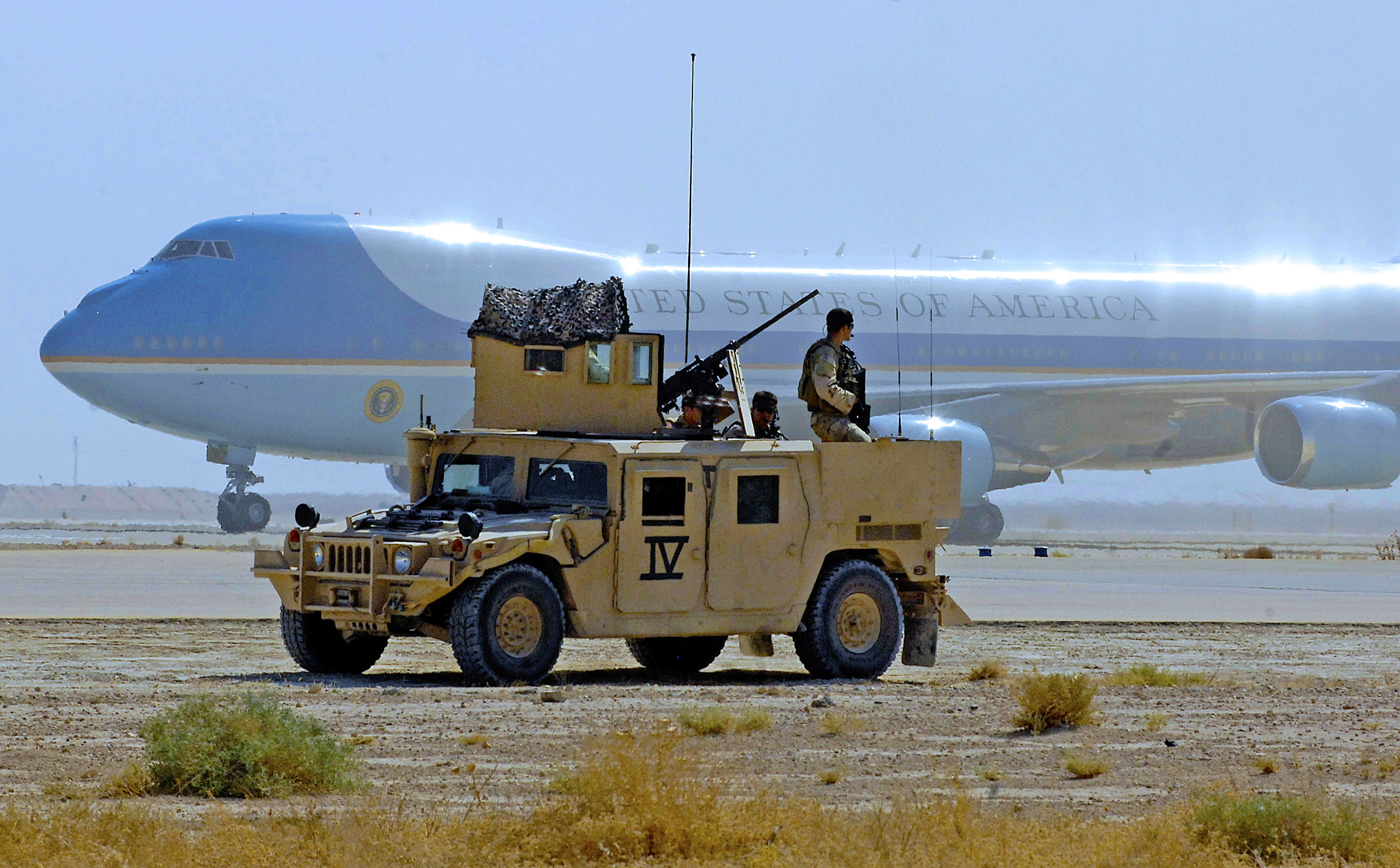
A U.S. Navy SEAL team helps secure the airfield as Air Force One lands at Al Asad with President George W. Bush on board, 3 September 2007.

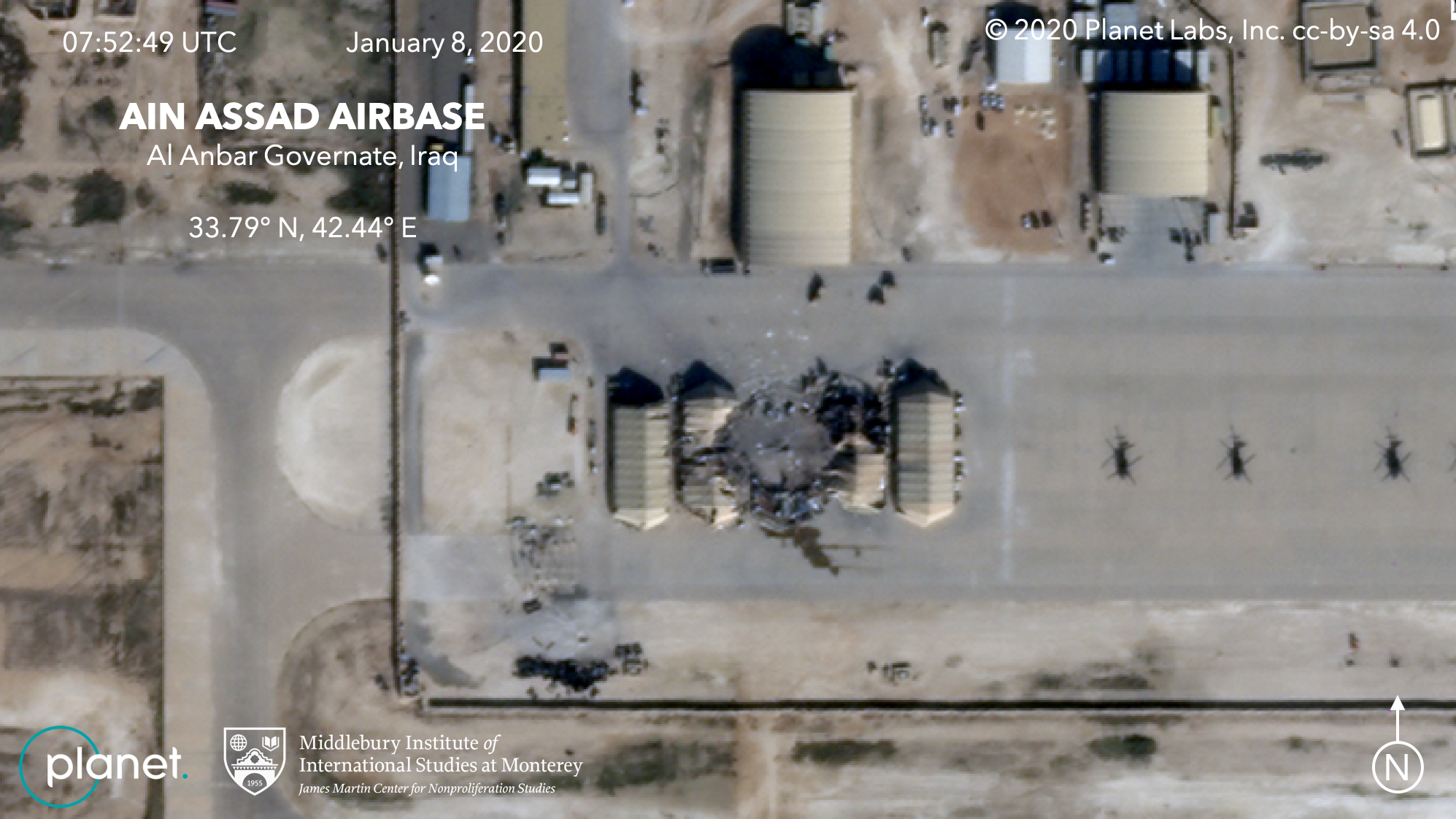
Ballistic missile damage to a hangar at Al Asad, January 2020

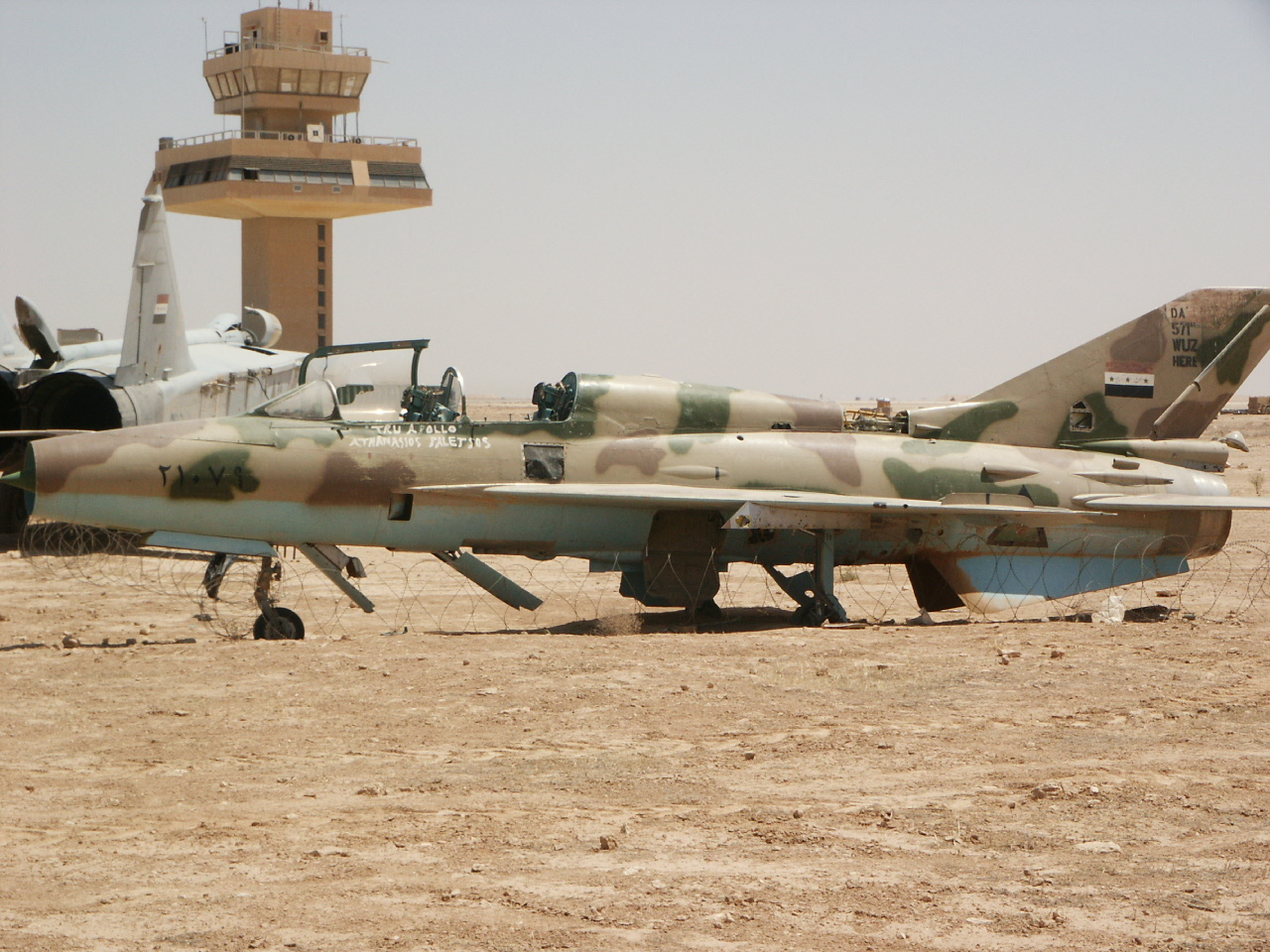
Abandoned Iraqi Air Force J-7 aircraft in front of the Al Asad Airbase ATC Tower

=== Qadisiyah Airbase ===
The base was originally named Qadisiyah Airbase (قاعدة القادسية الجوية), a reference to the Battle of al-Qādisiyyah (c. 636). Qadisiyah AB was one of five new air bases built in Iraq as part of their Project "Super-Base", launched in 1975 as a response to the lessons learned during the Arab-Israeli wars of 1967 and 1973.

The base was built sometime between 1981 and 1987 by a consortium of Yugoslav companies under contract to the government of Iraq. Two Yugoslav government agencies led the project. The FDSP (Federal Directorate of Supply and Procurement) acted as the project manager and Aeroengineering acted as the project engineer. Known as 'Project 202-B' and 'Project 1100', the companies involved in its construction included Granit, Vranica d.d. Sarajevo, I.L. Lavčević d.d. Split, and Unioninvest d.d. Sarajevo.

The US$280,000,000 project at Qadisiyah AB included accommodation for 5,000 personnel and the necessary infrastructure including public facilities (mosques, outdoor and indoor Olympic-size swimming pools, football field, sports hall, cinema, library, elementary school, high school, hospital and clinic) and fortified military facilities (military airport, shelters for personnel and equipment, shelters for bombers and fighters and military barracks). The hardened aircraft shelters built here and throughout Iraq by the Yugoslavs were nicknamed 'Yugos'. At the time they were considered state of the art but were rendered obsolete in 1991 after the development of the GBU-28 laser-guided bunker-buster bomb.

Prior to the 2003 US-led invasion of Iraq, the base housed three units of the Iraqi Air Force, which flew MiG-25s and MiG-21s. It was abandoned shortly after the start of the invasion.

It was initially known as Objective Webster, and then eventually was renamed Al Asad Airbase, which means "The Lion" in Arabic.

=== Iraq War 2003–2011 ===
The base was initially secured during the Iraq War by the Australian Special Air Service Regiment on 16 April 2003, and was turned over to the 3rd Armored Cavalry Regiment (3rd ACR) in May 2003. The 3rd ACR was relieved by the Marines of the 1st Marine Expeditionary Force in March 2004. Al Asad became the largest U.S. base in western Iraq and the western equivalent of Baghdad's Green Zone.

Al-Asad was a major convoy hub, hosting hundreds of fuel and supply trucks every day. Huge shipments of fuel, aircraft ammunition, construction materials, drinkable water and food were commonly run along the dangerous routes coming out of Jordan, and Kuwait and, despite insurgent attempts, a majority of these convoys arrived at their destinations untouched. A single convoy operation would sometimes last a couple of days with trucks on the road for over 8 hours a day. The 482nd TC ran one operation that was 48 hours straight out of Al-Asad carrying supplies into the hot spots (Most of the fighting) of Iraq such as Fallujah l during the second siege in late 2004.

Like other large bases in Iraq, Al-Asad offered amenities including an indoor swimming pool, movie theater (which was a carbon copy of the Sustainer Theatre at Camp Anaconda), post office, Morale, Welfare and Recreation center, several gyms, Post Exchange, towards the end of 2005 a Burger King, Cinnabon, Kentucky Fried Chicken, Pizza Hut, Subway Restaurant, Combat Support Hospital, and a Green Beans Coffee Shop. The base is self-sufficient for producing drinking water, having both a reverse osmosis water purification plant and a bottling plant. Most of the housing on base are "cans" – shipping containers converted to, or manufactured as, living areas. Some of the original barracks still remain, however, and were used as well. Overflow tents were used when required, such as transition periods, which can nearly double the number of troops on the base. The base was a common destination for celebrities and politicians visiting American troops in Iraq, such as Chuck Norris and Toby Keith. While the towns and routes near Al Asad were as dangerous as anywhere else in Iraq, it is relatively remote and is easily accessible by air. The base often received indirect fire from Iraqi insurgents which usually caused little to no damage, though there were occasional casualties.

The controversial song "Hadji Girl" was recorded at Al Asad in 2005.

On 3 September 2007, President George W. Bush, Secretary of State Condoleezza Rice, Secretary of Defense Robert Gates, and Chairman of the Joint Chiefs of Staff General Peter Pace visited Al-Asad and spent Labor Day with the servicemembers deployed to the base.

As the Marines withdrew from Iraq, Al-Asad remained one of the last American-occupied bases in Al Anbar. In 2009 and 2010, Marines with the 2nd MEF removed the majority of gear and personnel from the base. The MEF concluded its operations at Al Asad in March 2010. The last of the civilian personnel were airlifted from Al-Asad on 16 December 2011, and the base officially closed on 31 December 2011.

==== Units involved ====
- 561st Corps Support Group (US Army Reserve) Between November 2004 and September 2005
- 482nd Transportation Company (US Army Reserve) Between November 2004 and September 2005
- 10th Mountain Division - Providing Gun Truck Support
- 855th QM Co. Between November 2008 and October 2009
- VMFA(AW)-242 (F/A-18D) between August 2004 and January 2005
- VMFA(AW)-224 (F/A-18D) between January and August 2005
- VMFA-142 (F/A-18A+) between February 2005 and September 2005
- VMFA(AW)-332 (F/A-18D) between August 2005 and February 2006
- VMFA(AW)-533 (F/A-18D) between February and August 2006
- VMFA(AW)-242 (F/A-18D) between August 2006 and February 2007
- VMFA(AW)-121 (F/A-18D) between February and August 2007
- VMFA(AW)-225 (F/A-18D) between August 2007 and March 2008
- VMFA-122 (F/A-18C) between August 2008 and March 2009
- VMFA-314 (F/A-18A) between March 2009 and September 2009
- VMA-214 (AV-8B) between May 2004 and August 2004
- VMA-542 (AV-8B) between May 2004 and November 2004
- VMA-214 (AV-8B) between July 2004 and February 2005
- VMA-311 (AV-8B) between November 2004 and May 2005
- VMA-223 (AV-8B) between August 2005 and March 2006
- VMA-513 (AV-8B) between March 2006 and September 2006
- VMA-211 (AV-8B) between September 2006 and March 2007
- HMH-361 (CH-53E) between July 2004 and April 2005
- HMH-361 (CH-53E) between October 2007 and May 2008
- VMM-263 (MV-22B) between October 2007 and April 2008 (Operation Iraqi Freedom 682)
- HMH-466 (CH-53E) between October 2008 and May 2009
- HMM-774 (CH-46E) between August 2004 and March 2006
- HMLA-269 (UH-1N/AH-1W) between February 2006 and October 2006 (Operation Iraqi Freedom)
- HMLA-269 (UH-1N/AH-1W) between February 2007 and October 2007 (Operation Iraqi Freedom)
- 224th Aviation Regiment (UH-60A/L) between February 2006 and February 2007 attached to Marine Aircraft Group 16
- 327th Signal Battalion (United States) (Company A) between February 2005 and July 2005
- VMGR-252 (KC-130J) between February 2005 and February 2006
- Battery F (HIMARS), 2nd Battalion, 14th Marines between July 2007 and January 2008
- 3rd Battalion 10th Marines between March 2008 and October 2008
- 3rd Battalion 24th Marines between September 2009 and April 2010
- VAQ 142 between May 2010 and November 2010
- 362d Expeditionary Reconnaissance Squadron between September 2011 and November 2011
- MWSS-472 (rein) from September 2004 to February 2005 and from August 2009 to January 2010
- 82nd Airborne Division 2nd BCT 407th BSB from May 2011 to December 2011

=== Intervention against ISIL ===
When Marines with Special Purpose Marine Air-Ground Task Force - Crisis Response - Central Command returned in September 2014, Commanding Officer Colonel Jason Bohm said it was "like a scene out of the Twilight Zone. Our headquarters was a former Marine air logistics squadron headquarters. There were items that were just left there when we picked up and left. Literally newspapers with the date the last person that was in that office (departed are) still there, except there’s a lot of dust on it now."

In late October 2014, the airbase and surrounding region came under repeated attack by Islamic State (ISIL) militants. Fifty U.S. advisers were sent to the base. Also to conduct a site survey for U.S. advisers can use the installation to support the Iraqi military, said Navy Cmdr. Elissa Smith, a Defense Department spokeswoman. It now hosts 320 advisers.

During the early morning hours of 14 December 2014, U.S. Marines hosted there allegedly clashed with ISIL alongside the Iraqi Army and Tribal Forces near Ayn al Asad base, west of Anbar, in an attempt to repel them from the base of which includes about 100 U.S. advisers in it at the time, when ISIL attempted to overrun the base. According to a field commander of the Iraqi Army in Anbar province, "the U.S. force equipped with light and medium weapons, supported by F-18, was able to inflict casualties against fighters of ISIL organization, and forced them to retreat from the al-Dolab area, which lies 10 kilometers from Ain al-Assad base." Sheikh Mahmud Nimrawi, a prominent tribal leader in the region, added that "U.S. forces intervened because of ISIL started to come near the base, which they are stationed in so out of self-defense," he responded, welcoming the U.S. intervention, and saying "which I hope will not be the last." This was said to be the first encounter between the United States and the Islamic State, in four years. However, this claim has been stated to be "false" by the Pentagon. The airbase and surrounding region came under repeated attack by Islamic State militants in October 2014.

On 5 January 2015, the Pentagon acknowledged that ISIL has been ineffectively mortaring the base.

Between 6–7 February 2015, U.S. Marines and Danish soldiers with Task Force Al-Asad taught Iraqi soldiers basic defense and ambush techniques.

In February 2015, ISIL took control of most of the town of al-Baghdadi which is close to Al-Asad Airbase and began what a Defense Department spokeswoman called "ineffective indirect fire" against Al Asad base. Later, according to CBS News, "Eight suicide bombers managed [on February 13] to get onto [Al Asad] ... but were killed by an ISF counter attack almost immediately." Further, CBS news reported that "ISIL [had] been regularly shelling Ain al-Assad for the past couple days, but there have been no reports of damage from the shelling or the attempted bombing on Friday." In early March, Iraqi forces cleared ISIL out of al-Baghdadi.

The airbase continues to be used by coalition forces in Iraq, including British troops. In 2016 it was announced that the UK would send 250 more troops to be stationed at Al-Asad base. In February 2018, it was announced that Capt Dean Sprouting had been killed at the base, possibly as a result of an accident. The Captain had been serving with the Black Watch, 3rd Battalion, Royal Regiment of Scotland.

=== Post-ISIL defeat ===
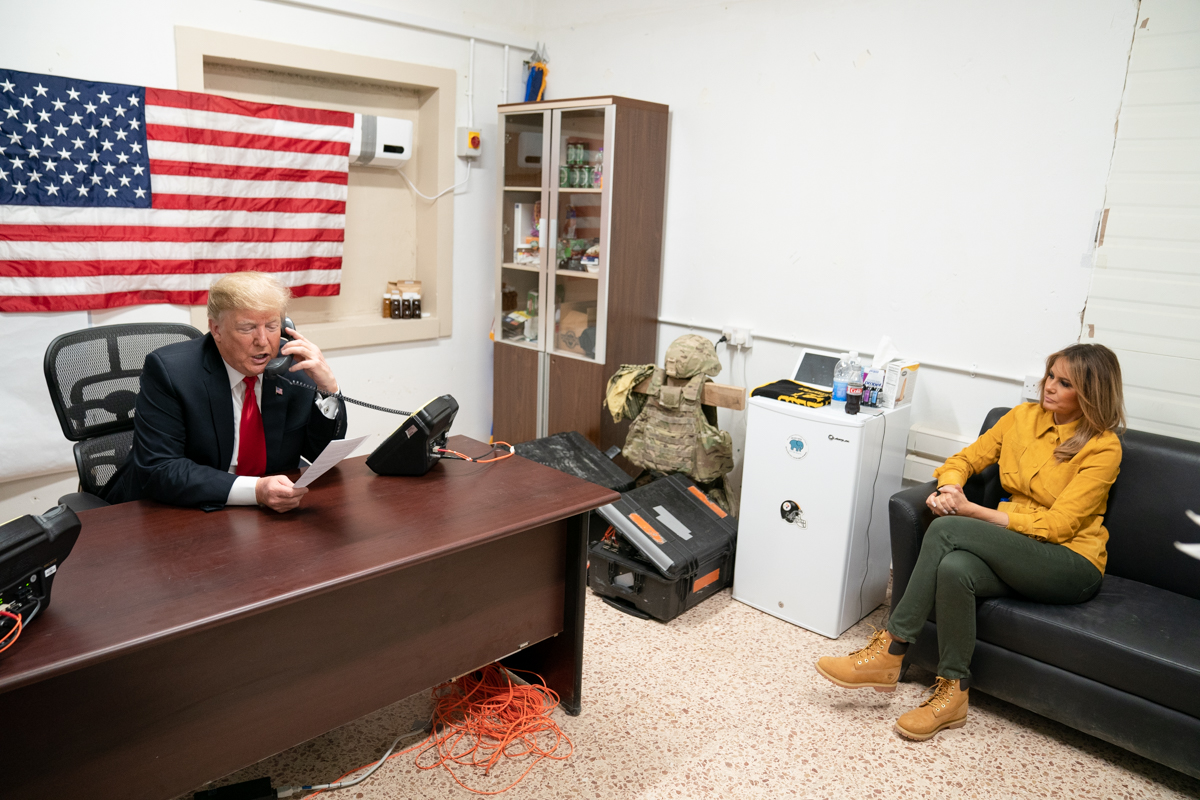
President Trump, joined by First Lady Melania Trump, speaks on the phone with Iraqi Prime Minister Abdul-Mahdi, 26 December 2018, during his visit to Al Asad Airbase.

On 26 December 2018, President Donald Trump and First Lady Melania Trump visited Al-Asad Airbase. In a speech given there, Trump claimed that the military hadn't gotten a raise in ten years, and that he would be giving them a raise of over 10 percent. However, American military personnel had received a pay hike of at least one percent for the past 30 years, got a 2.4 percent pay increase in 2018, and would receive a 2.6 percent pay increase for 2019. During the visit, Trump took photos with Seal Team 5 special operators and posted images of their faces without obscuring them. The Office of the Secretary of Defense said that no rules were broken, because the special operators volunteered to participate in the press event.

=== 2020 Iranian missile attack ===
According to a 3 January 2020 Reuters article, a "security source" inside Al-Asad Airbase and a "local official at a nearby town" said that the reports that the Al-Asad Airbase were under attack, are false. On 8 January 2020, Iranian media, shortly followed by American media, reported that missiles had been launched by the Islamic Revolutionary Guard Corps (IRGC) at the airbase. State TV reported that the operation's name was "Martyr Soleimani" and was in response to the killing head of the IRGC's Quds Force Qasem Soleimani. The IRGC said more than 30 missiles were fired. The Pentagon confirmed that "more than a dozen ballistic missiles were launched from Iran." A defense official said, "10 of the missiles hit Al Asad Airbase, one struck Irbil in northern Iraq and four "failed in flight."

In late March 2020, U.S. military deployed Patriot air defence systems in Al Asad Airbase as a precaution against possible further Iranian missile attacks.

=== Attacks during the Gaza War ===
On 17 October 2023, amid the Gaza war, Iraqi militants launched a drone strike on the airbase. The airstrike was intercepted. The next day, a false alarm in the airbase caused the death of a civilian contractor from cardiac arrest. On 20 October, the US ordered all non-emergency staff to leave their embassy in Baghdad and consulate in Erbil.

On 20 November, eight US and coalition soldiers were injured from a ballistic missile attack, and there was minor infrastructural damage after the air base was attacked by a ballistic missile.

On 20 January 2024, the Islamic Resistance in Iraq claimed responsibility for striking the base with dozens of missiles which injured several US military personnel and an Iraqi service member. At 6:30 p.m. Baghdad time, the IRI launched multiple ballistic missiles and other rockets at the Al-Asad Airbase. The United States military attempted to defend the base with Patriot missiles. More than 15 MIM-104 Patriot missiles were launched to defend the base.

On 5 August 2024, a missile attack targeted the airbase, resulting in injuries to at least five US servicemembers and two contractors. The attack involved the firing of two Katyusha rockets, which landed inside the base. One of the injured servicemembers sustained serious injuries. The incident is seen as a potential escalation in the ongoing tensions between Iran and the United States.

On 23 June 2025, Iran launched missiles, targeting al-Asad airbase that housed U.S. troops, in retaliation for the 2025 United States strikes on Iranian nuclear sites.

=== US withdrawal ===
In accordance with an agreement signed in 2024 between the governments of Iraq and the United States, following the territorial defeat of ISIS and the end of Operation Inherent Resolve in Iraq, US forces were scheduled to withdraw completely from Al-Asad base by September 2025, but due to the Fall of the Assad regime in Syria and new developments regarding increasing ISIS activity subsequent to the regime change in Syria and – according to prime minister Mohammed Shia al-Sudani – in order to not allow ISIS to "exploit the security vacuum", a force of 250–350 US troops remained in the base in October 2025. On 17 January 2026, the remaining troops withdrew and the Iraqi armed forces assumed full control of the base.

== See also ==
- Al-Qa'im
- Al-Taqaddum Air Base
- Camp Speicher
