= Camp Arifjan =

United States military base in Kuwait

Camp Arifjan Patton Army Heliport
- Kuwait
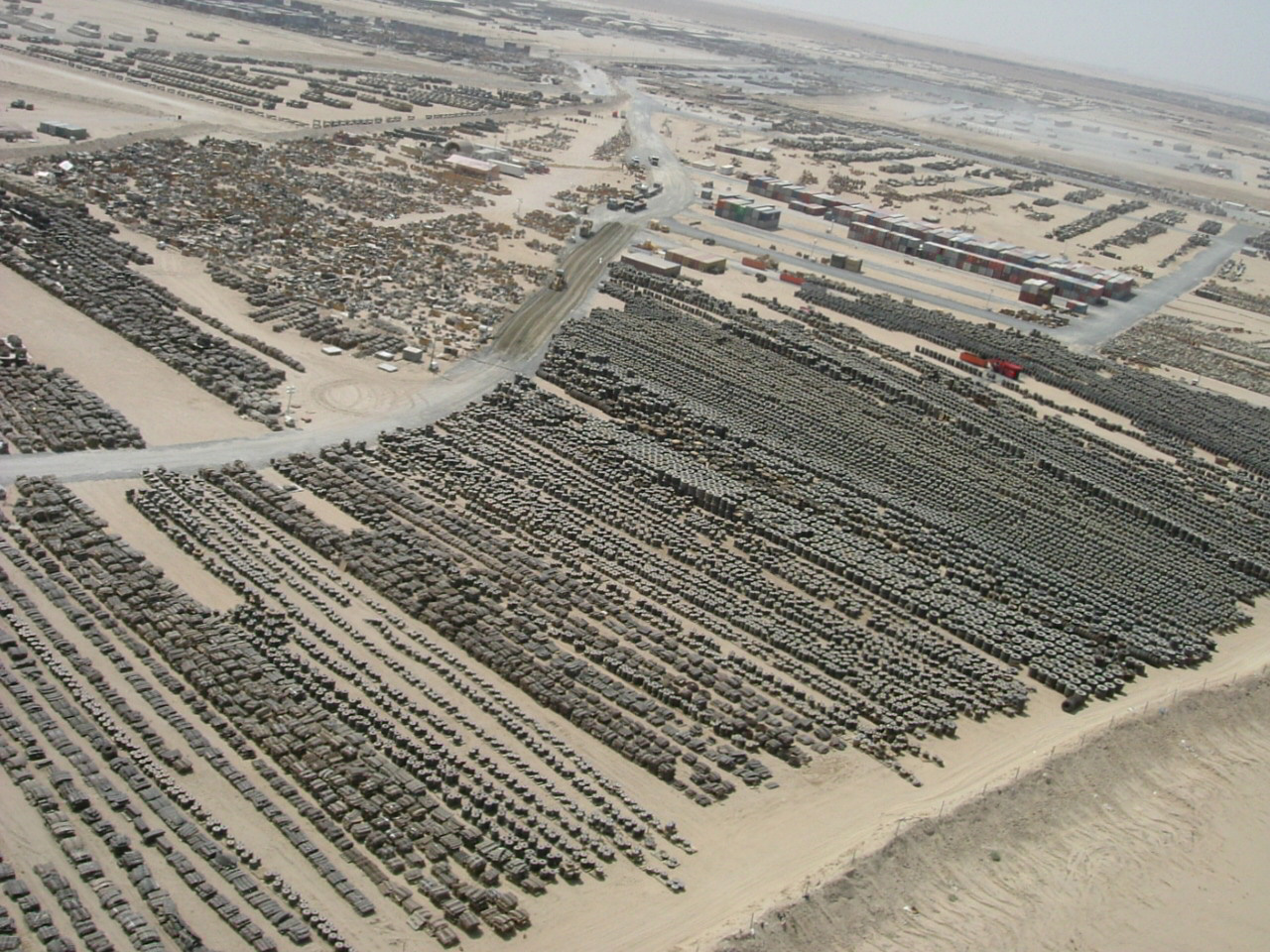
- Thousands of tires and other military equipment line a staging area at Camp Arifjan, 2004

Site information
- Operator: United States Army
- Controlled by: United States Army Central

Location
- Location within Kuwait
- Coordinates: 28.878°N 48.1579°E

Airfield information
- Identifiers: LID: OK2A (Note: LID assigned by the NGA, not ICAO code)
Helipads
Number	Length and surface
	75 by 75 feet (23 m × 23 m) Concrete
	200 by 200 feet (61 m × 61 m) Asphalt
- Sources: DoD FLIP

Camp Arifjan is a United States Army installation in Kuwait which accommodates elements of the US Air Force, US Navy, US Marine Corps and US Coast Guard. The camp is funded and was built by the government of Kuwait. Military personnel from the United Kingdom, Australia, Canada, Romania and Poland are also forward-deployed there. Camp Arifjan is located south of Kuwait City, and west of the Shuaiba Port (Military Sea Port of Debarkation/Embarkation, or SPOD) and Kuwait Naval Base (KNB). Camp Arifjan is divided into 7 zones.

Camp Arifjan is a US military installation used as a forward logistics base, Aviation Classification and Repair Activity Depot (Task Force AVCRAD) for the entire Southwest Asian Theater (through Patton Army Air Field), helicopter ground support base, and as a motor pool for armored and unarmored vehicles. U.S. military vehicles that did not receive new additional armor plating in the United States prior to deployment to U.S. Central Command–tens of thousands–received their "up-armoring" at Camp Arifjan.

Additionally, many thousands of service members and contractors pass through Camp Arifjan either on their way to or from countries in Southwest Asia. The service members deployed to Camp Arifjan are in a variety of different statuses. Many are on active duty and come on a one-year Permanent Change of Station (PCS), while some active duty come in a Temporary Change of Station (TCS) status. Additionally, there are many Guard and Reserve units that support a variety of functions in the SouthWest Asia [SWA] theater that come on varied length tours.

== Units ==
- 3rd Infantry Division Sustainment Brigade (Task Force Provider) (June 2021 – March 2022)
- 36th Sustainment Brigade, Texas Army National Guard (Task Force Phoenix) (March–November 2022)
- 369th Sustainment Brigade, New York Army National Guard (Task Force Hellfighter) (November 2022 – present)
- 1st Theater Sustainment Command
- Navy Expeditionary Logistics Support Forward Groups (NAVELSG) Hotel-Papa
- Navy Customs Battalions Oscar-Tango

== History ==
Because of the Khobar Towers bombing of 1996 in nearby Saudi Arabia, the U.S. Army decided to replace Camp Doha near Basrah with a base more protected from terrorist attacks. In July 1999, the Kuwaiti government began constructing Camp Arifjan south of its capital. The camp and surrounding Arifjan desert area are named after the desert shrub Rhanterium epapposum, known locally as arfaj.

== Patton Army Heliport ==
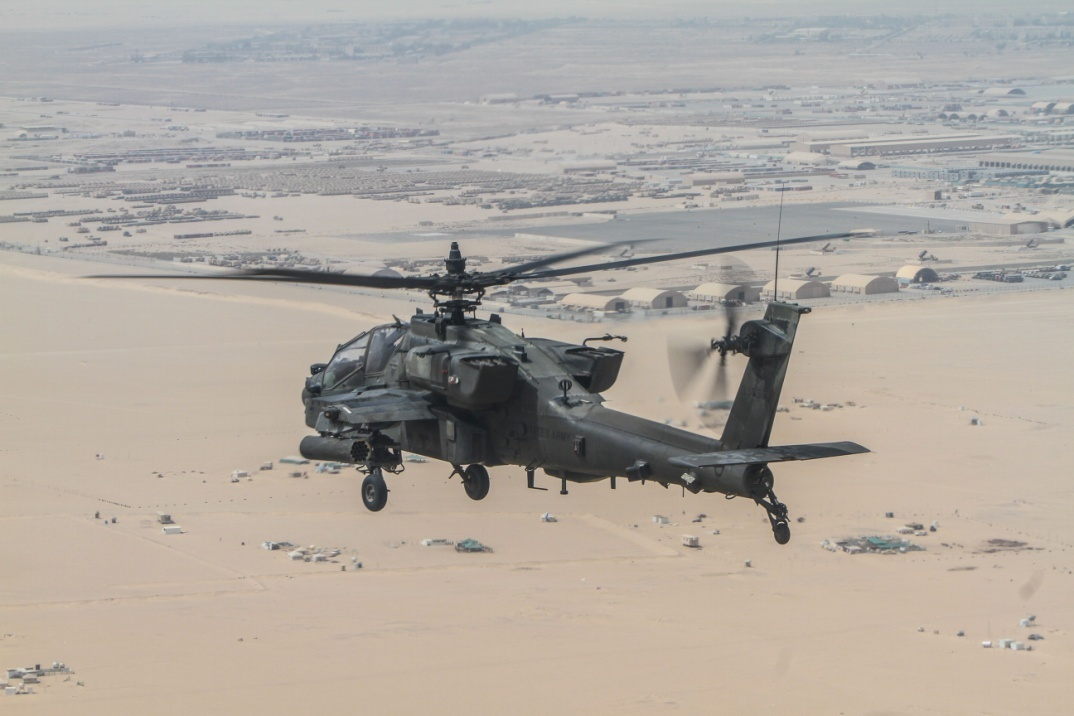
A US Army AH-64 Apache prepares to land at Patton AHP in 2015

Patton Army Heliport (LID: OK2A) is the United States Army airfield located within the camp boundaries. Patton Army Airfield is run by elements of the Army National Guard's Aviation Classification and Repair Activity Depots (AVCRADs). Organizational (AVUM), Intermediate (AVIM) and limited depot maintenance support is available via Patton Army Airfield and its corresponding AVCRAD elements to many United States military aviation assets within the Southwest Asian Theater (SWA). The airfield is named in memory of General George S. Patton.

== Facilities ==
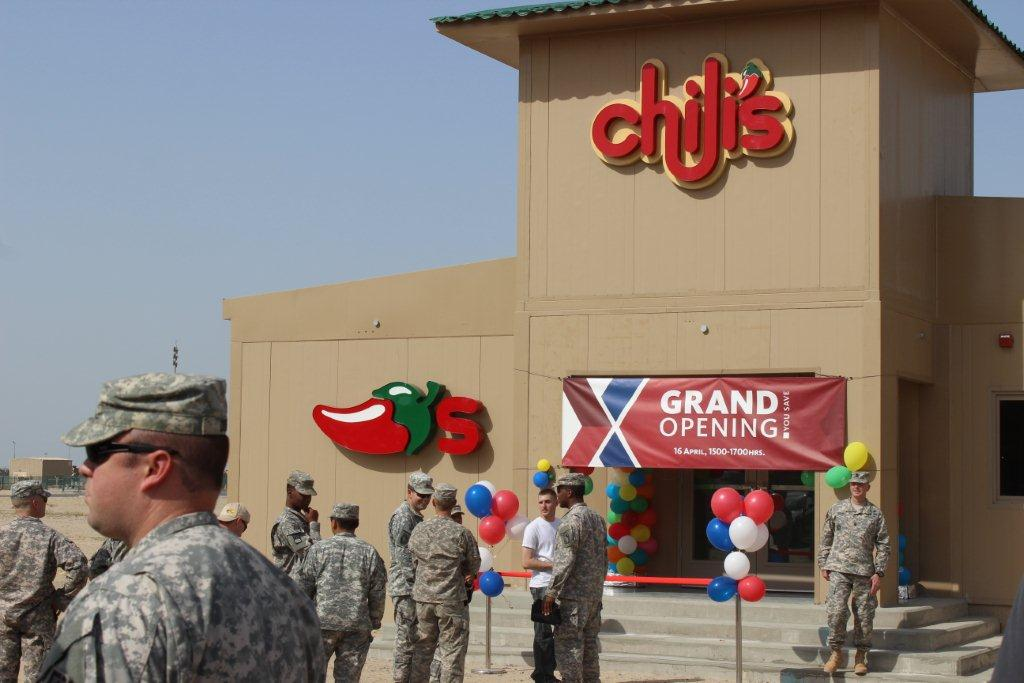
Opening of Chili's on Camp Arifjan, Kuwait, by Al Ghunaim Trading Co. and Gulf Civilization.

The base has undergone many changes within the past several years, including the construction of half a dozen barracks, hundreds of "temporary" or transitional barracks, known as PCBs (Pre-Fabricated Concrete Buildings), three dining facilities, and the establishment of three base exchanges (AAFES), as well as a major addition of paved roads throughout the Camp. There are approximately 9,000 personnel stationed at Camp Arifjan. In addition, a number of foreign nationals also work at the base. The facility is primarily staffed by US Army Contractors.

The base leadership continues to allow local and Third Country National vendors to set up small shops within the main PX lobby. In addition to the permanent vendors, certain vendors are also allowed to set up large Arab-style bazaars on Wednesdays and Sundays.

Camp Arifjan has many fast food restaurants on site, such as: Pizza Hut, Charley's Subs, Hardees’s Burgers, three Subways, Burger King, Pizza Inn, Taco Bell, KFC, Baskin Robbins, Panda Oriental, Green Beans Coffee, two Starbucks, Coffee Bean & Tea Leaf, and Cinnamonster. There is also a large Chili's restaurant with 250-person seating capacity, as well as three Military Dining Facilities (DFACs), some of which serve four meals daily.

The camp is colloquially known by the initials "AJ", or as Camp Afri-jail.
