= Unioninvest =

Unioninvest d.d. Sarajevo
- Predecessor: Unioninvest
- Headquarters: Sarajevo, Bosnia and Herzegovina
- Website: unioninvest.net

Unioninvest d.d. Sarajevo is a Bosnian construction and engineering company based in Sarajevo.

It is a legal successor of Unioninvest, one of the ten most important companies in Bosnia and Herzegovina until 1992 and a respectable name in the business world.

Unioninvest was among the first companies which started with water treatment, treatment of sun energy, provision of gas. It acted on foreign markets and acquired works for which it was said that only big and respectable companies could do.

The major expansion happened in the 1980s. Unioninvest had 11,000 employees and realized the annual turnover of US 400 million dollars. It worked on the entire territory of former Yugoslavia, but also in Germany, Russia, Algeria, Libya, Kuwait, and as far east as Iraq and Iran.
