= United States Navy Customs =

U.S. Navy Customs Battalion
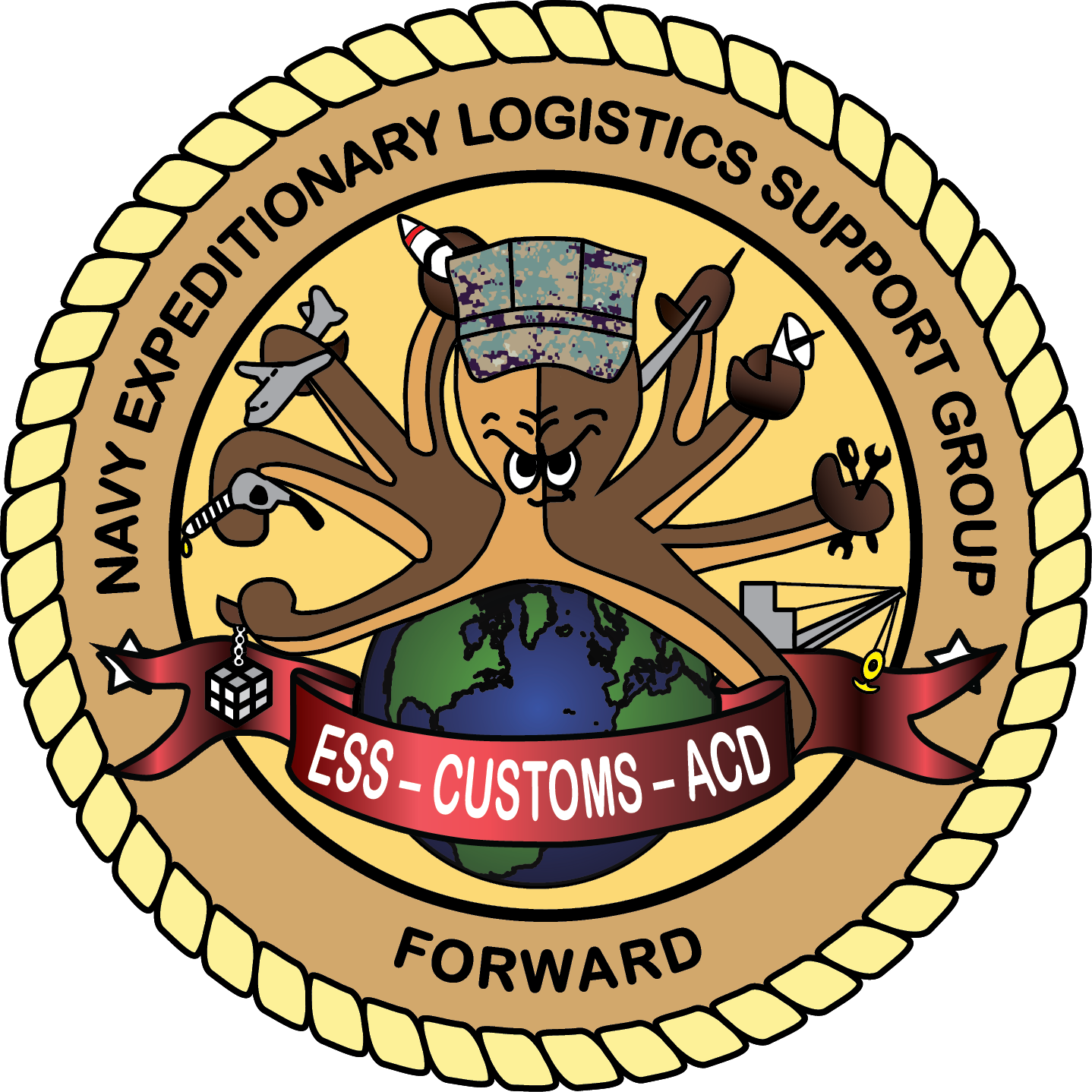
- Navy Expeditionary Logistics Support Group (FORWARD) logo
- Country: United States of America
- Branch: United States Navy
- Type: Customs Battalion
- Role: Customs and Inspection
- Size: battalion
- Mascot: Octopus
- Engagements: Operation Iraqi Freedom; Operation Enduring Freedom

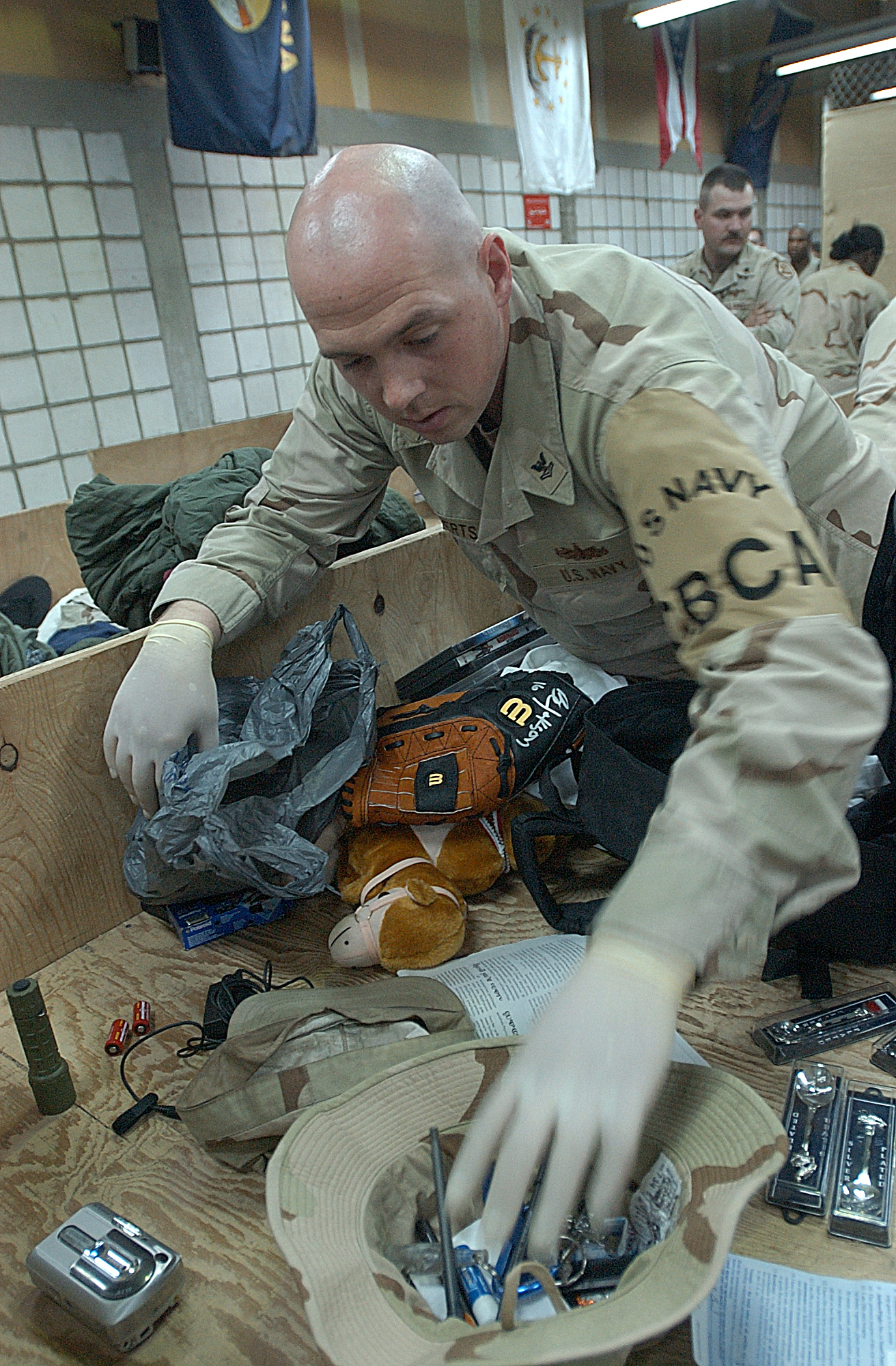
A Navy Customs Fire Controlman 2nd Class performs a customs inspection on a U.S. Army Soldier's duffle bag at Camp Doha, Kuwait

The United States Navy Customs mission is one that is assigned to the Commander, Navy Expeditionary Logistics Support Group (NAVELSG). The mission is overseen in the Central Command Theater of Operations by Navy Expeditionary Logistics Support Group Forward Headquarters, as well as the Commander, USCENTCOM.

The Navy Customs mission is detailed by Navy Reserves and augmented by the active-duty Navy; they are mobilized for a period of 320 days. Upon receipt of orders for mobilization, the reserve members report to a Navy Mobilization Processing Site for processing and screening to ensure they are fit for duty and have no issues that will preclude them from carrying out their primary mission. This process usually takes approximately two weeks from when they report in until they are sent to NAVELSG for training.

Upon arrival at NAVELSG, the sailors undergo a month of training in everything they need to know to operate in the USCENTCOM theater of operations in support of Operation Iraqi Freedom/Operation Enduring Freedom. They are trained in the use of weapons, driving tactical vehicles, first aid, small unit tactics, hand-to-hand combat and the procedures and standards required of items and personnel re-entering the United States from overseas. Upon completion of training, they are certified as Customs Border Clearance Agents, with the authority to carry out customs inspection on equipment and personnel within USCENTCOM only.

Upon arrival in the theater of operations, all personnel check in with the US Army Personnel Support Battalion located at the Army Life Support Area (ALSA), Ali Al Salem, Kuwait. From there, each company then heads to its base of operations, either at Camp Arifjan, Kuwait, the Kuwait Naval Base, Camp Patriot, Ali Al Salem, or Camp Beuhring, Camp Virginia; or they stay at ALSA for further training before deploying to Balad, Iraq or Afghanistan. Fly away missions to Jebel Ali, Jordon and the UAE are frequent.

The divisions within the battalions are now split into four sections, Alpha, Bravo, Charlie and Afghan. Divisions are led by the top Petty Officers within each camp and are held to the highest standards.

There have been a total of fifteen (15) Customs Battalions deployed for this mission. In order, they are:

Navy Customs Battalion Oscar
Navy Customs Battalion Papa
Navy Customs Battalion Quebec
Navy Customs Battalion Romeo
Navy Customs Battalion Sierra
Navy Customs Battalion Tango
NAVELSG FWD HOTEL
NAVELSG FWD INDIA
NAVELSG FWD JULIET
NAVELSG FWD KILO
NAVELSG FWD LIMA
NAVELSG FWD MIKE
NAVELSG FWD NOVEMBER
NAVELSG FWD OSCAR
NAVELSG FWD PAPA

After the departure of PAPA rotation on 11 October 2013, the customs mission was handed over to the USAF's 387th Air Expeditionary Squadron. After the departure of USAF rotation on 1 April 2014, the customs mission was handed over to the United States Marine Corps USMC 2D Law Enforcement Battalion.
