= 84th Combat Sustainment Wing =

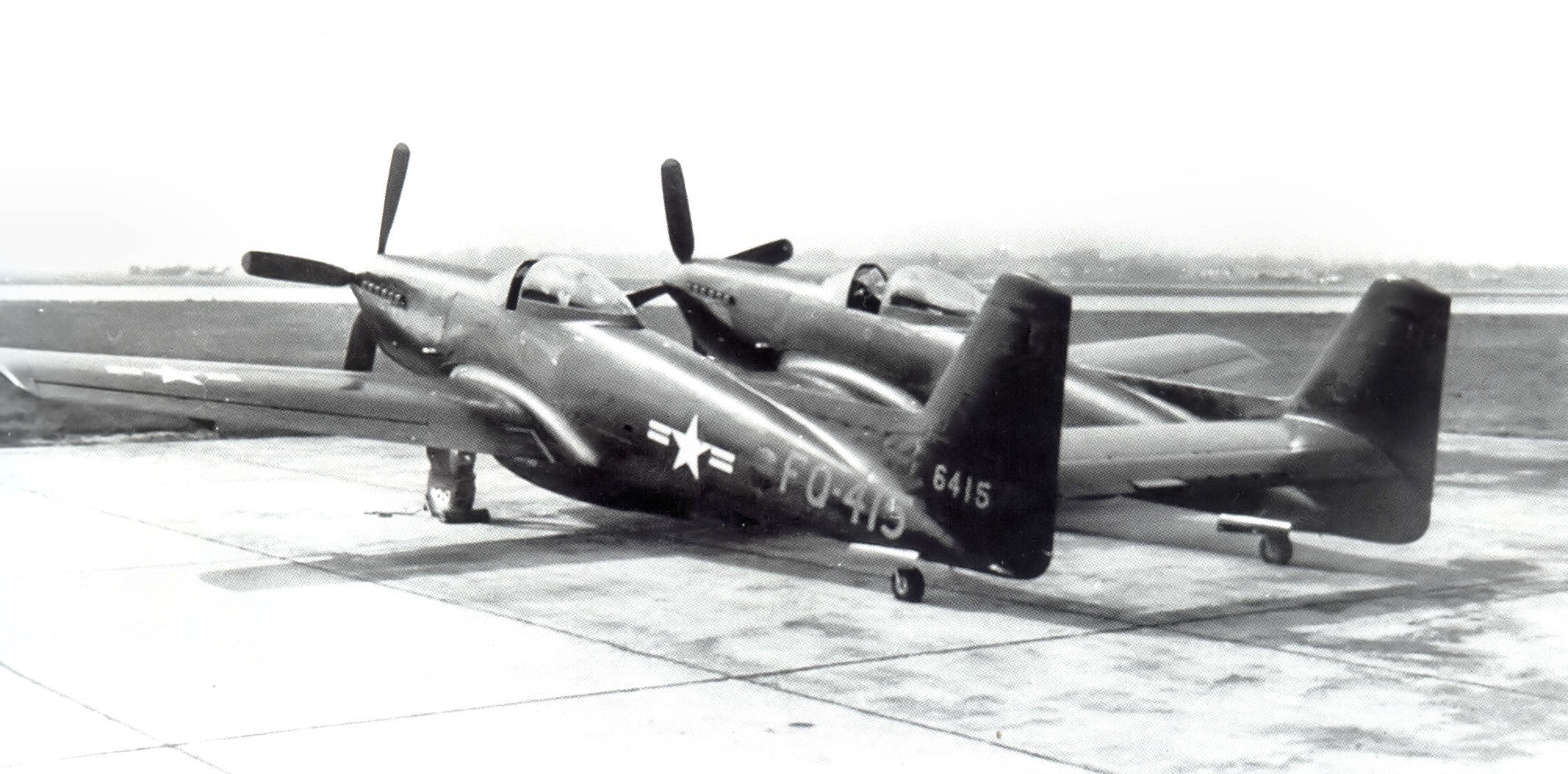
- 52d Fighter Wing F-82F Twin Mustang (Note: Aircraft is North American P-82F (later F-82F) Twin Mustang, serial 46-415.)
- Active: 1949–1951, 2005–2014
- Country: United States
- Branch: United States Air Force
- Role: Equipment support

Insignia
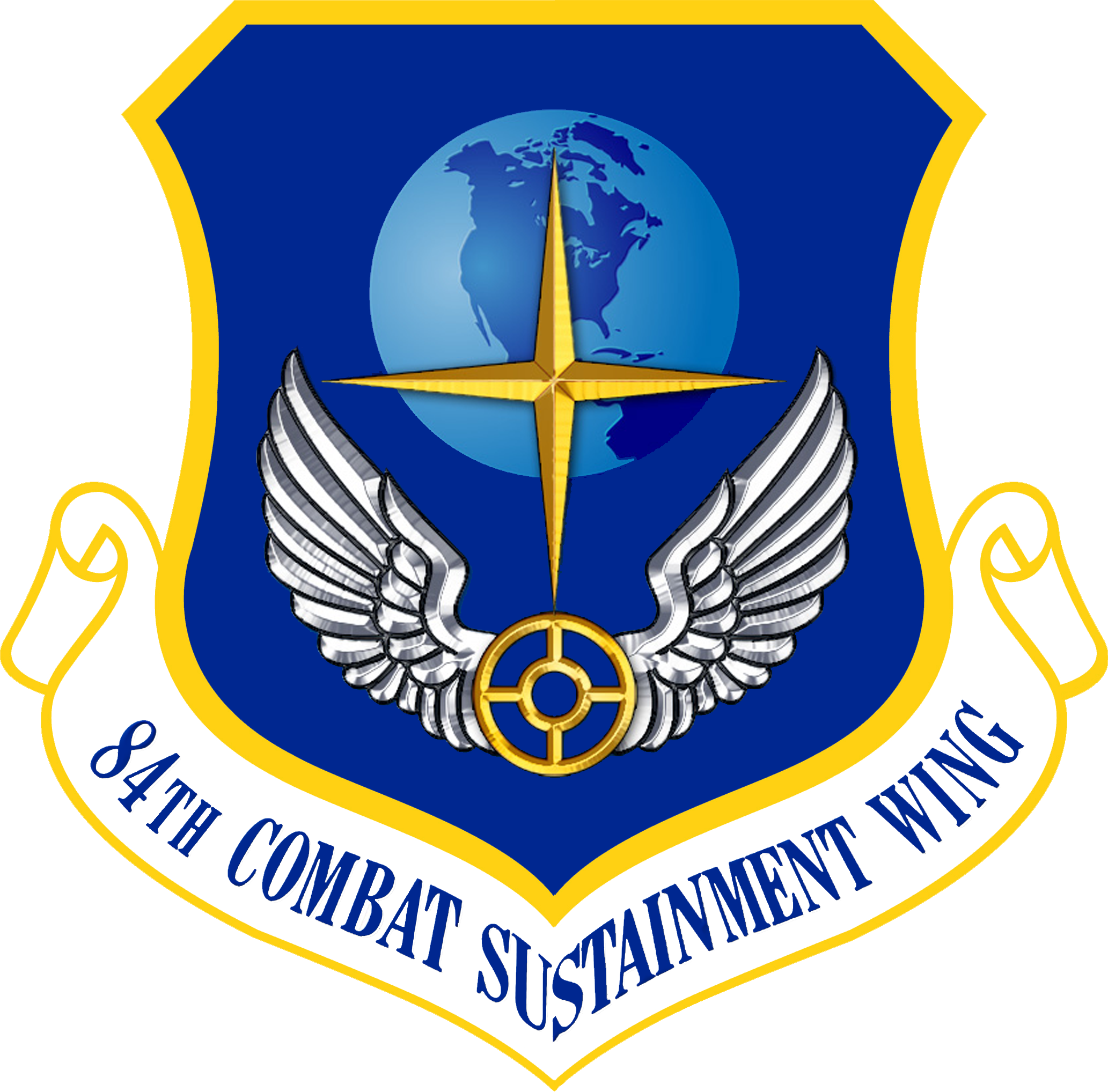
- 84th Combat Sustainment Wing emblem (Note: Description: Azure a globe Celeste, land masses of the first [color], surmounted by a four-pointed star Or in fess point; in base, a winged [bombsight] of the third [color], voided of the field['s color], wings Argent, all within a diminished bordure of the third [color].)

The 84th Combat Sustainment Wing was a wing of the United States Air Force based at Hill Air Force Base, Utah from 2005 to 2014. It was first organized in 1949 in the military reserve force as the 84th Fighter Wing flying the North American F-82 Twin Mustangs of the active duty 52nd Fighter Group. In 1951, the wing was called to active duty for the Korean War. Is personnel were used to augment the 52nd Wing and it was inactivated shortly after its activation.

It was reactivated in 2005 in a reorganization of Air Force Materiel Command (AFMC) that replaced offices in its logistics centers with wings, groups and squadrons but was inactivated when AFMC returned to its previous organization.

== History ==
=== Air Force reserve ===
The May 1949 Air Force reserve program called for a new type of unit, the corollary unit, which was a reserve unit integrated with an active-duty unit. The plan was viewed as the best method to train reservists by mixing them with an existing regular unit to perform duties alongside the regular unit, using the regular unit’s aircraft. Its objective was to permit reservists to be employed immediately upon mobilization, either as individuals or as a unit. However, corollary unit training had to be balanced against the regular unit’s mission, and deployment and exercise participation interrupted training activities.

In this program, the 84th Fighter Wing was established as a corollary unit of the 52d Fighter Wing at Mitchel Air Force Base, New York but was not manned until it moved to McGuire Air Force Base, New Jersey later that year. Even after its move, the wing remained undermanned and performed little training. It had no aircraft assigned, but flew North American F-82 Twin Mustang aircraft of the 52d Wing. However, during its sole active duty encampment it had only four pilots qualified to fly this aircraft. It was called to active duty in 1951 for twenty-one months, but the day after it was activated its personnel were transferred to the 52d Wing, and it was inactivated.

=== Air Force Materiel Command ===
Prior to 2005, Program Executive Officers (PEO)s managing Air Force systems were generally located in Washington. Program managers in field units reported to the PEO for each program. As a result of a study begun in 2003 the Air Force decided to consolidate PEOs and locate them at the Air Force Materiel Command (AFMC) centers. The reorganization was known as the Air Force Materiel Command Transformation. In conjunction with the new organization, the traditional center directorates were replaced by wings and groups.

In this reorganization, the wing was reactivated in 2005 as the 84th Combat Sustainment Wing. The wing was originally assigned four functional groups, but all but one of the groups was inactivated by 2008. (Note: The wing was also authorized, on a temporary basis, the honors and history of its subordinate 84th Combat Sustainment Group, earned as a fighter group during World War II and as a component of Air Defense Command during the Cold War. Cornett & Johnson, p. 74, Maurer, pp. 150–51) The wing's mission was to provide system support manager functions for air-to-surface munitions, and multiple command, control, communication and intelligence (C3I) systems, and supply chain management for space systems, C3I systems, landing gear, power systems and multiple aircraft programs.

After analyzing the results of the Air Force Materiel Command Transformation reorganization, the Air Force announced the Air Force Acquisition Improvement Plan in May 2009 and four months later announced the initiative would include a gradual return to the Directorate organizational model. In May 2014, the wing was inactivated along with the 508th Aerospace Sustainment Wing and replaced by the Aerospace Sustainment Directorate of Ogden Air Logistics Center.

== Lineage ==
- Constituted as the 84th Fighter Wing, All Weather on 16 May 1949

Activated in the reserve on 1 June 1949
Redesignated 84th Fighter All-Weather Wing on 1 March 1950
Ordered into active service on 1 June 1951
Inactivated on 2 June 1951.
Redesignated 84th Combat Sustainment Wing on 15 January 2005
Activated 24 February 2005
Inactivated in May 2014

=== Assignments ===
- First Air Force, 1 June 1949 (attached to 52d Fighter Wing)
- Eastern Air Defense Force, 1 September 1950 – 2 June 1951 (remained attached to 52d Fighter-Interceptor Wing)
- Ogden Air Logistics Center, 24 February 2005 – c. May 2014

=== Components ===
- 84th Air Base Group: 1 June 1949 – 2 June 1951
- 84th Commodities Sustainment Group: 24 February 2005 – 28 April 2006
- 84th Fighter Group, All Weather (later 84th Fighter All-Weather Group, 84th Space and Command, Control, Communications and Intelligence Sustainment Group, 84th Combat Sustainment Group): 1 June 1949 – 2 June 1951, 24 February 2005 – c. May 2014
- 84th Maintenance & Supply Group: 1 June 1949 – 2 June 1951
- 84th Materiel Sustainment Group: 24 February 2005 – 28 April 2006
- 84th Medical Group: 1 June 1949 – 2 June 1951
- 84th Specialized Management Sustainment Group: 24 February 2005 – 28 April 2006
- 784th Combat Sustainment Group: 28 April 2006 – 30 June 2010
- 884th Combat Sustainment Group: 28 April 2006 – 28 April 2008
- 984th Combat Sustainment Group: 28 April 2006 – 28 April 2008

=== Stations ===
- Mitchel Air Force Base, New York, 1 June 1949
- McGuire Air Force Base, New Jersey, 10 October 1949 – 2 June 1951
- Hill Air Force Base, Utah, 24 February 2005 – c. May 2014
